= 2005 Spa DTM round =

3rd round of the 2005 Deutsche Tourenwagen Masters

(Belgium) 2005 DTM Spa-Francorchamps round
Round details
Round 3 of 11 rounds in the
2005 Deutsche Tourenwagen Masters season
← Previous race	Next race →
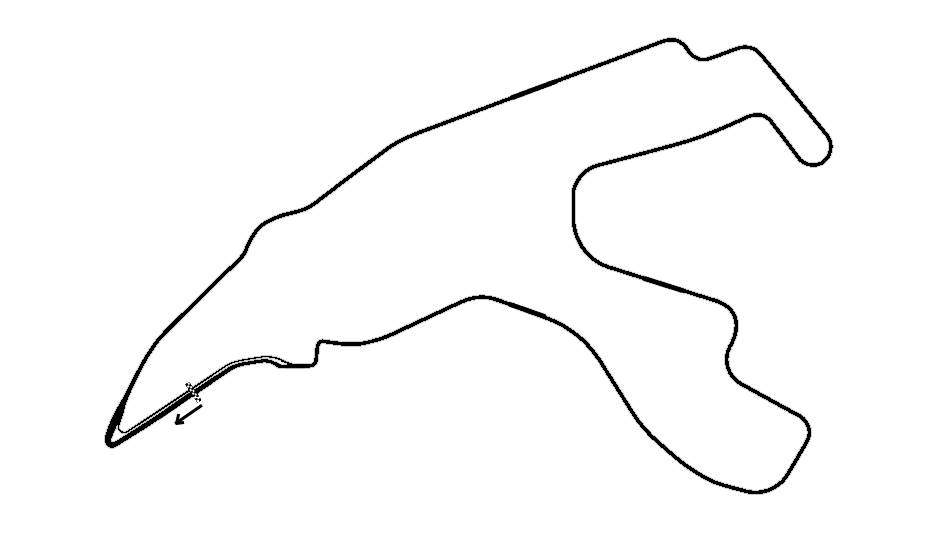
- Location: Circuit de Spa-Francorchamps, Stavelot, Belgium
- Course: Permanent racing facility 6.976 km (4.335 mi)

Deutsche Tourenwagen Masters

Race
- Date: 15 May 2005
- Laps: 24

Pole position
Driver	(Finland) Mika Häkkinen	Sport Edition AMG-Mercedes
- Time: 2:32.729

Podium
First	(Finland) Mika Häkkinen	Sport Edition AMG-Mercedes
Second	(Sweden) Mattias Ekström	Audi Sport Team Abt Sportsline
Third	(Denmark) Tom Kristensen	Audi Sport Team Abt

Fastest lap
Driver	(Finland) Mika Häkkinen	Sport Edition AMG-Mercedes
- Time: 2:13.134 (on lap 13)

The 2005 Spa DTM round was a motor racing event for the Deutsche Tourenwagen Masters held between 13–15 May 2005. The event, part of the 19th season of the DTM, was held at the Circuit de Spa-Francorchamps in Belgium.

== Results ==
=== Qualifying ===
Pos.	No.	Driver	Team	Car	Q	SP	Grid
1	8	(Finland) Mika Häkkinen	Sport Edition AMG-Mercedes	AMG-Mercedes C-Klasse 2005	2:33.904	2:32.729	1
2	1	(Sweden) Mattias Ekström	Audi Sport Team Abt Sportsline	Audi A4 DTM 2005	2:32.918	2:33.292	2
3	14	(Germany) Christian Abt	Audi Sport Team Joest Racing	Audi A4 DTM 2004	2:33.901	2:33.991	3
4	9	(Switzerland) Marcel Fässler	GMAC Team OPC	Opel Vectra GTS V8 2005	2:32.450	2:34.121	4
5	15	(Germany) Pierre Kaffer	Audi Sport Team Joest Racing	Audi A4 DTM 2004	2:33.569	2:34.304	5
6	5	(Denmark) Tom Kristensen	Audi Sport Team Abt	Audi A4 DTM 2005	2:32.630	2:34.870	6
7	11	(France) Laurent Aïello	Team OPC	Opel Vectra GTS V8 2005	2:31.928	2:35.844	7
8	4	(France) Jean Alesi	AMG-Mercedes	AMG-Mercedes C-Klasse 2005	2:33.913	2:36.884	8
9	21	(United Kingdom) Jamie Green	Salzgitter AMG-Mercedes	AMG-Mercedes C-Klasse 2004	2:33.391	2:41.078	9
10	3	(United Kingdom) Gary Paffett	DaimlerChrysler Bank AMG-Mercedes	AMG-Mercedes C-Klasse 2005	2:34.036	—N/a	10
11	16	(Germany) Stefan Mücke	Mücke Motorsport	AMG-Mercedes C-Klasse 2004	2:34.293	—N/a	11
12	7	(Germany) Bernd Schneider	Vodafone AMG-Mercedes	AMG-Mercedes C-Klasse 2005	2:34.364	—N/a	12
13	6	(United Kingdom) Allan McNish	Audi Sport Team Abt	Audi A4 DTM 2005	2:34.454	—N/a	13
14	2	(Germany) Martin Tomczyk	Audi Sport Team Abt Sportsline	Audi A4 DTM 2005	2:34.788	—N/a	14
15	17	(Greece) Alexandros Margaritis	Mücke Motorsport	AMG-Mercedes C-Klasse 2004	2:34.976	—N/a	15
16	10	(Germany) Heinz-Harald Frentzen	Stern Team OPC	Opel Vectra GTS V8 2005	2:35.215	—N/a	16
17	12	(Germany) Manuel Reuter	Team OPC	Opel Vectra GTS V8 2005	2:35.476	—N/a	17
18	18	(Italy) Rinaldo Capello	Audi Sport Team Joest	Audi A4 DTM 2004	2:36.366	—N/a	18
19	20	(Canada) Bruno Spengler	Junge Gebrauchte von Mercedes AMG-Mercedes	AMG-Mercedes C-Klasse 2004	2:37.118	—N/a	19
20	19	(Germany) Frank Stippler	Audi Sport Team Joest	Audi A4 DTM 2004	2:37.164	—N/a	20

=== Race ===
Pos.	No.	Driver	Team	Car	Laps	Time / Retired	Grid	Pts.
1	8	(Finland) Mika Häkkinen	Sport Edition AMG-Mercedes	AMG-Mercedes C-Klasse 2005	24	54:34.544	1	10
2	1	(Sweden) Mattias Ekström	Audi Sport Team Abt Sportsline	Audi A4 DTM 2005	24	+4.258	2	8
3	5	(Denmark) Tom Kristensen	Audi Sport Team Abt	Audi A4 DTM 2005	24	+5.976	6	6
4	4	(France) Jean Alesi	AMG-Mercedes	AMG-Mercedes C-Klasse 2005	24	+10.088	8	5
5	9	(Switzerland) Marcel Fässler	GMAC Team OPC	Opel Vectra GTS V8 2005	24	+27.801	4	4
6	2	(Germany) Martin Tomczyk	Audi Sport Team Abt Sportsline	Audi A4 DTM 2005	24	+28.001	14	3
7	11	(France) Laurent Aïello	Team OPC	Opel Vectra GTS V8 2005	24	+33.516	7	2
8	3	(United Kingdom) Gary Paffett	DaimlerChrysler Bank AMG-Mercedes	AMG-Mercedes C-Klasse 2005	24	+40.407	10	1
9	17	(Greece) Alexandros Margaritis	Mücke Motorsport	AMG-Mercedes C-Klasse 2004	24	+50.255	15	
10	14	(Germany) Christian Abt	Audi Sport Team Joest Racing	Audi A4 DTM 2004	24	+50.856	3	
11	19	(Germany) Frank Stippler	Audi Sport Team Joest	Audi A4 DTM 2004	24	+51.402	20	
12	16	(Germany) Stefan Mücke	Mücke Motorsport	AMG-Mercedes C-Klasse 2004	24	+55.593	11	
13	18	(Italy) Rinaldo Capello	Audi Sport Team Joest	Audi A4 DTM 2004	24	+55.961	18	
14	15	(Germany) Pierre Kaffer	Audi Sport Team Joest Racing	Audi A4 DTM 2004	24	+56.711	5	
15	10	(Germany) Heinz-Harald Frentzen	Stern Team OPC	Opel Vectra GTS V8 2005	24	+1:28.708	16	
16	12	(Germany) Manuel Reuter	Team OPC	Opel Vectra GTS V8 2005	23	+1 lap	17	
17	7	(Germany) Bernd Schneider	Vodafone AMG-Mercedes	AMG-Mercedes C-Klasse 2005	22	+2 laps	12	
18	6	(United Kingdom) Allan McNish	Audi Sport Team Abt	Audi A4 DTM 2005	21	+3 laps	13	
19	21	(United Kingdom) Jamie Green	Salzgitter AMG-Mercedes	AMG-Mercedes C-Klasse 2004	20	+4 laps	9	
Ret	20	(Canada) Bruno Spengler	Junge Gebrauchte von Mercedes AMG-Mercedes	AMG-Mercedes C-Klasse 2004	11	Damage	19	
Fastest lap: Mika Häkkinen - 2:13.134 (lap 13)

== Championship standings after the race ==
Pos.	Drivers' championship			Teams' championship			Manufacturers' championship		
Pos.	Move	Driver	Points	Move	Team	Points	Move	Manufacturer	Points
1		(United Kingdom) Gary Paffett	19		(Germany) DaimlerChrysler Bank AMG-Mercedes	36		(Germany) Mercedes-Benz	65
2	3	(Finland) Mika Häkkinen	17		(Germany) Vodafone/Sport Edition AMG-Mercedes	23		(Germany) Audi	46
3	1	(France) Jean Alesi	17	1	(Germany) Audi Sport Team Abt Sportsline	20		(Germany) Opel	6
4	1	(Sweden) Mattias Ekström	17	1	(Germany) Audi Sport Team Abt	14			
5	1	(Denmark) Tom Kristensen	14	2	(Germany) Audi Sport Team Joest Racing	9			

- Note: Only the top five positions are included for three sets of standings.

Previous race: 2005 1st Lausitzring DTM round	Deutsche Tourenwagen Masters; 2005 season	Next race: 2005 Brno DTM round
