= 2005 2nd Hockenheim DTM round =

Final round of the 2005 Deutsche Tourenwagen Masters

(Germany) 2005 DTM Hockenheimring round
Round details
Round 11 of 11 rounds in the
2005 Deutsche Tourenwagen Masters season
← Previous race
- Location: Hockenheimring, Hockenheim, Germany
- Course: Permanent racing facility 4.574 km (2.842 mi)

Deutsche Tourenwagen Masters

Race
- Date: 23 October 2005
- Laps: 36

Pole position
Driver	(United Kingdom) Jamie Green	Salzgitter AMG-Mercedes
- Time: 1:45.294

Podium
First	(Germany) Bernd Schneider	Vodafone AMG-Mercedes
Second	(United Kingdom) Jamie Green	Salzgitter AMG-Mercedes
Third	(United Kingdom) Gary Paffett	DaimlerChrysler Bank AMG-Mercedes

Fastest lap
Driver	(United Kingdom) Jamie Green	Salzgitter AMG-Mercedes
- Time: 1:34.868 (on lap 29)

The 2005 2nd Hockenheim DTM round was a motor racing event for the Deutsche Tourenwagen Masters held between 21–23 October 2005. The event, part of the 19th season of the DTM, was held at the Hockenheimring in Germany.

== Results ==
=== Qualifying ===
Pos.	No.	Driver	Team	Car	Q	SP	Grid
1	21	(United Kingdom) Jamie Green	Salzgitter AMG-Mercedes	AMG-Mercedes C-Klasse 2004	1:50.066	1:45.294	1
2	5	(Denmark) Tom Kristensen	Audi Sport Team Abt	Audi A4 DTM 2005	1:50.227	1:45.370	2
3	7	(Germany) Bernd Schneider	Vodafone AMG-Mercedes	AMG-Mercedes C-Klasse 2005	1:49.585	1:45.871	3
4	10	(Germany) Heinz-Harald Frentzen	Stern Team OPC	Opel Vectra GTS V8 2005	1:50.079	1:45.888	4
5	19	(Germany) Frank Stippler	Audi Sport Team Joest	Audi A4 DTM 2004	1:50.446	1:46.961	5
6	3	(United Kingdom) Gary Paffett	DaimlerChrysler Bank AMG-Mercedes	AMG-Mercedes C-Klasse 2005	1:50.245	1:47.141	6
7	2	(Germany) Martin Tomczyk	Audi Sport Team Abt Sportsline	Audi A4 DTM 2005	1:50.788	1:49.328	7
8	9	(Switzerland) Marcel Fässler	GMAC Team OPC	Opel Vectra GTS V8 2005	1:50.503	1:49.378	8
9	8	(Finland) Mika Häkkinen	Sport Edition AMG-Mercedes	AMG-Mercedes C-Klasse 2005	1:50.665	1:50.303	9
10	11	(France) Laurent Aïello	Team OPC	Opel Vectra GTS V8 2005	1:50.709	1:54.764	10
11	17	(Greece) Alexandros Margaritis	Mücke Motorsport	AMG-Mercedes C-Klasse 2004	1:50.789	—N/a	11
12	12	(Germany) Manuel Reuter	Team OPC	Opel Vectra GTS V8 2005	1:50.809	—N/a	12
13	20	(Canada) Bruno Spengler	Junge Gebrauchte von Mercedes AMG-Mercedes	AMG-Mercedes C-Klasse 2004	1:50.845	—N/a	13
14	4	(France) Jean Alesi	AMG-Mercedes	AMG-Mercedes C-Klasse 2005	1:50.943	—N/a	14
15	1	(Sweden) Mattias Ekström	Audi Sport Team Abt Sportsline	Audi A4 DTM 2005	1:51.003	—N/a	15
16	6	(United Kingdom) Allan McNish	Audi Sport Team Abt	Audi A4 DTM 2005	1:51.020	—N/a	16
17	18	(Italy) Rinaldo Capello	Audi Sport Team Joest	Audi A4 DTM 2004	1:51.173	—N/a	17
18	14	(Germany) Christian Abt	Audi Sport Team Joest Racing	Audi A4 DTM 2004	1:51.358	—N/a	18
19	15	(Germany) Pierre Kaffer	Audi Sport Team Joest Racing	Audi A4 DTM 2004	1:51.578	—N/a	19
20	16	(Germany) Stefan Mücke	Mücke Motorsport	AMG-Mercedes C-Klasse 2004	1:52.239	—N/a	20

=== Race ===
Pos.	No.	Driver	Team	Car	Laps	Time / Retired	Grid	Pts.
1	7	(Germany) Bernd Schneider	Vodafone AMG-Mercedes	AMG-Mercedes C-Klasse 2005	36	1:02:12.480	3	10
2	21	(United Kingdom) Jamie Green	Salzgitter AMG-Mercedes	AMG-Mercedes C-Klasse 2004	36	+8.076	1	8
3	3	(United Kingdom) Gary Paffett	DaimlerChrysler Bank AMG-Mercedes	AMG-Mercedes C-Klasse 2005	36	+15.986	6	6
4	5	(Denmark) Tom Kristensen	Audi Sport Team Abt	Audi A4 DTM 2005	36	+16.593	2	5
5	19	(Germany) Frank Stippler	Audi Sport Team Joest	Audi A4 DTM 2004	36	+26.818	5	4
6	9	(Switzerland) Marcel Fässler	GMAC Team OPC	Opel Vectra GTS V8 2005	36	+42.911	8	3
7	1	(Sweden) Mattias Ekström	Audi Sport Team Abt Sportsline	Audi A4 DTM 2005	36	+44.491	15	2
8	20	(Canada) Bruno Spengler	Junge Gebrauchte von Mercedes AMG-Mercedes	AMG-Mercedes C-Klasse 2004	36	+45.756	13	1
9	11	(France) Laurent Aïello	Team OPC	Opel Vectra GTS V8 2005	36	+48.300	10	
10	15	(Germany) Pierre Kaffer	Audi Sport Team Joest Racing	Audi A4 DTM 2004	36	+50.028	19	
11	16	(Germany) Stefan Mücke	Mücke Motorsport	AMG-Mercedes C-Klasse 2004	36	+52.599	20	
12	12	(Germany) Manuel Reuter	Team OPC	Opel Vectra GTS V8 2005	36	+50.043	12	
13	4	(France) Jean Alesi	AMG-Mercedes	AMG-Mercedes C-Klasse 2005	36	+59.342	14	
14	14	(Germany) Christian Abt	Audi Sport Team Joest Racing	Audi A4 DTM 2004	36	+1:02.629	18	
15	8	(Finland) Mika Häkkinen	Sport Edition AMG-Mercedes	AMG-Mercedes C-Klasse 2005	36	+1:16.053	9	
16	18	(Italy) Rinaldo Capello	Audi Sport Team Joest	Audi A4 DTM 2004	35	+1 lap	17	
17	6	(United Kingdom) Allan McNish	Audi Sport Team Abt	Audi A4 DTM 2005	35	+1 lap	16	
18	10	(Germany) Heinz-Harald Frentzen	Stern Team OPC	Opel Vectra GTS V8 2005	29	+7 laps	4	
Ret	2	(Germany) Martin Tomczyk	Audi Sport Team Abt Sportsline	Audi A4 DTM 2005	19	Accident	7	
Ret	17	(Greece) Alexandros Margaritis	Mücke Motorsport	AMG-Mercedes C-Klasse 2004	18	Accident	11	
Fastest lap: Jamie Green - 1:34.868 (lap 29)

== Championship standings after the race ==
- **Bold text** indicates 2005 champions.

Pos.	Drivers' championship			Teams' championship			Manufacturers' championship		
Pos.	Move	Driver	Points	Move	Team	Points	Move	Manufacturer	Points
1		(United Kingdom) **Gary Paffett**	84		(Germany) **DaimlerChrysler Bank AMG-Mercedes**	106		(Germany) **Mercedes-Benz**	205
2		(Sweden) Mattias Ekström	71		(Germany) Audi Sport Team Abt Sportsline	81		(Germany) Audi	179
3		(Denmark) Tom Kristensen	56		(Germany) Audi Sport Team Abt	69		(Germany) Opel	45
4	2	(Germany) Bernd Schneider	32		(Germany) Vodafone/Sport Edition AMG-Mercedes	62			
5	1	(Finland) Mika Häkkinen	30	1	(Germany) Salzgitter/Junge Gebrauchte von Mercedes AMG-Mercedes	34			

- Note: Only the top five positions are included for three sets of standings.

Previous race: 2005 Istanbul DTM round	Deutsche Tourenwagen Masters; 2005 season	Next race: 2006 Hockenheim DTM round
