= 2005 1st Hockenheim DTM round =

1st round of the 2005 Deutsche Tourenwagen Masters

(Germany) 2005 DTM Hockenheimring round
Round details
Round 1 of 11 rounds in the
2005 Deutsche Tourenwagen Masters season
Next race →
- Location: Hockenheimring, Hockenheim, Germany
- Course: Permanent racing facility 4.574 km (2.842 mi)

Deutsche Tourenwagen Masters

Race
- Date: 17 April 2005
- Laps: 37

Pole position
Driver	(Sweden) Mattias Ekström	Audi Sport Team Abt Sportsline
- Time: 1:35.251

Podium
First	(France) Jean Alesi	AMG-Mercedes
Second	(United Kingdom) Gary Paffett	DaimlerChrysler Bank AMG-Mercedes
Third	(Germany) Bernd Schneider	Vodafone AMG-Mercedes

Fastest lap
Driver	(United Kingdom) Jamie Green	Salzgitter AMG-Mercedes
- Time: 1:35.262 (on lap 23)

The 2005 Hockenheim DTM round was a motor racing event for the Deutsche Tourenwagen Masters held between 15 and 17 April 2005. The event, part of the 19th season of the DTM, was held at the Hockenheimring in Germany.

== Results ==
=== Qualifying ===
Pos.	No.	Driver	Team	Car	Q	SP	Grid
1	1	(Sweden) Mattias Ekström	Audi Sport Team Abt Sportsline	Audi A4 DTM 2005	1:35.234	1:35.251	1
2	3	(United Kingdom) Gary Paffett	DaimlerChrysler Bank AMG-Mercedes	AMG-Mercedes C-Klasse 2005	1:34.996	1:35.283	2
3	21	(United Kingdom) Jamie Green	Salzgitter AMG-Mercedes	AMG-Mercedes C-Klasse 2004	1:35.064	1:35.809	3
4	9	(Switzerland) Marcel Fässler	GMAC Team OPC	Opel Vectra GTS V8 2005	1:35.283	1:36.075	4
5	4	(France) Jean Alesi	AMG-Mercedes	AMG-Mercedes C-Klasse 2005	1:35.288	1:36.179	5
6	20	(Canada) Bruno Spengler	Junge Gebrauchte von Mercedes AMG-Mercedes	AMG-Mercedes C-Klasse 2004	1:35.156	1:36.191	6
7	2	(Germany) Martin Tomczyk	Audi Sport Team Abt Sportsline	Audi A4 DTM 2005	1:35.304	1:36.222	7
8	7	(Germany) Bernd Schneider	Vodafone AMG-Mercedes	AMG-Mercedes C-Klasse 2005	1:34.648	1:36.354	8
9	5	(Denmark) Tom Kristensen	Audi Sport Team Abt	Audi A4 DTM 2005	1:34.817	1:36.489	9
10	16	(Germany) Stefan Mücke	Mücke Motorsport	AMG-Mercedes C-Klasse 2004	1:35.434	1:36.587	10
11	11	(France) Laurent Aïello	Team OPC	Opel Vectra GTS V8 2005	1:35.435	—N/a	11
12	14	(Germany) Christian Abt	Audi Sport Team Joest Racing	Audi A4 DTM 2004	1:35.464	—N/a	12
13	19	(Germany) Frank Stippler	Audi Sport Team Joest	Audi A4 DTM 2004	1:35.467	—N/a	13
14	6	(United Kingdom) Allan McNish	Audi Sport Team Abt	Audi A4 DTM 2005	1:35.625	—N/a	14
15	8	(Finland) Mika Häkkinen	Sport Edition AMG-Mercedes	AMG-Mercedes C-Klasse 2005	1:35.697	—N/a	15
16	17	(Greece) Alexandros Margaritis	Mücke Motorsport	AMG-Mercedes C-Klasse 2004	1:35.756	—N/a	16
17	12	(Germany) Manuel Reuter	Team OPC	Opel Vectra GTS V8 2005	1:35.880	—N/a	17
18	15	(Germany) Pierre Kaffer	Audi Sport Team Joest Racing	Audi A4 DTM 2004	1:35.915	—N/a	18
19	10	(Germany) Heinz-Harald Frentzen	Stern Team OPC	Opel Vectra GTS V8 2005	1:35.967	—N/a	19
20	18	(Italy) Rinaldo Capello	Audi Sport Team Joest	Audi A4 DTM 2004	1:36.020	—N/a	20

=== Race ===
Pos.	No.	Driver	Team	Car	Laps	Time / Retired	Grid	Pts.
1	4	(France) Jean Alesi	AMG-Mercedes	AMG-Mercedes C-Klasse 2005	37	1:04:48.245	5	10
2	3	(United Kingdom) Gary Paffett	DaimlerChrysler Bank AMG-Mercedes	AMG-Mercedes C-Klasse 2005	37	+5.643	2	8
3	7	(Germany) Bernd Schneider	Vodafone AMG-Mercedes	AMG-Mercedes C-Klasse 2005	37	+6.420	8	6
4	14	(Germany) Christian Abt	Audi Sport Team Joest Racing	Audi A4 DTM 2004	37	+8.955	12	5
5	1	(Sweden) Mattias Ekström	Audi Sport Team Abt Sportsline	Audi A4 DTM 2005	37	+12.937	1	4
6	21	(United Kingdom) Jamie Green	Salzgitter AMG-Mercedes	AMG-Mercedes C-Klasse 2004	37	+16.421	3	3
7	16	(Germany) Stefan Mücke	Mücke Motorsport	AMG-Mercedes C-Klasse 2004	37	+20.565	10	2
8	8	(Finland) Mika Häkkinen	Sport Edition AMG-Mercedes	AMG-Mercedes C-Klasse 2005	37	+22.065	15	1
9	9	(Switzerland) Marcel Fässler	GMAC Team OPC	Opel Vectra GTS V8 2005	37	+27.588	4	
10	19	(Germany) Frank Stippler	Audi Sport Team Joest	Audi A4 DTM 2004	37	+28.002	13	
11	6	(United Kingdom) Allan McNish	Audi Sport Team Abt	Audi A4 DTM 2005	37	+36.232	14	
12	20	(Canada) Bruno Spengler	Junge Gebrauchte von Mercedes AMG-Mercedes	AMG-Mercedes C-Klasse 2004	37	+36.805	6	
13	15	(Germany) Pierre Kaffer	Audi Sport Team Joest Racing	Audi A4 DTM 2004	28	+9 laps	18	
Ret	17	(Greece) Alexandros Margaritis	Mücke Motorsport	AMG-Mercedes C-Klasse 2004	15	Collision damage	16	
Ret	10	(Germany) Heinz-Harald Frentzen	Stern Team OPC	Opel Vectra GTS V8 2005	12	Retired	19	
Ret	2	(Germany) Martin Tomczyk	Audi Sport Team Abt Sportsline	Audi A4 DTM 2005	3	Retired	7	
Ret	12	(Germany) Manuel Reuter	Team OPC	Opel Vectra GTS V8 2005	1	Collision damage	17	
Ret	18	(Italy) Rinaldo Capello	Audi Sport Team Joest	Audi A4 DTM 2004	0	Collision	20	
Ret	5	(Denmark) Tom Kristensen	Audi Sport Team Abt	Audi A4 DTM 2005	0	Collision	9	
Ret	11	(France) Laurent Aïello	Team OPC	Opel Vectra GTS V8 2005	0	Collision	11	
Fastest lap: Jamie Green - 1:35.262 (lap 23)

== Championship standings after the race ==
Pos.	Drivers' championship			Teams' championship			Manufacturers' championship		
Pos.	Move	Driver	Points	Move	Team	Points	Move	Manufacturer	Points
1		(France) Jean Alesi	10		(Germany) DaimlerChrysler Bank AMG-Mercedes	18		(Germany) Mercedes-Benz	30
2		(United Kingdom) Gary Paffett	8		(Germany) Vodafone/Sport Edition AMG-Mercedes	7		(Germany) Audi	9
3		(Germany) Bernd Schneider	6		(Germany) Audi Sport Team Joest Racing	5		(Germany) Opel	0
4		(Germany) Christian Abt	5		(Germany) Audi Sport Team Abt Sportsline	4			
5		(Sweden) Mattias Ekström	4		(Germany) Salzgitter/Junge Gebrauchte von Mercedes AMG-Mercedes	3			

- Note: Only the top five positions are included for three sets of standings.

Previous race: 2004 2nd Hockenheim DTM round	Deutsche Tourenwagen Masters; 2005 season	Next race: 2005 1st Lausitzring DTM round
