= 2005 Oschersleben DTM round =

5th round of the 2005 Deutsche Tourenwagen Masters

(Germany) 2005 DTM Oschersleben round
Round details
Round 5 of 11 rounds in the
2005 Deutsche Tourenwagen Masters season
← Previous race	Next race →
- Location: Motorsport Arena Oschersleben, Oschersleben, Germany
- Course: Permanent racing facility 3.668 km (2.279 mi)

Deutsche Tourenwagen Masters

Race
- Date: 26 June 2005
- Laps: 44

Pole position
Driver	(Denmark) Tom Kristensen	Audi Sport Team Abt
- Time: 1:20.218

Podium
First	(United Kingdom) Gary Paffett	DaimlerChrysler Bank AMG-Mercedes
Second	(Sweden) Mattias Ekström	Audi Sport Team Abt Sportsline
Third	(United Kingdom) Jamie Green	Salzgitter AMG-Mercedes

Fastest lap
Driver	(Sweden) Mattias Ekström	Audi Sport Team Abt Sportsline
- Time: 1:20.791 (on lap 21)

The 2005 Oschersleben DTM round was a motor racing event for the Deutsche Tourenwagen Masters held between 24 and 26 June 2005. The event, part of the 19th season of the DTM, was held at the Motorsport Arena Oschersleben in Germany.

== Results ==
=== Qualifying ===
Super pole was cancelled due to heavy rain. Grid order was set by qualifying results.

Pos.	No.	Driver	Team	Car	Q	Grid
1	5	(Denmark) Tom Kristensen	Audi Sport Team Abt	Audi A4 DTM 2005	1:20.218	1
2	2	(Germany) Martin Tomczyk	Audi Sport Team Abt Sportsline	Audi A4 DTM 2005	1:20.989	2
3	3	(United Kingdom) Gary Paffett	DaimlerChrysler Bank AMG-Mercedes	AMG-Mercedes C-Klasse 2005	1:21.004	3
4	21	(United Kingdom) Jamie Green	Salzgitter AMG-Mercedes	AMG-Mercedes C-Klasse 2004	1:21.053	4
5	1	(Sweden) Mattias Ekström	Audi Sport Team Abt Sportsline	Audi A4 DTM 2005	1:21.058	5
6	11	(France) Laurent Aïello	Team OPC	Opel Vectra GTS V8 2005	1:21.229	6
7	20	(Canada) Bruno Spengler	Junge Gebrauchte von Mercedes AMG-Mercedes	AMG-Mercedes C-Klasse 2004	1:21.373	7
8	6	(United Kingdom) Allan McNish	Audi Sport Team Abt	Audi A4 DTM 2005	1:21.374	8
9	19	(Germany) Frank Stippler	Audi Sport Team Joest	Audi A4 DTM 2004	1:21.397	9
10	7	(Germany) Bernd Schneider	Vodafone AMG-Mercedes	AMG-Mercedes C-Klasse 2005	1:21.453	10
11	18	(Italy) Rinaldo Capello	Audi Sport Team Joest	Audi A4 DTM 2004	1:21.458	11
12	9	(Switzerland) Marcel Fässler	GMAC Team OPC	Opel Vectra GTS V8 2005	1:21.961	12
13	16	(Germany) Stefan Mücke	Mücke Motorsport	AMG-Mercedes C-Klasse 2004	1:21.963	13
14	10	(Germany) Heinz-Harald Frentzen	Stern Team OPC	Opel Vectra GTS V8 2005	1:22.170	14
15	15	(Germany) Pierre Kaffer	Audi Sport Team Joest Racing	Audi A4 DTM 2004	1:22.307	15
16	17	(Greece) Alexandros Margaritis	Mücke Motorsport	AMG-Mercedes C-Klasse 2004	1:22.387	16
17	14	(Germany) Christian Abt	Audi Sport Team Joest Racing	Audi A4 DTM 2004	1:22.482	17
18	12	(Germany) Manuel Reuter	Team OPC	Opel Vectra GTS V8 2005	1:22.551	18
19	4	(France) Jean Alesi	AMG-Mercedes	AMG-Mercedes C-Klasse 2005	1:22.575	19
20	8	(Finland) Mika Häkkinen	Sport Edition AMG-Mercedes	AMG-Mercedes C-Klasse 2005	1:24.938	20

=== Race ===
Pos.	No.	Driver	Team	Car	Laps	Time / Retired	Grid	Pts.
1	3	(United Kingdom) Gary Paffett	DaimlerChrysler Bank AMG-Mercedes	AMG-Mercedes C-Klasse 2005	44	1:01:15.183	3	10
2	1	(Sweden) Mattias Ekström	Audi Sport Team Abt Sportsline	Audi A4 DTM 2005	44	+3.169	5	8
3	21	(United Kingdom) Jamie Green	Salzgitter AMG-Mercedes	AMG-Mercedes C-Klasse 2004	44	+10.460	4	6
4	7	(Germany) Bernd Schneider	Vodafone AMG-Mercedes	AMG-Mercedes C-Klasse 2005	44	+24.658	10	5
5	5	(Denmark) Tom Kristensen	Audi Sport Team Abt	Audi A4 DTM 2005	44	+25.219	1	4
6	6	(United Kingdom) Allan McNish	Audi Sport Team Abt	Audi A4 DTM 2005	44	+26.131	8	3
7	11	(France) Laurent Aïello	Team OPC	Opel Vectra GTS V8 2005	44	+26.771	6	2
8	9	(Switzerland) Marcel Fässler	GMAC Team OPC	Opel Vectra GTS V8 2005	44	+39.750	12	1
9	19	(Germany) Frank Stippler	Audi Sport Team Joest	Audi A4 DTM 2004	44	+40.322	9	
10	18	(Italy) Rinaldo Capello	Audi Sport Team Joest	Audi A4 DTM 2004	44	+42.430	11	
11	16	(Germany) Stefan Mücke	Mücke Motorsport	AMG-Mercedes C-Klasse 2004	44	+44.065	13	
12	14	(Germany) Christian Abt	Audi Sport Team Joest Racing	Audi A4 DTM 2004	44	+45.175	17	
13	4	(France) Jean Alesi	AMG-Mercedes	AMG-Mercedes C-Klasse 2005	44	+45.578	19	
14	10	(Germany) Heinz-Harald Frentzen	Stern Team OPC	Opel Vectra GTS V8 2005	44	+49.130	14	
15	12	(Germany) Manuel Reuter	Team OPC	Opel Vectra GTS V8 2005	44	+49.943	18	
16	20	(Canada) Bruno Spengler	Junge Gebrauchte von Mercedes AMG-Mercedes	AMG-Mercedes C-Klasse 2004	44	+50.217	7	
17	15	(Germany) Pierre Kaffer	Audi Sport Team Joest Racing	Audi A4 DTM 2004	44	+51.541	15	
18	17	(Greece) Alexandros Margaritis	Mücke Motorsport	AMG-Mercedes C-Klasse 2004	44	+1:04.353	16	
Ret	2	(Germany) Martin Tomczyk	Audi Sport Team Abt Sportsline	Audi A4 DTM 2005	32	Suspension	2	
Ret	8	(Finland) Mika Häkkinen	Sport Edition AMG-Mercedes	AMG-Mercedes C-Klasse 2005	8	Accident	20	
Fastest lap: Mattias Ekström - 1:20.791 (lap 21)

== Championship standings after the race ==
Pos.	Drivers' championship			Teams' championship			Manufacturers' championship		
Pos.	Move	Driver	Points	Move	Team	Points	Move	Manufacturer	Points
1		(Sweden) Mattias Ekström	35		(Germany) DaimlerChrysler Bank AMG-Mercedes	51		(Germany) Mercedes-Benz	95
2		(United Kingdom) Gary Paffett	34		(Germany) Audi Sport Team Abt Sportsline	38		(Germany) Audi	85
3		(Denmark) Tom Kristensen	26		(Germany) Audi Sport Team Abt	31		(Germany) Opel	15
4		(Finland) Mika Häkkinen	17		(Germany) Vodafone/Sport Edition AMG-Mercedes	28			
5		(France) Jean Alesi	17	2	(Germany) Salzgitter/Junge Gebrauchte von Mercedes AMG-Mercedes	13			

- Note: Only the top five positions are included for three sets of standings.

Previous race: 2005 Brno DTM round	Deutsche Tourenwagen Masters; 2005 season	Next race: 2005 Norisring DTM round
