= 2005 Norisring DTM round =

6th round of the 2005 Deutsche Tourenwagen Masters

(Germany) 2005 DTM Norisring round
Round details
Round 6 of 11 rounds in the
2005 Deutsche Tourenwagen Masters season
| ← Previous race | Next race → |
- Location: Norisring, Nuremberg, Germany
- Course: Permanent racing facility 2.300 km (1.429 mi)

Deutsche Tourenwagen Masters

Race
- Date: 17 July 2005
- Laps: 72

Pole position
| Driver | (Denmark) Tom Kristensen | Audi Sport Team Abt |
- Time: 48.446

Podium
| First | (United Kingdom) Gary Paffett | DaimlerChrysler Bank AMG-Mercedes |
| Second | (Germany) Christian Abt | Audi Sport Team Joest Racing |
| Third | (Sweden) Mattias Ekström | Audi Sport Team Abt Sportsline |

Fastest lap
| Driver | (United Kingdom) Gary Paffett | DaimlerChrysler Bank AMG-Mercedes |
- Time: 48.922 (on lap 5)

The 2005 Norisring DTM round was a motor racing event for the Deutsche Tourenwagen Masters held between 15 and 17 July 2005. The event, part of the 19th season of the DTM, was held at the Norisring in Germany.

== Results ==
=== Qualifying ===
| Pos. | No. | Driver | Team | Car | Q | SP | Grid |
|---|---|---|---|---|---|---|---|
| 1 | 5 | (Denmark) Tom Kristensen | Audi Sport Team Abt | Audi A4 DTM 2005 | 48.329 | 48.446 | 1 |
| 2 | 3 | (United Kingdom) Gary Paffett | DaimlerChrysler Bank AMG-Mercedes | AMG-Mercedes C-Klasse 2005 | 48.257 | 48.455 | 2 |
| 3 | 20 | (Canada) Bruno Spengler | Junge Gebrauchte von Mercedes AMG-Mercedes | AMG-Mercedes C-Klasse 2004 | 48.351 | 48.469 | 3 |
| 4 | 4 | (France) Jean Alesi | AMG-Mercedes | AMG-Mercedes C-Klasse 2005 | 48.311 | 48.497 | 4 |
| 5 | 1 | (Sweden) Mattias Ekström | Audi Sport Team Abt Sportsline | Audi A4 DTM 2005 | 48.505 | 48.542 | 5 |
| 6 | 12 | (Germany) Manuel Reuter | Team OPC | Opel Vectra GTS V8 2005 | 48.717 | 48.729 | 6 |
| 7 | 8 | (Finland) Mika Häkkinen | Sport Edition AMG-Mercedes | AMG-Mercedes C-Klasse 2005 | 48.474 | 48.745 | 7 |
| 8 | 9 | (Switzerland) Marcel Fässler | GMAC Team OPC | Opel Vectra GTS V8 2005 | 48.596 | 48.833 | 8 |
| 9 | 21 | (United Kingdom) Jamie Green | Salzgitter AMG-Mercedes | AMG-Mercedes C-Klasse 2004 | 48.482 | 48.869 | 9 |
| 10 | 7 | (Germany) Bernd Schneider | Vodafone AMG-Mercedes | AMG-Mercedes C-Klasse 2005 | 48.572 | 48.959 | 10 |
| 11 | 10 | (Germany) Heinz-Harald Frentzen | Stern Team OPC | Opel Vectra GTS V8 2005 | 48.750 | —N/a | 11 |
| 12 | 6 | (United Kingdom) Allan McNish | Audi Sport Team Abt | Audi A4 DTM 2005 | 48.861 | —N/a | 12 |
| 13 | 19 | (Germany) Frank Stippler | Audi Sport Team Joest | Audi A4 DTM 2004 | 48.880 | —N/a | 13 |
| 14 | 2 | (Germany) Martin Tomczyk | Audi Sport Team Abt Sportsline | Audi A4 DTM 2005 | 48.968 | —N/a | 14 |
| 15 | 18 | (Italy) Rinaldo Capello | Audi Sport Team Joest | Audi A4 DTM 2004 | 49.018 | —N/a | 15 |
| 16 | 16 | (Germany) Stefan Mücke | Mücke Motorsport | AMG-Mercedes C-Klasse 2004 | 49.046 | —N/a | 16 |
| 17 | 14 | (Germany) Christian Abt | Audi Sport Team Joest Racing | Audi A4 DTM 2004 | 49.106 | —N/a | 17 |
| 18 | 17 | (Greece) Alexandros Margaritis | Mücke Motorsport | AMG-Mercedes C-Klasse 2004 | 49.207 | —N/a | 18 |
| 19 | 15 | (Germany) Pierre Kaffer | Audi Sport Team Joest Racing | Audi A4 DTM 2004 | 49.489 | —N/a | 19 |
| 20 | 11 | (France) Laurent Aïello | Team OPC | Opel Vectra GTS V8 2005 | 49.578 | —N/a | 20 |

=== Race ===
| Pos. | No. | Driver | Team | Car | Laps | Time / Retired | Grid | Pts. |
|---|---|---|---|---|---|---|---|---|
| 1 | 3 | (United Kingdom) Gary Paffett | DaimlerChrysler Bank AMG-Mercedes | AMG-Mercedes C-Klasse 2005 | 72 | 1:05:58.262 | 2 | 10 |
| 2 | 14 | (Germany) Christian Abt | Audi Sport Team Joest Racing | Audi A4 DTM 2004 | 72 | +3.627 | 17 | 8 |
| 3 | 1 | (Sweden) Mattias Ekström | Audi Sport Team Abt Sportsline | Audi A4 DTM 2005 | 72 | +6.269 | 5 | 6 |
| 4 | 6 | (United Kingdom) Allan McNish | Audi Sport Team Abt | Audi A4 DTM 2005 | 72 | +13.251 | 12 | 5 |
| 5 | 2 | (Germany) Martin Tomczyk | Audi Sport Team Abt Sportsline | Audi A4 DTM 2005 | 72 | +13.615 | 14 | 4 |
| 6 | 10 | (Germany) Heinz-Harald Frentzen | Stern Team OPC | Opel Vectra GTS V8 2005 | 72 | +14.538 | 11 | 3 |
| 7 | 5 | (Denmark) Tom Kristensen | Audi Sport Team Abt | Audi A4 DTM 2005 | 72 | +21.917 | 1 | 2 |
| 8 | 15 | (Germany) Pierre Kaffer | Audi Sport Team Joest Racing | Audi A4 DTM 2004 | 72 | +23.310 | 19 | 1 |
| 9 | 12 | (Germany) Manuel Reuter | Team OPC | Opel Vectra GTS V8 2005 | 72 | +34.250 | 6 | |
| 10 | 7 | (Germany) Bernd Schneider | Vodafone AMG-Mercedes | AMG-Mercedes C-Klasse 2005 | 72 | +56.012 | 10 | |
| 11 | 17 | (Greece) Alexandros Margaritis | Mücke Motorsport | AMG-Mercedes C-Klasse 2004 | 71 | +1 lap | 18 | |
| 12 | 11 | (France) Laurent Aïello | Team OPC | Opel Vectra GTS V8 2005 | 61 | +11 laps | 20 | |
| 13 | 20 | (Canada) Bruno Spengler | Junge Gebrauchte von Mercedes AMG-Mercedes | AMG-Mercedes C-Klasse 2004 | 59 | +13 laps | 3 | |
| Ret | 16 | (Germany) Stefan Mücke | Mücke Motorsport | AMG-Mercedes C-Klasse 2004 | 39 | Retired | 16 | |
| Ret | 9 | (Switzerland) Marcel Fässler | GMAC Team OPC | Opel Vectra GTS V8 2005 | 30 | Accident | 8 | |
| Ret | 18 | (Italy) Rinaldo Capello | Audi Sport Team Joest | Audi A4 DTM 2004 | 29 | Accident | 15 | |
| Ret | 4 | (France) Jean Alesi | AMG-Mercedes | AMG-Mercedes C-Klasse 2005 | 23 | Engine | 4 | |
| Ret | 19 | (Germany) Frank Stippler | Audi Sport Team Joest | Audi A4 DTM 2004 | 8 | Collision damage | 13 | |
| Ret | 21 | (United Kingdom) Jamie Green | Salzgitter AMG-Mercedes | AMG-Mercedes C-Klasse 2004 | 6 | Collision damage | 9 | |
| Ret | 8 | (Finland) Mika Häkkinen | Sport Edition AMG-Mercedes | AMG-Mercedes C-Klasse 2005 | 5 | Collision | 7 | |
Fastest lap: Gary Paffett - 48.922 (lap 5)

== Championship standings after the race ==
| Pos. | Drivers' championship | | | Teams' championship | | | Manufacturers' championship | | |
| Pos. | Move | Driver | Points | Move | Team | Points | Move | Manufacturer | Points |
|---|---|---|---|---|---|---|---|---|---|
| 1 | 1 | (United Kingdom) Gary Paffett | 44 | | (Germany) DaimlerChrysler Bank AMG-Mercedes | 61 | 1 | (Germany) Audi | 111 |
| 2 | 1 | (Sweden) Mattias Ekström | 41 | | (Germany) Audi Sport Team Abt Sportsline | 48 | 1 | (Germany) Mercedes-Benz | 105 |
| 3 | | (Denmark) Tom Kristensen | 28 | | (Germany) Audi Sport Team Abt | 38 | | (Germany) Opel | 18 |
| 4 | | (Finland) Mika Häkkinen | 17 | | (Germany) Vodafone/Sport Edition AMG-Mercedes | 28 | | | |
| 5 | | (France) Jean Alesi | 17 | 1 | (Germany) Audi Sport Team Joest Racing | 21 | | | |

- Note: Only the top five positions are included for three sets of standings.

| Previous race: 2005 Oschersleben DTM round | Deutsche Tourenwagen Masters; 2005 season | Next race: 2005 Nürburgring DTM round |
