= 2005 Zandvoort DTM round =

8th round of the 2005 Deutsche Tourenwagen Masters

(Netherlands) 2005 DTM Zandvoort round
Round details
Round 8 of 11 rounds in the
2005 Deutsche Tourenwagen Masters season
← Previous race	Next race →
- Location: Circuit Zandvoort, Zandvoort, Netherlands
- Course: Permanent racing facility 4.307 km (2.676 mi)

Deutsche Tourenwagen Masters

Race
- Date: 28 August 2005
- Laps: 43

Pole position
Driver	(Germany) Bernd Schneider	Vodafone AMG-Mercedes
- Time: 1:32.730

Podium
First	(United Kingdom) Gary Paffett	DaimlerChrysler Bank AMG-Mercedes
Second	(Sweden) Mattias Ekström	Audi Sport Team Abt Sportsline
Third	(Germany) Heinz-Harald Frentzen	Stern Team OPC

Fastest lap
Driver	(United Kingdom) Gary Paffett	DaimlerChrysler Bank AMG-Mercedes
- Time: 1:34.785 (on lap 9)

The 2005 Zandvoort DTM round was a motor racing event for the Deutsche Tourenwagen Masters held between 26–28 August 2005. The event, part of the 19th season of the DTM, was held at the Circuit Zandvoort in Netherlands.

== Results ==
=== Qualifying ===
Pos.	No.	Driver	Team	Car	Q	SP	Grid
1	7	(Germany) Bernd Schneider	Vodafone AMG-Mercedes	AMG-Mercedes C-Klasse 2005	1:33.220	1:32.730	1
2	9	(Switzerland) Marcel Fässler	GMAC Team OPC	Opel Vectra GTS V8 2005	1:33.127	1:32.954	2
3	10	(Germany) Heinz-Harald Frentzen	Stern Team OPC	Opel Vectra GTS V8 2005	1:33.194	1:33.009	3
4	3	(United Kingdom) Gary Paffett	DaimlerChrysler Bank AMG-Mercedes	AMG-Mercedes C-Klasse 2005	1:33.038	1:33.205	4
5	1	(Sweden) Mattias Ekström	Audi Sport Team Abt Sportsline	Audi A4 DTM 2005	1:33.300	1:33.277	5
6	21	(United Kingdom) Jamie Green	Salzgitter AMG-Mercedes	AMG-Mercedes C-Klasse 2004	1:33.252	1:33.295	6
7	6	(United Kingdom) Allan McNish	Audi Sport Team Abt	Audi A4 DTM 2005	1:33.483	1:33.404	7
8	14	(Germany) Christian Abt	Audi Sport Team Joest Racing	Audi A4 DTM 2004	1:33.456	1:33.636	8
9	19	(Germany) Frank Stippler	Audi Sport Team Joest	Audi A4 DTM 2004	1:33.492	1:34.132	9
10	5	(Denmark) Tom Kristensen	Audi Sport Team Abt	Audi A4 DTM 2005	1:32.968	1:34.244	10
11	8	(Finland) Mika Häkkinen	Sport Edition AMG-Mercedes	AMG-Mercedes C-Klasse 2005	1:33.595	—N/a	11
12	12	(Germany) Manuel Reuter	Team OPC	Opel Vectra GTS V8 2005	1:33.700	—N/a	12
13	11	(France) Laurent Aïello	Team OPC	Opel Vectra GTS V8 2005	1:33.724	—N/a	13
14	20	(Canada) Bruno Spengler	Junge Gebrauchte von Mercedes AMG-Mercedes	AMG-Mercedes C-Klasse 2004	1:33.788	—N/a	14
15	2	(Germany) Martin Tomczyk	Audi Sport Team Abt Sportsline	Audi A4 DTM 2005	1:33.874	—N/a	15
16	18	(Italy) Rinaldo Capello	Audi Sport Team Joest	Audi A4 DTM 2004	1:34.145	—N/a	16
17	17	(Greece) Alexandros Margaritis	Mücke Motorsport	AMG-Mercedes C-Klasse 2004	1:34.170	—N/a	17
18	15	(Germany) Pierre Kaffer	Audi Sport Team Joest Racing	Audi A4 DTM 2004	1:34.180	—N/a	18
19	4	(France) Jean Alesi	AMG-Mercedes	AMG-Mercedes C-Klasse 2005	1:34.305	—N/a	19
20	16	(Germany) Stefan Mücke	Mücke Motorsport	AMG-Mercedes C-Klasse 2004	1:34.568	—N/a	20

=== Race ===
Pos.	No.	Driver	Team	Car	Laps	Time / Retired	Grid	Pts.
1	3	(United Kingdom) Gary Paffett	DaimlerChrysler Bank AMG-Mercedes	AMG-Mercedes C-Klasse 2005	38	1:01:59.421	4	10
2	1	(Sweden) Mattias Ekström	Audi Sport Team Abt Sportsline	Audi A4 DTM 2005	38	+12.015	5	8
3	10	(Germany) Heinz-Harald Frentzen	Stern Team OPC	Opel Vectra GTS V8 2005	38	+16.732	3	6
4	5	(Denmark) Tom Kristensen	Audi Sport Team Abt	Audi A4 DTM 2005	38	+20.042	10	5
5	9	(Switzerland) Marcel Fässler	GMAC Team OPC	Opel Vectra GTS V8 2005	38	+20.873	2	4
6	2	(Germany) Martin Tomczyk	Audi Sport Team Abt Sportsline	Audi A4 DTM 2005	38	+21.120	15	3
7	21	(United Kingdom) Jamie Green	Salzgitter AMG-Mercedes	AMG-Mercedes C-Klasse 2004	38	+23.436	6	2
8	7	(Germany) Bernd Schneider	Vodafone AMG-Mercedes	AMG-Mercedes C-Klasse 2005	38	+30.921	1	1
9	20	(Canada) Bruno Spengler	Junge Gebrauchte von Mercedes AMG-Mercedes	AMG-Mercedes C-Klasse 2004	38	+36.488	14	
10	14	(Germany) Christian Abt	Audi Sport Team Joest Racing	Audi A4 DTM 2004	38	+37.719	8	
11	15	(Germany) Pierre Kaffer	Audi Sport Team Joest Racing	Audi A4 DTM 2004	38	+39.113	18	
12	8	(Finland) Mika Häkkinen	Sport Edition AMG-Mercedes	AMG-Mercedes C-Klasse 2005	38	+40.123	11	
13	17	(Greece) Alexandros Margaritis	Mücke Motorsport	AMG-Mercedes C-Klasse 2004	38	+48.372	17	
14	11	(France) Laurent Aïello	Team OPC	Opel Vectra GTS V8 2005	38	+51.535	13	
15	6	(United Kingdom) Allan McNish	Audi Sport Team Abt	Audi A4 DTM 2005	32	+6 laps	7	
Ret	12	(Germany) Manuel Reuter	Team OPC	Opel Vectra GTS V8 2005	27	Collision damage	12	
Ret	18	(Italy) Rinaldo Capello	Audi Sport Team Joest	Audi A4 DTM 2004	18	Collision	16	
Ret	16	(Germany) Stefan Mücke	Mücke Motorsport	AMG-Mercedes C-Klasse 2004	18	Retired	20	
Ret	19	(Germany) Frank Stippler	Audi Sport Team Joest	Audi A4 DTM 2004	13	Collision damage	9	
Ret	4	(France) Jean Alesi	AMG-Mercedes	AMG-Mercedes C-Klasse 2005	2	Puncture	19	
Fastest lap: Gary Paffett - 1:34.785 (lap 9)

== Championship standings after the race ==
Pos.	Drivers' championship			Teams' championship			Manufacturers' championship		
Pos.	Move	Driver	Points	Move	Team	Points	Move	Manufacturer	Points
1	1	(United Kingdom) Gary Paffett	60		(Germany) DaimlerChrysler Bank AMG-Mercedes	79		(Germany) Audi	148
2	1	(Sweden) Mattias Ekström	59		(Germany) Audi Sport Team Abt Sportsline	69		(Germany) Mercedes-Benz	136
3		(Denmark) Tom Kristensen	41		(Germany) Audi Sport Team Abt	54		(Germany) Opel	28
4		(Finland) Mika Häkkinen	22		(Germany) Vodafone/Sport Edition AMG-Mercedes	38			
5		(France) Jean Alesi	19	1	(Germany) GMAC/Stern Team OPC	24			

- Note: Only the top five positions are included for three sets of standings.

Previous race: 2005 Nürburgring DTM round	Deutsche Tourenwagen Masters; 2005 season	Next race: 2005 2nd Lausitzring DTM round
