= 2005 Istanbul DTM round =

11th round of the 2005 Deutsche Tourenwagen Masters

(Turkey) 2005 DTM Istanbul Park round
Round details
Round 10 of 11 rounds in the
2005 Deutsche Tourenwagen Masters season
← Previous race	Next race →
- Location: Istanbul Park, Istanbul, Turkey
- Course: Permanent racing facility 5.338 km (3.317 mi)

Deutsche Tourenwagen Masters

Race
- Date: 2 October 2005
- Laps: 32

Pole position
Driver	(United Kingdom) Gary Paffett	DaimlerChrysler Bank AMG-Mercedes
- Time: 1:47.101

Podium
First	(United Kingdom) Gary Paffett	DaimlerChrysler Bank AMG-Mercedes
Second	(Finland) Mika Häkkinen	Sport Edition AMG-Mercedes
Third	(Germany) Bernd Schneider	Vodafone AMG-Mercedes

Fastest lap
Driver	(Finland) Mika Häkkinen	Sport Edition AMG-Mercedes
- Time: 2:00.130 (on lap 6)

The 2005 Istanbul DTM round was a motor racing event for the Deutsche Tourenwagen Masters held between 30 September – 2 October 2005. The event, part of the 19th season of the DTM, was held at the Istanbul Park in Turkey.

== Results ==
=== Qualifying ===
Pos.	No.	Driver	Team	Car	Q	SP	Grid
1	3	(United Kingdom) Gary Paffett	DaimlerChrysler Bank AMG-Mercedes	AMG-Mercedes C-Klasse 2005	1:47.337	1:47.101	1
2	7	(Germany) Bernd Schneider	Vodafone AMG-Mercedes	AMG-Mercedes C-Klasse 2005	1:47.493	1:47.156	2
3	20	(Canada) Bruno Spengler	Junge Gebrauchte von Mercedes AMG-Mercedes	AMG-Mercedes C-Klasse 2004	1:47.208	1:47.280	3
4	21	(United Kingdom) Jamie Green	Salzgitter AMG-Mercedes	AMG-Mercedes C-Klasse 2004	1:47.564	1:47.330	4
5	1	(Sweden) Mattias Ekström	Audi Sport Team Abt Sportsline	Audi A4 DTM 2005	1:47.467	1:47.553	5
6	12	(Germany) Manuel Reuter	Team OPC	Opel Vectra GTS V8 2005	1:47.743	1:47.604	6
7	8	(Finland) Mika Häkkinen	Sport Edition AMG-Mercedes	AMG-Mercedes C-Klasse 2005	1:47.431	1:47.641	7
8	4	(France) Jean Alesi	AMG-Mercedes	AMG-Mercedes C-Klasse 2005	1:47.769	1:47.654	8
9	9	(Switzerland) Marcel Fässler	GMAC Team OPC	Opel Vectra GTS V8 2005	1:47.530	1:47.936	9
10	5	(Denmark) Tom Kristensen	Audi Sport Team Abt	Audi A4 DTM 2005	1:47.411	1:48.070	10
11	11	(France) Laurent Aïello	Team OPC	Opel Vectra GTS V8 2005	1:47.814	—N/a	11
12	10	(Germany) Heinz-Harald Frentzen	Stern Team OPC	Opel Vectra GTS V8 2005	1:47.830	—N/a	12
13	2	(Germany) Martin Tomczyk	Audi Sport Team Abt Sportsline	Audi A4 DTM 2005	1:47.848	—N/a	13
14	19	(Germany) Frank Stippler	Audi Sport Team Joest	Audi A4 DTM 2004	1:48.001	—N/a	14
15	6	(United Kingdom) Allan McNish	Audi Sport Team Abt	Audi A4 DTM 2005	1:48.181	—N/a	15
16	18	(Italy) Rinaldo Capello	Audi Sport Team Joest	Audi A4 DTM 2004	1:48.186	—N/a	16
17	17	(Greece) Alexandros Margaritis	Mücke Motorsport	AMG-Mercedes C-Klasse 2004	1:48.302	—N/a	17
18	14	(Germany) Christian Abt	Audi Sport Team Joest Racing	Audi A4 DTM 2004	1:48.341	—N/a	18
19	16	(Germany) Stefan Mücke	Mücke Motorsport	AMG-Mercedes C-Klasse 2004	1:48.377	—N/a	19
20	15	(Germany) Pierre Kaffer	Audi Sport Team Joest Racing	Audi A4 DTM 2004	1:48.392	—N/a	20

=== Race ===
Pos.	No.	Driver	Team	Car	Laps	Time / Retired	Grid	Pts.
1	3	(United Kingdom) Gary Paffett	DaimlerChrysler Bank AMG-Mercedes	AMG-Mercedes C-Klasse 2005	32	1:05:27.828	1	10
2	8	(Finland) Mika Häkkinen	Sport Edition AMG-Mercedes	AMG-Mercedes C-Klasse 2005	32	+3.222	7	8
3	7	(Germany) Bernd Schneider	Vodafone AMG-Mercedes	AMG-Mercedes C-Klasse 2005	32	+3.551	2	6
4	21	(United Kingdom) Jamie Green	Salzgitter AMG-Mercedes	AMG-Mercedes C-Klasse 2004	32	+3.994	4	5
5	5	(Denmark) Tom Kristensen	Audi Sport Team Abt	Audi A4 DTM 2005	32	+30.889	10	4
6	11	(France) Laurent Aïello	Team OPC	Opel Vectra GTS V8 2005	32	+33.142	11	3
7	4	(France) Jean Alesi	AMG-Mercedes	AMG-Mercedes C-Klasse 2005	32	+36.534	8	2
8	20	(Canada) Bruno Spengler	Junge Gebrauchte von Mercedes AMG-Mercedes	AMG-Mercedes C-Klasse 2004	32	+37.541	11	1
9	16	(Germany) Stefan Mücke	Mücke Motorsport	AMG-Mercedes C-Klasse 2004	32	+45.625	19	
10	9	(Switzerland) Marcel Fässler	GMAC Team OPC	Opel Vectra GTS V8 2005	32	+52.481	9	
11	17	(Greece) Alexandros Margaritis	Mücke Motorsport	AMG-Mercedes C-Klasse 2004	32	+54.606	17	
12	1	(Sweden) Mattias Ekström	Audi Sport Team Abt Sportsline	Audi A4 DTM 2005	32	+58.189	5	
13	19	(Germany) Frank Stippler	Audi Sport Team Joest	Audi A4 DTM 2004	32	+1:08.087	14	
14	12	(Germany) Manuel Reuter	Team OPC	Opel Vectra GTS V8 2005	32	+1:08.697	6	
15	6	(United Kingdom) Allan McNish	Audi Sport Team Abt	Audi A4 DTM 2005	32	+1:12.520	15	
16	2	(Germany) Martin Tomczyk	Audi Sport Team Abt Sportsline	Audi A4 DTM 2005	31	+1 lap	13	
Ret	15	(Germany) Pierre Kaffer	Audi Sport Team Joest Racing	Audi A4 DTM 2004	22	Retired	20	
Ret	18	(Italy) Rinaldo Capello	Audi Sport Team Joest	Audi A4 DTM 2004	11	Retired	16	
Ret	10	(Germany) Heinz-Harald Frentzen	Stern Team OPC	Opel Vectra GTS V8 2005	5	Collision	12	
Ret	14	(Germany) Christian Abt	Audi Sport Team Joest Racing	Audi A4 DTM 2004	5	Collision	18	
Fastest lap: Mika Häkkinen - 2:00.130 (lap 6)

== Championship standings after the race ==
- **Bold text** indicates 2005 champions.

Pos.	Drivers' championship			Teams' championship			Manufacturers' championship		
Pos.	Move	Driver	Points	Move	Team	Points	Move	Manufacturer	Points
1	1	(United Kingdom) Gary Paffett	78		(Germany) **DaimlerChrysler Bank AMG-Mercedes**	100	1	(Germany) Mercedes-Benz	180
2	1	(Sweden) Mattias Ekström	69		(Germany) Audi Sport Team Abt Sportsline	79	1	(Germany) Audi	168
3		(Denmark) Tom Kristensen	51		(Germany) Audi Sport Team Abt	64		(Germany) Opel	42
4		(Finland) Mika Häkkinen	30		(Germany) Vodafone/Sport Edition AMG-Mercedes	52			
5		(France) Jean Alesi	22		(Germany) GMAC/Stern Team OPC	26			

- Note: Only the top five positions are included for three sets of standings.

Previous race: 2005 2nd Lausitzring DTM round	Deutsche Tourenwagen Masters; 2005 season	Next race: 2005 2nd Hockenheim DTM round
