= 2005 2nd Lausitzring DTM round =

9th round of the 2005 Deutsche Tourenwagen Masters

(Germany) 2005 DTM Lausitzring round
Round details
Round 9 of 11 rounds in the
2005 Deutsche Tourenwagen Masters season
← Previous race	Next race →
- Location: Lausitzring, Klettwitz, Germany
- Course: Permanent racing facility 3.478 km (2.161 mi)

Deutsche Tourenwagen Masters

Race
- Date: 18 September 2005
- Laps: 48

Pole position
Driver	(United Kingdom) Jamie Green	Salzgitter AMG-Mercedes
- Time: 1:17.489

Podium
First	(Sweden) Mattias Ekström	Audi Sport Team Abt Sportsline
Second	(United Kingdom) Gary Paffett	DaimlerChrysler Bank AMG-Mercedes
Third	(Denmark) Tom Kristensen	Audi Sport Team Abt

Fastest lap
Driver	(United Kingdom) Gary Paffett	DaimlerChrysler Bank AMG-Mercedes
- Time: 1:17.938 (on lap 9)

The 2005 2nd Lausitzring DTM round was a motor racing event for the Deutsche Tourenwagen Masters held between 16–18 September 2005. The event, part of the 19th season of the DTM, was held at the EuroSpeedway Lausitz in Germany.

== Results ==
=== Qualifying ===
Pos.	No.	Driver	Team	Car	Q	SP	Grid
1	21	(United Kingdom) Jamie Green	Salzgitter AMG-Mercedes	AMG-Mercedes C-Klasse 2004	1:18.130	1:17.489	1
2	10	(Germany) Heinz-Harald Frentzen	Stern Team OPC	Opel Vectra GTS V8 2005	1:17.998	1:17.679	2
3	12	(Germany) Manuel Reuter	Team OPC	Opel Vectra GTS V8 2005	1:18.177	1:18.106	3
4	8	(Finland) Mika Häkkinen	Sport Edition AMG-Mercedes	AMG-Mercedes C-Klasse 2005	1:17.973	1:18.136	4
5	1	(Sweden) Mattias Ekström	Audi Sport Team Abt Sportsline	Audi A4 DTM 2005	1:17.855	1:18.142	5
6	5	(Denmark) Tom Kristensen	Audi Sport Team Abt	Audi A4 DTM 2005	1:18.152	1:18.289	6
7	3	(United Kingdom) Gary Paffett	DaimlerChrysler Bank AMG-Mercedes	AMG-Mercedes C-Klasse 2005	1:17.997	1:18.386	7
8	2	(Germany) Martin Tomczyk	Audi Sport Team Abt Sportsline	Audi A4 DTM 2005	1:18.006	1:18.481	8
9	11	(France) Laurent Aïello	Team OPC	Opel Vectra GTS V8 2005	1:17.759	1:18.867	9
10	18	(Italy) Rinaldo Capello	Audi Sport Team Joest	Audi A4 DTM 2004	1:18.110	1:19.234	10
11	4	(France) Jean Alesi	AMG-Mercedes	AMG-Mercedes C-Klasse 2005	1:18.221	—N/a	11
12	20	(Canada) Bruno Spengler	Junge Gebrauchte von Mercedes AMG-Mercedes	AMG-Mercedes C-Klasse 2004	1:18.244	—N/a	12
13	19	(Germany) Frank Stippler	Audi Sport Team Joest	Audi A4 DTM 2004	1:18.288	—N/a	13
14	9	(Switzerland) Marcel Fässler	GMAC Team OPC	Opel Vectra GTS V8 2005	1:18.307	—N/a	14
15	6	(United Kingdom) Allan McNish	Audi Sport Team Abt	Audi A4 DTM 2005	1:18.366	—N/a	15
16	7	(Germany) Bernd Schneider	Vodafone AMG-Mercedes	AMG-Mercedes C-Klasse 2005	1:18.415	—N/a	16
17	16	(Germany) Stefan Mücke	Mücke Motorsport	AMG-Mercedes C-Klasse 2004	1:18.614	—N/a	17
18	15	(Germany) Pierre Kaffer	Audi Sport Team Joest Racing	Audi A4 DTM 2004	1:18.918	—N/a	18
19	14	(Germany) Christian Abt	Audi Sport Team Joest Racing	Audi A4 DTM 2004	1:19.007	—N/a	19
20	17	(Greece) Alexandros Margaritis	Mücke Motorsport	AMG-Mercedes C-Klasse 2004	1:19.330	—N/a	20

=== Race ===
Pos.	No.	Driver	Team	Car	Laps	Time / Retired	Grid	Pts.
1	1	(Sweden) Mattias Ekström	Audi Sport Team Abt Sportsline	Audi A4 DTM 2005	48	1:03:44.903	5	10
2	3	(United Kingdom) Gary Paffett	DaimlerChrysler Bank AMG-Mercedes	AMG-Mercedes C-Klasse 2005	48	+0.401	7	8
3	5	(Denmark) Tom Kristensen	Audi Sport Team Abt	Audi A4 DTM 2005	48	+3.062	6	6
4	11	(France) Laurent Aïello	Team OPC	Opel Vectra GTS V8 2005	48	+4.756	9	5
5	12	(Germany) Manuel Reuter	Team OPC	Opel Vectra GTS V8 2005	48	+6.082	3	4
6	20	(Canada) Bruno Spengler	Junge Gebrauchte von Mercedes AMG-Mercedes	AMG-Mercedes C-Klasse 2004	48	+18.762	12	3
7	10	(Germany) Heinz-Harald Frentzen	Stern Team OPC	Opel Vectra GTS V8 2005	48	+21.368	2	2
8	4	(France) Jean Alesi	AMG-Mercedes	AMG-Mercedes C-Klasse 2005	48	+23.299	11	1
9	6	(United Kingdom) Allan McNish	Audi Sport Team Abt	Audi A4 DTM 2005	48	+29.766	15	
10	2	(Germany) Martin Tomczyk	Audi Sport Team Abt Sportsline	Audi A4 DTM 2005	48	+30.198	8	
11	18	(Italy) Rinaldo Capello	Audi Sport Team Joest	Audi A4 DTM 2004	48	+30.553	10	
12	8	(Finland) Mika Häkkinen	Sport Edition AMG-Mercedes	AMG-Mercedes C-Klasse 2005	48	+34.762	4	
13	19	(Germany) Frank Stippler	Audi Sport Team Joest	Audi A4 DTM 2004	48	+36.747	13	
14	17	(Greece) Alexandros Margaritis	Mücke Motorsport	AMG-Mercedes C-Klasse 2004	48	+39.608	20	
Ret	21	(United Kingdom) Jamie Green	Salzgitter AMG-Mercedes	AMG-Mercedes C-Klasse 2004	29	Brakes	1	
Ret	7	(Germany) Bernd Schneider	Vodafone AMG-Mercedes	AMG-Mercedes C-Klasse 2005	19	Puncture	16	
Ret	16	(Germany) Stefan Mücke	Mücke Motorsport	AMG-Mercedes C-Klasse 2004	15	Collision	17	
Ret	14	(Germany) Christian Abt	Audi Sport Team Joest Racing	Audi A4 DTM 2004	14	Collision	19	
Ret	15	(Germany) Pierre Kaffer	Audi Sport Team Joest Racing	Audi A4 DTM 2004	10	Collision damage	18	
Ret	9	(Switzerland) Marcel Fässler	GMAC Team OPC	Opel Vectra GTS V8 2005	0	Collision	14	
Fastest lap: Gary Paffett - 1:17.938 (lap 9)

== Championship standings after the race ==
Pos.	Drivers' championship			Teams' championship			Manufacturers' championship		
Pos.	Move	Driver	Points	Move	Team	Points	Move	Manufacturer	Points
1	1	(Sweden) Mattias Ekström	69		(Germany) DaimlerChrysler Bank AMG-Mercedes	88		(Germany) Audi	164
2	1	(United Kingdom) Gary Paffett	68		(Germany) Audi Sport Team Abt Sportsline	79		(Germany) Mercedes-Benz	148
3		(Denmark) Tom Kristensen	47		(Germany) Audi Sport Team Abt	60		(Germany) Opel	39
4		(Finland) Mika Häkkinen	22		(Germany) Vodafone/Sport Edition AMG-Mercedes	38			
5		(France) Jean Alesi	20		(Germany) GMAC/Stern Team OPC	26			

- Note: Only the top five positions are included for three sets of standings.

Previous race: 2005 Zandvoort DTM round	Deutsche Tourenwagen Masters; 2005 season	Next race: 2005 Istanbul DTM round
