= 2005 Brno DTM round =

4th round of the 2005 Deutsche Tourenwagen Masters

(Czech Republic) 2005 DTM Brno round
Round details
Round 4 of 11 rounds in the
2005 Deutsche Tourenwagen Masters season
← Previous race	Next race →
- Location: Brno Circuit, Brno, Czech Republic
- Course: Permanent racing facility 5.403 km (3.357 mi)

Deutsche Tourenwagen Masters

Race
- Date: 5 June 2005
- Laps: 30

Pole position
Driver	(United Kingdom) Gary Paffett	DaimlerChrysler Bank AMG-Mercedes
- Time: 1:52.191

Podium
First	(Sweden) Mattias Ekström	Audi Sport Team Abt Sportsline
Second	(Denmark) Tom Kristensen	Audi Sport Team Abt
Third	(Germany) Heinz-Harald Frentzen	Stern Team OPC

Fastest lap
Driver	(Germany) Martin Tomczyk	Audi Sport Team Abt Sportsline
- Time: 1:54.786 (on lap 25)

The 2005 Brno DTM round was a motor racing event for the Deutsche Tourenwagen Masters held between 3–5 June 2005. The event, part of the 19th season of the DTM, was held at the Brno Circuit in Czech Republic.

== Results ==
=== Qualifying ===
Pos.	No.	Driver	Team	Car	Q	SP	Grid
1	3	(United Kingdom) Gary Paffett	DaimlerChrysler Bank AMG-Mercedes	AMG-Mercedes C-Klasse 2005	1:52.173	1:52.191	1
2	10	(Germany) Heinz-Harald Frentzen	Stern Team OPC	Opel Vectra GTS V8 2005	1:52.356	1:52.371	2
3	5	(Denmark) Tom Kristensen	Audi Sport Team Abt	Audi A4 DTM 2005	1:52.229	1:52.442	3
4	1	(Sweden) Mattias Ekström	Audi Sport Team Abt Sportsline	Audi A4 DTM 2005	1:52.334	1:52.564	4
5	8	(Finland) Mika Häkkinen	Sport Edition AMG-Mercedes	AMG-Mercedes C-Klasse 2005	1:52.711	1:52.610	5
6	12	(Germany) Manuel Reuter	Team OPC	Opel Vectra GTS V8 2005	1:52.584	1:52.894	6
7	6	(United Kingdom) Allan McNish	Audi Sport Team Abt	Audi A4 DTM 2005	1:52.632	1:53.016	7
8	7	(Germany) Bernd Schneider	Vodafone AMG-Mercedes	AMG-Mercedes C-Klasse 2005	1:52.585	1:53.074	8
9	21	(United Kingdom) Jamie Green	Salzgitter AMG-Mercedes	AMG-Mercedes C-Klasse 2004	1:52.748	1:53.883	9
10	2	(Germany) Martin Tomczyk	Audi Sport Team Abt Sportsline	Audi A4 DTM 2005	1:52.772	1:54.748	10
11	4	(France) Jean Alesi	AMG-Mercedes	AMG-Mercedes C-Klasse 2005	1:52.868	—N/a	11
12	18	(Italy) Rinaldo Capello	Audi Sport Team Joest	Audi A4 DTM 2004	1:52.909	—N/a	12
13	14	(Germany) Christian Abt	Audi Sport Team Joest Racing	Audi A4 DTM 2004	1:52.942	—N/a	13
14	9	(Switzerland) Marcel Fässler	GMAC Team OPC	Opel Vectra GTS V8 2005	1:53.032	—N/a	14
15	15	(Germany) Pierre Kaffer	Audi Sport Team Joest Racing	Audi A4 DTM 2004	1:53.095	—N/a	15
16	19	(Germany) Frank Stippler	Audi Sport Team Joest	Audi A4 DTM 2004	1:53.208	—N/a	16
17	11	(France) Laurent Aïello	Team OPC	Opel Vectra GTS V8 2005	1:53.446	—N/a	17
18	20	(Canada) Bruno Spengler	Junge Gebrauchte von Mercedes AMG-Mercedes	AMG-Mercedes C-Klasse 2004	1:53.485	—N/a	18
19	16	(Germany) Stefan Mücke	Mücke Motorsport	AMG-Mercedes C-Klasse 2004	1:53.693	—N/a	19
20	17	(Greece) Alexandros Margaritis	Mücke Motorsport	AMG-Mercedes C-Klasse 2004	1:54.086	—N/a	20

=== Race ===
Pos.	No.	Driver	Team	Car	Laps	Time / Retired	Grid	Pts.
1	1	(Sweden) Mattias Ekström	Audi Sport Team Abt Sportsline	Audi A4 DTM 2005	30	58:52.558	4	10
2	5	(Denmark) Tom Kristensen	Audi Sport Team Abt	Audi A4 DTM 2005	30	+0.288	3	8
3	10	(Germany) Heinz-Harald Frentzen	Stern Team OPC	Opel Vectra GTS V8 2005	30	+24.694	2	6
4	3	(United Kingdom) Gary Paffett	DaimlerChrysler Bank AMG-Mercedes	AMG-Mercedes C-Klasse 2005	30	+28.503	1	5
5	21	(United Kingdom) Jamie Green	Salzgitter AMG-Mercedes	AMG-Mercedes C-Klasse 2004	30	+30.997	9	4
6	14	(Germany) Christian Abt	Audi Sport Team Joest Racing	Audi A4 DTM 2004	30	+34.555	13	3
7	6	(United Kingdom) Allan McNish	Audi Sport Team Abt	Audi A4 DTM 2005	30	+34.815	7	2
8	19	(Germany) Frank Stippler	Audi Sport Team Joest	Audi A4 DTM 2004	30	+36.102	16	1
9	4	(France) Jean Alesi	AMG-Mercedes	AMG-Mercedes C-Klasse 2005	30	+43.286	11	
10	18	(Italy) Rinaldo Capello	Audi Sport Team Joest	Audi A4 DTM 2004	30	+43.652	12	
11	20	(Canada) Bruno Spengler	Junge Gebrauchte von Mercedes AMG-Mercedes	AMG-Mercedes C-Klasse 2004	30	+55.041	18	
12	15	(Germany) Pierre Kaffer	Audi Sport Team Joest Racing	Audi A4 DTM 2004	30	+55.934	15	
13	8	(Finland) Mika Häkkinen	Sport Edition AMG-Mercedes	AMG-Mercedes C-Klasse 2005	30	+1:10.527	5	
14	2	(Germany) Martin Tomczyk	Audi Sport Team Abt Sportsline	Audi A4 DTM 2005	30	+1:36.170	10	
15	9	(Switzerland) Marcel Fässler	GMAC Team OPC	Opel Vectra GTS V8 2005	30	+1:37.321	14	
16	11	(France) Laurent Aïello	Team OPC	Opel Vectra GTS V8 2005	29	+1 lap	17	
17	17	(Greece) Alexandros Margaritis	Mücke Motorsport	AMG-Mercedes C-Klasse 2004	27	+3 laps	20	
Ret	12	(Germany) Manuel Reuter	Team OPC	Opel Vectra GTS V8 2005	14	Retired	6	
Ret	16	(Germany) Stefan Mücke	Mücke Motorsport	AMG-Mercedes C-Klasse 2004	9	Retired	19	
Ret	7	(Germany) Bernd Schneider	Vodafone AMG-Mercedes	AMG-Mercedes C-Klasse 2005	0	Collision	8	
Fastest lap: Martin Tomczyk - 1:54.786 (lap 25)

== Championship standings after the race ==
Pos.	Drivers' championship			Teams' championship			Manufacturers' championship		
Pos.	Move	Driver	Points	Move	Team	Points	Move	Manufacturer	Points
1	3	(Sweden) Mattias Ekström	27		(Germany) DaimlerChrysler Bank AMG-Mercedes	41		(Germany) Mercedes-Benz	74
2	1	(United Kingdom) Gary Paffett	24	1	(Germany) Audi Sport Team Abt Sportsline	30		(Germany) Audi	70
3	2	(Denmark) Tom Kristensen	22	1	(Germany) Audi Sport Team Abt	24		(Germany) Opel	12
4	2	(Finland) Mika Häkkinen	17	2	(Germany) Vodafone/Sport Edition AMG-Mercedes	23			
5	2	(France) Jean Alesi	17		(Germany) Audi Sport Team Joest Racing	12			

- Note: Only the top five positions are included for three sets of standings.

Previous race: 2005 Spa DTM round	Deutsche Tourenwagen Masters; 2005 season	Next race: 2005 Oschersleben DTM round
