= 2005 Nürburgring DTM round =

7th round of the 2005 Deutsche Tourenwagen Masters

(Germany) 2005 DTM Nürburgring round
Round details
Round 7 of 11 rounds in the
2005 Deutsche Tourenwagen Masters season
| ← Previous race | Next race → |
- Location: Nürburgring, Nürburg, Germany
- Course: Permanent racing facility 3.629 km (2.255 mi)

Deutsche Tourenwagen Masters

Race
- Date: 7 August 2005
- Laps: 43

Pole position
| Driver | (United Kingdom) Gary Paffett | DaimlerChrysler Bank AMG-Mercedes |
- Time: 1:23.161

Podium
| First | (Sweden) Mattias Ekström | Audi Sport Team Abt Sportsline |
| Second | (Denmark) Tom Kristensen | Audi Sport Team Abt |
| Third | (United Kingdom) Gary Paffett | DaimlerChrysler Bank AMG-Mercedes |

Fastest lap
| Driver | (United Kingdom) Gary Paffett | DaimlerChrysler Bank AMG-Mercedes |
- Time: 1:24.442 (on lap 15)

The 2005 Nürburgring DTM round was a motor racing event for the Deutsche Tourenwagen Masters held between 5–7 August 2005. The event, part of the 19th season of the DTM, was held at the Nürburgring in Germany.

== Results ==
=== Qualifying ===
| Pos. | No. | Driver | Team | Car | Q | SP | Grid |
|---|---|---|---|---|---|---|---|
| 1 | 3 | (United Kingdom) Gary Paffett | DaimlerChrysler Bank AMG-Mercedes | AMG-Mercedes C-Klasse 2005 | 1:23.171 | 1:23.161 | 1 |
| 2 | 8 | (Finland) Mika Häkkinen | Sport Edition AMG-Mercedes | AMG-Mercedes C-Klasse 2005 | 1:23.545 | 1:23.415 | 2 |
| 3 | 1 | (Sweden) Mattias Ekström | Audi Sport Team Abt Sportsline | Audi A4 DTM 2005 | 1:22.793 | 1:23.516 | 3 |
| 4 | 7 | (Germany) Bernd Schneider | Vodafone AMG-Mercedes | AMG-Mercedes C-Klasse 2005 | 1:23.443 | 1:23.598 | 4 |
| 5 | 11 | (France) Laurent Aïello | Team OPC | Opel Vectra GTS V8 2005 | 1:23.431 | 1:23.611 | 5 |
| 6 | 5 | (Denmark) Tom Kristensen | Audi Sport Team Abt | Audi A4 DTM 2005 | 1:22.900 | 1:23.653 | 6 |
| 7 | 2 | (Germany) Martin Tomczyk | Audi Sport Team Abt Sportsline | Audi A4 DTM 2005 | 1:23.398 | 1:23.676 | 7 |
| 8 | 6 | (United Kingdom) Allan McNish | Audi Sport Team Abt | Audi A4 DTM 2005 | 1:23.299 | 1:23.789 | 8 |
| 9 | 14 | (Germany) Christian Abt | Audi Sport Team Joest Racing | Audi A4 DTM 2004 | 1:23.035 | 1:23.813 | 9 |
| 10 | 10 | (Germany) Heinz-Harald Frentzen | Stern Team OPC | Opel Vectra GTS V8 2005 | 1:23.476 | 1:23.850 | 10 |
| 11 | 21 | (United Kingdom) Jamie Green | Salzgitter AMG-Mercedes | AMG-Mercedes C-Klasse 2004 | 1:23.601 | —N/a | 11 |
| 12 | 9 | (Switzerland) Marcel Fässler | GMAC Team OPC | Opel Vectra GTS V8 2005 | 1:23.603 | —N/a | 12 |
| 13 | 4 | (France) Jean Alesi | AMG-Mercedes | AMG-Mercedes C-Klasse 2005 | 1:23.626 | —N/a | 13 |
| 14 | 19 | (Germany) Frank Stippler | Audi Sport Team Joest | Audi A4 DTM 2004 | 1:23.701 | —N/a | 14 |
| 15 | 20 | (Canada) Bruno Spengler | Junge Gebrauchte von Mercedes AMG-Mercedes | AMG-Mercedes C-Klasse 2004 | 1:23.773 | —N/a | 15 |
| 16 | 12 | (Germany) Manuel Reuter | Team OPC | Opel Vectra GTS V8 2005 | 1:23.862 | —N/a | 16 |
| 17 | 18 | (Italy) Rinaldo Capello | Audi Sport Team Joest | Audi A4 DTM 2004 | 1:24.106 | —N/a | 17 |
| 18 | 16 | (Germany) Stefan Mücke | Mücke Motorsport | AMG-Mercedes C-Klasse 2004 | 1:24.138 | —N/a | 18 |
| 19 | 15 | (Germany) Pierre Kaffer | Audi Sport Team Joest Racing | Audi A4 DTM 2004 | 1:24.190 | —N/a | 19 |
| 20 | 17 | (Greece) Alexandros Margaritis | Mücke Motorsport | AMG-Mercedes C-Klasse 2004 | 1:24.208 | —N/a | 20 |

=== Race ===
| Pos. | No. | Driver | Team | Car | Laps | Time / Retired | Grid | Pts. |
|---|---|---|---|---|---|---|---|---|
| 1 | 1 | (Sweden) Mattias Ekström | Audi Sport Team Abt Sportsline | Audi A4 DTM 2005 | 43 | 1:05:09.223 | 3 | 10 |
| 2 | 5 | (Denmark) Tom Kristensen | Audi Sport Team Abt | Audi A4 DTM 2005 | 43 | +1.088 | 6 | 8 |
| 3 | 3 | (United Kingdom) Gary Paffett | DaimlerChrysler Bank AMG-Mercedes | AMG-Mercedes C-Klasse 2005 | 43 | +4.585 | 1 | 6 |
| 4 | 8 | (Finland) Mika Häkkinen | Sport Edition AMG-Mercedes | AMG-Mercedes C-Klasse 2005 | 43 | +5.245 | 2 | 5 |
| 5 | 7 | (Germany) Bernd Schneider | Vodafone AMG-Mercedes | AMG-Mercedes C-Klasse 2005 | 43 | +10.527 | 4 | 4 |
| 6 | 6 | (United Kingdom) Allan McNish | Audi Sport Team Abt | Audi A4 DTM 2005 | 43 | +17.706 | 8 | 3 |
| 7 | 4 | (France) Jean Alesi | AMG-Mercedes | AMG-Mercedes C-Klasse 2005 | 43 | +20.934 | 13 | 2 |
| 8 | 21 | (United Kingdom) Jamie Green | Salzgitter AMG-Mercedes | AMG-Mercedes C-Klasse 2004 | 43 | +24.652 | 11 | 1 |
| 9 | 11 | (France) Laurent Aïello | Team OPC | Opel Vectra GTS V8 2005 | 43 | +27.758 | 5 | |
| 10 | 14 | (Germany) Christian Abt | Audi Sport Team Joest Racing | Audi A4 DTM 2004 | 43 | +28.673 | 9 | |
| 11 | 2 | (Germany) Martin Tomczyk | Audi Sport Team Abt Sportsline | Audi A4 DTM 2005 | 43 | +32.883 | 7 | |
| 12 | 10 | (Germany) Heinz-Harald Frentzen | Stern Team OPC | Opel Vectra GTS V8 2005 | 43 | +33.790 | 10 | |
| 13 | 9 | (Switzerland) Marcel Fässler | GMAC Team OPC | Opel Vectra GTS V8 2005 | 43 | +34.148 | 12 | |
| 14 | 19 | (Germany) Frank Stippler | Audi Sport Team Joest | Audi A4 DTM 2004 | 43 | +56.317 | 14 | |
| 15 | 20 | (Canada) Bruno Spengler | Junge Gebrauchte von Mercedes AMG-Mercedes | AMG-Mercedes C-Klasse 2004 | 43 | +57.098 | 15 | |
| 16 | 17 | (Greece) Alexandros Margaritis | Mücke Motorsport | AMG-Mercedes C-Klasse 2004 | 43 | +57.808 | 20 | |
| 17 | 16 | (Germany) Stefan Mücke | Mücke Motorsport | AMG-Mercedes C-Klasse 2004 | 43 | +1:22.357 | 18 | |
| 18 | 15 | (Germany) Pierre Kaffer | Audi Sport Team Joest Racing | Audi A4 DTM 2004 | 43 | +1:22.787 | 19 | |
| 19 | 18 | (Italy) Rinaldo Capello | Audi Sport Team Joest | Audi A4 DTM 2004 | 42 | +1 lap | 17 | |
| 20 | 12 | (Germany) Manuel Reuter | Team OPC | Opel Vectra GTS V8 2005 | 41 | +2 laps | 16 | |
Fastest lap: Gary Paffett - 1:24.442 (lap 15)

== Championship standings after the race ==
| Pos. | Drivers' championship | | | Teams' championship | | | Manufacturers' championship | | |
| Pos. | Move | Driver | Points | Move | Team | Points | Move | Manufacturer | Points |
|---|---|---|---|---|---|---|---|---|---|
| 1 | 1 | (Sweden) Mattias Ekström | 51 | | (Germany) DaimlerChrysler Bank AMG-Mercedes | 69 | | (Germany) Audi | 132 |
| 2 | 1 | (United Kingdom) Gary Paffett | 50 | | (Germany) Audi Sport Team Abt Sportsline | 58 | | (Germany) Mercedes-Benz | 123 |
| 3 | | (Denmark) Tom Kristensen | 36 | | (Germany) Audi Sport Team Abt | 49 | | (Germany) Opel | 18 |
| 4 | | (Finland) Mika Häkkinen | 22 | | (Germany) Vodafone/Sport Edition AMG-Mercedes | 37 | | | |
| 5 | | (France) Jean Alesi | 19 | | (Germany) Audi Sport Team Joest Racing | 21 | | | |

- Note: Only the top five positions are included for three sets of standings.

| Previous race: 2005 Norisring DTM round | Deutsche Tourenwagen Masters; 2005 season | Next race: 2005 Zandvoort DTM round |
