= 2005 1st Lausitzring DTM round =

2nd round of the 2005 Deutsche Tourenwagen Masters

(Germany) 2005 DTM Lausitzring round
Round details
Round 2 of 11 rounds in the
2005 Deutsche Tourenwagen Masters season
← Previous race	Next race →
- Location: Lausitzring, Klettwitz, Germany
- Course: Permanent racing facility 3.478 km (2.161 mi)

Deutsche Tourenwagen Masters

Race
- Date: 1 May 2005
- Laps: 48

Pole position
Driver	(United Kingdom) Gary Paffett	DaimlerChrysler Bank AMG-Mercedes
- Time: 1:15.808

Podium
First	(United Kingdom) Gary Paffett	DaimlerChrysler Bank AMG-Mercedes
Second	(Denmark) Tom Kristensen	Audi Sport Team Abt
Third	(Finland) Mika Häkkinen	Sport Edition AMG-Mercedes

Fastest lap
Driver	(Finland) Mika Häkkinen	Sport Edition AMG-Mercedes
- Time: 1:17.583 (on lap 40)

The 2005 Lausitzring DTM round was a motor racing event for the Deutsche Tourenwagen Masters held between 29 April – 1 May 2005. The event, part of the 19th season of the DTM, was held at the EuroSpeedway Lausitz in Germany.

== Results ==
=== Qualifying ===
Pos.	No.	Driver	Team	Car	Q	SP	Grid
1	3	(United Kingdom) Gary Paffett	DaimlerChrysler Bank AMG-Mercedes	AMG-Mercedes C-Klasse 2005	1:16.163	1:15.808	1
2	21	(United Kingdom) Jamie Green	Salzgitter AMG-Mercedes	AMG-Mercedes C-Klasse 2004	1:16.404	1:16.015	2
3	8	(Finland) Mika Häkkinen	Sport Edition AMG-Mercedes	AMG-Mercedes C-Klasse 2005	1:16.071	1:16.106	3
4	1	(Sweden) Mattias Ekström	Audi Sport Team Abt Sportsline	Audi A4 DTM 2005	1:16.064	1:16.244	4
5	7	(Germany) Bernd Schneider	Vodafone AMG-Mercedes	AMG-Mercedes C-Klasse 2005	1:16.318	1:16.358	5
6	20	(Canada) Bruno Spengler	Junge Gebrauchte von Mercedes AMG-Mercedes	AMG-Mercedes C-Klasse 2004	1:16.342	1:16.441	6
7	5	(Denmark) Tom Kristensen	Audi Sport Team Abt	Audi A4 DTM 2005	1:16.694	1:16.468	7
8	9	(Switzerland) Marcel Fässler	GMAC Team OPC	Opel Vectra GTS V8 2005	1:16.723	1:16.581	8
9	2	(Germany) Martin Tomczyk	Audi Sport Team Abt Sportsline	Audi A4 DTM 2005	1:16.764	1:16.596	9
10	16	(Germany) Stefan Mücke	Mücke Motorsport	AMG-Mercedes C-Klasse 2004	1:16.653	1:16.638	10
11	4	(France) Jean Alesi	AMG-Mercedes	AMG-Mercedes C-Klasse 2005	1:16.776	—N/a	11
12	15	(Germany) Pierre Kaffer	Audi Sport Team Joest Racing	Audi A4 DTM 2004	1:16.890	—N/a	12
13	6	(United Kingdom) Allan McNish	Audi Sport Team Abt	Audi A4 DTM 2005	1:16.901	—N/a	13
14	19	(Germany) Frank Stippler	Audi Sport Team Joest	Audi A4 DTM 2004	1:16.913	—N/a	14
15	12	(Germany) Manuel Reuter	Team OPC	Opel Vectra GTS V8 2005	1:16.945	—N/a	15
16	18	(Italy) Rinaldo Capello	Audi Sport Team Joest	Audi A4 DTM 2004	1:17.073	—N/a	16
17	10	(Germany) Heinz-Harald Frentzen	Stern Team OPC	Opel Vectra GTS V8 2005	1:17.103	—N/a	17
18	14	(Germany) Christian Abt	Audi Sport Team Joest Racing	Audi A4 DTM 2004	1:17.268	—N/a	18
19	17	(Greece) Alexandros Margaritis	Mücke Motorsport	AMG-Mercedes C-Klasse 2004	1:17.308	—N/a	19
20	11	(France) Laurent Aïello	Team OPC	Opel Vectra GTS V8 2005	1:17.457	—N/a	20

=== Race ===
Pos.	No.	Driver	Team	Car	Laps	Time / Retired	Grid	Pts.
1	3	(United Kingdom) Gary Paffett	DaimlerChrysler Bank AMG-Mercedes	AMG-Mercedes C-Klasse 2005	48	1:03:21.071	1	10
2	5	(Denmark) Tom Kristensen	Audi Sport Team Abt	Audi A4 DTM 2005	48	+4.472	7	8
3	8	(Finland) Mika Häkkinen	Sport Edition AMG-Mercedes	AMG-Mercedes C-Klasse 2005	48	+6.075	3	6
4	1	(Sweden) Mattias Ekström	Audi Sport Team Abt Sportsline	Audi A4 DTM 2005	48	+34.856	4	5
5	15	(Germany) Pierre Kaffer	Audi Sport Team Joest Racing	Audi A4 DTM 2004	48	+35.284	12	4
6	19	(Germany) Frank Stippler	Audi Sport Team Joest	Audi A4 DTM 2004	48	+42.299	14	3
7	4	(France) Jean Alesi	AMG-Mercedes	AMG-Mercedes C-Klasse 2005	48	+45.719	11	2
8	16	(Germany) Stefan Mücke	Mücke Motorsport	AMG-Mercedes C-Klasse 2004	48	+51.612	10	1
9	14	(Germany) Christian Abt	Audi Sport Team Joest Racing	Audi A4 DTM 2004	48	+51.639	18	
10	11	(France) Laurent Aïello	Team OPC	Opel Vectra GTS V8 2005	48	+54.376	20	
11	18	(Italy) Rinaldo Capello	Audi Sport Team Joest	Audi A4 DTM 2004	48	+58.430	16	
12	2	(Germany) Martin Tomczyk	Audi Sport Team Abt Sportsline	Audi A4 DTM 2005	48	+1:00.167	9	
13	9	(Switzerland) Marcel Fässler	GMAC Team OPC	Opel Vectra GTS V8 2005	48	+1:10.800	8	
14	10	(Germany) Heinz-Harald Frentzen	Stern Team OPC	Opel Vectra GTS V8 2005	48	+1:19.231	17	
15	20	(Canada) Bruno Spengler	Junge Gebrauchte von Mercedes AMG-Mercedes	AMG-Mercedes C-Klasse 2004	47	+1 lap	6	
16	12	(Germany) Manuel Reuter	Team OPC	Opel Vectra GTS V8 2005	45	+3 laps	15	
17	7	(Germany) Bernd Schneider	Vodafone AMG-Mercedes	AMG-Mercedes C-Klasse 2005	39	+9 laps	5	
Ret	6	(United Kingdom) Allan McNish	Audi Sport Team Abt	Audi A4 DTM 2005	23	Collision	13	
Ret	17	(Greece) Alexandros Margaritis	Mücke Motorsport	AMG-Mercedes C-Klasse 2004	20	Collision damage	19	
Ret	21	(United Kingdom) Jamie Green	Salzgitter AMG-Mercedes	AMG-Mercedes C-Klasse 2004	11	Collision	2	
Fastest lap: Mika Häkkinen - 1:17.583 (lap 40)

== Championship standings after the race ==
Pos.	Drivers' championship			Teams' championship			Manufacturers' championship		
Pos.	Move	Driver	Points	Move	Team	Points	Move	Manufacturer	Points
1	1	(United Kingdom) Gary Paffett	18		(Germany) DaimlerChrysler Bank AMG-Mercedes	30		(Germany) Mercedes-Benz	49
2	1	(France) Jean Alesi	12		(Germany) Vodafone/Sport Edition AMG-Mercedes	13		(Germany) Audi	29
3	2	(Sweden) Mattias Ekström	9		(Germany) Audi Sport Team Joest Racing	9		(Germany) Opel	0
4	10	(Denmark) Tom Kristensen	8		(Germany) Audi Sport Team Abt Sportsline	9			
5	3	(Finland) Mika Häkkinen	7	2	(Germany) Audi Sport Team Abt	8			

- Note: Only the top five positions are included for three sets of standings.

Previous race: 2005 1st Hockenheim DTM round	Deutsche Tourenwagen Masters; 2005 season	Next race: 2005 Spa DTM round
