= 2005 Deutsche Tourenwagen Masters =

Sports season

Champions
- Drivers' Champion: Gary Paffett
- Teams' Champion: HWA Team I

Seasons
- ← 2004 2006 →

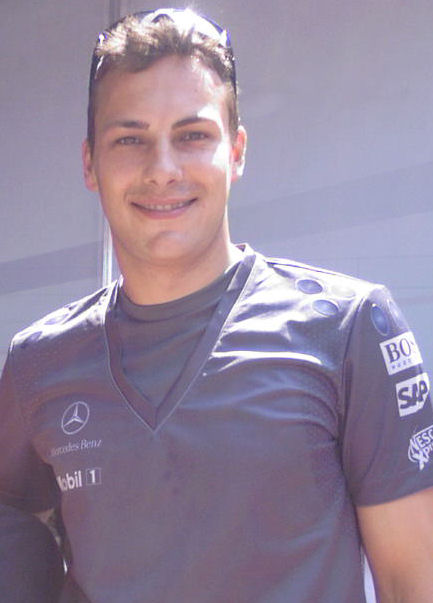
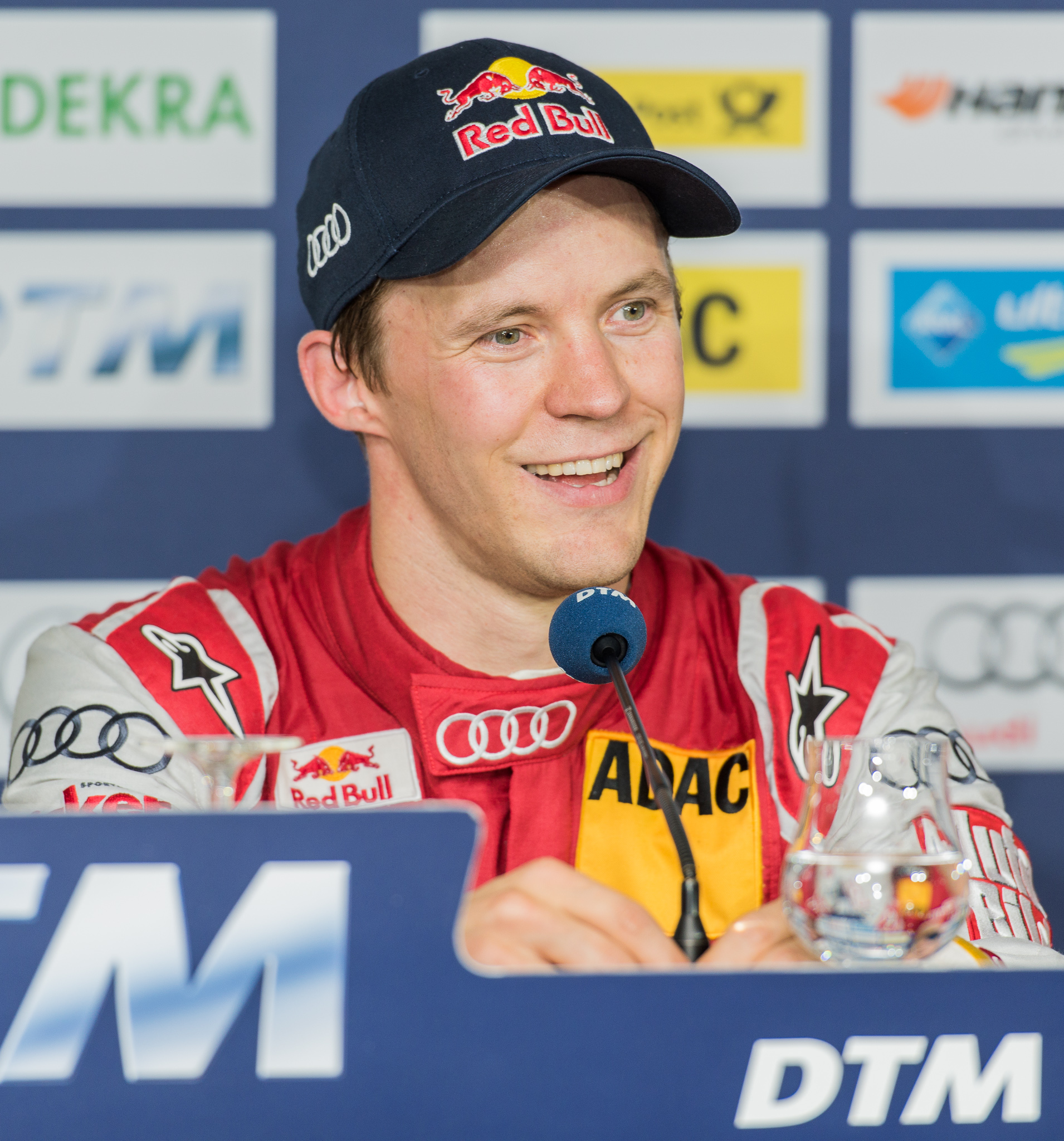
Gary Paffett won his first Deutsche Tourenwagen Masters Drivers' Championship while Mattias Ekström (right) finished second in the championship.

The 2005 Deutsche Tourenwagen Masters was the nineteenth season of the premier German touring car championship and also the sixth season under the moniker of Deutsche Tourenwagen Masters since the series' resumption in 2000. The number of race weekends were increased from 10 events in 2004 to eleven in 2005 (although 2004 had eleven events including the non-championship race at Shanghai).

Originally each track hosted one race each with the exception of Hockenheimring (two races, premier and finale), but when Avignon lost their race, Lausitzring also hosted two events.

== Changes for 2005 ==
- The cars built to 00-03 specs were banned from competition. Instead the whole field would be made up of cars built to the new 04 specs.
- Italy and Portugal lost their respective events. They were replaced by Belgium (Spa-Francorchamps) and Turkey (Istanbul Park).
- Opel scaled down from six to four cars, while Audi and Mercedes fielded eight each instead of the six they had run in 2004.
- Opel announced that they would leave the series shortly after the 2005 season ended.
- BP's German brand Aral AG would become the official fuel retailer and convenience store partner of the series starting from round 7 at Nürburgring in mid-2005, taking over Shell's fuel partner contract. The Aral Ultimate brand would provide 100 RON unleaded gasolines and displayed in the pit gantries, trackside sponsorships and all driver's race overalls on the sleeves.

== Teams and drivers ==
The following manufacturers, teams and drivers competed in the 2005 Deutsche Tourenwagen Masters. All teams competed with tyres supplied by Dunlop.

Manufacturer	Car	Team	No.	Drivers	Rounds
Audi	Audi A4 DTM 2005	Audi Sport Team Abt Sportsline	1	(Sweden) Mattias Ekström	All
Audi	Audi A4 DTM 2005	Audi Sport Team Abt Sportsline	2	(Germany) Martin Tomczyk	All
Audi	Audi A4 DTM 2005	Audi Sport Team Abt Sportsline	5	(Denmark) Tom Kristensen	All
Audi	Audi A4 DTM 2005	Audi Sport Team Abt Sportsline	6	(United Kingdom) Allan McNish	All
Audi	Audi A4 DTM 2004	Audi Sport Team Joest	14	(Germany) Christian Abt	All
Audi	Audi A4 DTM 2004	Audi Sport Team Joest	15	(Germany) Pierre Kaffer	All
Audi	Audi A4 DTM 2004	Audi Sport Team Joest	18	(Italy) Rinaldo Capello	All
Audi	Audi A4 DTM 2004	Audi Sport Team Joest	19	(Germany) Frank Stippler	All
Mercedes-Benz	AMG-Mercedes C-Klasse 2005	HWA Team	3	(United Kingdom) Gary Paffett	All
Mercedes-Benz	AMG-Mercedes C-Klasse 2005	HWA Team	4	(France) Jean Alesi	All
Mercedes-Benz	AMG-Mercedes C-Klasse 2005	HWA Team	7	(Germany) Bernd Schneider	All
Mercedes-Benz	AMG-Mercedes C-Klasse 2005	HWA Team	8	(Finland) Mika Häkkinen	All
Mercedes-Benz	AMG-Mercedes C-Klasse 2004	Mücke Motorsport	16	(Germany) Stefan Mücke	All
Mercedes-Benz	AMG-Mercedes C-Klasse 2004	Mücke Motorsport	17	(Greece) Alexandros Margaritis	All
Mercedes-Benz	AMG-Mercedes C-Klasse 2004	Persson Motorsport	20	(Canada) Bruno Spengler	All
Mercedes-Benz	AMG-Mercedes C-Klasse 2004	Persson Motorsport	21	(United Kingdom) Jamie Green	All
Opel	Opel Vectra GTS V8 2005	OPC Team Holzer	9	(Switzerland) Marcel Fässler	All
Opel	Opel Vectra GTS V8 2005	OPC Team Holzer	10	(Germany) Heinz-Harald Frentzen	All
Opel	Opel Vectra GTS V8 2005	OPC Team Phoenix	11	(France) Laurent Aïello	All
Opel	Opel Vectra GTS V8 2005	OPC Team Phoenix	12	(Germany) Manuel Reuter	All

=== Team changes ===
MG Rover announced that they would join the DTM in 2005 running a pair of Zytek prepared MG ZT’s. The project would fail to materialize due to MG Rover falling into administration.

Team Holzer (of Günther Holzer in Bobingen) and Team Phoenix both downscaled to 2 Opel’s each due to Opel’s reduced budget while Euroteam left the DTM after being part of Opel’s squad since 2000.

Team Joest expanded from two to four cars.

Mücke Motorsport replaced Team Rosberg as part of Mercedes’ DTM program.

=== Driver changes ===
Two time Formula One World Champion Mika Häkkinen joined the DTM with HWA Team.

Christijan Albers left the DTM to join Formula 1 the Minardi F1 Team.

Stefan Mücke left Persson Motorsport to join his Fathers team, Mücke Motorsport.

Mercedes promoted three Formula 3 Euro Series drivers to the DTM. 2004 Champion Jamie Green and Bruno Spengler joined Persson Motorsport while Alexandros Margaritis joined Mücke Motorsport.

Markus Winkelhock left the DTM to join the Formula Renault 3.5 Series with Draco Racing.

Jarek Janiš and Bernd Mayländer were left without drives for 2005 after Team Rosberg withdrew.

1998 Le Mans winner Allan McNish joined the DTM with Abt Sportsline.

Christian Abt switched from Abt Sportsline to Team Joest.

Audi works drivers Pierre Kaffer and Frank Stippler joined the DTM with Team Joest.

2003 and 2004 Le Mans winner Rinaldo Capello joined the DTM with Team Joest.

Frank Biela and Emanuele Pirro left the DTM to focus on Endurance racing.

Heinz-Harald Frentzen and Laurent Aïello swapped seats at Opel’s two teams.

Peter Dumbreck, Timo Scheider and Jeroen Bleekemolen were left without seats in the DTM due to Opel downscaling their program.

== Race calendar and winners ==
Round	Circuit	Date	Pole position	Fastest Lap	Winning driver	Winning team	Winning manufacturer	TV	Report
1	(Germany) Hockenheimring I	17 April	(Sweden) Mattias Ekström	(United Kingdom) Jamie Green	(France) Jean Alesi	DaimlerChrysler Bank AMG-Mercedes	(Germany) Mercedes	ARD	Report
2	(Germany) Lausitzring I	1 May	(United Kingdom) Gary Paffett	(Finland) Mika Häkkinen	(United Kingdom) Gary Paffett	DaimlerChrysler Bank AMG-Mercedes	(Germany) Mercedes	ARD	Report
3	(Belgium) Spa-Francorchamps	15 May	(Finland) Mika Häkkinen	(Finland) Mika Häkkinen	(Finland) Mika Häkkinen	Vodafone-Sport Edition AMG-Mercedes	(Germany) Mercedes	ARD	Report
4	(Czech Republic) Brno	5 June	(United Kingdom) Gary Paffett	(Germany) Martin Tomczyk	(Sweden) Mattias Ekström	Audi Sport Team Abt Sportsline	(Germany) Audi	ARD	Report
5	(Germany) Oschersleben	26 June	(Denmark) Tom Kristensen	(Sweden) Mattias Ekström	(United Kingdom) Gary Paffett	DaimlerChrysler Bank AMG-Mercedes	(Germany) Mercedes	ARD	Report
6	(Germany) Norisring	17 July	(Denmark) Tom Kristensen	(United Kingdom) Gary Paffett	(United Kingdom) Gary Paffett	DaimlerChrysler Bank AMG-Mercedes	(Germany) Mercedes	ARD	Report
7	(Germany) Nürburgring	7 August	(United Kingdom) Gary Paffett	(United Kingdom) Gary Paffett	(Sweden) Mattias Ekström	Audi Sport Team Abt Sportsline	(Germany) Audi	ARD	Report
8	(Netherlands) Zandvoort	28 August	(Germany) Bernd Schneider	(United Kingdom) Gary Paffett	(United Kingdom) Gary Paffett	DaimlerChrysler Bank AMG-Mercedes	(Germany) Mercedes	ARD	Report
9	(Germany) Lausitzring II	18 September	(United Kingdom) Jamie Green	(United Kingdom) Gary Paffett	(Sweden) Mattias Ekström	Audi Sport Team Abt Sportsline	(Germany) Audi	ARD	Report
10	(Turkey) Istanbul Park	2 October	(United Kingdom) Gary Paffett	(Finland) Mika Häkkinen	(United Kingdom) Gary Paffett	DaimlerChrysler Bank AMG-Mercedes	(Germany) Mercedes	ARD	Report
11	(Germany) Hockenheimring II	23 October	(United Kingdom) Jamie Green	(United Kingdom) Jamie Green	(Germany) Bernd Schneider	Vodafone-Sport Edition AMG-Mercedes	(Germany) Mercedes	ARD	Report

== Championship standings ==
=== Scoring system ===
Points are awarded to the top 8 classified finishers.

Position	1st	2nd	3rd	4th	5th	6th	7th	8th
Points	10	8	6	5	4	3	2	1

=== Drivers' championship ===
Pos	Driver	HOC1 (Germany)	LAU1 (Germany)	SPA (Belgium)	BRN (Czech Republic)	OSC (Germany)	NOR (Germany)	NÜR (Germany)	ZAN (Netherlands)	LAU2 (Germany)	IST (Turkey)	HOC2 (Germany)	Pts
1	(United Kingdom) Gary Paffett	2	1	8	4	1	1	3	1	2	1	3	84
2	(Sweden) Mattias Ekström	5	4	2	1	2	3	1	2	1	12	7	71
3	(Denmark) Tom Kristensen	Ret	2	3	2	5	7	2	4	3	5	4	56
4	(Germany) Bernd Schneider	3	17†	17†	Ret	4	10	5	8	Ret	3	1	32
5	(Finland) Mika Häkkinen	8	3	1	13	Ret	Ret	4	12	12	2	15	30
6	(United Kingdom) Jamie Green	6	Ret	19†	5	3	Ret	8	7	Ret	4	2	29
7	(France) Jean Alesi	1	7	4	9	13	Ret	7	Ret	8	7	13	22
8	(Germany) Heinz-Harald Frentzen	Ret	14	15	3	14	6	12	3	7	Ret	18†	17
9	(Germany) Christian Abt	4	9	10	6	12	2	10	10	Ret	Ret	14	16
10	(United Kingdom) Allan McNish	11	Ret	18†	7	6	4	6	15†	9	15	17	13
11	(France) Laurent Aïello	Ret	10	7	16	7	12†	9	14	4	6	9	12
12	(Switzerland) Marcel Fässler	9	13	5	15	8	Ret	13	5	Ret	10	6	12
13	(Germany) Martin Tomczyk	Ret	12	6	14	Ret	5	11	6	10	16†	Ret	10
14	(Germany) Frank Stippler	10	6	11	8	9	Ret	14	Ret	13	13	5	8
15	(Germany) Pierre Kaffer	13†	5	14	12	17	8	18	11	Ret	Ret	10	5
16	(Canada) Bruno Spengler	12	15†	Ret	11	16	13†	15	9	6	8	8	5
17	(Germany) Manuel Reuter	Ret	16	16†	Ret	15	9	20	Ret	5	14	12	4
18	(Germany) Stefan Mücke	7	8	12	Ret	11	Ret	17	Ret	Ret	9	11	3
19	(Greece) Alexandros Margaritis	Ret	Ret	9	17†	18	11	16	13	14	11	Ret	0
20	(Italy) Rinaldo Capello	Ret	11	13	10	10	Ret	19	Ret	11	Ret	16	0
Pos	Driver	HOC1 (Germany)	LAU1 (Germany)	SPA (Belgium)	BRN (Czech Republic)	OSC (Germany)	NOR (Germany)	NÜR (Germany)	ZAN (Netherlands)	LAU2 (Germany)	IST (Turkey)	HOC2 (Germany)	Pts

Colour	Result
Gold	Winner
Silver	Second place
Bronze	Third place
Green	Points classification
Blue	Non-points classification
Blue	Non-classified finish (NC)
Purple	Retired, not classified (Ret)
Red	Did not qualify (DNQ)
Red	Did not pre-qualify (DNPQ)
Black	Disqualified (DSQ)
White	Did not start (DNS)
White	Withdrew (WD)
White	Race cancelled (C)
Blank	Did not practice (DNP)
Blank	Did not arrive (DNA)
Blank	Excluded (EX)

- † — Driver retired, but was classified as they completed 90% of the winner's race distance.

=== Teams' championship ===
Pos.	Team	No.	HOC1 (Germany)	LAU1 (Germany)	SPA (Belgium)	BRN (Czech Republic)	OSC (Germany)	NOR (Germany)	NÜR (Germany)	ZAN (Netherlands)	LAU2 (Germany)	IST (Turkey)	HOC2 (Germany)	Points
1	DaimlerChrysler Bank AMG-Mercedes	3	2	1	8	4	1	1	3	1	2	1	3	106
1	DaimlerChrysler Bank AMG-Mercedes	4	1	7	4	9	13	Ret	7	Ret	8	7	13	106
2	Audi Sport Team Abt Sportsline	1	5	4	2	1	2	3	1	2	1	12	7	79
2	Audi Sport Team Abt Sportsline	2	Ret	12	6	14	Ret	5	11	6	10	16†	Ret	79
3	Audi Sport Team Abt	5	Ret	2	3	2	5	7	2	4	3	5	4	69
3	Audi Sport Team Abt	6	11	Ret	18†	7	6	4	6	15†	9	15	17	69
4	Vodafone-Sport Edition AMG-Mercedes	7	3	17†	17†	Ret	4	10	5	8	Ret	3	1	62
4	Vodafone-Sport Edition AMG-Mercedes	8	8	3	1	13	Ret	Ret	4	12	12	2	15	62
5	Salzgitter / Junge Gebrauchte von Mercedes	20	12	15†	Ret	11	16	13†	15	9	6	8	8	35
5	Salzgitter / Junge Gebrauchte von Mercedes	21	6	Ret	19†	5	3	Ret	8	7	Ret	4	2	35
6	GMAC Stern Team OPC	9	9	13	5	15	8	Ret	13	5	Ret	10	6	29
6	GMAC Stern Team OPC	10	Ret	14	15	3	14	6	12	3	7	Ret	18†	29
7	Audi Sport Team Joest Racing	14	4	9	10	6	12	2	10	10	Ret	Ret	14	21
7	Audi Sport Team Joest Racing	15	13†	5	14	12	17	8	18	11	Ret	Ret	10	21
8	Team OPC	11	Ret	10	7	16	7	12†	9	14	4	6	9	16
8	Team OPC	12	Ret	16	16†	Ret	15	9	20	Ret	5	14	12	16
9	Audi Sport Team Joest	18	Ret	11	13	10	10	Ret	19	Ret	11	Ret	16	8
9	Audi Sport Team Joest	19	10	6	11	8	9	Ret	14	Ret	13	13	5	8
10	Mücke Motorsport	16	7	8	12	Ret	11	Ret	17	Ret	Ret	9	11	3
10	Mücke Motorsport	17	Ret	Ret	9	17†	18	11	16	13	14	11	Ret	3
Pos.	Team	No.	HOC1 (Germany)	LAU1 (Germany)	SPA (Belgium)	BRN (Czech Republic)	OSC (Germany)	NOR (Germany)	NÜR (Germany)	ZAN (Netherlands)	LAU2 (Germany)	IST (Turkey)	HOC2 (Germany)	Points

=== Manufacturers' championship ===
Pos.	Manufacturer	HOC1 (Germany)	LAU1 (Germany)	SPA (Belgium)	BRN (Czech Republic)	OSC (Germany)	NOR (Germany)	NÜR (Germany)	ZAN (Netherlands)	LAU2 (Germany)	IST (Turkey)	HOC2 (Germany)	Points
1	Mercedes	30	19	16	9	21	10	18	13	12	32	25	205
2	Audi	9	20	17	24	15	26	21	16	16	4	11	179
3	Opel	0	0	6	6	3	3	0	10	11	3	3	45
Pos.	Manufacturer	HOC1 (Germany)	LAU1 (Germany)	SPA (Belgium)	BRN (Czech Republic)	OSC (Germany)	NOR (Germany)	NÜR (Germany)	ZAN (Netherlands)	LAU2 (Germany)	IST (Turkey)	HOC2 (Germany)	Points

== Bibliography ==
- Voigt, Thomas (November 2005). DTM Jahrbuch 2005: Das offizielle Buch der DTM (in German). Königswinter: Heel Verlag. ISBN 978-3-89880-529-2.
- Voigt, Thomas (November 2005). Tourenwagen Story 2005 (in German). Königswinter: Heel Verlag. ISBN 978-3-89880-528-5.
