= Mercedes-Benz Bank =

Universal bank

Mercedes-Benz Bank AG

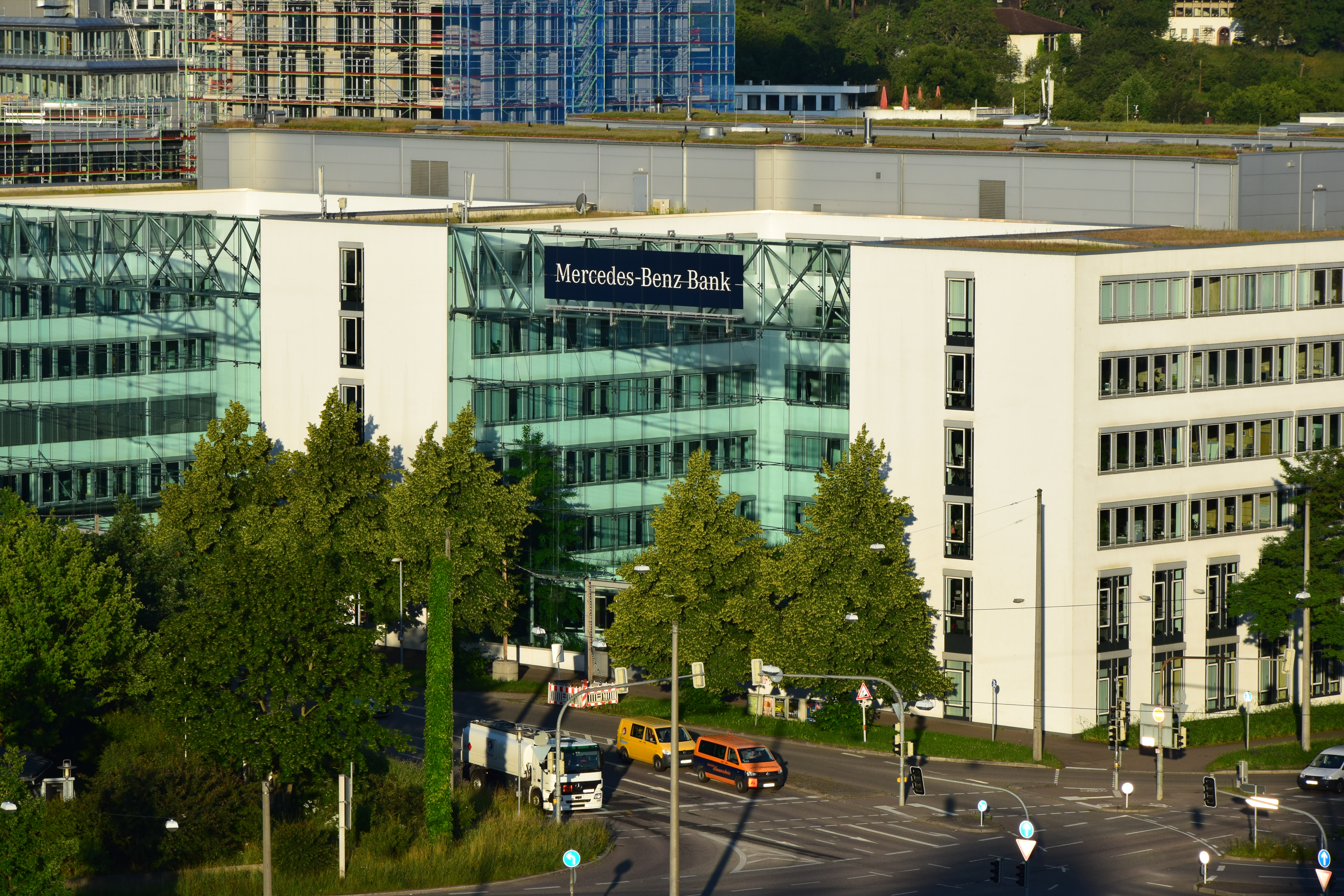
- Mercedes-Benz Bank headquarters in Stuttgart, Germany
- Company type: Aktiengesellschaft
- Industry: Finance and Insurance
- Headquarters: Stuttgart, Germany
- Products: Financial services
- Total assets: €29.2 billion (2017)
- Number of employees: >2000
- Parent: Mercedes-Benz Mobility
- Website: www.mercedes-benz-bank.de

Mercedes-Benz Bank AG is a universal bank with seat in Stuttgart. Mercedes-Benz Group founded in 1979 the Mercedes Leasing GmbH and in 1987 the Mercedes-Benz Finanz GmbH. The universal bank was founded under the name DaimlerChrysler Bank in 2001 and obtained a banking license in 2002. The name was changed to Mercedes-Benz Bank in 2008.

== History ==
The Mercedes-Benz Group AG in 1967 began with the vehicle leasing business and in 1979 founded the Mercedes Leasing GmbH, which became Mercedes-Benz Finanz GmbH in 1987. In 2000 DaimlerChrysler decided to expand the group's own bank through its service subsidiary debis to the universal direct bank DaimlerChrysler Bank. The banking license was granted in July 2002. After the DaimlerChrysler Group in 2007 separated from the Chrysler division and operated as Daimler AG, the DaimlerChrysler Bank was renamed to Mercedes-Benz Bank on January 1, 2008.

== Business divisions ==
The bank has over one million customers and a balance sheet total of 19.0 billion euros, making it one of the leading automotive banks in Germany. The offer includes leasing, financing, motor vehicle insurance and fleet management. Since July 2002, Mercedes-Benz Bank has also been offering its customers overnight money accounts, savings plans, fixed interest accounts, investment funds, certificates and credit cards (Mercedescard).

The Mercedes-Benz Bank finances or leases more than every second car and every second commercial vehicle from Daimler that is registered in Germany. Sales partners for the financial services related to the vehicle are the car dealerships of the vehicle brands of the Daimler Group. The car dealerships are looked after nationwide by the employees in two service centers - private customers since 1997 at Mercedes-Benz Banking Service GmbH in Saarbrücken, corporate clients since August 2011 at the Mercedes-Benz Bank Service Center GmbH in Berlin. The lease and financing portfolio stood at € 18.7 billion at the end of 2014. The direct banking business is managed exclusively by Mercedes-Benz Banking Service GmbH in Saarbrücken.

Through its subsidiary Daimler Fleet Management GmbH, the Mercedes-Benz Bank manages around 700 passenger car fleets with more than 280,000 contracts across all brands. Mercedes-Benz CharterWay GmbH, a joint venture of Mercedes-Benz Bank and the Mercedes-Benz sales organization Germany, operates vehicle fleet management for commercial vehicles. There are more than 9,000 companies with vans, trucks and buses under contract.

== Social commitment and sponsorship ==
Since 2003 the Mercedes-Benz Bank has a partnership with the Ethiopia relief organization Menschen für Menschen founded by Karlheinz Böhm. The bank is also the main sponsor of the Theaterhaus Stuttgart and supports volunteering.

In 2012 the Mercedes-Benz Bank became top sponsor of VfB Stuttgart.

== See also ==
- List of banks in the euro area
- List of banks in Germany
