= Opel Vectra GTS V8 DTM =

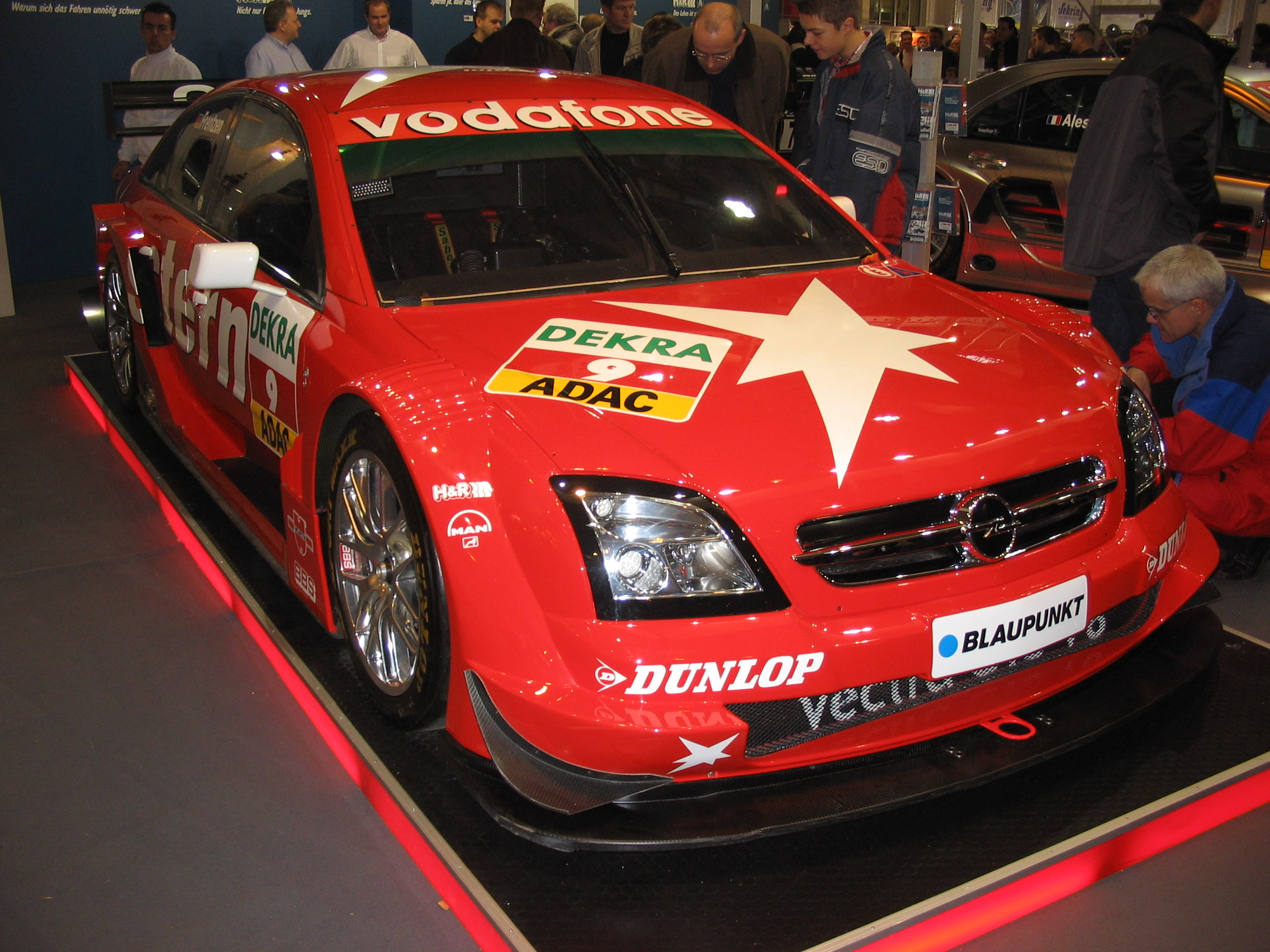
- Opel Vectra C, built to the DTM rules
- Category: Deutsche Tourenwagen Masters (touring cars)
- Constructor: Opel
- Predecessor: Opel Astra DTM

Technical specifications
- Chassis: Carbon-fibre reinforced plastic monocoque
- Suspension (front): Double wishbones front and rear, central wheel mounts, stabilisers front and rear, adjustable shock absorbers
- Suspension (rear): As front
- Length: 4,883 mm (192 in)
- Width: 1,850 mm (73 in)
- Height: 1,250 mm (49 in)
- Axle track: 1,600 mm (63 in) on front; 1,550 mm (61 in) on rear
- Wheelbase: 2,800 mm (110 in)
- Engine: Spiess-built Opel 4.0 L (244 cu in) V8 90° naturally aspirated, front engined, longitudinally mounted
- Transmission: Xtrac 6-speed sequential manual transmission
- Power: 476 hp (355 kW) @ 6,800 rpm
- Weight: 1,080 kg (2,381 lb) in 2004, later 1,050 kg (2,315 lb) in 2005 including driver
- Fuel: Shell V-Power Racing unleaded (2004); Aral Ultimate 100 RON unleaded (2005)
- Lubricants: Valvoline Racing Synthetic VR1 Motor Oil 10W-30
- Brakes: AP Racing carbon brake discs with 6-piston calipers and pads
- Tyres: Dunlop SP Sport Maxx; BBS wheels

Competition history
- Notable entrants: OPC Team Phoenix; OPC Team Holzer
- Notable drivers: (Switzerland) Marcel Fässler (France) Laurent Aïello (United Kingdom) Peter Dumbreck (Germany) Heinz-Harald Frentzen (Germany) Manuel Reuter (Germany) Timo Scheider
- Debut: 2004 DTM Hockenheimring 1 round
Races	Wins	Podiums	Poles	F/Laps
22 (Note: Includes non-championship race at Shanghai.)	0	3	0	1
- Teams' Championships: 0
- Constructors' Championships: 0
- Drivers' Championships: 0

The Opel Vectra GTS V8 DTM was a DTM touring car constructed by German car manufacturer Opel. The car's development started in mid-2002 and it was raced in the 2004 and 2005 DTM seasons with little success before the company's exit after the 2005 season. Opel withdrew from DTM due to parent company General Motors focusing on the BTCC and FIA WTCC series in the European sector as well as reducing the company's annual costs. The Vectra GTS V8 DTM replaced the Opel Astra DTM at the end of the 2003 season and was based on the production Opel Vectra C. The Opel Vectra GTS V8 DTM was involved in an accident involving Peter Dumbreck at the Zandvoort after his car lost control and rolled several times, but the driver was uninjured.

The Opel Vectra GTS V8 DTM is powered by a 4.0-litre V8 engine built by Spiess Tuning AG.
