= Salzgitter AG =

German company

- Type: Aktiengesellschaft
- Traded as: FWB: SZG; SDAX component
- Industry: Steel
- Predecessor: Reichswerke Hermann Göring
- Founded: 1858; 168 years ago
- Headquarters: Salzgitter, Lower Saxony, Germany
- Key people: Gunnar Groebler (CEO and Chairman of the executive board), Heinz-Gerhard Wente (Chairman of the supervisory board)
- Products: Steel products including tubes, steel trading, packaging and filling systems
- Revenue: €10.791 billion (2023)
- Operating income: €251.4 million (2023)
- Net income: €200.1 million (2023)
- Total assets: €8.689 billion (2023)
- Total equity: €4.835 billion (2023)
- Number of employees: 25,183 (average, 2023)
- Website: www.salzgitter-ag.de

Salzgitter AG is a German company, one of the largest steel producers in Europe with an annual output of around seven million tonnes.

With over 100 subsidiaries and associated companies, the Group is structured in four business units – Steel Production, Steel Processing, Trading and Technology – under the umbrella of a management holding company.

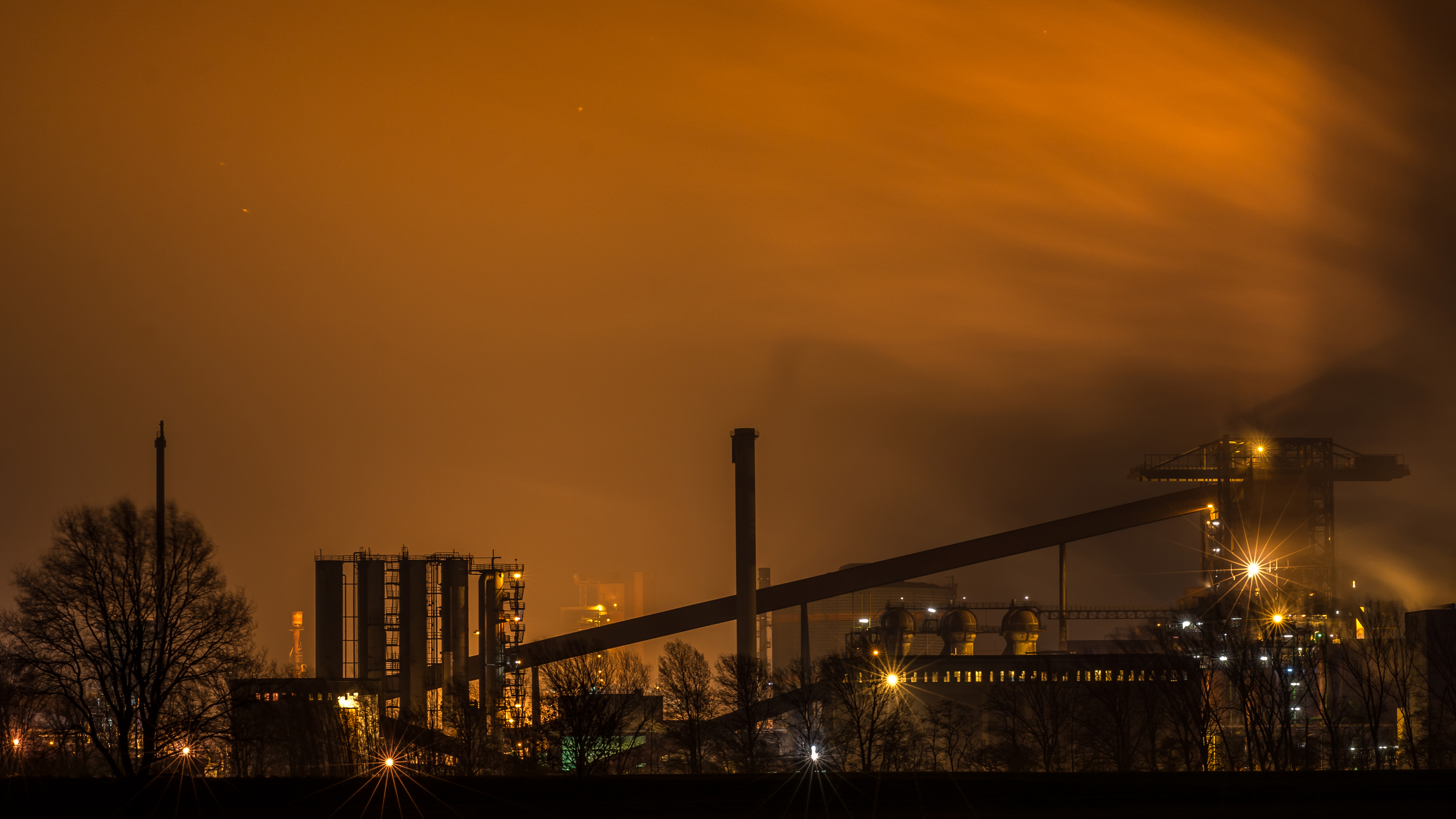
Blast furnace in Salzgitter at night

== Activities ==
The group's principal activity is to manufacture steel and associated products. The products include heavy profile steel sheets, hot-rolled wide strips and steel strips, heavy and medium weight plates, and sheet steel. The company also owns 29.99% of Aurubis which is the largest copper producer in Europe and as well the largest copper recycler worldwide.

== History ==
The history of the company goes back to 1858, when in Peine the Ilseder Hütte started. The company was incorporated with other firms in 1937 into the Reichswerke Hermann Göring, which went on to become the largest German industrial enterprise in the Third Reich along with I.G. Farben and Vereinigte Stahlwerke AG. The Reichswerke were liquidated in 1953. Its legal successor became the state owned AG für Bergbau- und Hüttenbetrieb, renamed Salzgitter AG in 1961. During the 1960s, the company was the largest state-owned corporation in the world. It went public on the German Stock Exchange in 1998.

In 1970, Salzgitter AG merged with the mining company Ilseder Hütte, which was founded in 1858 in the Hanover area in Germany to manufacture pig iron from the ore discovered in the area between Hanover and Magdeburg. The initial shareholders of Ilseder Hütte were primarily local landowners and merchants. In the 1920s the company was involved in coal mining in Westphalia to safeguard the supplies of coal required for pig iron manufacturing. The company grew through a number or mergers and acquisitions, but was hit by the economic crisis of the 1970s and became state owned through the merger with Salzgitter AG.

In 2007, Salzgitter bought Kloeckner-Werke with its filling and packaging business KHS, as part of its strategy to enter into new industrial sectors. One year later Salzgitter took over SIG Beverages from the Switzerland-based SIG packaging group, expanding its share of the plastic bottle market. This deal included the SIG subsidiaries Corpoplast, Asbofill, Plasmax and Moldtec. Salzgitter planned to commercialise the Plasmax technology to improve the barrier properties of PET bottles.

In December 2008 Salzgitter AG moved up from the MDAX index to the DAX index of top 30 German companies. It was demoted back to the MDAX in June 2010. Since 2019, Salzgitter AG is part of the small-cap SDAX index.

== Finances ==
The key trends for Salzgitter AG are, as of each financial year:

Year	2017	2018	2019	2020	2021	2022	2023	2024
Total revenue (€ mn.)	8,990	9,278	8,547	7,091	9,767	12,553	10,791	10,460
Net profit (€ mn.)	136	273	−378	−292	546	1,060	146	
Total Assets (€ mn.)	8,318	8,757	8,618	8,237	10,255	11,103	10,502	
Number of employees	25,074	25,363	25,227	24,416	24,255	24,569	25,183	24,473

== Ownership ==
The largest shareholders in December 2025 were:

Holder	Share
State of Lower Saxony	26.5%
GP Günter Papenburg AG	16,02%
Salzgitter AG	10%
Public float	47,48%

== Controversy ==
In 2019, Germany's Federal Cartel Office fined Salzgitter AG – alongside ThyssenKrupp and Voestalpine – and three individuals a combined €646 million ($712 million) for price fixing after establishing that they had agreed on certain surcharges for steel plates from 2002 to 2016.

== See also ==
- List of steel producers
