= Alexandros Margaritis =

Greek-German racing driver (born 1984)

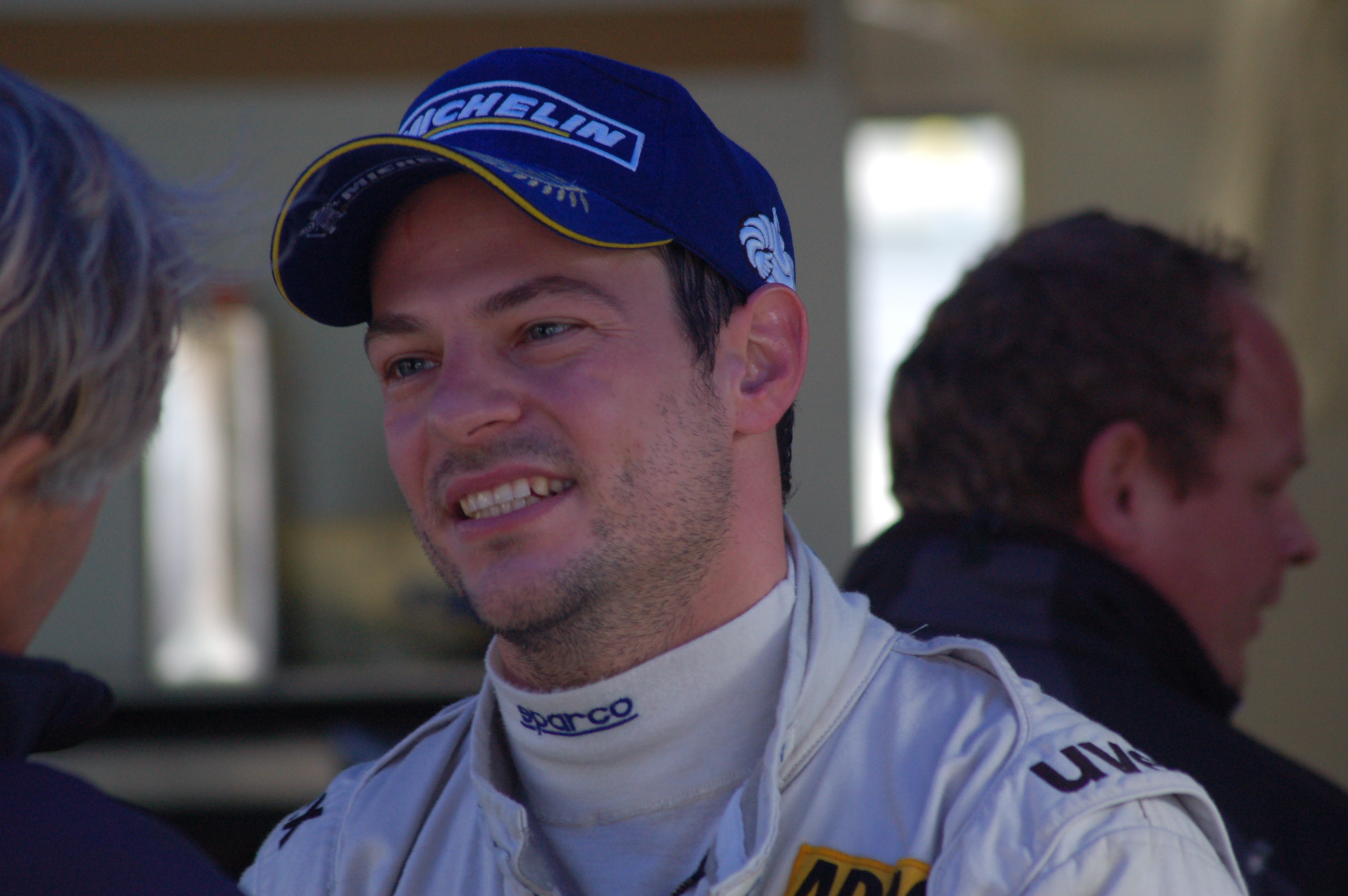
- Margaritis in 2011.
- Nationality: (Greece) Greek (Germany) German via dual nationality
- Born: 20 September 1984 (age 42) Bonn, West Germany

ADAC GT Masters
- Categorisation: FIA Gold
- Years active: 2011–12
- Teams: Team Heico; Liqui Moly Team Engstler
- Starts: 32
- Wins: 4
- Poles: 2
- Fastest laps: 1
- Best finish: 1st in 2011

Previous series
- 2010 2004, 08 2005-2007 2003-2004 2002 2002 2001-2002: FIA GT1 World Championship; FIA GT Championship; Deutsche Tourenwagen Masters; Formula 3 Euro Series; Formula Renault 2.0 Germany; Formula Renault 2000 Eurocup; Formula BMW ADAC

Championship titles
- 2011: ADAC GT Masters

Alexandros "Alex" Margaritis (Greek: Αλέξανδρος Μαργαρίτης; born 20 September 1984) is a Greek-German racing driver who is best known for competing in the German-based Deutsche Tourenwagen Masters touring car championship. Prior to that, his career had focused on formula single seater racing in Europe. Margaritis has dual nationality as a result of his place of birth and Greek parentage.

== Karting and formula racing ==
Margaritis had his first experience of karting in 1996, and in 1997, he competed in the ICA Junior class, in which he secured the championship runner-up position. He spent the next two seasons competing in the International Junior class in Germany, finishing fourth overall in 1999. In the following year, Margaritis made his single seater formula debut in the Formula BMW ADAC championship. In 2001, he achieved three podium finishes and one pole position on the way to sixth in the championship standings.

After one season in German Formula Renault, in which he finished seventh overall, Margaritis made his Formula Three debut in the first season of the new Formula 3 Euro Series. He achieved one podium finish and two pole positions during the first year and retained a place in the series in 2004.

== Touring cars ==
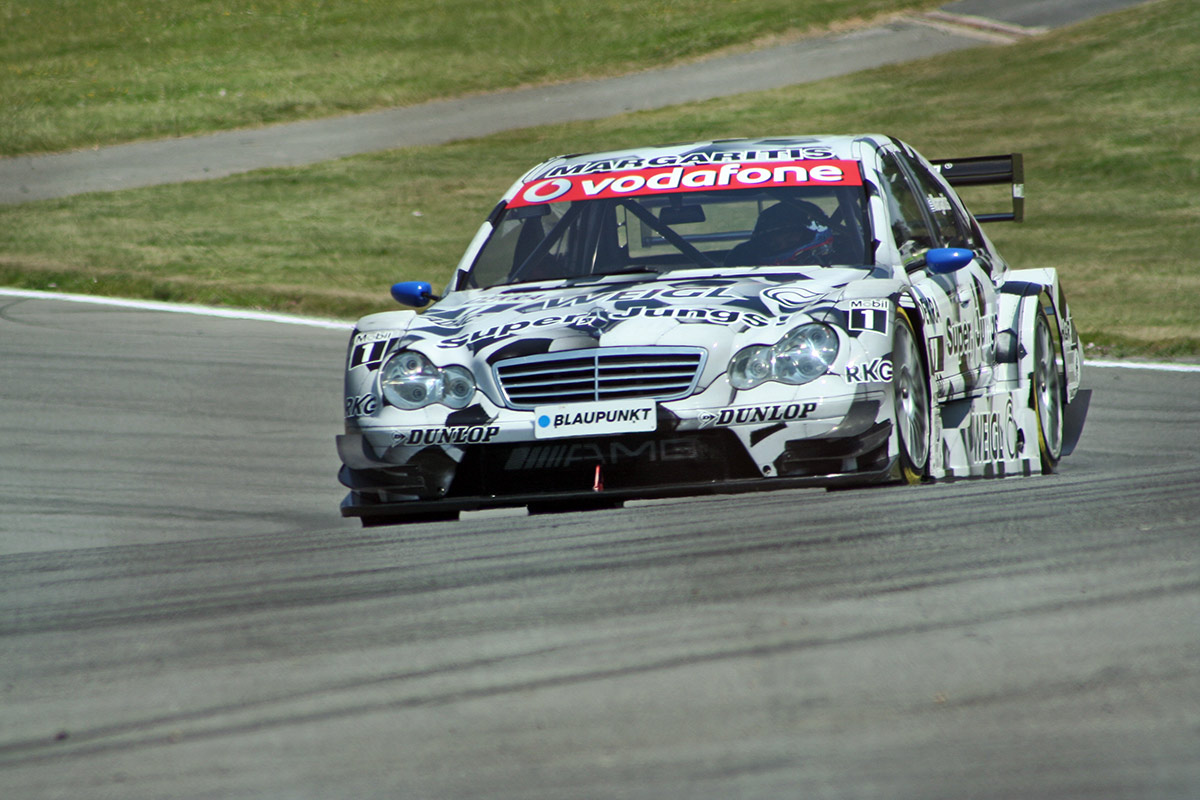
Margaritis driving for Mercedes-Benz (Persson Motorsport) in the 2006 DTM season.

In 2005, Margaritis moved from formula racing to touring cars when an opportunity arose in one of Europe's most high-profile touring car championships. He was signed by Mücke Motorsport, which was making the same transition between disciplines.

In a 2004-specification AMG Mercedes C Klasse, Margaritis did not achieve any points finishes; his best finish was ninth place at Spa-Francorchamps. He then moved to Persson Motorsport as the third driver in its 2006 line-up alongside Mathias Lauda and Jean Alesi. He was classified 11th in the standings, with a total of 11 points, and achieved a best finish of fifth position in the season's first race. Persson retained his services in 2007 alongside Paul di Resta and Gary Paffett. He finished tenth in the overall drivers standings with 16 points, achieving two fourth places.

On 27 February 2008, Margaritis announced his intention to leave the DTM and seek a position in another championship or category, citing as a primary factor the handicap of competing in year-old cars against machinery of factory specification.

== Grand Tourers ==
In 2008, Margaritis switched his focus to GT cars: He competed in the 24 Hours of Spa for Phoenix Racing. The Corvette C6.R failed to finish the race and was classified 37th.

After one season without racing in major series, Margaritis participated in the newly created FIA GT1 World Championship. He drove for Triple H Team Hegersport and Phoenix Racing. In spite of not participating in all events, he finished seventh in the overall standings.

Margaritis switched to the ADAC GT Masters in 2011. He and his partner Dino Lunardi won the driver's championship in their BMW ALPINA B6 GT3. In 2012, Margaritis switched to Team Heico to share a car with Lance David Arnold. The pairing finished 18th in their Mercedes-Benz SLS AMG GT3. Heico hired Magaritis for the 2011 and 2012 editions of the 24 Hours Nürburgring as well.

2013 saw Margaritis getting a part-time drive for H&R Spezialfedern GmbH & Co in the VLN.

== Racing record ==
=== Complete Formula 3 Euro Series results ===
(key) (Races in bold indicate pole position) (Races in italics indicate fastest lap)

Year	Entrant	Chassis	Engine	1	2	3	4	5	6	7	8	9	10	11	12	13	14	15	16	17	18	19	20	DC	Points
2003	MB Racing Performance	Dallara F303/021	Spiess-Opel	HOC; 1; 8	HOC; 2; 25	ADR; 1; 9	ADR; 2; 27	PAU; 1; 7	PAU; 2 DNS	NOR; 1; 16	NOR; 2 Ret	LMS; 1; 23	LMS; 2; 9	NÜR; 1; 10	NÜR; 2; 14	A1R; 1 DSQ	A1R; 2; 17	ZAN; 1; 14	ZAN; 2; 13	HOC; 1; 2	HOC; 2; 4	**MAG**; **1**; 26	**MAG**; **2**; 4	13th	23
2004	Opel Team KMS	Dallara F303/021	Spiess-Opel	HOC; 1; 13	HOC; 2; 8	EST; 1; 6	EST; 2; 15	ADR; 1; 6	ADR; 1; 9	PAU; 1 DSQ	PAU; 2 DSQ	NOR; 1; 16	NOR; 1; 20	MAG; 1; 4	MAG; 2 Ret									13th	18
2004	AB Racing Performance	Dallara F303/021	Spiess-Opel													NÜR; 1; 23	NÜR; 2; 13	ZAN; 1; 11	ZAN; 2; 10	BRN; 1 Ret	BRN; 2; 16	HOC; 1; 7	HOC; 2; 5	13th	18

=== Complete Deutsche Tourenwagen Masters results ===
(key) (Races in bold indicate pole position) (Races in italics indicate fastest lap)

Year	Team	Car	1	2	3	4	5	6	7	8	9	10	11	Pos	Points
2005	Mücke Motorsport	AMG-Mercedes C-Klasse 2004	HOC; Ret	LAU; Ret	SPA; 9	BRN; 17†	OSC; 18	NOR; 11	NÜR; 16	ZAN; 13	LAU; 14	IST; 11	HOC; Ret	19th	0
2006	Persson Motorsport	AMG-Mercedes C-Klasse 2005	HOC; 5	LAU; 6	OSC; 20†	BRH; 8	NOR; Ret	NÜR; 15	ZAN; Ret	CAT; 8	BUG; 7	HOC; 13†		11th	11
2007	Persson Motorsport	AMG-Mercedes C-Klasse 2006	HOC; 4	OSC; 8	LAU; Ret	BRH; 9	NOR; 7	MUG; Ret	ZAN; 8	NÜR; 13	CAT; 4	HOC; 7		10th	16

- † — Retired, but was classified as he completed 90% of the winner's race distance.

=== Complete GT1 World Championship results ===
Year	Team	Car	1	2	3	4	5	6	7	8	9	10	11	12	13	14	15	16	17	18	19	20	Pos	Points
2010	Triple H Team Hegersport	Maserati	ABU; QR; 5	ABU; CR; 9	SIL; QR; NC	SIL; CR; 6	BRN; QR; 13	BRN; CR; Ret	PRI; QR; 8	PRI; CR; 3	SPA; QR	SPA; CR											7th	84
2010	Phoenix Racing/Carsport	Corvette											NÜR; QR; 2	NÜR; CR; 3	ALG; QR; 3	ALG; CR; 3	NAV; QR; 11	NAV; CR; 8	INT; QR; 6	INT; CR; 3	SAN; QR; 18	SAN; CR; 12	7th	84

== Sources ==
- Speedsport Magazine
- Official website
- Touring Car Times

Sporting positions
Preceded by Peter Kox; Albert von Thurn und Taxis	ADAC GT Masters Champion; 2011 with: Dino Lunardi	Succeeded by Sebastian Asch; Maximilian Götz
