= ByKolles Racing =

Endurance racing team

(Austria) (Germany) ByKolles Racing
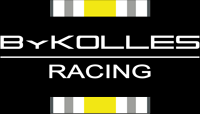
- Founded: 2000
- Founder(s): Romulus Kolles; Colin Kolles
- Former names: Kolles Racing; Kodewa GmbH & Co. KG; Vanwall Racing Team
- Base: Greding, Germany
- Team principal(s): Colin Kolles; Romulus Kolles
- Current series: FIA World Endurance Championship
- Former series: German Formula Three Championship; Formula 3 Euro Series; Deutsche Tourenwagen Masters; European Le Mans Series
- Noted drivers: (France) Tom Dillmann (Argentina) Esteban Guerrieri (Germany) Thomas Holzer (Germany) Mirco Schultis (Italy) Luca Moro (Italy) Vitantonio Liuzzi (United States) Kevin Weeda (Netherlands) Renger van der Zande (United Kingdom) James Rossiter (Canada) Jacques Villeneuve
- Website: ByKolles.com

ByKolles Racing, formerly known as Kodewa, is an Austrian-German auto racing team based in Greding, Germany. The team most recently fielded the No. 4 Vanwall Vandervell 680 in the FIA World Endurance Championship in 2023. It was founded in 2000 by Romulus Kolles and his son Colin Kolles as Kolles Racing, but has undergone several rebrands over the years. These include a sponsorship deal with Lotus Cars from 2012 to 2014, a failed takeover of Tyrrell's naming rights, and a subsequent switch to Vanwall that went to court in 2023.

== History ==
The company initially participated in German Formula 3 before moving to the F3 Euro Series from 2003 to 2005. Colin Kolles left the team to become director of the Jordan Grand Prix Formula One team at the start of the 2005 season, a position he held until 2009. With his son away, Romulus moved the team to the Deutsche Tourenwagen Masters series with Audi under the sponsorship title Futurecom TME. The Kolles team shifted their interest to sports car racing by participating in the Le Mans Series and later the Intercontinental Le Mans Cup, again with customer Audi prototypes. Kolles returned to Formula One to helm the HRT F1 team in 2010, with Kodewa's workshop in Greding serving as a base of operations for the new team before HRT's new owners chose to release Kolles from the team and move their operations to Spain in 2012.

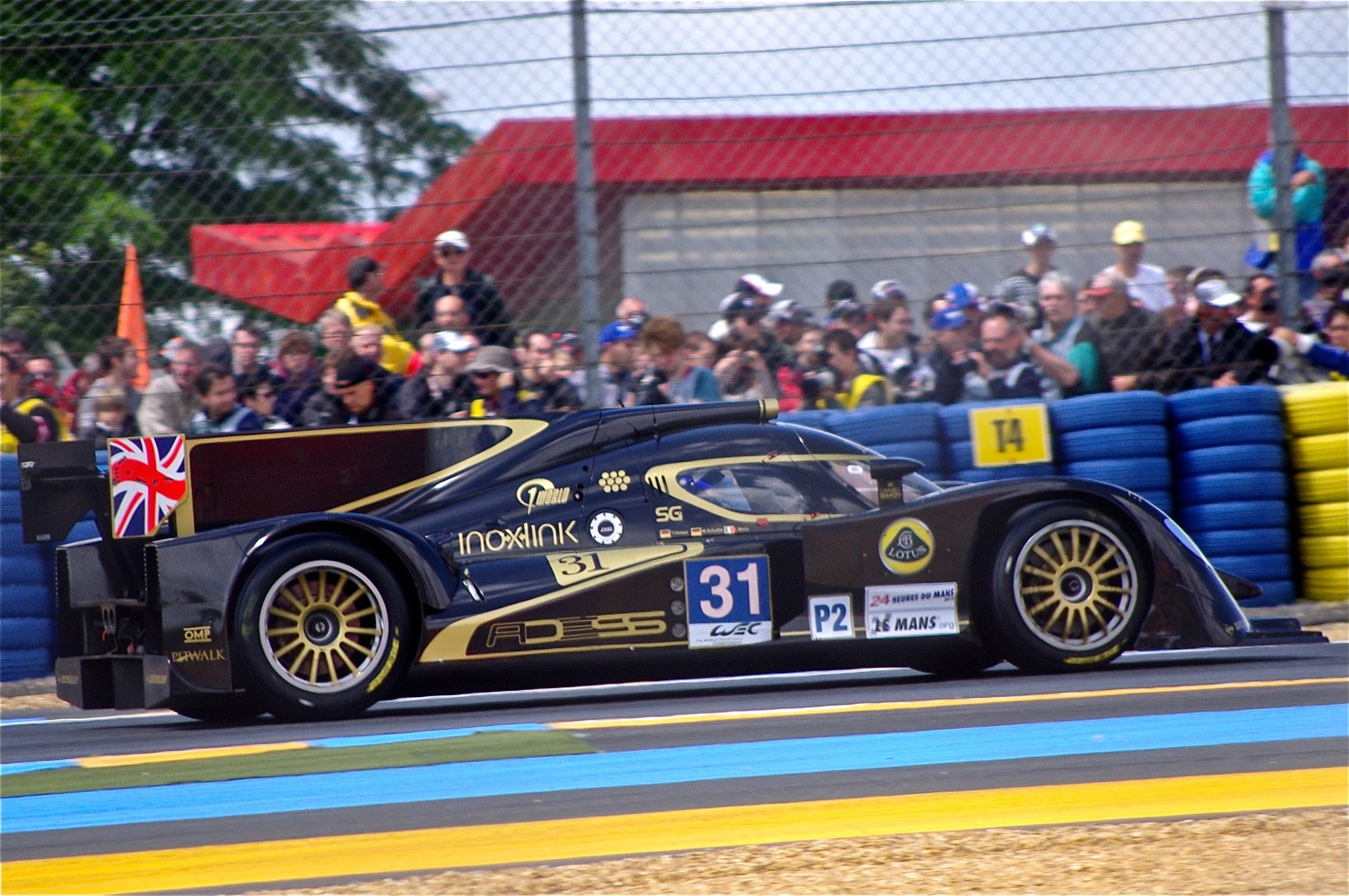
Kodewa's Lola B12/80-Lotus at the 2012 24 Hours of Le Mans

Kodewa participated in the 2013 FIA World Endurance Championship with the backing of Lotus Cars under the title Lotus LMP2. In 2014 they lost their Lotus backing and rebranded as ByKolles Racing with a new LMP1 prototype, the CLM P1/01.

In 2017 Robert Kubica was set to return to active racing again in the ByKolles car for the WEC season. In April 2018 he withdrew from the team before the first race of the 2018-2019 season.

Former Caterham F1 boss Manfredi Ravetto joined the ByKolles team in 2018.

In 2019 Kolles announced his team would not compete in the full 2019-2020 FIA World Endurance championship, but would still compete in the 2019 24 hours of Le Mans. This was announced to allow the team to contest in the then forthcoming Le Mans Hypercar class.

On March 25, 2022, Kolles announced his intention to enter the car in the 2023 FIA World Endurance Championship, stating that "If we receive a welcome, we will be ready to race."

Vanwall Racing Team Logo

On 2 April 2022 the team revealed the new Vanwall Le Mans Hypercar following a photoshoot held at a German airport some days earlier with Christophe Bouchut driving the car. The team officially rebranded to become the Vanwall Racing Team with the chassis named after 1950s Vanwall team owner Tony Vandervell.

On 11 January 2023, the entry was accepted by the Automobile Club de l'Ouest (ACO) and the team would enter the 2023 FIA World Endurance Championship in the Hypercar class with the Vanwall Vandervell 680, built to LMH specifications. The team's lineup would consist of Tom Dillmann, Jacques Villeneuve and Esteban Guerrieri, with the car being sponsored by German travel bag and luggage company Floyd GmbH.

The Vanwall name was registered as a marque by Kolles' agents PMC, in Germany, before the launch of the car. However, the use of the Vanwall marque is in question after ByKolles lost a EUIPO case brought by the continuity project Vanwall 1958 based in the UK, who also plan to build cars for competition using the Vanwall marque and history.

After a string of uncompetitive results and retirements, Villeneuve was dropped by the team for the 2023 24 Hours of Le Mans and replaced with Tristan Vautier. Villeneuve subsequently withdrew from the remainder of the season, releasing a statement questioning the team's actions and expressing his disappointment at the situation. Dillmann would leave the team following the 2023 24 Hours of Le Mans, stating that his leave was on "good terms"; he was replaced by João Paulo de Oliveira for future rounds. Ryan Briscoe would end up replacing de Oliveira for the final round of the season. In November 2023 the 2024 FIA World Endurance Championship entry list was announced and did not include the team. It was later revealed that Kolles had struck an engine deal with Pipo Moteurs, who had previously powered Glickenhaus, before the entry request was declined.

== Results ==
=== German Formula Three Championship results ===
Year	Teamname	Car	Engine	Driver	Races	Points	Pos.
2000	AIL Team Kolles Racing	Dallara F300	Mugen-Honda	(Netherlands) Elran Nijenhuis	14	18	18th
2000	AIL Team Kolles Racing	Dallara F300	Mugen-Honda	(Germany) Andreas Feichtner	4	4	24th
2000	AIL Team Kolles Racing	Dallara F300	Mugen-Honda	(Sweden) Peter Sundberg	10	4	25th
2000	AIL Team Kolles Racing	Dallara F300	Mugen-Honda	(United Kingdom) Marc Hynes	2	0	NC
2001	Team Kolles Racing	Dallara F300	Mugen-Honda	(Germany) Pierre Kaffer	20	156	4th
2001	Team Kolles Racing	Dallara F300	Mugen-Honda	(Finland) Kimmo Liimatainen	20	25	16th
2002	Team Kolles Racing	Dallara F302	Mugen-Honda	(Brazil) João Paulo de Oliveira	14	16	12th
2002	Team Kolles Racing	Dallara F302	Mugen-Honda	(Netherlands) Charles Zwolsman Jr.	10	8	15th
2002	Team Kolles Racing	Dallara F302	Mugen-Honda	(Netherlands) Ross Zwolsman	10	0	21st
2002	Team Kolles Racing	Dallara F302	Mugen-Honda	(Japan) Sakon Yamamoto	6	0	22nd
2002	Team Kolles Racing	Dallara F399	Mugen-Honda	(Italy) Stefano Proetto	14	0	30th

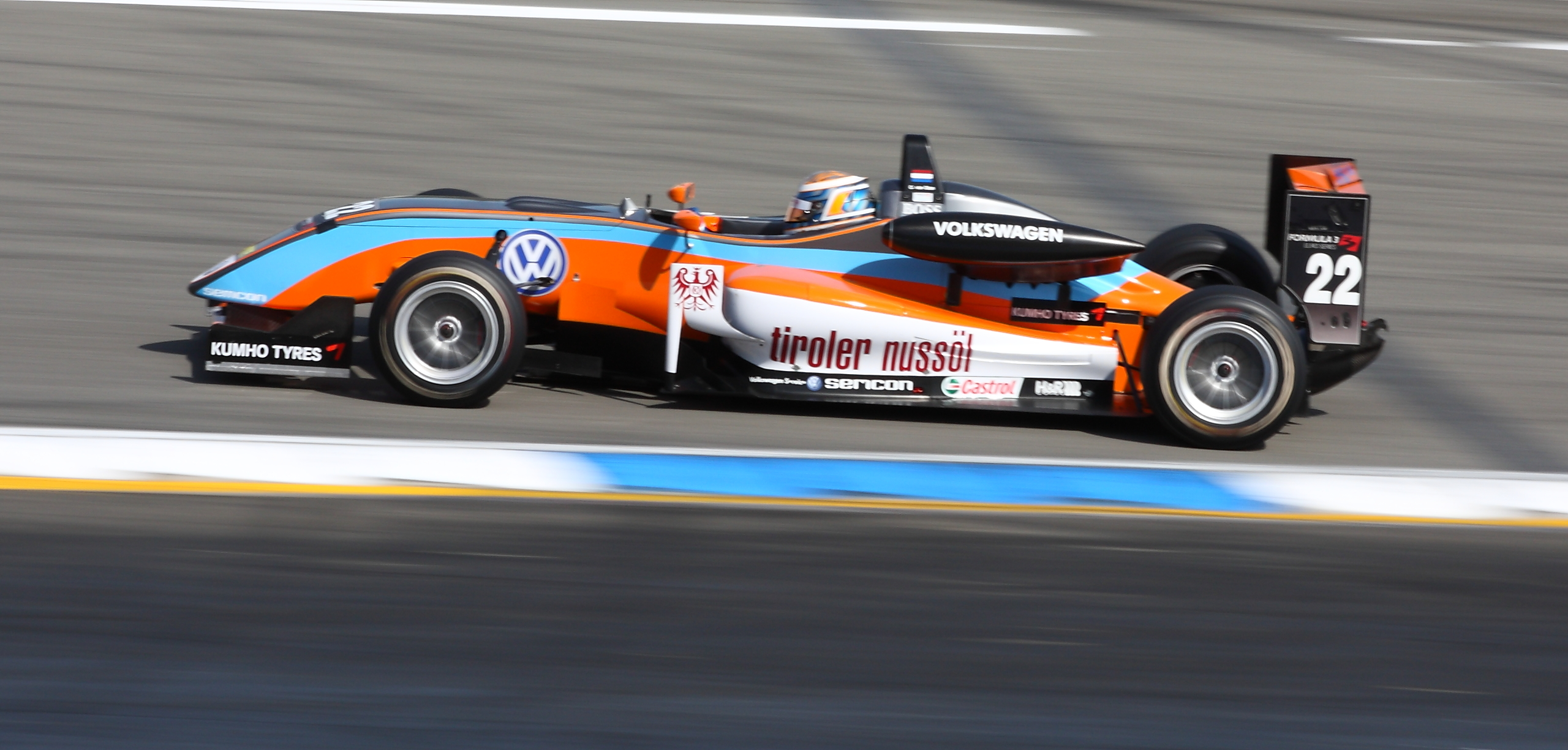
Carlo van Dam's Kolles & Heinz Union Dallara F309 at Hockenheim in 2009.

=== Formula 3 Euro Series results ===
Year	Teamname	Car	Engine	Driver	Races	Points	Pos.
2003	Kolles	Dallara F303	Mercedes	(Netherlands) Charles Zwolsman Jr.	20	7	19th
2003	Kolles	Dallara F302	Mercedes	(United Kingdom) Jamie Green	6	6	20th
2003	Kolles	Dallara F302	Mercedes	(Belgium) Jan Heylen	14	0	28th
2004	Team Kolles	Dallara F303	Mercedes	(Germany) Adrian Sutil	18	9	17th
2004	Team Kolles	Dallara F303	Mercedes	(Germany) Maximilian Götz	2	3	19th
2004	Team Kolles	Dallara F302	Mercedes	(United Kingdom) Tom Kimber-Smith	20	2	20th
2009	Kolles & Heinz Union	Dallara F309	Volkswagen	(Canada) Robert Wickens	4	0	22nd
2009	Kolles & Heinz Union	Dallara F309	Volkswagen	(Denmark) Johan Jokinen	18	0	24th
2009	Kolles & Heinz Union	Dallara F309	Volkswagen	(United Kingdom) Nick Tandy	16	0	28th
2009	Kolles & Heinz Union	Dallara F309	Volkswagen	(Netherlands) Carlo van Dam	4	0	31st
2009	Kolles & Heinz Union	Dallara F309	Volkswagen	(Italy) Edoardo Mortara	2	0	NC

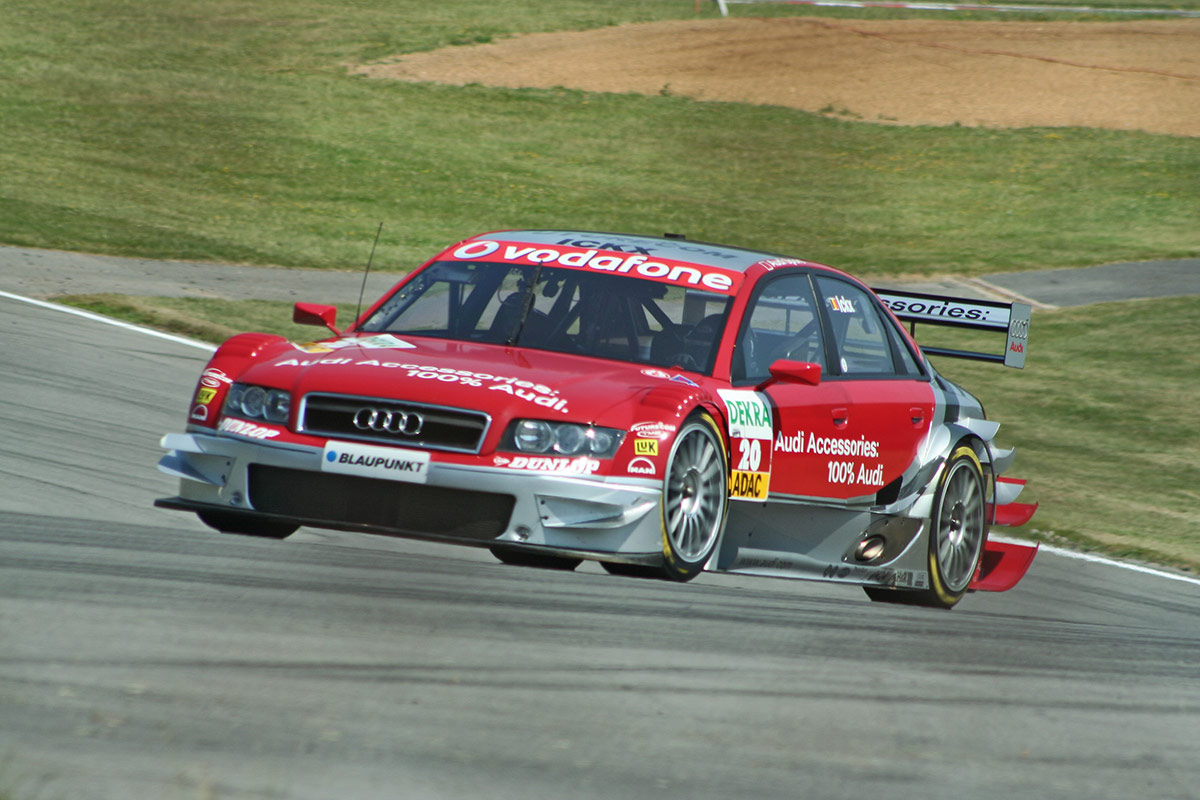
Vanina Ickx's Futurecom TME Audi at Brands Hatch in 2006.

=== Deutsche Tourenwagen Masters results ===
Year	Teamname	Car	Driver	Races	Points	Pos.
2006	Futurecom TME	Audi A4 DTM 2004	(Belgium) Vanina Ickx	10	0	19th
2006	Futurecom TME	Audi A4 DTM 2004	(Netherlands) Jeroen Bleekemolen	2	0	20th
2006	Futurecom TME	Audi A4 DTM 2004	(Netherlands) Olivier Tielemans	3	0	21st
2006	Futurecom TME	Audi A4 DTM 2004	(Sweden) Thed Björk	2	0	22nd
2006	Futurecom TME	Audi A4 DTM 2004	(Denmark) Nicolas Kiesa	3	0	23rd
2007	Futurecom TME	Audi A4 DTM 2005	(United Kingdom) Adam Carroll	5	0	18th
2007	Futurecom TME	Audi A4 DTM 2005	(Germany) Markus Winkelhock	5	0	19th
2007	Futurecom TME	Audi A4 DTM 2005	(Belgium) Vanina Ickx	10	0	21st
2008	Futurecom TME	Audi A4 DTM 2006	(Netherlands) Christijan Albers	11	0	19th
2008	Futurecom TME	Audi A4 DTM 2006	(United Kingdom) Katherine Legge	11	0	21st
2009	Kolles Futurecom	Audi A4 DTM 2007	(Czech Republic) Tomáš Kostka	10	0	17th
2009	Kolles Futurecom	Audi A4 DTM 2007	(Denmark) Christian Bakkerud	9	0	19th
2009	Kolles Futurecom	Audi A4 DTM 2007	(Germany) Johannes Seidlitz	8	0	20th

=== Le Mans Series results ===
Year	Teamname	Car	Engine	Driver	Races	Points	Pos.
2009	(Germany) Kolles	Audi R10 TDI	Audi TDI 5.5 L Turbo V12 (Diesel)	(Netherlands) Charles Zwolsman Jr.	5	12	7th
2009	(Germany) Kolles	Audi R10 TDI	Audi TDI 5.5 L Turbo V12 (Diesel)	(United Kingdom) Andrew Meyrick	5	12	7th
2009	(Germany) Kolles	Audi R10 TDI	Audi TDI 5.5 L Turbo V12 (Diesel)	(India) Narain Karthikeyan	4	12	7th
2009	(Germany) Kolles	Audi R10 TDI	Audi TDI 5.5 L Turbo V12 (Diesel)	(Germany) Michael Krumm	1	12	7th
2009	(Germany) Kolles	Audi R10 TDI	Audi TDI 5.5 L Turbo V12 (Diesel)	(Netherlands) Christijan Albers	5	6	10th
2009	(Germany) Kolles	Audi R10 TDI	Audi TDI 5.5 L Turbo V12 (Diesel)	(Denmark) Christian Bakkerud	5	6	10th
2009	(Germany) Kolles	Audi R10 TDI	Audi TDI 5.5 L Turbo V12 (Diesel)	(Switzerland) Giorgio Mondini	3	6	10th

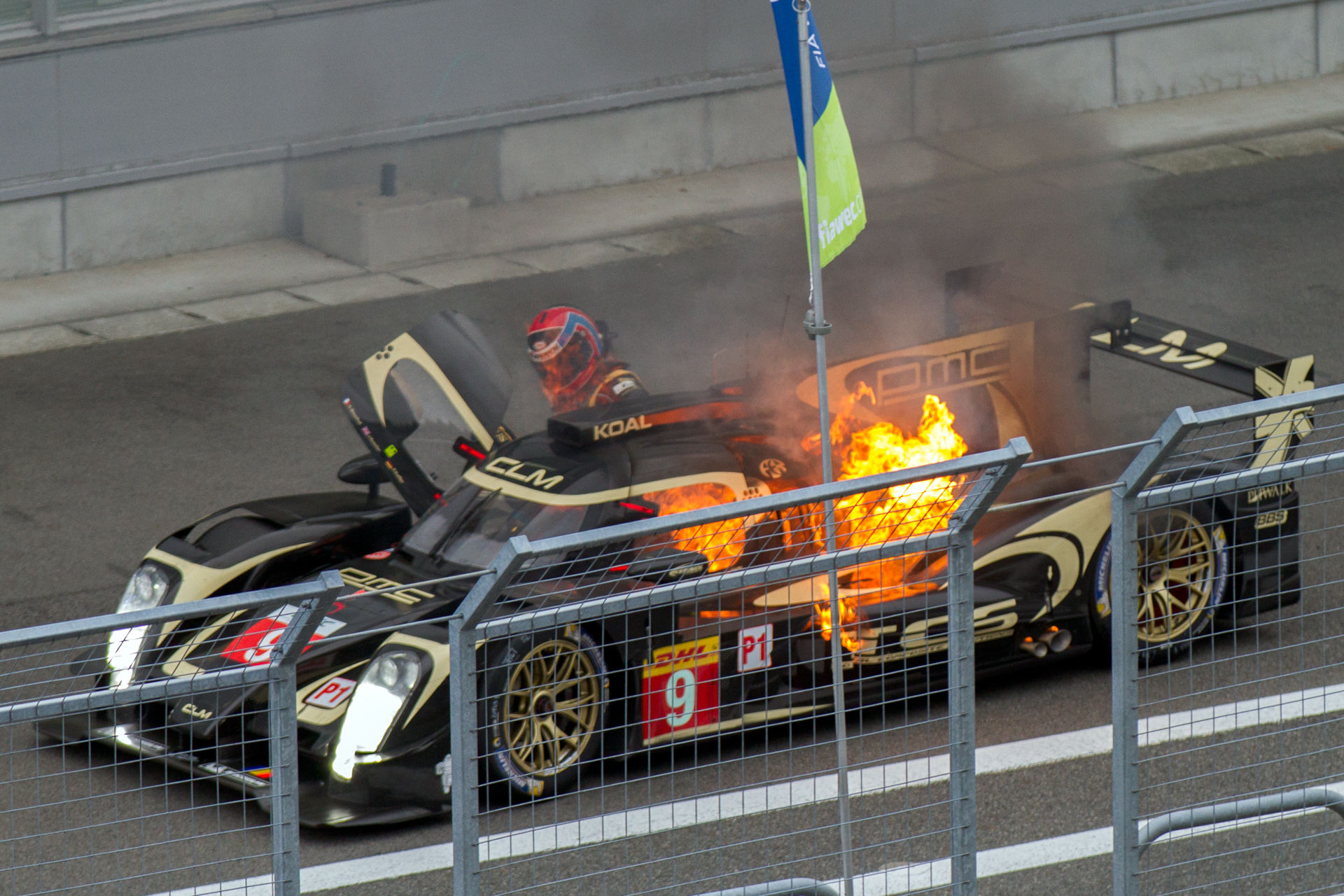
Christophe Bouchut escaping from a burning Lotus CLM P1/01 at Fuji in 2014.

=== FIA World Endurance Championship results ===
Year	Teamname	Car	Engine	Class	Tyre	Driver	Races	Points	Pos.
2012	(Germany) Lotus	Lola B12/80	Lotus (Judd) 3.6 L V8	LMP2	D	(Germany) Thomas Holzer	8	32	8th
2012	(Germany) Lotus	Lola B12/80	Lotus (Judd) 3.6 L V8	LMP2	D	(Germany) Mirco Schultis	7	32	8th
2012	(Germany) Lotus	Lola B12/80	Lotus (Judd) 3.6 L V8	LMP2	D	(Italy) Luca Moro	4	32	8th
2012	(Germany) Lotus	Lola B12/80	Lotus (Judd) 3.6 L V8	LMP2	D	(Netherlands) Renger van der Zande	1	32	8th
2012	(Germany) Lotus	Lola B12/80	Lotus (Judd) 3.6 L V8	LMP2	D	(Netherlands) Christijan Albers	1	32	8th
2012	(Germany) Lotus	Lola B12/80	Lotus (Judd) 3.6 L V8	LMP2	D	(Italy) Luca Moro	1	N/A	NC
2012	(Germany) Lotus	Lola B12/80	Lotus (Judd) 3.6 L V8	LMP2	D	(United States) Kevin Weeda	6	N/A	NC
2012	(Germany) Lotus	Lola B12/80	Lotus (Judd) 3.6 L V8	LMP2	D	(United Kingdom) James Rossiter	6	N/A	NC
2012	(Germany) Lotus	Lola B12/80	Lotus (Judd) 3.6 L V8	LMP2	D	(Italy) Vitantonio Liuzzi	4	N/A	NC
2012	(Germany) Lotus	Lola B12/80	Lotus (Judd) 3.6 L V8	LMP2	D	(Czech Republic) Jan Charouz	1	N/A	NC
2013	(Czech Republic) Lotus	Lotus T128	Praga (Judd) 3.6 L V8	LMP2	D	(United States) Kevin Weeda	8	11	8th
2013	(Czech Republic) Lotus	Lotus T128	Praga (Judd) 3.6 L V8	LMP2	D	(Italy) Vitantonio Liuzzi	6	11	8th
2013	(Czech Republic) Lotus	Lotus T128	Praga (Judd) 3.6 L V8	LMP2	D	(France) Christophe Bouchut	4	11	8th
2013	(Czech Republic) Lotus	Lotus T128	Praga (Judd) 3.6 L V8	LMP2	D	(United Kingdom) James Rossiter	4	11	8th
2013	(Czech Republic) Lotus	Lotus T128	Praga (Judd) 3.6 L V8	LMP2	D	(Austria) Lucas Auer	8	11	8th
2013	(Czech Republic) Lotus	Lotus T128	Praga (Judd) 3.6 L V8	LMP2	D	(Germany) Thomas Holzer	8	37	7th
2013	(Czech Republic) Lotus	Lotus T128	Praga (Judd) 3.6 L V8	LMP2	D	(Austria) Dominik Kraihamer	8	37	7th
2013	(Czech Republic) Lotus	Lotus T128	Praga (Judd) 3.6 L V8	LMP2	D	(Czech Republic) Jan Charouz	8	37	7th
2014	(Romania) Lotus	CLM P1/01	AER P60 2.4 L Turbo V6	LMP1-L	M	(United Kingdom) James Rossiter	2	33	3rd
2014	(Romania) Lotus	CLM P1/01	AER P60 2.4 L Turbo V6	LMP1-L	M	(France) Christophe Bouchut	2	33	3rd
2014	(Romania) Lotus	CLM P1/01	AER P60 2.4 L Turbo V6	LMP1-L	M	(Austria) Lucas Auer	3	33	3rd
2014	(Romania) Lotus	CLM P1/01	AER P60 2.4 L Turbo V6	LMP1-L	M	(Germany) Pierre Kaffer	4	33	3rd
2014	(Romania) Lotus	CLM P1/01	AER P60 2.4 L Turbo V6	LMP1-L	M	(Switzerland) Simon Trummer	1	33	3rd
2014	(Romania) Lotus	CLM P1/01	AER P60 2.4 L Turbo V6	LMP1-L	M	(France) Nathanaël Berthon	1	33	3rd
2015	(Austria) Team ByKolles	CLM P1/01	AER P60 2.4 L Turbo V6	LMP1	M	(Switzerland) Simon Trummer	8	104	3rd
2015	(Austria) Team ByKolles	CLM P1/01	AER P60 2.4 L Turbo V6	LMP1	M	(Italy) Vitantonio Liuzzi	2	104	3rd
2015	(Austria) Team ByKolles	CLM P1/01	AER P60 2.4 L Turbo V6	LMP1	M	(Austria) Christian Klien	2	104	3rd
2015	(Austria) Team ByKolles	CLM P1/01	AER P60 2.4 L Turbo V6	LMP1	M	(Portugal) Tiago Monteiro	1	104	3rd
2015	(Austria) Team ByKolles	CLM P1/01	AER P60 2.4 L Turbo V6	LMP1	M	(Germany) Pierre Kaffer	6	104	3rd
2016	(Austria) ByKolles Racing Team	CLM P1/01	AER P60 2.4 L Turbo V6	LMP1	D	(Switzerland) Simon Trummer	9	109	2nd
2016	(Austria) ByKolles Racing Team	CLM P1/01	AER P60 2.4 L Turbo V6	LMP1	D	(United Kingdom) Oliver Webb	9	109	2nd
2016	(Austria) ByKolles Racing Team	CLM P1/01	AER P60 2.4 L Turbo V6	LMP1	D	(United Kingdom) James Rossiter	2	109	2nd
2016	(Austria) ByKolles Racing Team	CLM P1/01	AER P60 2.4 L Turbo V6	LMP1	D	(Germany) Pierre Kaffer	6	109	2nd
2017	(Austria) ByKolles Racing Team	ENSO CLM P1/01	Nismo VRX30A 3.0 L Turbo V6	LMP1	M	(United Kingdom) Oliver Webb	4	N/A	NC
2017	(Austria) ByKolles Racing Team	ENSO CLM P1/01	Nismo VRX30A 3.0 L Turbo V6	LMP1	M	(Austria) Dominik Kraihamer	4	N/A	NC
2017	(Austria) ByKolles Racing Team	ENSO CLM P1/01	Nismo VRX30A 3.0 L Turbo V6	LMP1	M	(United Kingdom) James Rossiter	2	N/A	NC
2017	(Austria) ByKolles Racing Team	ENSO CLM P1/01	Nismo VRX30A 3.0 L Turbo V6	LMP1	M	(Italy) Marco Bonanomi	4	N/A	NC
2018-2019	(Austria) ByKolles Racing Team	ENSO CLM P1/01	Nismo VRX30A 3.0 L Turbo V6; Gibson GL458 4.5 L V8	LMP1	M	(United Kingdom) Oliver Webb	5	22	4th
2018-2019	(Austria) ByKolles Racing Team	ENSO CLM P1/01	Nismo VRX30A 3.0 L Turbo V6; Gibson GL458 4.5 L V8	LMP1	M	(France) Tom Dillmann	4	22	4th
2018-2019	(Austria) ByKolles Racing Team	ENSO CLM P1/01	Nismo VRX30A 3.0 L Turbo V6; Gibson GL458 4.5 L V8	LMP1	M	(Austria) Dominik Kraihamer	2	22	4th
2018-2019	(Austria) ByKolles Racing Team	ENSO CLM P1/01	Nismo VRX30A 3.0 L Turbo V6; Gibson GL458 4.5 L V8	LMP1	M	(Austria) René Binder	1	22	4th
2018-2019	(Austria) ByKolles Racing Team	ENSO CLM P1/01	Nismo VRX30A 3.0 L Turbo V6; Gibson GL458 4.5 L V8	LMP1	M	(United Kingdom) James Rossiter	2	22	4th
2019-2020	(Austria) ByKolles Racing Team	ENSO CLM P1/01	Gibson GL458 4.5 L V8	LMP1	M	(France) Tom Dillmann	2	N/A	NC
2019-2020	(Austria) ByKolles Racing Team	ENSO CLM P1/01	Gibson GL458 4.5 L V8	LMP1	M	(Canada) Bruno Spengler	2	N/A	NC
2019-2020	(Austria) ByKolles Racing Team	ENSO CLM P1/01	Gibson GL458 4.5 L V8	LMP1	M	(United Kingdom) Oliver Webb	2	N/A	NC
2023	(Austria) Vanwall Racing Team	Vanwall Vandervell 680	Gibson GL458 4.5 L V8	LMH	M	(France) Tom Dillmann	4	10	7th
2023	(Austria) Vanwall Racing Team	Vanwall Vandervell 680	Gibson GL458 4.5 L V8	LMH	M	(Argentina) Esteban Guerrieri	7	10	7th
2023	(Austria) Vanwall Racing Team	Vanwall Vandervell 680	Gibson GL458 4.5 L V8	LMH	M	(Canada) Jacques Villeneuve	3	10	7th
2023	(Austria) Vanwall Racing Team	Vanwall Vandervell 680	Gibson GL458 4.5 L V8	LMH	M	(France) Tristan Vautier	4	10	7th
2023	(Austria) Vanwall Racing Team	Vanwall Vandervell 680	Gibson GL458 4.5 L V8	LMH	M	(Brazil) João Paulo de Oliveira	2	10	7th
2023	(Austria) Vanwall Racing Team	Vanwall Vandervell 680	Gibson GL458 4.5 L V8	LMH	M	(Australia) Ryan Briscoe	1	10	7th

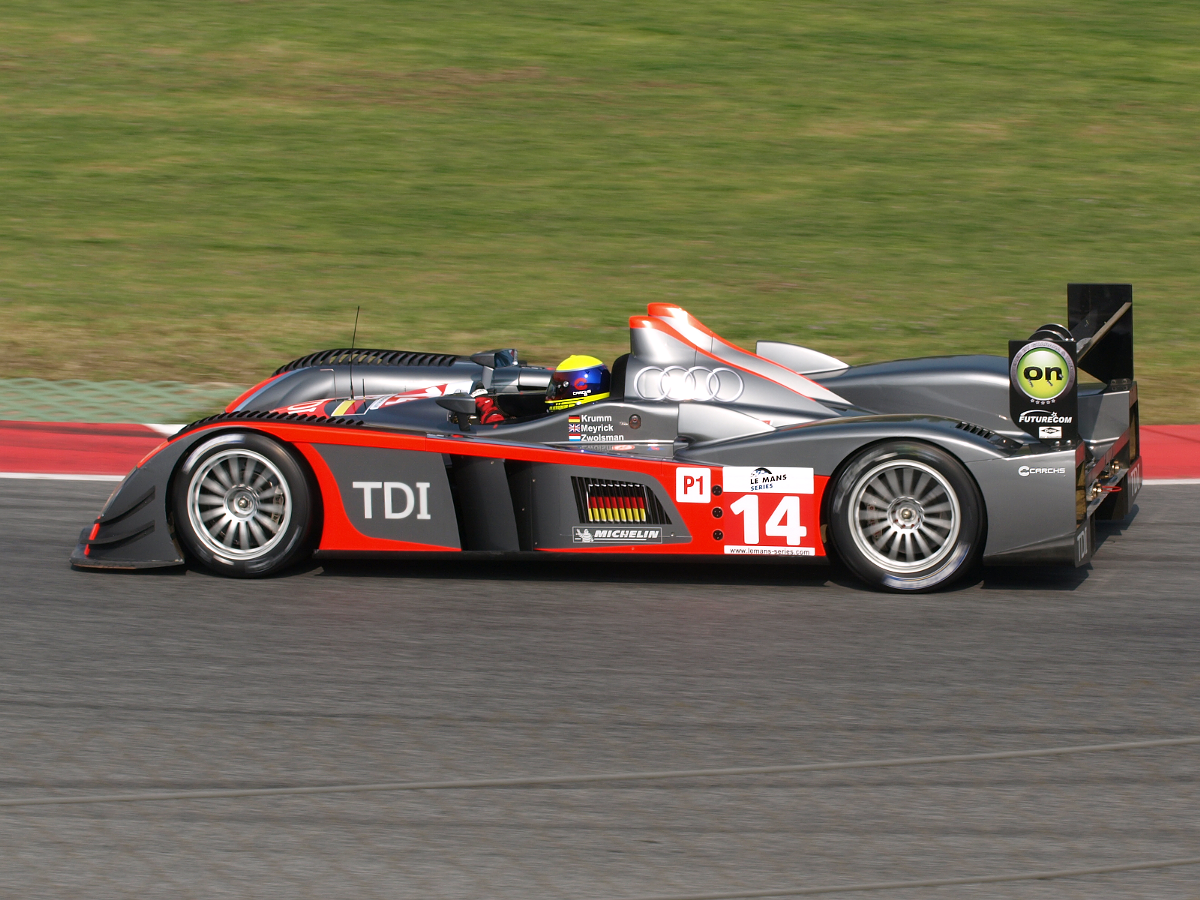
Kolles' Audi R10 TDI at the Circuit de Barcelona-Catalunya in 2009.

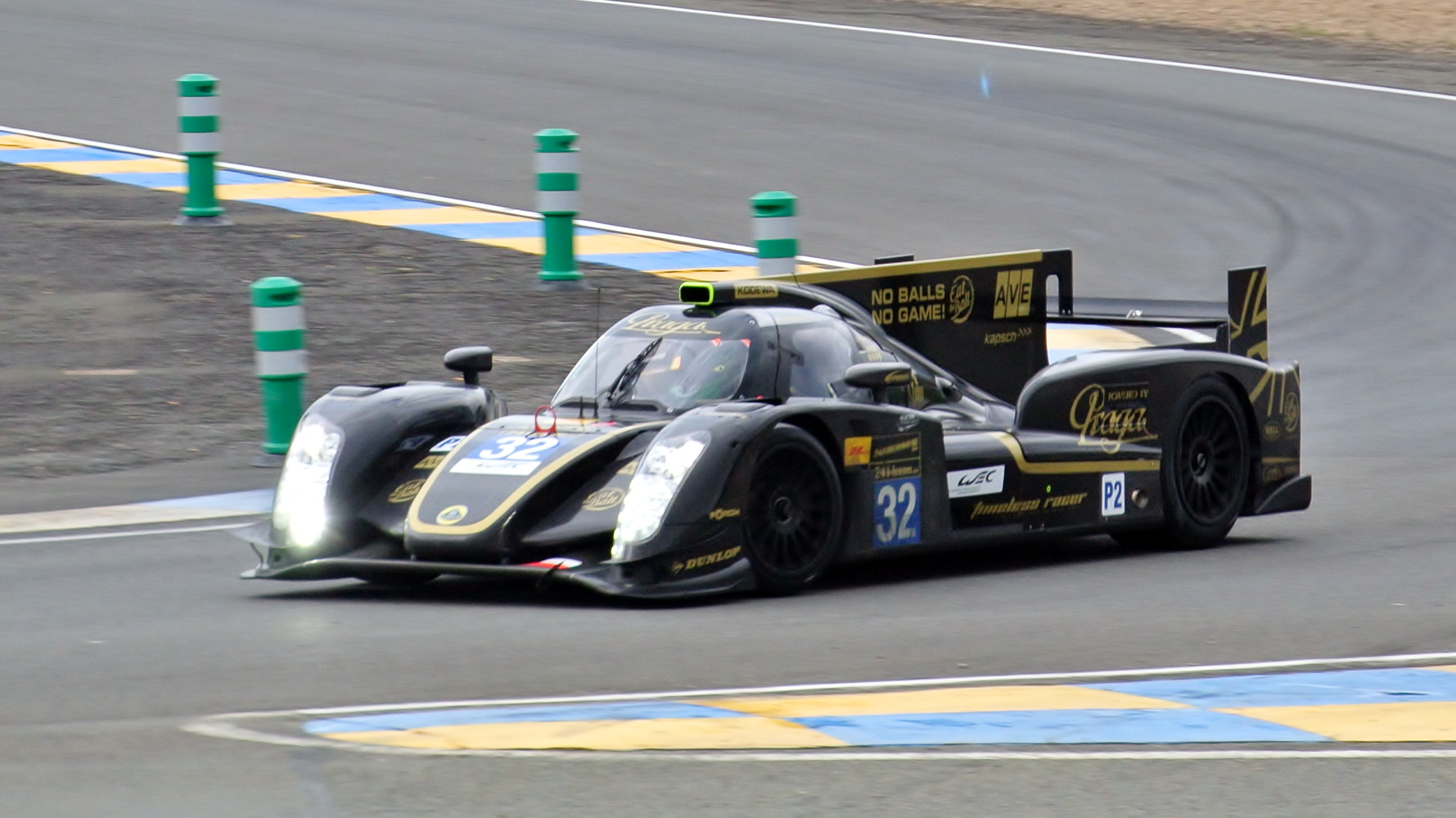
The Lotus T128 at the 2013 24 Hours of Le Mans.

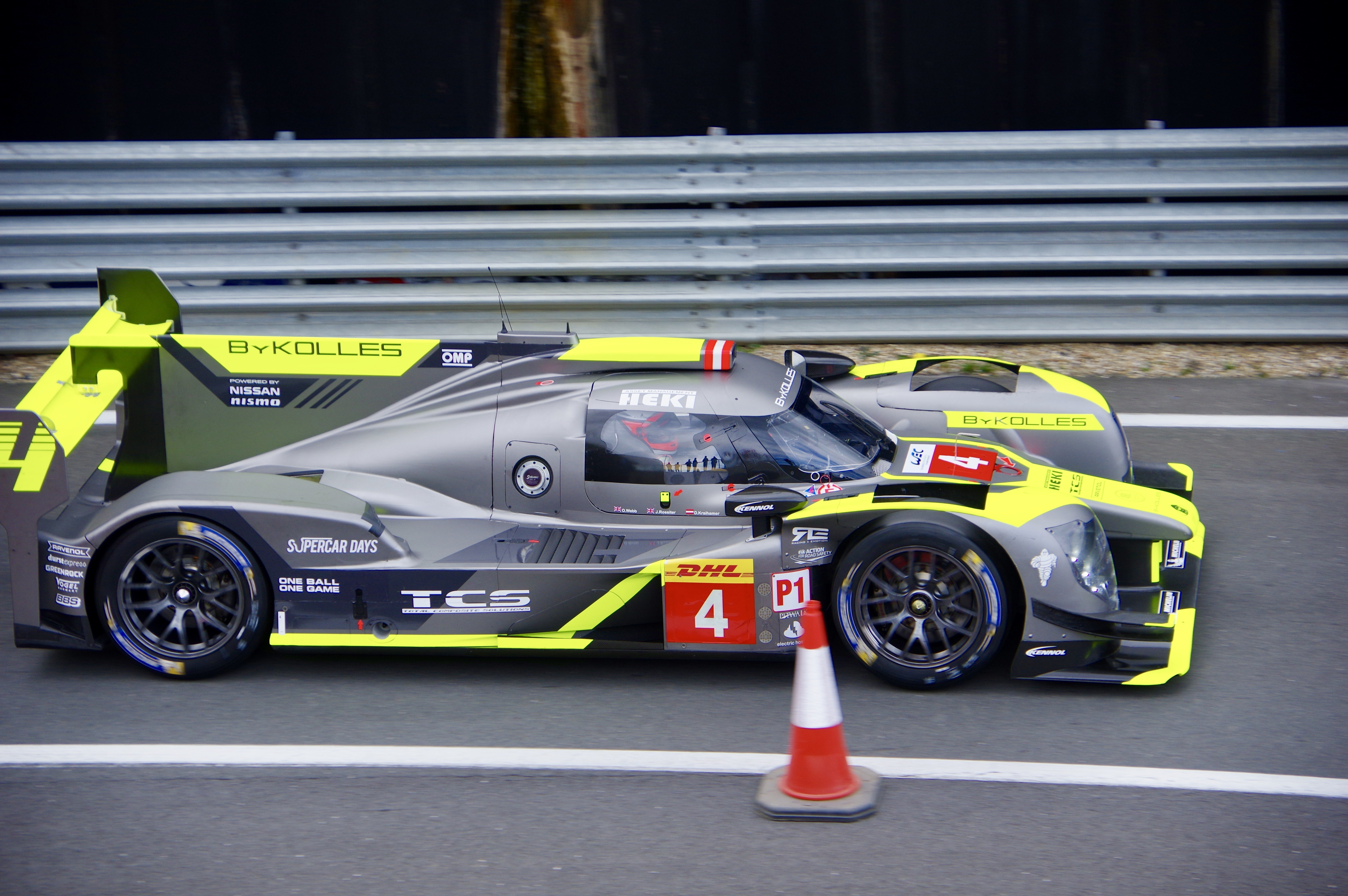
ByKolles' ENSO CLM P1/01 at Silverstone in 2017.

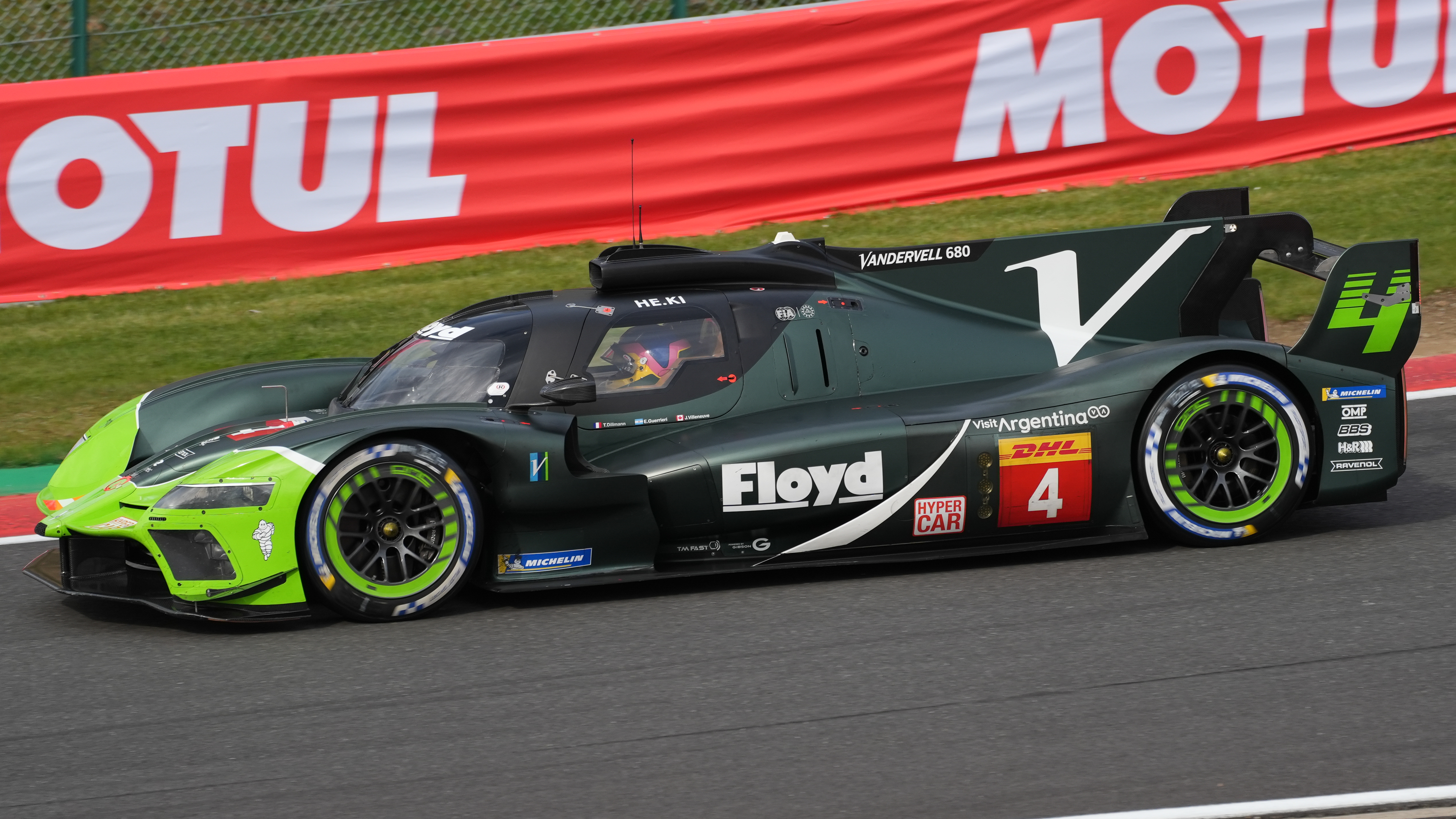
Jacques Villeneuve at the wheel of his Vanwall Vandervell 680 at Spa-Francorchamps in 2023.

=== 24 Hours of Le Mans results ===
Year	Entrant	No.	Car	Drivers	Class	Laps	Pos.	Class Pos.
2009	(Germany) Kolles	14	Audi R10 TDI	(India) ~~Narain Karthikeyan~~ (Note: Karthikeyan, who was nominated as the starting driver for the No. 14 Kolles entry, dislocated his shoulder going over the pitwall before the formation lap. He was unable to take part in the race and was therefore not credited with seventh place.) (Germany) André Lotterer (Netherlands) Charles Zwolsman Jr.	LMP1	369	7th	7th
2009	(Germany) Kolles	15	Audi R10 TDI	(Netherlands) Christijan Albers (Denmark) Christian Bakkerud (Switzerland) Giorgio Mondini	LMP1	360	9th	9th
2010	(Germany) Kolles	14	Audi R10 TDI	(France) Christophe Bouchut (Portugal) Manuel Rodrigues (United States) Scott Tucker	LMP1	182	DNF	DNF
2010	(Germany) Kolles	15	Audi R10 TDI	(Netherlands) Christijan Albers (Denmark) Christian Bakkerud (United Kingdom) Oliver Jarvis	LMP1	331	DNF	DNF
2012	(Germany) Lotus	31	Lola B12/80-Lotus (Judd)	(Germany) Thomas Holzer (Italy) Luca Moro (Germany) Mirco Schultis	LMP2	155	DNF	DNF
2013	(Czech Republic) Lotus	31	Lotus T128-Praga (Judd)	(France) Christophe Bouchut (United Kingdom) James Rossiter (United States) Kevin Weeda	LMP2	17	DNF	DNF
2013	(Czech Republic) Lotus	32	Lotus T128-Praga (Judd)	(Czech Republic) Jan Charouz (Germany) Thomas Holzer (Austria) Dominik Kraihamer	LMP2	219	DNF	DNF
2015	(Austria) Team ByKolles	4	CLM P1/01-AER	(Germany) Pierre Kaffer (Portugal) Tiago Monteiro (Switzerland) Simon Trummer	LMP1	260	EX (Note: The No. 4 ByKolles CLM-AER was excluded from the race for not having the correct driver weight ballast. Prior to the exclusion, the car was not classified in the race results for failing to complete 70 per cent of the overall winner's distance.)	EX
2016	(Austria) ByKolles Racing Team	4	CLM P1/01-AER	(Germany) Pierre Kaffer (Switzerland) Simon Trummer (United Kingdom) Oliver Webb	LMP1	206	DNF	DNF
2017	(Austria) ByKolles Racing Team	4	ENSO CLM P1/01-Nismo	(Italy) Marco Bonanomi (Austria) Dominik Kraihamer (United Kingdom) Oliver Webb	LMP1	7	DNF	DNF
2018	(Austria) ByKolles Racing Team	4	ENSO CLM P1/01-Nismo	(France) Tom Dillmann (Austria) Dominik Kraihamer (United Kingdom) Oliver Webb	LMP1	65	DNF	DNF
2019	(Austria) ByKolles Racing Team	4	ENSO CLM P1/01-Gibson	(France) Tom Dillmann (Italy) Paolo Ruberti (United Kingdom) Oliver Webb	LMP1	163	DNF	DNF
2020	(Austria) ByKolles Racing Team	4	ENSO CLM P1/01-Gibson	(France) Tom Dillmann (Canada) Bruno Spengler (United Kingdom) Oliver Webb	LMP1	97	DNF	DNF
2023	(Austria) Floyd Vanwall Racing Team	4	Vanwall Vandervell 680-Gibson	(France) Tom Dillmann (Argentina) Esteban Guerrieri (France) Tristan Vautier	Hypercar	165	DNF	DNF

== Timeline ==
The series in which the team competed are listed:

Former series
German Formula Three Championship	2000–2002
Formula 3 Euro Series	2003–2004, 2009
Deutsche Tourenwagen Masters	2006–2009
Le Mans Series	2009
FIA World Endurance Championship	2012–2020, 2023
