= Timo Scheider =

German racing driver (born 1978)

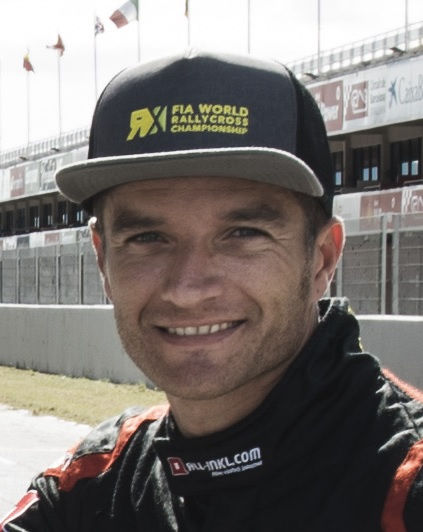
- Timo Scheider in 2015
- Nationality: (Germany) German
- Born: 10 November 1978 (age 47) Lahnstein, West Germany

FIA World Rallycross Championship career
- Debut season: 2015
- Current team: Münnich Motorsport
- Categorisation: FIA Platinum
- Car number: 44
- Former teams: MJP Racing Team Austria
- Starts: 49
- Wins: 1
- Podiums: 6
- Best finish: 4th in 2023

DTM
- Years active: 2000–2016
- Former teams: Team Holzer Opel; Phoenix Racing Opel; Audi Sport Team Rosberg; Abt Sportsline; Audi Sport Team Phoenix
- Starts: 201
- Championships: 2 (2008, 2009)
- Wins: 7
- Podiums: 24
- Poles: 12
- Fastest laps: 14

24 Hours of Le Mans career
- Years: 2010
- Teams: BMS Scuderia Italia
- Best finish: 14th
- Class wins: 0

Previous series
- 2005–06 2005–06 1997–99: A1 Grand Prix; FIA GT Championship; German F3

Championship titles
- 2008, 2009: DTM

Timo Scheider (born 10 November 1978 in Lahnstein) is a German racing driver who last competed in Extreme E for Carl Cox Motorsport. He won the DTM title in 2008 and 2009.

== Career ==
=== Karting ===
Like most other drivers, Scheider started his racing career in karting in 1989. In 1992, he went on to win the Kerpen Winter Cup and earned seventh place in the German Junior Kart NRW-Cup a year later. His seventh place disappointment led to success the next year when he won the cup.

=== Formula Renault ===
In 1995, Scheider joined the German Formula Renault 1800 championship and won it in his first year. The next year, he jumped to the 2000 championship and earned fourth place.

=== Formula Three ===
After only two years in Formula Renault, Scheider moved to Formula Three in 1997, in the German series. He clinched second place behind Nick Heidfeld in 1997 with three wins but his performance deteriorated the next year when he finished seventh, despite three victories. In 1999, he finished sixth, bringing an end to his rise through the single-seater ranks.

=== DTM ===
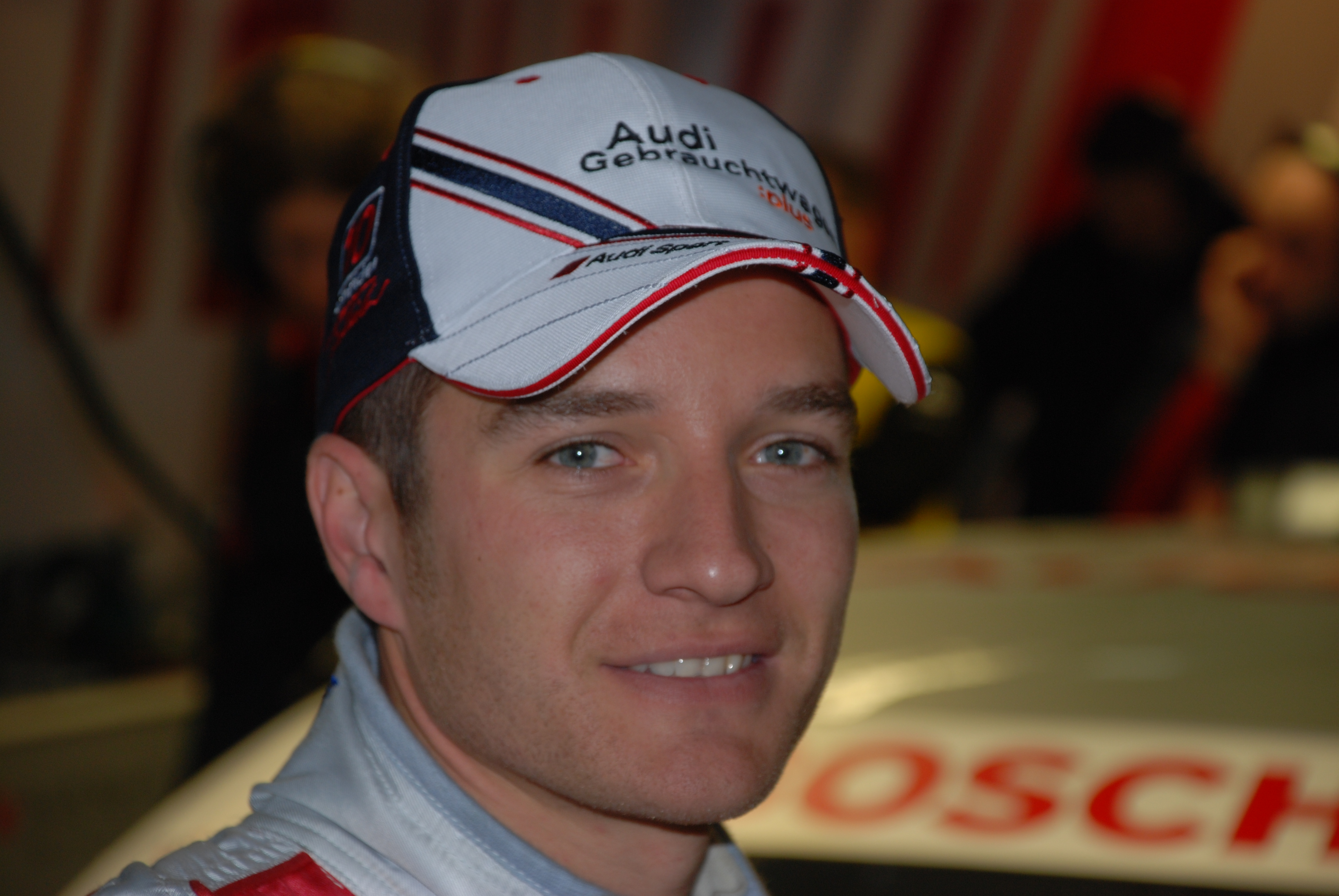
In 2008, as a DTM driver

Scheider spent the next five years of his racing career in DTM for Opel. In his first year in 2000, he finished twelfth followed by a disappointing 19th the next year. He improved to finish eighth in 2002. The following year, he finished eighth again and scored a pole position. He also finished in first place at the 24 Hours Nürburgring. In 2004, Scheider retained his eighth place in DTM and was tenth in the 24 Hours of Nürburgring.

=== GTs ===
Scheider left the DTM in 2005, which became a busy year for Scheider. He joined Vitaphone Racing in the FIA GT Championship, where he finished second. He won the Spa 24 Hours and also at Istanbul. He was 13th overall and class winner in the Nürburgring 24 Hours. He was also selected for A1 Team Germany that year.

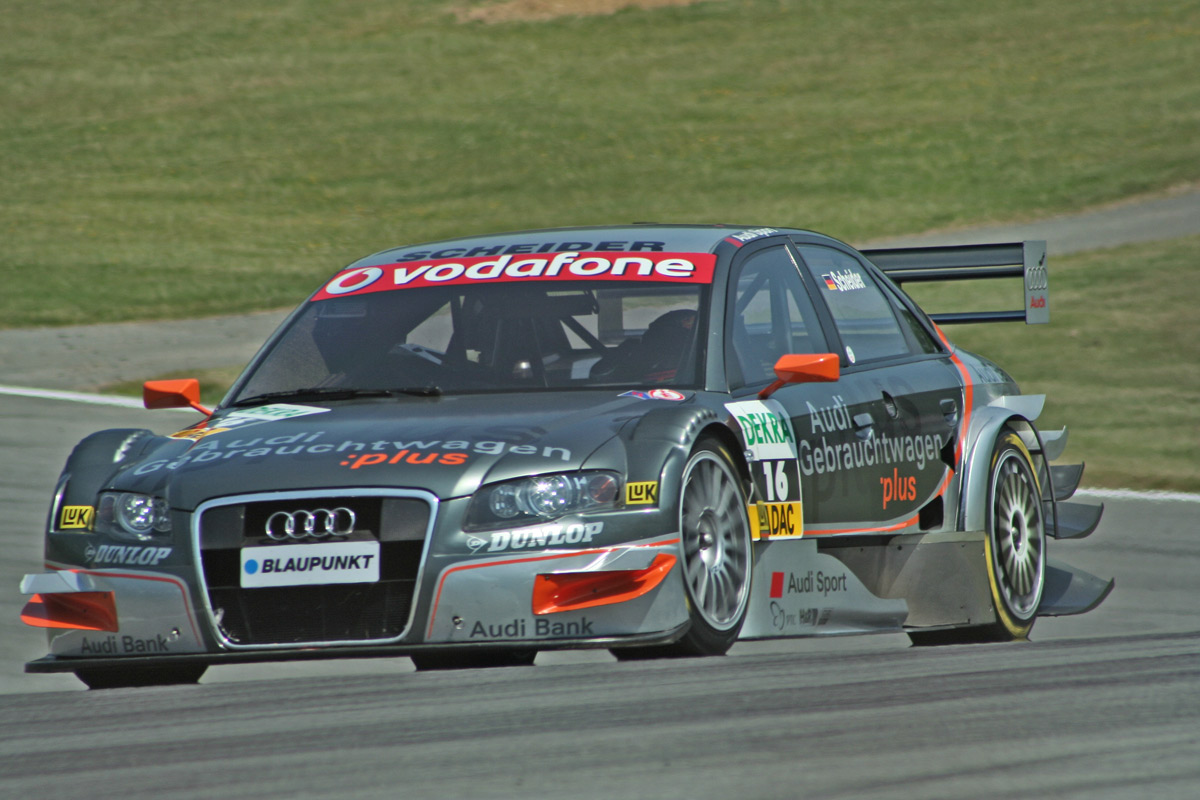
Scheider driving for Audi (Team Rosberg) in the 2006 DTM season, at Brands Hatch.

=== Return to DTM ===
After one year away, Scheider returned to the DTM in 2006 with Audi Sport Team Rosberg, finishing the season in tenth place. In 2007, he joined the works Audi team, Abt Sportsline, finally taking his first podium finish as he finished seventh overall.

2008 showed great improvement from Scheider, winning three races as he won the 2008 DTM Championship, finishing four points ahead of Paul di Resta of Mercedes-Benz. In 2009, he repeated his title success for Audi, beating closest rival Gary Paffett by five points over the ten rounds, taking two victories. He therefore become the only second DTM driver after Bernd Schneider to defend his title.

=== Retirement from DTM ===
As of October 2016, Scheider announced his retirement from DTM, effective at the end of the season.

=== Rallycross ===
After making sporadic appearances in the 2015 and 2016 FIA World Rallycross Championship for Münnich Motorsport, Scheider signed with MJP Racing Team Austria for a full 2017 campaign. He finished second in the opening round in Barcelona.

=== Extreme E ===
Scheider would make his Extreme E debut in the 2023 season for Carl Cox Motorsport with Christine GZ as his teammate.

Scheider would be the team principal and driver for a new team called SUN Minimeal XE Team in the 2024 season alongside Klara Andersson.

== Racing record ==
=== Complete Deutsche Tourenwagen Masters results ===
(key) (Races in bold indicate pole position) (Races in italics indicate fastest lap)

Year	Team	Car	1	2	3	4	5	6	7	8	9	10	11	12	13	14	15	16	17	18	19	20	DC	Points
2000	OPC Team Holzer	Opel Astra V8 Coupé	HOC; 1; 4	HOC; 2; 4	OSC; 1; 5	OSC; 2; 7	NOR; 1; 12	NOR; 2; 11	SAC; 1; 7	SAC; 2; 7	NÜR; 1; 16	NÜR; 2; 11	LAU; 1 C	LAU; 2 C	OSC; 1; 8	OSC; 2; 9	NÜR; 1; 11	NÜR; 2; 16	HOC; 1; 11	HOC; 2 Ret			12th	45
2001	OPC Team Holzer	Opel Astra V8 Coupé	HOC; QR; 15	HOC; CR; 11	NÜR; QR; 16	NÜR; CR; 10	OSC; QR; 18	OSC; CR; 12	SAC; QR; 13	SAC; CR; 12	NOR; QR; 9	NOR; CR; Ret	LAU; QR; 9	LAU; CR; 11	NÜR; QR; 11	NÜR; CR; Ret	A1R; QR; Ret	A1R; CR; DNS	ZAN; QR; 13	ZAN; CR; 6	HOC; QR; 5	HOC; CR; Ret	19th	7
2002	OPC Team Holzer	Opel Astra V8 Coupé	HOC; QR; 5	HOC; CR; 5	ZOL; QR; 4	ZOL; CR; 5	DON; QR; 5	DON; CR; Ret	SAC; QR; 7	SAC; CR; 6	NOR; QR; Ret	NOR; CR; DNS	LAU; QR; 15	LAU; CR; 10	NÜR; QR; 9	NÜR; CR; 7	A1R; QR; 11	A1R; CR; 8	ZAN; QR; 8	ZAN; CR; 5	HOC; QR; 7	HOC; CR; 4	8th	10
2003	OPC Team Phoenix	Opel Astra V8 Coupé	HOC; 7	ADR; 15	NÜR; 13	LAU; 4	NOR; 16	DON; 8	NÜR; 7	A1R; Ret	**ZAN**; Ret	HOC; 7											8th	12
2004	OPC Team Holzer	Opel Vectra GTS V8 2004	HOC; 8	EST; 6	ADR; 5	LAU; 16	NOR; Ret	SHA^{1} Ret	NÜR; 6	OSC; 7	ZAN; 12	BRN; 7	HOC; 9										8th	15
2006	Audi Sport Team Rosberg	Audi A4 DTM 2005	HOC; 8	LAU; 9	OSC; 14	BRH; 10	NOR; 7	NÜR; 7	ZAN; 6	CAT; Ret	BUG; 8	HOC; 6											10th	12
2007	Abt Sportsline	Audi A4 DTM 2007	HOC; 9	OSC; 4	LAU; 5	BRH; 13	NOR; 14	MUG; 20	**ZAN**; 4	NÜR; 4	CAT; Ret	HOC; 2											7th	25
2008	Abt Sportsline	Audi A4 DTM 2008	**HOC**; 2	**OSC**; 1	**MUG**; 10	LAU; 2	NOR; 3	ZAN; 2	NÜR; 5	**BRH**; 1	CAT; 2	BUG; 6	**HOC**; 1										**1st**	**75**
2009	Abt Sportsline	Audi A4 DTM 2009	HOC; 2	LAU; 5	**NOR**; 4	ZAN; DSQ	OSC; 1	NÜR; 2	BRH; 2	CAT; 1	DIJ; 6	HOC; 2											**1st**	**64**
2010	Abt Sportsline	Audi A4 DTM 2009	HOC; 7	VAL; 4	LAU; 8	NOR; 5	NÜR; 4	**ZAN**; 3	BRH; 3	OSC; 11	**HOC**; 2	ADR; 1	SHA; 3										4th	53
2011	Abt Sportsline	Audi A4 DTM 2009	HOC; 4	ZAN; 5	SPL; 7	LAU; 2	NOR; 4	NÜR; 4	BRH; 16	OSC; Ret	VAL; 4	HOC; 7											4th	36
2012	Abt Sportsline	Audi A5 DTM	HOC; Ret	LAU; 6	BRH; Ret	SPL; 6	NOR; 16	NÜR; 9	**ZAN**; Ret	OSC; 10	VAL; Ret	HOC; 12											14th	19
2013	Audi Sport Team Abt	Audi RS5 DTM	**HOC**; 6	BRH; 9	SPL; 16	LAU; 20	NOR; Ret	MSC; 9	NÜR; Ret	OSC; 5	ZAN; 3	HOC; 13											10th	37
2014	Audi Sport Team Phoenix	Audi RS5 DTM	HOC; 9	OSC; 7	HUN; Ret	NOR; 10	MSC; Ret	SPL; 5	NÜR; Ret	LAU; 3	ZAN; 9	HOC; 6											9th	44
2015	Audi Sport Team Phoenix	Audi RS5 DTM	HOC; 1 Ret	HOC; 2; 12	LAU; 1; 8	LAU; 2; 4	NOR; 1; 16	NOR; 2; 16	ZAN; 1; 14	ZAN; 2; 15	SPL; 1; 16	SPL; 2 DSQ	MSC; 1	MSC; 2	OSC; 1; 12	OSC; 2; 12	NÜR; 1 Ret	NÜR; 2 Ret	HOC; 1; 1	HOC; 2; 5			18th	51
2016	Audi Sport Team Phoenix	Audi RS5 DTM	HOC; 1 Ret	HOC; 2 Ret	SPL; 1; 17	SPL; 2; 10	LAU; 1; 17	LAU; 2; 16	NOR; 1; 16	NOR; 2; 16	ZAN; 1; 11	ZAN; 2 Ret	MSC; 1; 9	MSC; 2; 13	NÜR; 1; 21	NÜR; 2; 11	HUN; 1; 9	HUN; 2; 6	HOC; 1; 16	HOC; 2; 18			22nd	13

^{1} - Shanghai was a non-championship round.

=== Complete A1 Grand Prix results ===
(key)

Year	Entrant	1	2	3	4	5	6	7	8	9	10	11	12	13	14	15	16	17	18	19	20	21	22	DC	Points
2005–06	A1 Team Germany	GBR; SPR; 14	GBR; FEA; 10	GER; SPR; 5	GER; FEA; 10	POR; SPR	POR; FEA	AUS; SPR	AUS; FEA	MYS; SPR; 12	MYS; FEA; 8	UAE; SPR	UAE; FEA	RSA; SPR; 7	RSA; FEA; Ret	IDN; SPR; 12	IDN; FEA; 12	MEX; SPR; 8	MEX; FEA; 5	USA; SPR; 7	USA; FEA; 2	CHN; SPR	CHN; FEA	15th	38

=== 24 Hours of Le Mans results ===
Year	Team	Co-Drivers	Car	Class	Laps	Pos.	Class Pos.
2010	BMS Scuderia Italia	(Germany) Marco Holzer (United Kingdom) Richard Westbrook	Porsche 997 GT3-RSR	GT2	327	14th	**3rd**

=== Complete FIA World Rallycross Championship results ===
==== Supercar/RX1/RX1e ====
Year	Entrant	Car	1	2	3	4	5	6	7	8	9	10	11	12	13	WRX	Points
2015	All-Inkl.com Münnich Motorsport	Audi S3	POR	HOC	BEL	GBR	GER	SWE	CAN	NOR	FRA	BAR; 16	TUR	ITA	ARG	34th	1
2016	All-Inkl.com Münnich Motorsport	SEAT Ibiza	POR	HOC	BEL	GBR	NOR	SWE	CAN	FRA	BAR; 17	LAT; 7	GER	ARG; 4		18th	25
2017	MJP Racing Team Austria	Ford Fiesta	BAR; 2	POR; 15	HOC; 7	BEL; 11	GBR	NOR; 12	SWE; 10	CAN; 12	FRA; 9	LAT; 15	GER; 15	RSA; 5		10th	109
2018	All-Inkl.com Münnich Motorsport	SEAT Ibiza	BAR	POR	BEL	GBR	NOR	SWE; 17	CAN	FRA; 25	LAT; 13	USA	GER	RSA; 10		18th	13
2019	All-Inkl.com Münnich Motorsport	SEAT Ibiza	ABU; 6	BAR; 10	BEL; 10	GBR; 4	NOR; 11	SWE; 22	CAN; 11	FRA; 8	LAT; 11	RSA; 6				9th	109
2020	All-Inkl.com Münnich Motorsport	SEAT Ibiza	SWE; 3	SWE; 4	FIN; 5	FIN; 9	LAT; 12	LAT; 10	BAR; 9	BAR; 9						8th	92
2021	ALL-INKL.COM Münnich Motorsport	SEAT Ibiza	BAR; 7	SWE	FRA; 6	LAT; 6	LAT; 7	BEL; 9	PRT	GER	GER					8th	75
2023	ALL-INKL.COM Münnich Motorsport	SEAT Ibiza RX1e	POR; 9	NOR; 3	SWE; 5	GBR; C	BLX; C	GER; C								4th	89
2023	ALL-INKL.COM Münnich Motorsport	OMSE ZEROID X1							RSA; 3	RSA; 1	CHN; 3	CHN; 9				4th	89

=== Complete World Touring Car Cup results ===
(key) (Races in bold indicate pole position) (Races in italics indicate fastest lap)

Year	Team	Car	1	2	3	4	5	6	7	8	9	10	11	12	13	14	15	16	17	18	19	20	21	22	23	24	25	26	27	28	29	30	DC	Points
2018	ALL-INKL.COM Münnich Motorsport	Honda Civic Type R TCR	MAR; 1	MAR; 2	MAR; 3	HUN; 1	HUN; 2	HUN; 3	GER; 1	GER; 2	GER; 3	NED; 1	NED; 2	NED; 3	POR; 1	POR; 2	POR; 3	SVK; 1	SVK; 2	SVK; 3	CHN; 1; 11	CHN; 2; 19	CHN; 3; 11	WUH; 1; 19	WUH; 2 Ret	WUH; 3 Ret	JPN; 1; 19	JPN; 2; 16	JPN; 3; 13	MAC; 1; 8	MAC; 2; 2	MAC; 3 Ret	22nd	24

=== Complete Extreme E results ===
(key)

Year	Team	Car	1	2	3	4	5	6	7	8	9	10	Pos.	Points
2022	Xite Energy Racing	Spark ODYSSEY 21	DES	ISL1; 2	ISL2; 10	COP; 9	ENE						13th	21
2023	Carl Cox Motorsport	Spark ODYSSEY 21	DES; 1; 7	DES; 2; 9	HYD; 1; 3	HYD; 2 DNS	ISL1; 1; 9	ISL1; 2; 10	ISL2; 1; 5	ISL2; 2; 8	COP; 1; 6	COP; 2; 9	11th	47
2024	SUN Minimeal Team	Spark ODYSSEY 21	DES; 1; 8	DES; 2; 7	HYD; 1; 6	HYD; 2; 7	ISL1; 1 C	ISL1; 2 C	ISL2; 1 C	ISL2; 2 C	VAL; 1 C	VAL; 2 C	7th ^{†}	24 ^{†}
2025	Carl Cox Motorsport	Spark ODYSSEY 21	DES; 1; 8	DES; 2; 6									N/A	N/A

^{†} Season abandoned.

Sporting positions
Preceded by Mattias Ekström	Deutsche Tourenwagen Masters; Champion; 2008-09	Succeeded by Paul di Resta
