= Luca Moro (racing driver) =

Italian racing driver

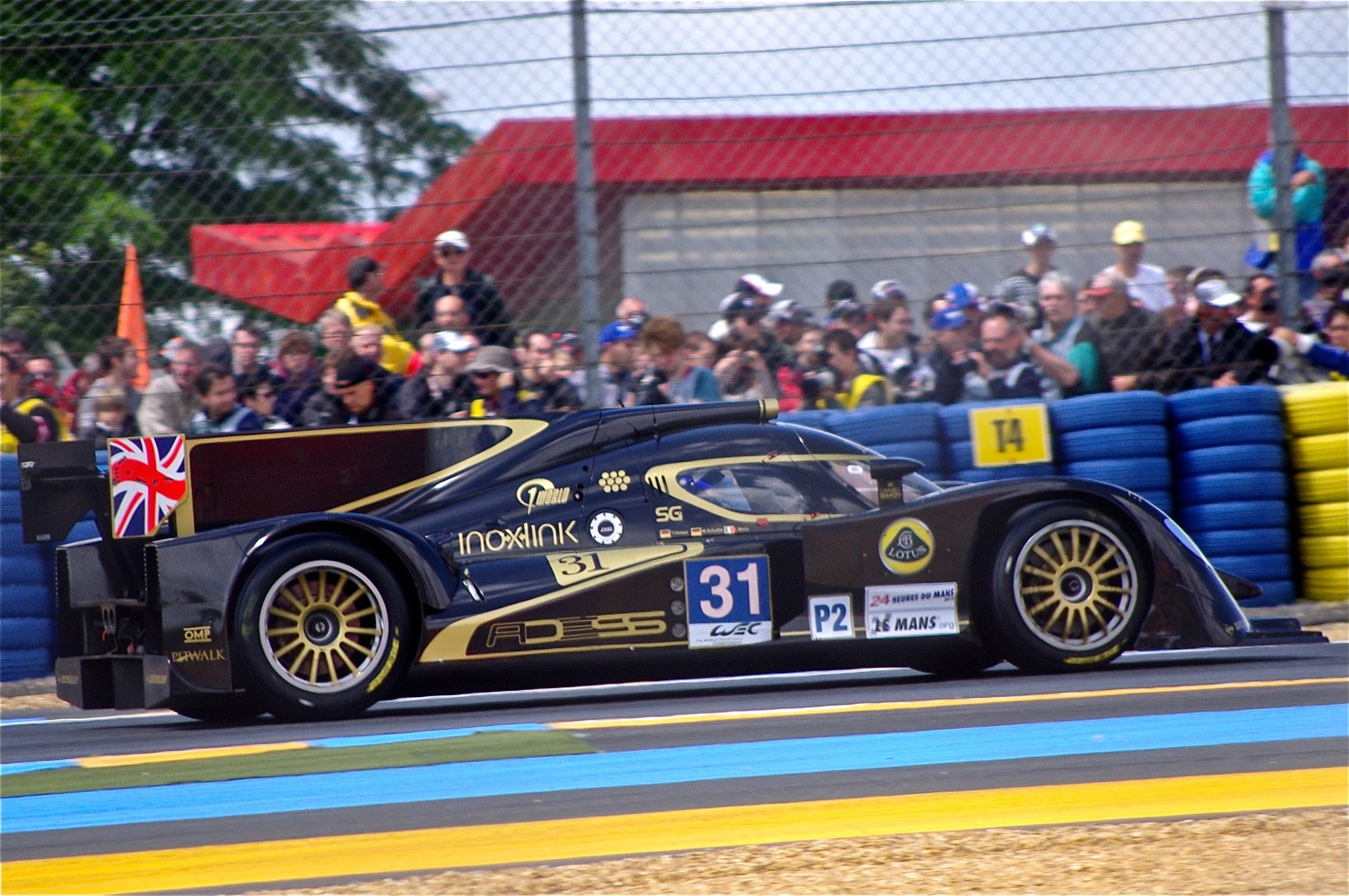
- Moro's Lotus Lola in 2012
- Nationality: (Italy) Italian
- Born: 27 February 1973 Cagliari, Italy
- Died: 14 March 2014 (aged 41) Milan, Italy

Luca Moro (27 February 1973 – 14 March 2014) was an Italian racing driver from Cagliari, Italy.

== Career ==
Moro was best known for his involvement in sports car racing, especially his participation in the 24 Hours of Le Mans. He drove one of the two Lotus LMP2 cars in 2012 at Le Mans. He had two wins, eight podiums and one pole position in his career, with his last win being with the Hope Polevision Racing team at the 2010 1000 km of Spa.

In 2006, Moro was suspended from racing for two years after testing positive for Benzoylecgonine at the 2006 FIA GT Championship.

== Death ==
Moro was hospitalized on 6 March 2014 in Milan. He died there at the age of 41 on 15 March of an apparent brain tumor.

== 24 Hours of Le Mans results ==
| Year | Team | Co-Drivers | Car | Class | Laps | Pos. | Class Pos. |
|---|---|---|---|---|---|---|---|
| 2012 | (Germany) Lotus | (Germany) Thomas Holzer (Germany) Mirco Schultis | Lola B08/80-Lotus (Judd) | LMP2 | 155 | DNF | DNF |
