= Audi A4 DTM =

Touring car model

Audi A4 DTM R11, R12, R12+, R13, R14, R14+
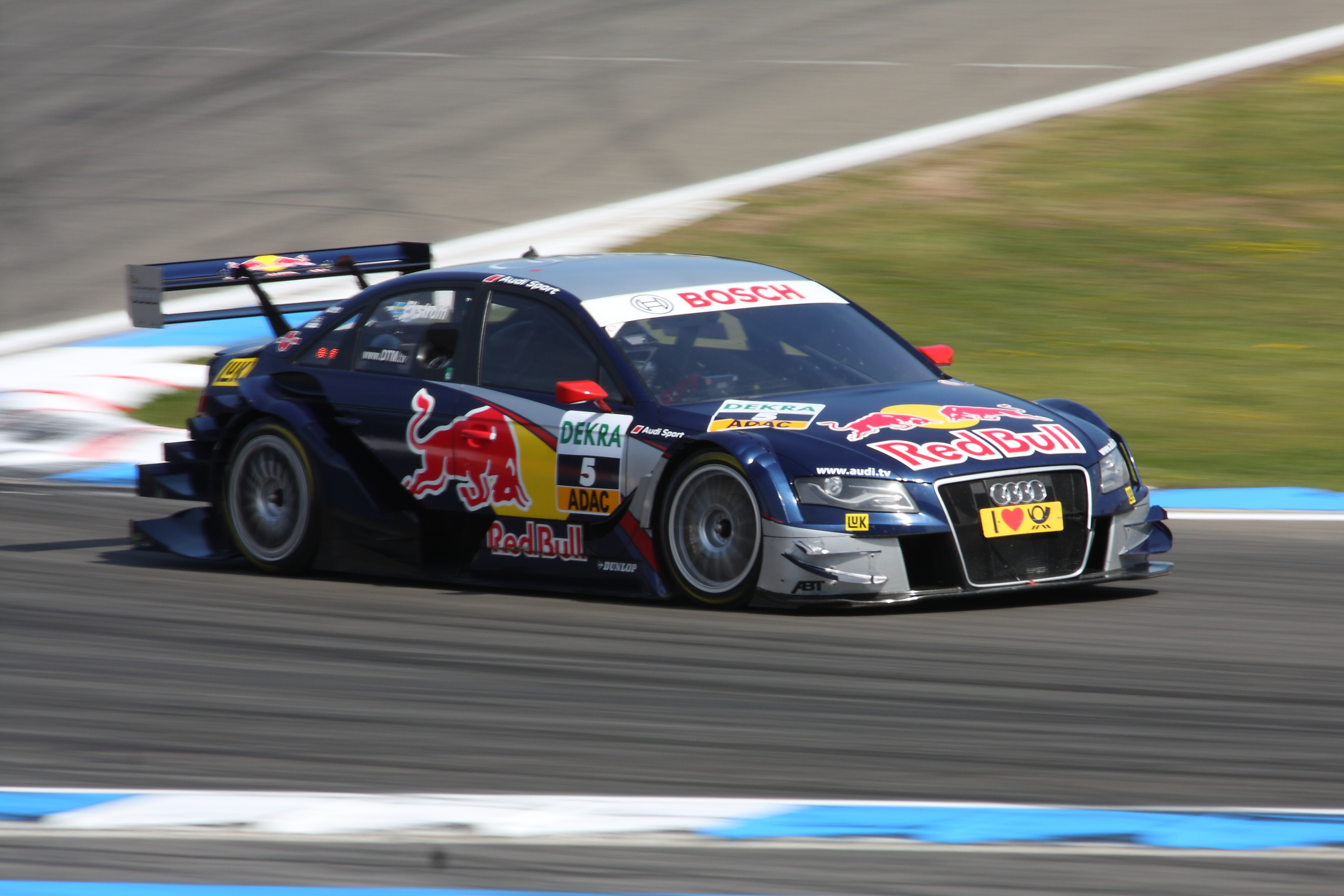
- Mattias Ekström in 2010
- Category: Deutsche Tourenwagen Masters (Touring Cars)
- Constructor: (Germany) Audi
- Designers: Wolfgang Appel (Director, Vehicle Technology); Ulrich Baretzky (Director, Engine Technology); Stefan Aicher (Technical Project Leader)
- Predecessor: Abt-Audi TT-R DTM
- Successor: Audi A5 DTM

Technical specifications
- Chassis: Space frame with carbon-fibre monocoque
- Suspension (front): Pushrod with double wishbones coupled with DSSV/Öhlins dampers
- Suspension (rear): As front
- Length: 4,800 mm (189 in)
- Width: 1,850 mm (73 in)
- Height: 1,200 mm (47 in)
- Wheelbase: 2,795 mm (110 in)
- Engine: Neil Brown-built and assembled Mugen Honda MF308N (rebadged as Audi Sport) 4.0 L (244 cu in) V8 90° naturally aspirated, front engined, longitudinally mounted
- Torque: 368.8 lb⋅ft (500.0 N⋅m)
- Transmission: Hewland/Xtrac 6-speed sequential manual shift gearbox with limited-slip differential
- Power: 460 hp (343 kW; 466 PS); 460 brake horsepower (340 kW)
- Weight: 1,080 kg (2,381 lb) (2004) later 1,070 kg (2,359 lb) (2007-2008) later 1,050 kg (2,315 lb) (2005-2006, 2009-2011) including driver
- Fuel: Shell V-Power (2004 to mid-2005) later Aral Ultimate 102 RON (mid-2005 to 2011)
- Lubricants: Castrol Formula RS (2004-2007), Shell Helix (2004-2005 and 2008) later Castrol EDGE (2009-2011)
- Tyres: Dunlop SP Sport Maxx (2004-2010); Hankook Ventus (2011); O.Z. Racing forged aluminium wheels

Competition history
- Notable entrants: (Germany) Audi Sport Team Abt (Germany) Audi Sport Team Joest (Germany) Audi Sport Team Phoenix (Germany) Audi Sport Team Rosberg (Germany) Futurecom TME
- Notable drivers: (Sweden) Mattias Ekström (Germany) Martin Tomczyk (Germany) Christian Abt (Denmark) Tom Kristensen (Italy) Rinaldo Capello (Italy) Emanuele Pirro (Germany) Frank Biela (United Kingdom) Allan McNish (Germany) Pierre Kaffer (Germany) Frank Stippler (Germany) Heinz-Harald Frentzen (Germany) Timo Scheider (Germany) Mike Rockenfeller (Netherlands) Olivier Tielemans (Netherlands) Jeroen Bleekemolen (Denmark) Nicolas Kiesa (Sweden) Thed Björk (Belgium) Vanina Ickx (Germany) Marco Werner (Germany) Markus Winkelhock (Germany) Lucas Luhr (France) Alexandre Prémat (United Kingdom) Adam Carroll (United Kingdom) Oliver Jarvis (United Kingdom) Katherine Legge (Netherlands) Christijan Albers (Denmark) Christian Bakkerud (Germany) Johannes Seidlitz (Czech Republic) Tomáš Kostka (Spain) Miguel Molina (Hong Kong) Darryl O'Young (Switzerland) Rahel Frey (Portugal) Filipe Albuquerque (Italy) Edoardo Mortara
- Debut: 2004 Hockenheimring 1 Deutsche Tourenwagen Masters round
Races	Wins	Poles	F/Laps
87 (including non-championship race at Shanghai and Olympiastadion Munich)	35 (including non-championship race at Olympiastadion Munich)	44	32
- Constructors' Championships: 3 (2004, 2007, 2011)
- Drivers' Championships: 5 (2004 by Mattias Ekström, 2007 by Mattias Ekström, 2008 by Timo Scheider, 2009 by Timo Scheider, 2011 by Martin Tomczyk)

The Audi A4 DTM is a 4-door touring car (DTM) constructed by the German car manufacturer Audi. It was first developed for use in the 2004 DTM season, replacing the Audi TT DTM at the end of the 2003 DTM season. Based on the Audi A4, it was continually improved over the course of six facelifts between 2004 and 2011. The Audi A4 DTM was succeeded by the Audi A5 DTM in 2012.

The Audi A4 DTM was powered by Mugen Honda MF308 naturally-aspirated V8 engine but rebadged as Audi Sport due to keep costs down.

== Comeback as a factory team ==
After the private Team Abt Audi TT-R was raced from 2000 to 2003, Audi re-entered the DTM series with a factory team since 1992. Audi's comeback resulted in a successful start and finish with titles for the driver, team, and manufacturer rating of the championship race.

== Production A4 DTM Edition ==
To celebrate its first DTM championship title win in 2004, Audi released a production variant of the A4 called the DTM from 2005 to 2007. It featured an additional 20-horsepower over the standard model, sports-styled exterior features, and a new version of the quattro all-wheel-drive system.

== Gallery ==
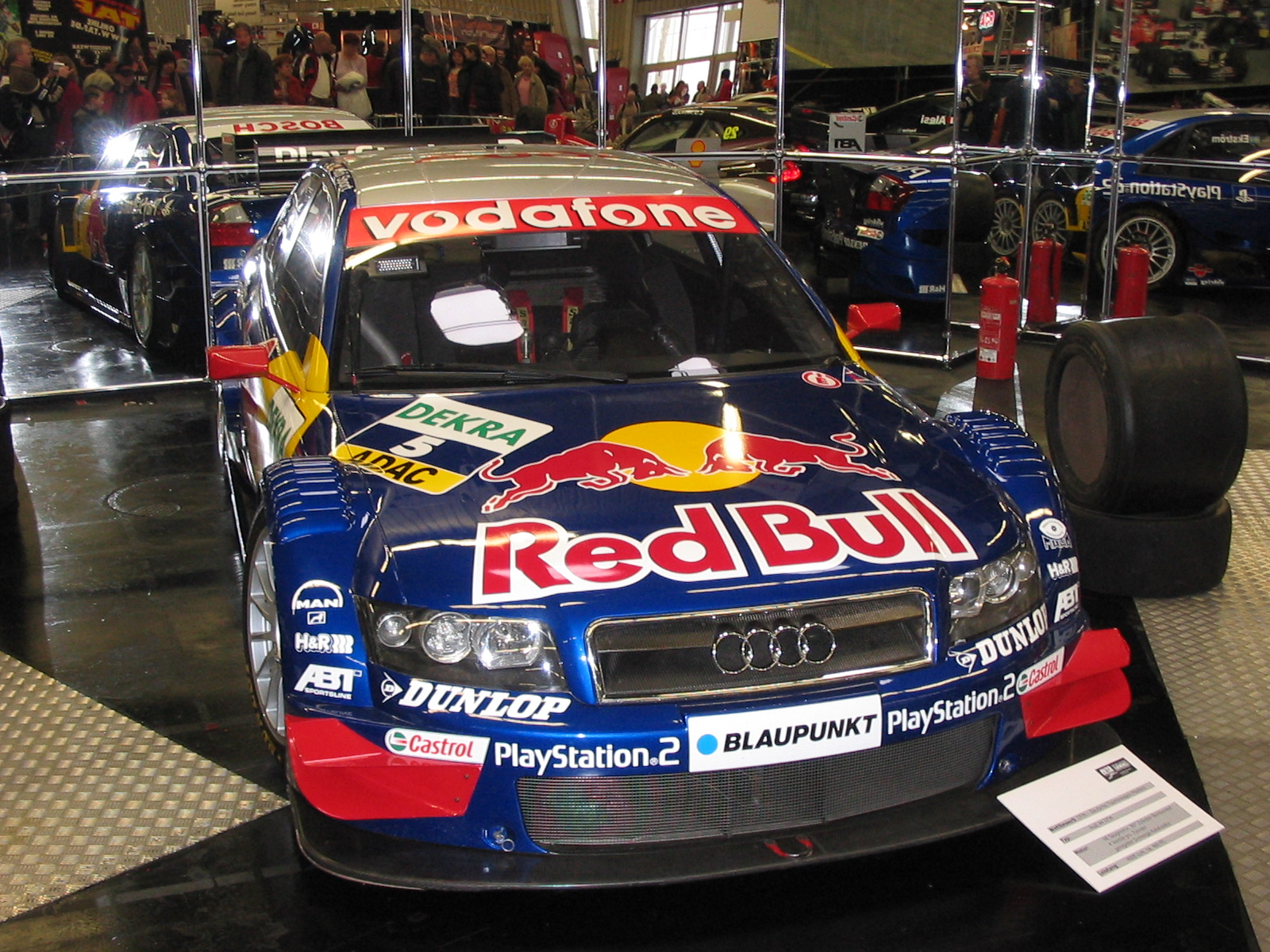
2004 R11 (Mattias Ekström)

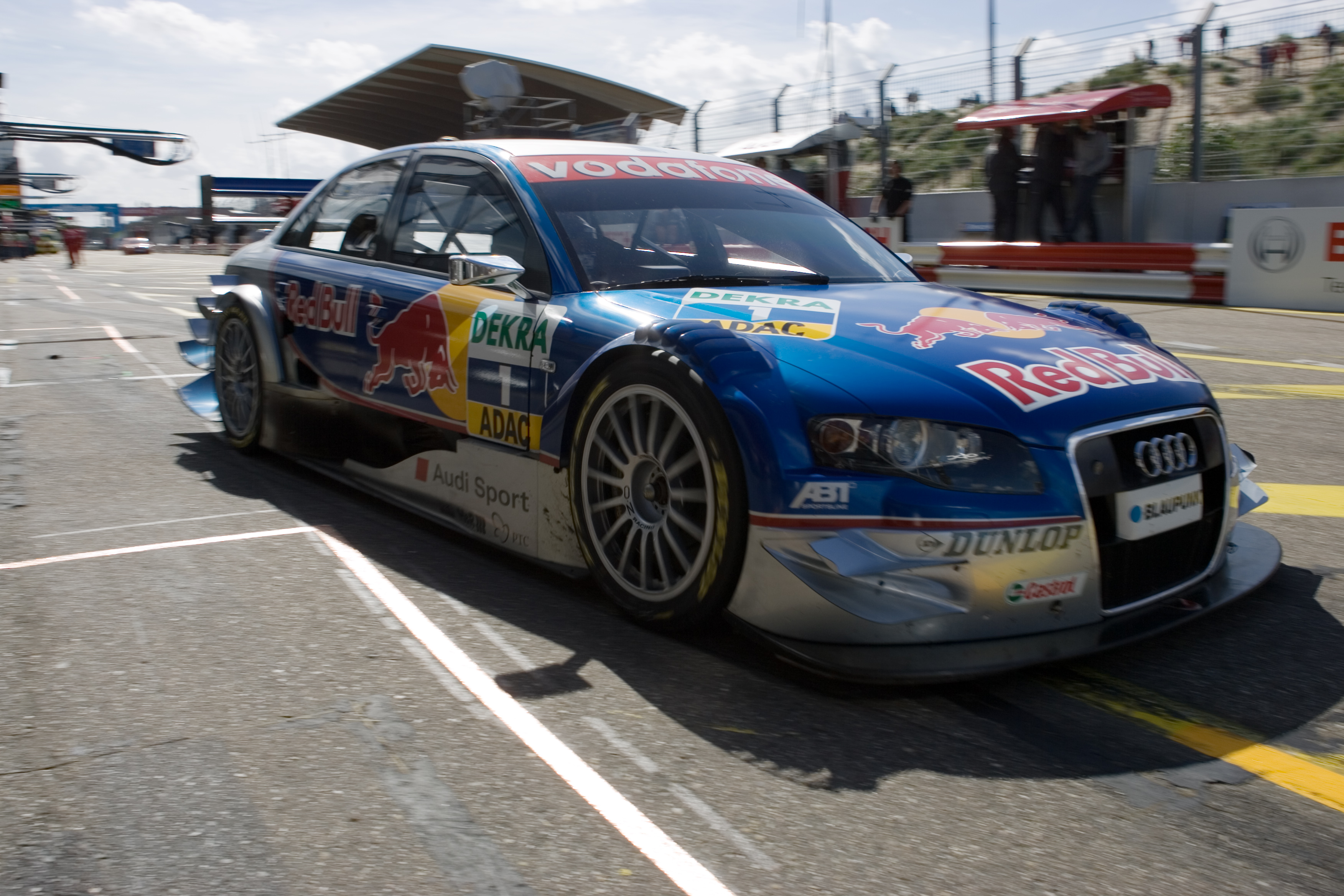
2005 R12 (Mattias Ekström)

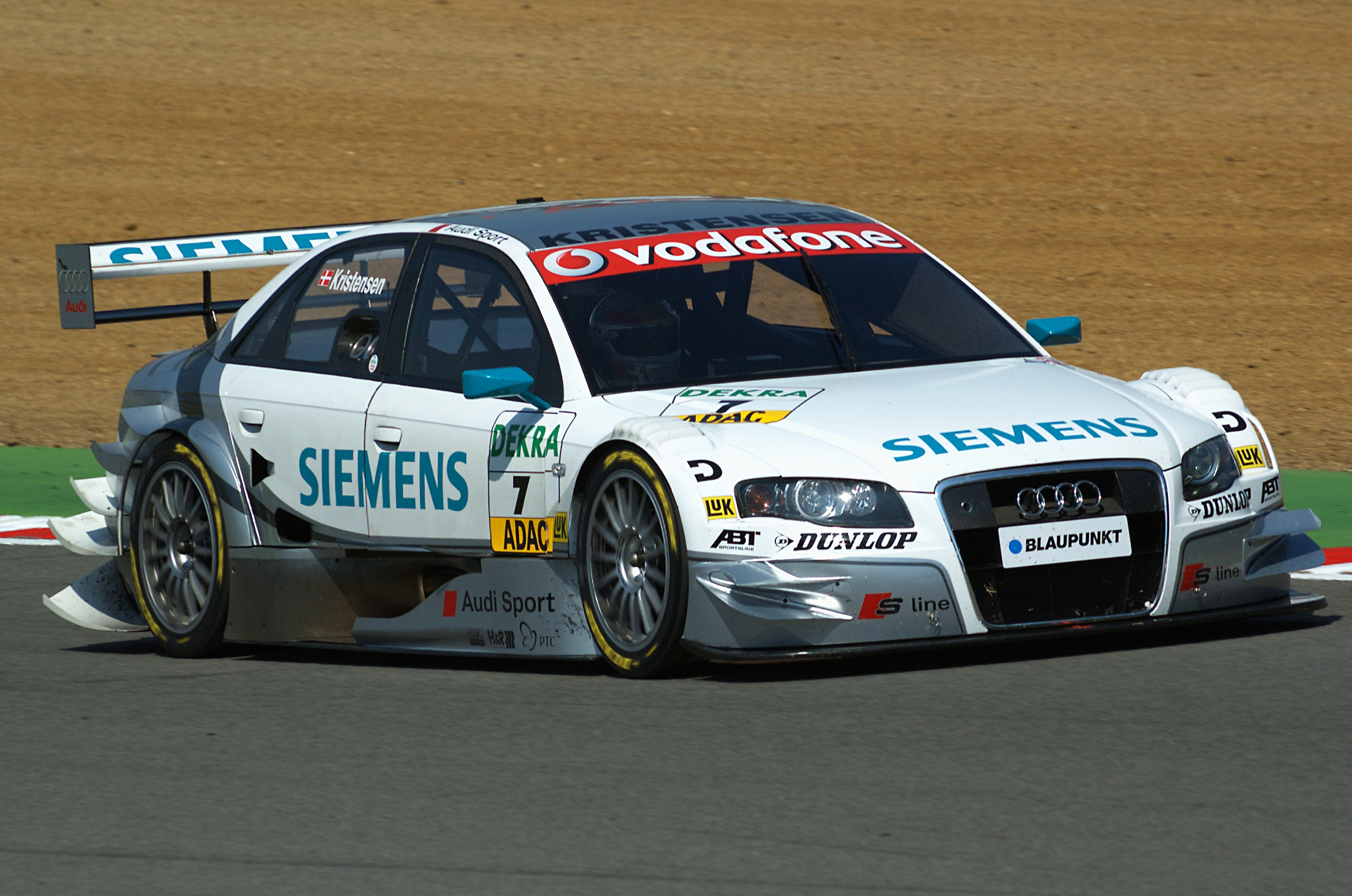
2006 R12 plus (Tom Kristensen)

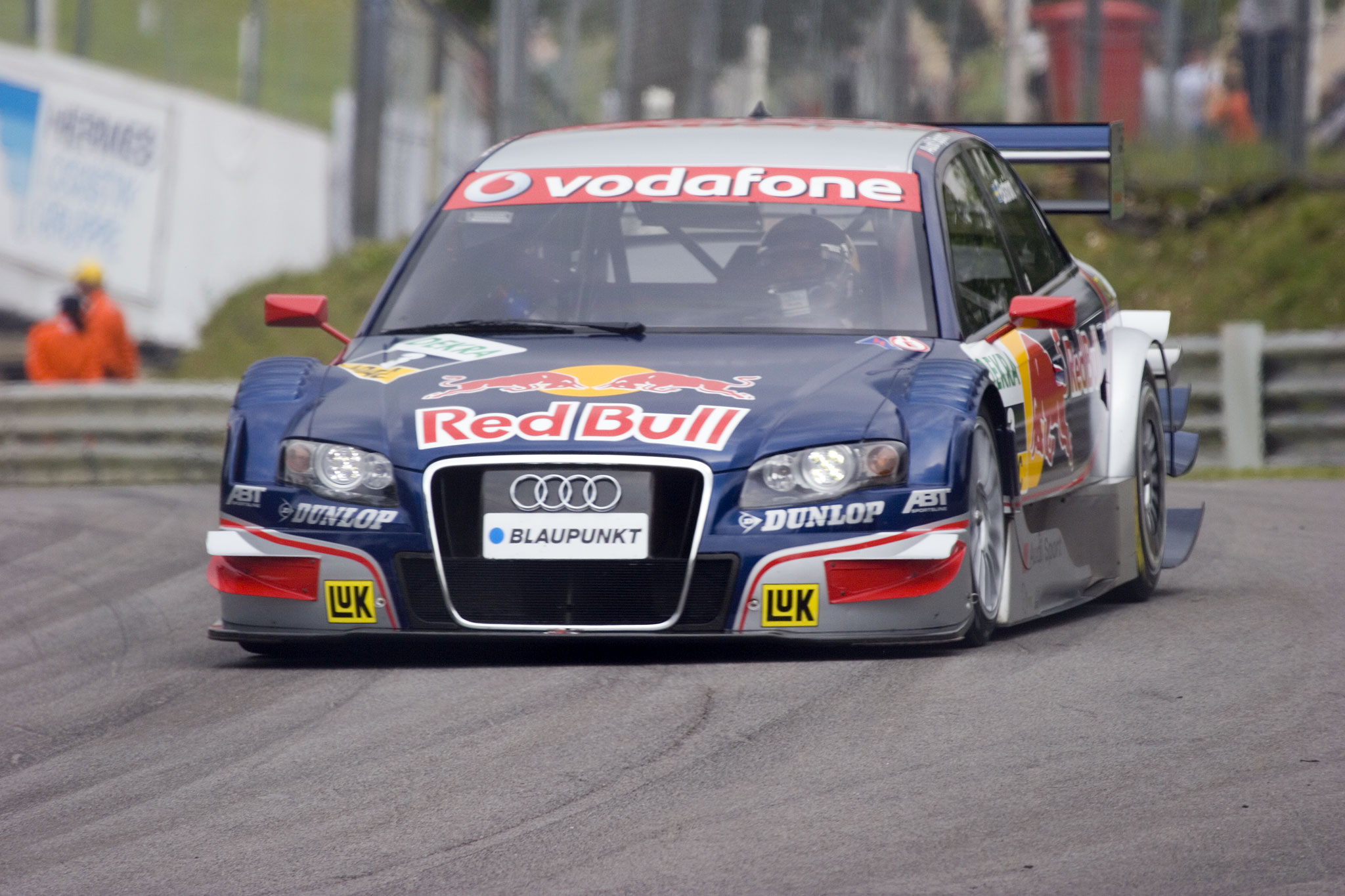
2007 R13 (Mattias Ekström)

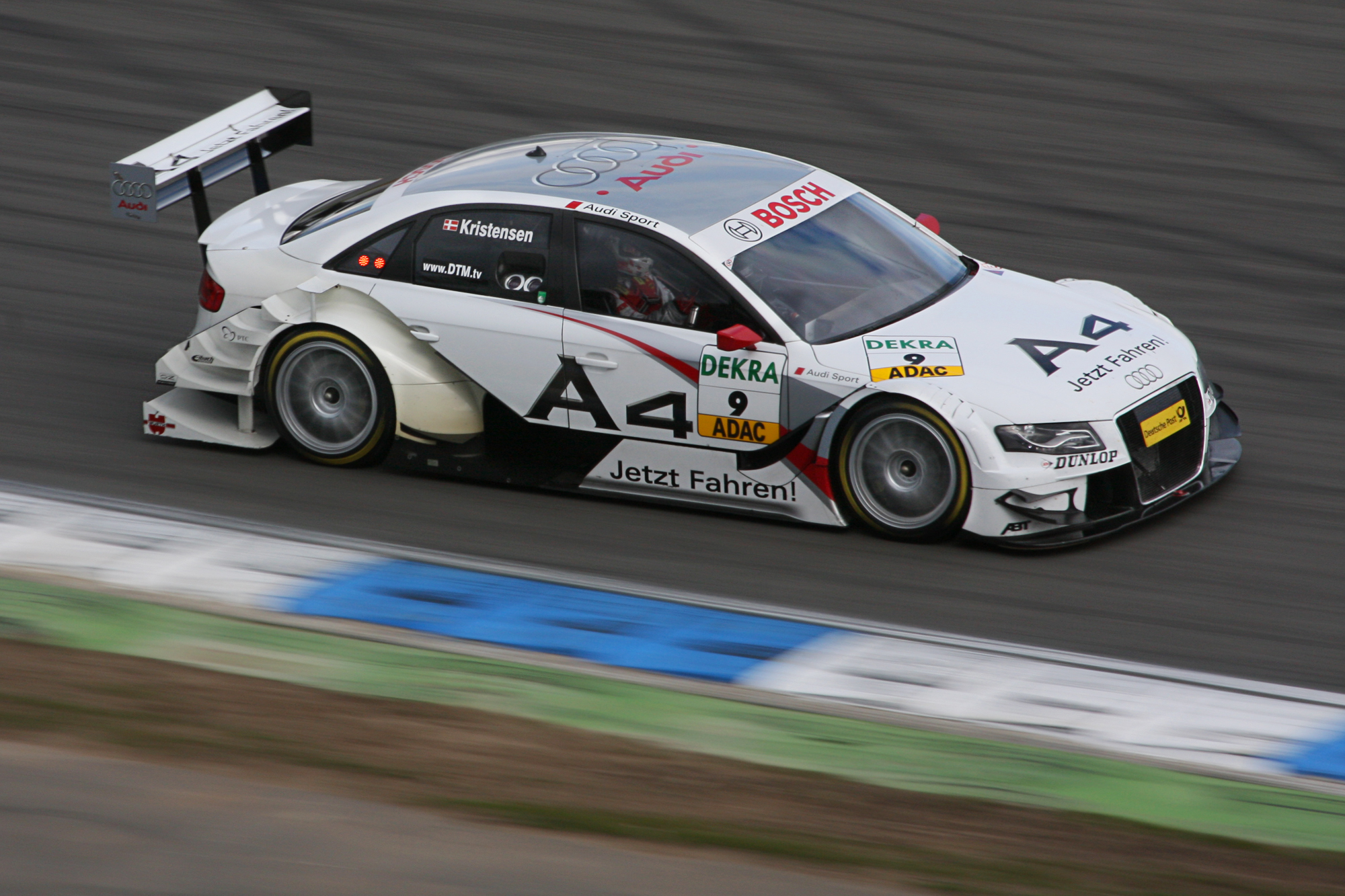
2008 R14 (Tom Kristensen)

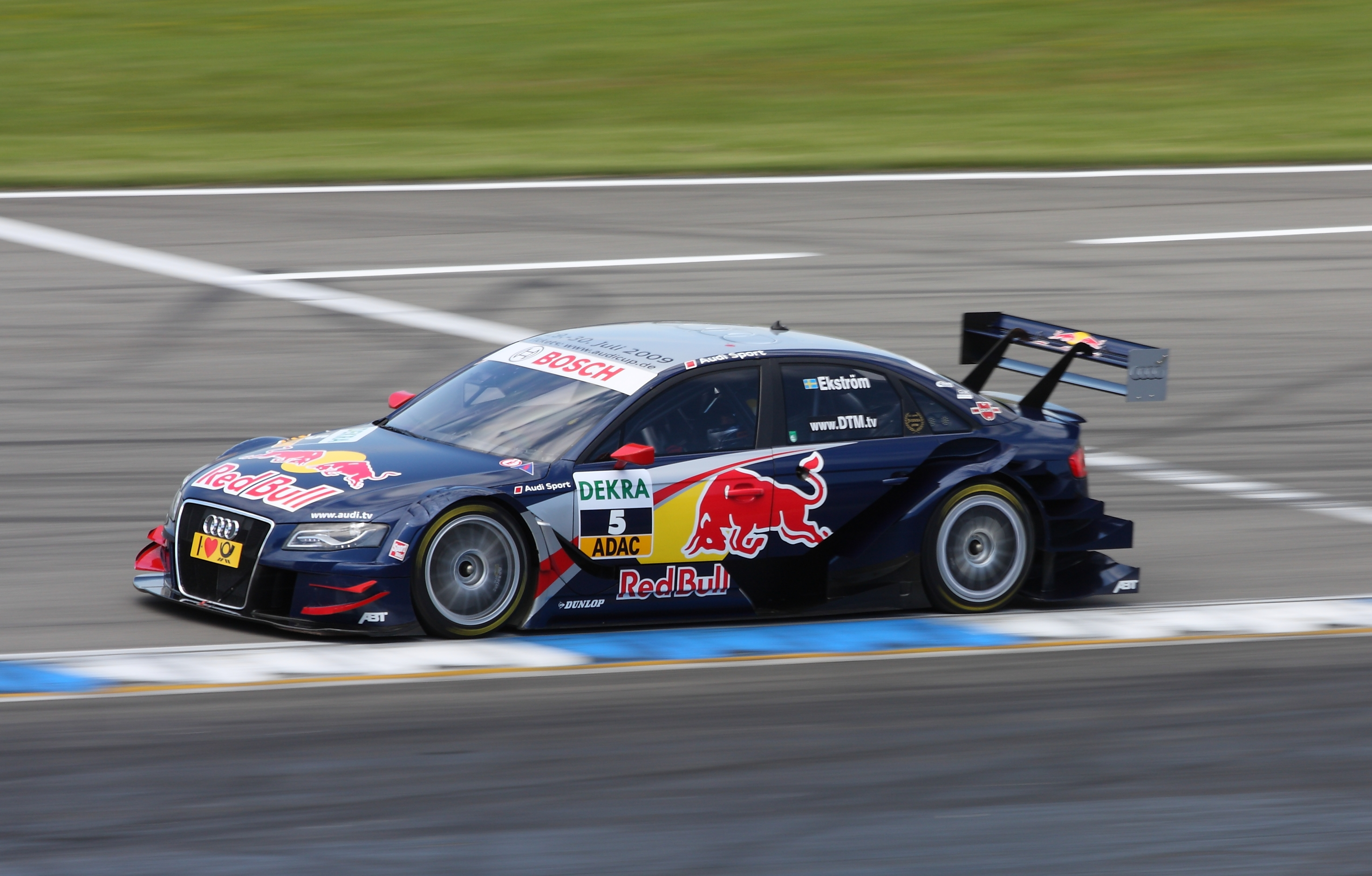
2009 R14 plus (Mattias Ekström)

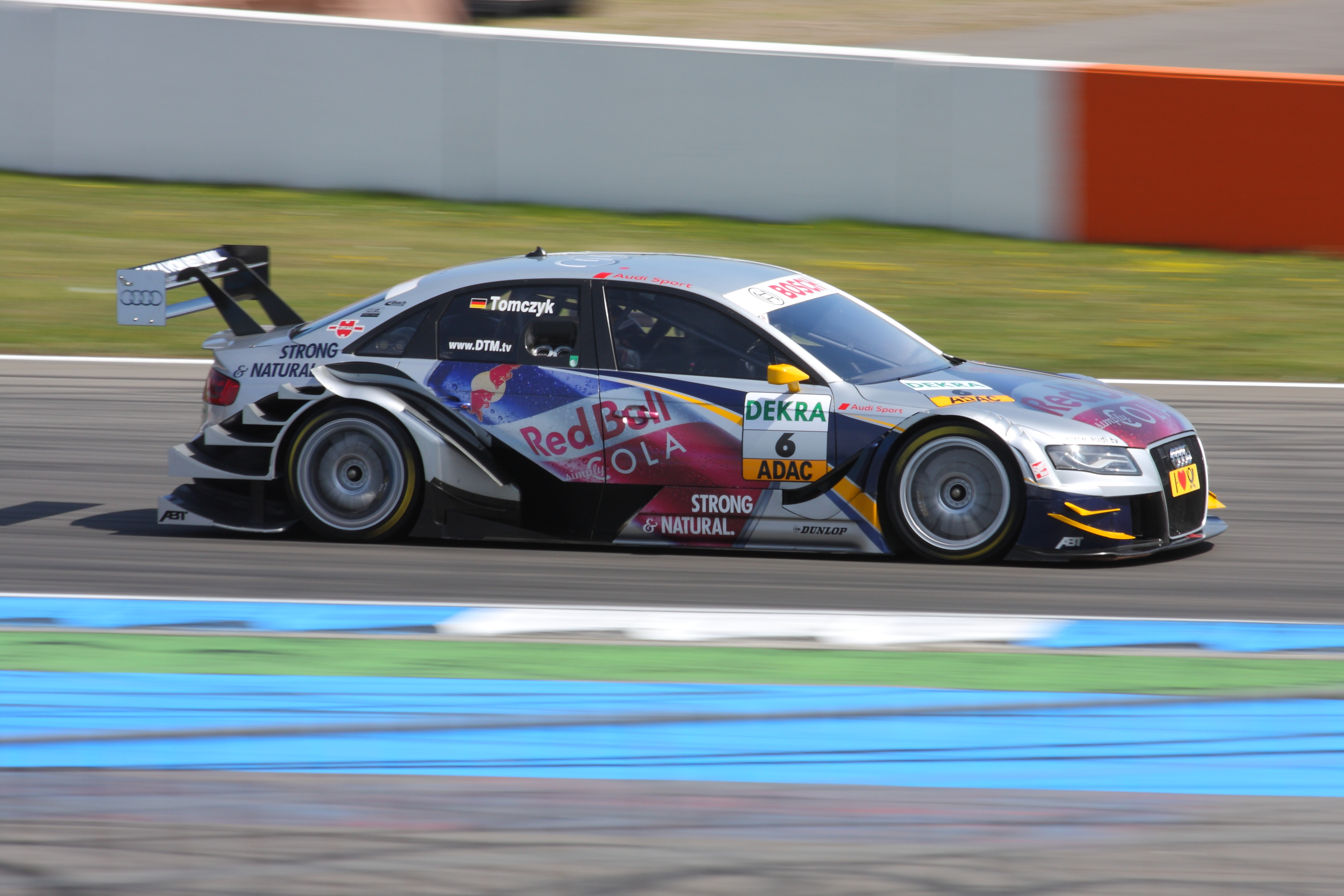
2010 R14 plus (Martin Tomczyk)

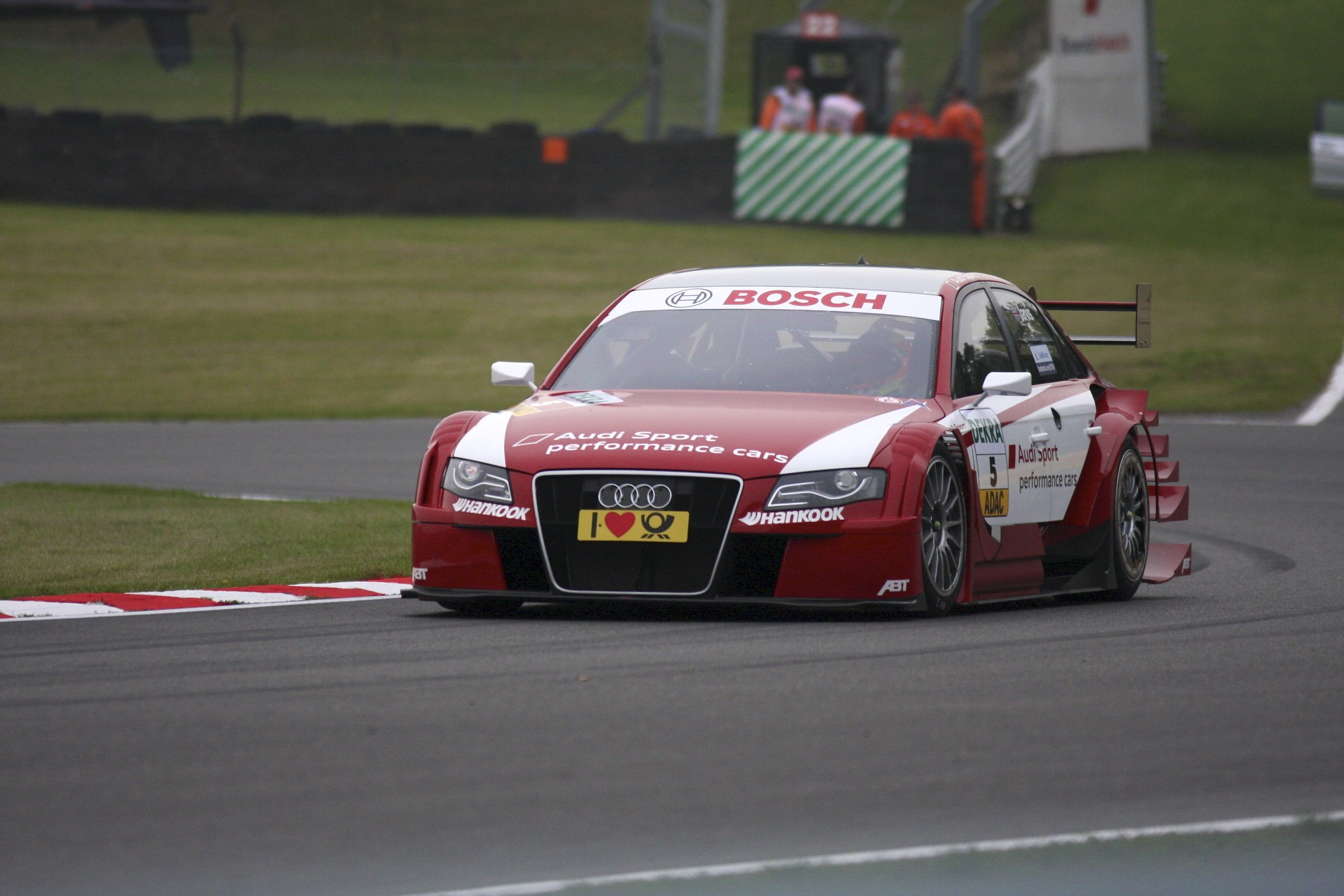
2011 R14 plus (Oliver Jarvis)
