= 2008 Deutsche Tourenwagen Masters =

German motorsport season

Champions
- Drivers' Champion: Timo Scheider
- Teams' Champion: HWA Team I

Seasons
- ← 2007 2009 →

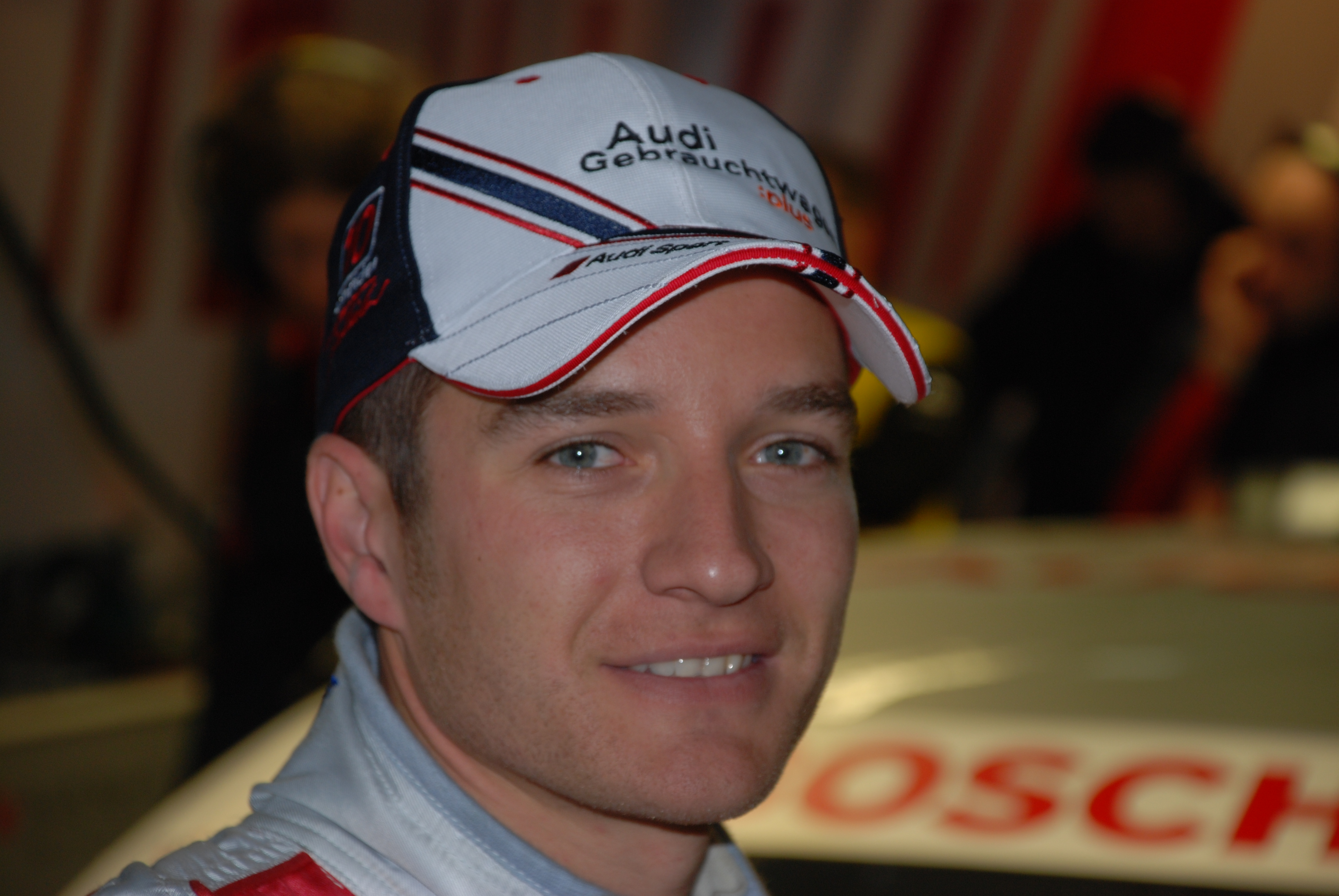
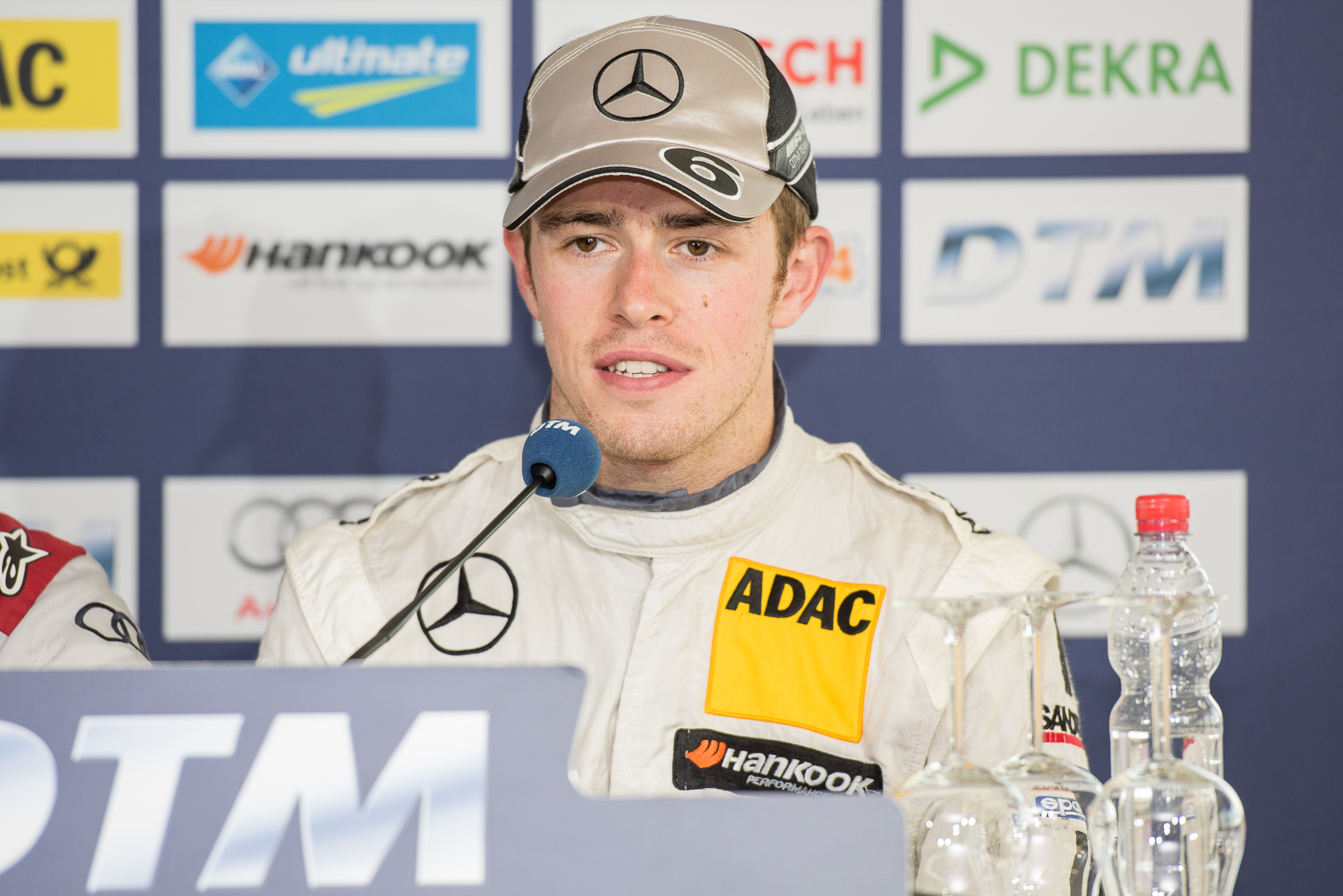
Timo Scheider won his first Deutsche Tourenwagen Masters Drivers' Championship while Paul di Resta (right) finished second in the championship.

The 2008 Deutsche Tourenwagen Masters was the twenty-second season of premier German touring car championship and also ninth season under the moniker of Deutsche Tourenwagen Masters since the series' resumption in 2000. The series began on 13 April at the Hockenheimring and finished on 26 October at the same venue, after eleven rounds. Timo Scheider won the title, having never previously won a race before the start of the season.

== Teams and drivers ==
The following manufacturers, teams and drivers competed in the 2008 Deutsche Tourenwagen Masters. All teams competed with tyres supplied by Dunlop.

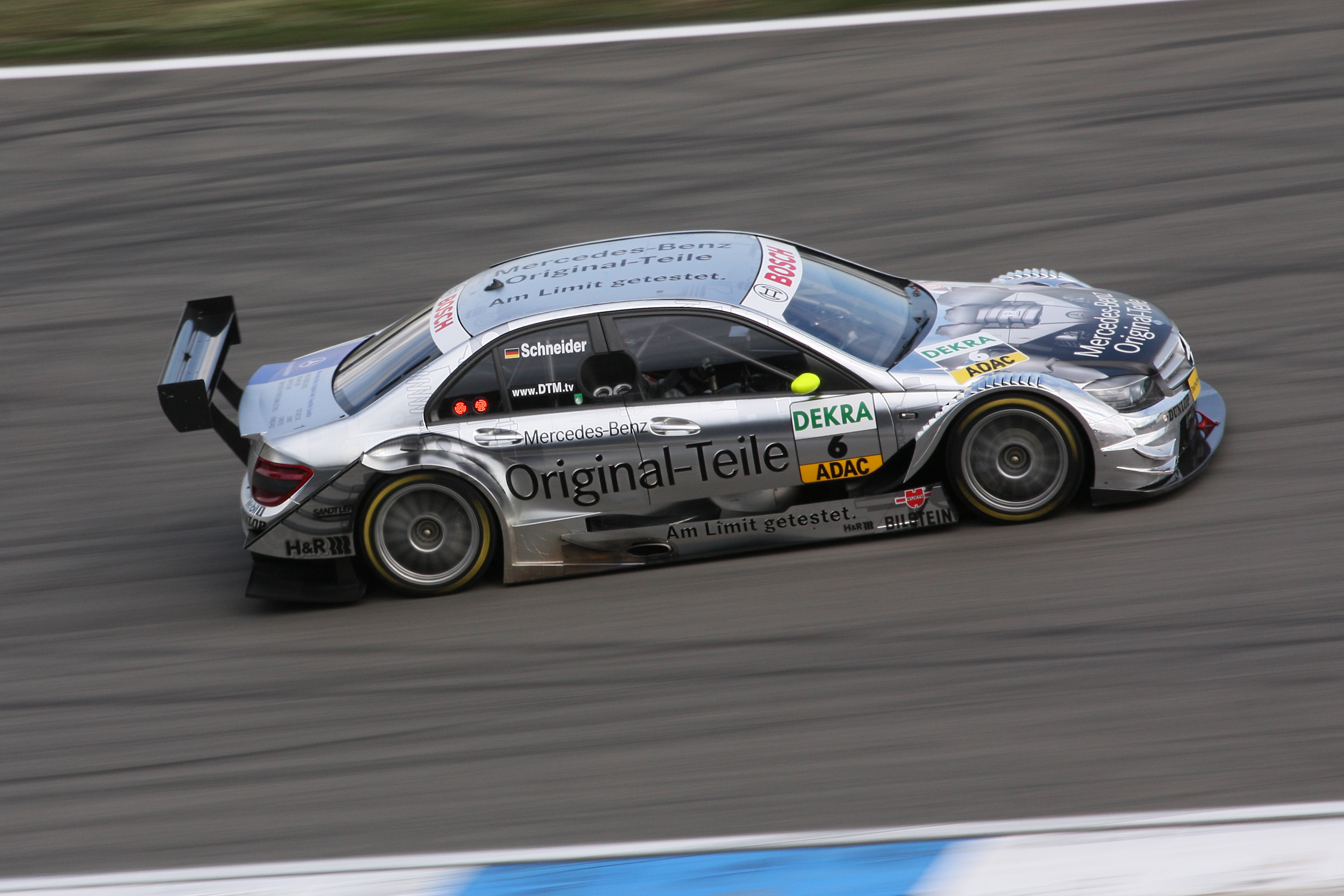
DTM-Mercedes C-Class (W204) of season 2008

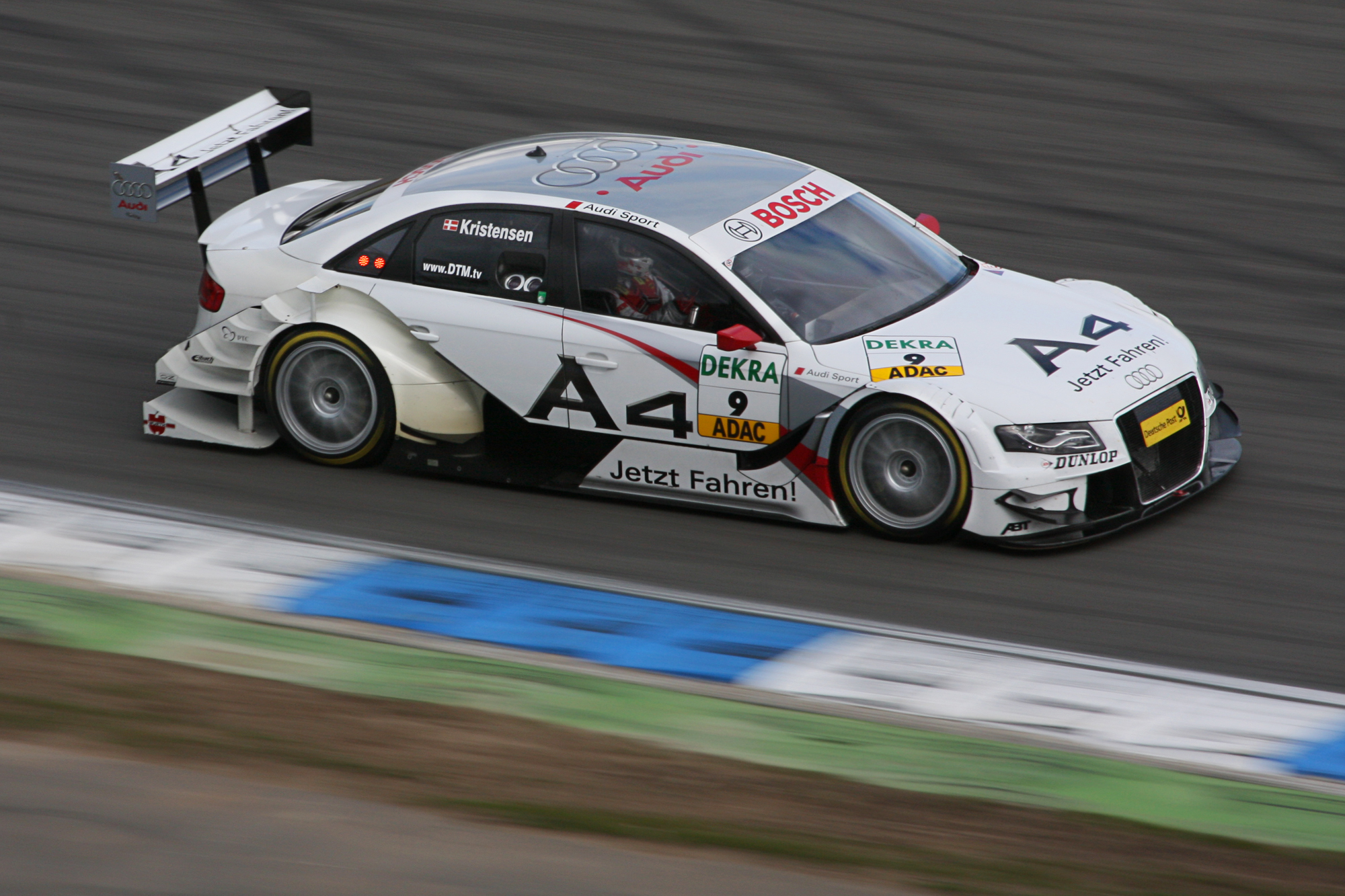
DTM-Audi A4 of season 2008

| Manufacturer | Car | Team | No. | Drivers | Rounds |
|---|---|---|---|---|---|
| Audi | Audi A4 DTM 2008 | Abt Sportsline | 1 | (Sweden) Mattias Ekström | All |
| Audi | Audi A4 DTM 2008 | Abt Sportsline | 2 | (Germany) Martin Tomczyk | All |
| Audi | Audi A4 DTM 2008 | Abt Sportsline | 9 | (Denmark) Tom Kristensen | All |
| Audi | Audi A4 DTM 2008 | Abt Sportsline | 10 | (Germany) Timo Scheider | All |
| Audi | Audi A4 DTM 2007 | Team Phoenix | 14 | (France) Alexandre Prémat | All |
| Audi | Audi A4 DTM 2007 | Team Phoenix | 15 | (United Kingdom) Oliver Jarvis | All |
| Audi | Audi A4 DTM 2007 | Team Rosberg | 18 | (Germany) Mike Rockenfeller | All |
| Audi | Audi A4 DTM 2007 | Team Rosberg | 19 | (Germany) Markus Winkelhock | All |
| Audi | Audi A4 DTM 2006 | Futurecom TME | 20 | (United Kingdom) Katherine Legge | All |
| Audi | Audi A4 DTM 2006 | Futurecom TME | 21 | (Netherlands) Christijan Albers | All |
| Mercedes-Benz | AMG-Mercedes C-Klasse 2008 | HWA Team | 3 | (Canada) Bruno Spengler | All |
| Mercedes-Benz | AMG-Mercedes C-Klasse 2008 | HWA Team | 4 | (United Kingdom) Paul di Resta | All |
| Mercedes-Benz | AMG-Mercedes C-Klasse 2008 | HWA Team | 5 | (United Kingdom) Jamie Green | All |
| Mercedes-Benz | AMG-Mercedes C-Klasse 2008 | HWA Team | 6 | (Germany) Bernd Schneider | All |
| Mercedes-Benz | AMG-Mercedes C-Klasse 2007 | Persson Motorsport | 7 | (United Kingdom) Gary Paffett | All |
| Mercedes-Benz | AMG-Mercedes C-Klasse 2007 | Persson Motorsport | 8 | (Austria) Mathias Lauda | All |
| Mercedes-Benz | AMG-Mercedes C-Klasse 2007 | Persson Motorsport | 16 | (United Kingdom) Susie Stoddart | All |
| Mercedes-Benz | AMG-Mercedes C-Klasse 2007 | Mücke Motorsport | 11 | (Germany) Ralf Schumacher | All |
| Mercedes-Benz | AMG-Mercedes C-Klasse 2007 | Mücke Motorsport | 12 | (Germany) Maro Engel | All |

=== Team changes ===
After competing with three cars in 2007, Mücke Motorsport downsized to two cars for 2008, meaning that there would now be 19 cars on the grid.

=== Driver changes ===
Mika Häkkinen retired from motorsport at the end of the 2007 season. He was replaced at HWA Team by Paul di Resta who had driven for Persson Motorsport the previous season.

Alexandros Margaritis left the series due to his dissatisfaction with competing in year-old cars.

After 11 years in Formula One, Ralf Schumacher would make his DTM debut with Mücke Motorsport after leaving the Toyota F1 Team at the end of the previous season.

After spending 2007 as a reserve driver in Formula 1 and the DTM, Markus Winkelhock became an Audi factory driver and replaced Lucas Luhr at Team Rosberg who left the series to focus on Endurance racing.

Newly signed Mercedes factory driver Maro Engel joined the series with Mücke Motorsport after finishing runner up in the British Formula 3 championship in 2006.

Christian Abt left the DTM after eight seasons to join the Porsche Carrera Cup Germany. He was replaced by 2007 Macau Grand Prix winner Oliver Jarvis.

Christijan Albers returned to the DTM with Futurecom TME after spending the previous three seasons in Formula 1.

Champ Car World Series driver Katherine Legge joined the DTM with Futurecom TME, replacing Vanina Ickx who left the series.

Mathias Lauda and Susie Stoddart moved from Mücke Motorsport to Persson Motorsport.

Daniel La Rosa left the series after two seasons in the DTM.

== Race calendar and winners ==
| Round | Circuit | Date | Pole position | Fastest Lap | Winning driver | Winning team | Winning manufacturer |
|---|---|---|---|---|---|---|---|
| | (Germany) Präsentation Düsseldorf | 6 April | no race | | | | |
| 1 | (Germany) Hockenheimring | 13 April | (Germany) Timo Scheider | (United Kingdom) Paul di Resta | (Sweden) Mattias Ekström | Audi Sport Team Abt Sportsline | Audi |
| 2 | (Germany) Oschersleben | 20 April | (Germany) Timo Scheider | (Germany) Timo Scheider | (Germany) Timo Scheider | Audi Sport Team Abt | Audi |
| 3 | (Italy) Mugello | 4 May | (Germany) Timo Scheider | (United Kingdom) Jamie Green | (United Kingdom) Jamie Green | Salzgitter AMG Mercedes | Mercedes |
| 4 | (Germany) EuroSpeedway | 18 May | (United Kingdom) Paul di Resta | (United Kingdom) Paul di Resta | (United Kingdom) Paul di Resta | Mercedes-Benz Bank AMG | Mercedes |
| 5 | (Germany) Norisring | 29 June | (Canada) Bruno Spengler | (Canada) Bruno Spengler | (United Kingdom) Jamie Green | Salzgitter AMG Mercedes | Mercedes |
| 6 | (Netherlands) Zandvoort | 13 July | (Sweden) Mattias Ekström | (Denmark) Tom Kristensen | (Sweden) Mattias Ekström | Audi Sport Team Abt Sportsline | Audi |
| 7 | (Germany) Nürburgring Short | 27 July | (Denmark) Tom Kristensen | (Germany) Martin Tomczyk | (Germany) Bernd Schneider | Original-Teile AMG Mercedes | Mercedes |
| 8 | (United Kingdom) Brands Hatch Indy | 31 August | (Germany) Timo Scheider | (Germany) Timo Scheider | (Germany) Timo Scheider | Audi Sport Team Abt | Audi |
| 9 | (Spain) Catalunya Short | 21 September | (Germany) Bernd Schneider | (Denmark) Tom Kristensen | (United Kingdom) Paul di Resta | Mercedes-Benz Bank AMG | Mercedes |
| 10 | (France) Le Mans Bugatti | 5 October | (Denmark) Tom Kristensen | (United Kingdom) Paul di Resta | (Sweden) Mattias Ekström | Audi Sport Team Abt Sportsline | Audi |
| 11 | (Germany) Hockenheimring | 26 October | (Sweden) Mattias Ekström | (United Kingdom) Paul di Resta | (Germany) Timo Scheider | Audi Sport Team Abt | Audi |

== Season standings ==
=== Scoring system ===
Points are awarded to the top eight finishers.

| Position | 1st | 2nd | 3rd | 4th | 5th | 6th | 7th | 8th |
|---|---|---|---|---|---|---|---|---|
| Points | 10 | 8 | 6 | 5 | 4 | 3 | 2 | 1 |

=== Drivers' standings ===
| Pos | Driver | HOC (Germany) | OSC (Germany) | MUG (Italy) | LAU (Germany) | NOR (Germany) | ZAN (Netherlands) | NÜR (Germany) | BRH (United Kingdom) | CAT (Spain) | BUG (France) | HOC (Germany) | Pts |
|---|---|---|---|---|---|---|---|---|---|---|---|---|---|
| 1 | (Germany) Timo Scheider | 2 | 1 | 10 | 2 | 3 | 2 | 5 | 1 | 2 | 6 | 1 | 75 |
| 2 | (United Kingdom) Paul di Resta | 13 | 4 | 2 | 1 | 5 | 7 | 2 | 2 | 1 | 2 | 2 | 71 |
| 3 | (Sweden) Mattias Ekström | 1 | 8 | 6 | 3 | 4 | 1 | 6 | 3 | DSQ | 1 | 7 | 56 |
| 4 | (United Kingdom) Jamie Green | 6 | 5 | 1 | 5 | 1 | 6 | 3 | 4 | 8 | 10 | 3 | 52 |
| 5 | (Canada) Bruno Spengler | 4 | 3 | 9 | 6 | 2 | 5 | 7 | 6 | Ret | 7 | 4 | 38 |
| 6 | (Germany) Bernd Schneider | 8 | 12 | 4 | 7 | 6 | 9 | 1 | 9 | 3 | 5 | 6 | 34 |
| 7 | (Germany) Martin Tomczyk | 5 | 2 | 17 | 4 | Ret | 4 | Ret | 5 | 4 | Ret | 8 | 32 |
| 8 | (Denmark) Tom Kristensen | 3 | 19† | 3 | 16 | 7 | 3 | Ret | 7 | 13 | 8 | 5 | 27 |
| 9 | (United Kingdom) Gary Paffett | 7 | 11 | 12 | 10 | DSQ | 11 | 4 | 8 | 11 | 4 | 11 | 13 |
| 10 | (France) Alexandre Prémat | 11 | 9 | 8 | DSQ | 14 | Ret | 14 | 10 | 6 | 3 | 13 | 10 |
| 11 | (Germany) Mike Rockenfeller | 10 | 7 | 14 | 9 | 13 | 10 | 15 | 13 | 5 | 9 | 9 | 6 |
| 12 | (Germany) Markus Winkelhock | 12 | 6 | 7 | Ret | 11 | 8 | 9 | 11 | 12 | 11 | Ret | 6 |
| 13 | (United Kingdom) Oliver Jarvis | 9 | 15 | 5 | 8 | 12 | 17† | 13 | 12 | 9 | Ret | 10 | 5 |
| 14 | (Germany) Ralf Schumacher | 14 | 10 | Ret | 13 | 16† | 12 | 8 | 15 | 7 | Ret | 14 | 3 |
| 15 | (Austria) Mathias Lauda | 15 | 13 | 16 | 12 | 8 | 13 | 10 | 16 | Ret | 15 | Ret | 1 |
| 16 | (Germany) Maro Engel | 17 | 18† | 11 | 11 | 9 | 14 | Ret | 17 | 15 | 14 | 12 | 0 |
| 17 | (Netherlands) Christijan Albers | Ret | 16 | 13 | 14 | Ret | Ret | 11 | 14 | 10 | 13 | Ret | 0 |
| 18 | (United Kingdom) Susie Stoddart | 16 | 14 | 15 | 17† | 10 | 15 | 12 | 19 | Ret | 12 | Ret | 0 |
| 19 | (United Kingdom) Katherine Legge | 18 | 17 | 18 | 15 | 15 | 16† | Ret | 18 | Ret | 16 | NC | 0 |
| Pos | Driver | HOC (Germany) | OSC (Germany) | MUG (Italy) | LAU (Germany) | NOR (Germany) | ZAN (Netherlands) | NÜR (Germany) | BRH (United Kingdom) | CAT (Spain) | BUG (France) | HOC (Germany) | Pts |

| Colour | Result |
|---|---|
| Gold | Winner |
| Silver | Second place |
| Bronze | Third place |
| Green | Points classification |
| Blue | Non-points classification |
| Blue | Non-classified finish (NC) |
| Purple | Retired, not classified (Ret) |
| Red | Did not qualify (DNQ) |
| Red | Did not pre-qualify (DNPQ) |
| Black | Disqualified (DSQ) |
| White | Did not start (DNS) |
| White | Withdrew (WD) |
| White | Race cancelled (C) |
| Blank | Did not practice (DNP) |
| Blank | Did not arrive (DNA) |
| Blank | Excluded (EX) |

- † — Driver retired, but was classified as they completed 90% of the winner's race distance.

Notes:

- In the ninth round of the championship in Catalunya Ekström originally crossed the line 5th and Green 8th. However, due to an overly harsh duel between the two on the last lap the stewards penalized both men. Ekström was disqualified and Green was given a 30 seconds’ time penalty. As Ekström already had caught the attention of the stewards in a negative way during the race, his penalty was bigger.

=== Teams' championship ===
| Pos. | Team | No. | HOC (Germany) | OSC (Germany) | MUG (Italy) | LAU (Germany) | NOR (Germany) | ZAN (Netherlands) | NÜR (Germany) | BRH (United Kingdom) | CAT (Spain) | BUG (France) | HOC (Germany) | Points |
|---|---|---|---|---|---|---|---|---|---|---|---|---|---|---|
| 1 | Mercedes-Benz Bank AMG | 3 | 4 | 3 | 9 | 6 | 2 | 5 | 7 | 6 | Ret | 7 | 4 | 109 |
| 1 | Mercedes-Benz Bank AMG | 4 | 13 | 4 | 2 | 1 | 5 | 7 | 2 | 2 | 1 | 2 | 2 | 109 |
| 2 | Audi Sport Team Abt | 9 | 3 | 19† | 3 | 16 | 7 | 3 | Ret | 7 | 13 | 8 | 5 | 102 |
| 2 | Audi Sport Team Abt | 10 | 2 | 1 | 10 | 2 | 3 | 2 | 5 | 1 | 2 | 6 | 1 | 102 |
| 3 | Audi Sport Team Abt Sportsline | 1 | 1 | 8 | 6 | 3 | 4 | 1 | 6 | 3 | DSQ | 1 | 7 | 88 |
| 3 | Audi Sport Team Abt Sportsline | 2 | 5 | 2 | 17 | 4 | Ret | 4 | Ret | 5 | 4 | Ret | 8 | 88 |
| 4 | Salzgitter / Original-Teile AMG Mercedes | 5 | 6 | 5 | 1 | 5 | 1 | 6 | 3 | 4 | 8 | 10 | 3 | 86 |
| 4 | Salzgitter / Original-Teile AMG Mercedes | 6 | 8 | 12 | 4 | 7 | 6 | 9 | 1 | 9 | 3 | 5 | 6 | 86 |
| 5 | Audi Sport Team Phoenix | 14 | 11 | 9 | 8 | DSQ | 14 | Ret | 14 | 10 | 6 | 3 | 13 | 15 |
| 5 | Audi Sport Team Phoenix | 15 | 9 | 15 | 5 | 8 | 12 | 17† | 13 | 12 | 9 | Ret | 10 | 15 |
| 6 | Stern / Pixum AMG Mercedes | 7 | 7 | 11 | 12 | 10 | DSQ | 11 | 4 | 8 | 11 | 4 | 11 | 14 |
| 6 | Stern / Pixum AMG Mercedes | 8 | 15 | 13 | 16 | 12 | 8 | 13 | 10 | 16 | Ret | 15 | Ret | 14 |
| 7 | Audi Sport Team Rosberg | 18 | 10 | 7 | 14 | 9 | 13 | 10 | 15 | 13 | 5 | 9 | 9 | 12 |
| 7 | Audi Sport Team Rosberg | 19 | 12 | 6 | 7 | Ret | 11 | 8 | 9 | 11 | 12 | 11 | Ret | 12 |
| 8 | TRILUX / JungeSterne AMG Mercedes | 11 | 14 | 10 | Ret | 13 | 16† | 12 | 8 | 15 | 7 | Ret | 14 | 3 |
| 8 | TRILUX / JungeSterne AMG Mercedes | 12 | 17 | 18† | 11 | 11 | 9 | 14 | Ret | 17 | 15 | 14 | 12 | 3 |
| 9 | TV Spielfilm AMG Mercedes | 16 | 16 | 14 | 15 | 17† | 10 | 15 | 12 | 19 | Ret | 12 | Ret | 0 |
| 10 | Futurecom TME | 20 | 18 | 17 | 18 | 15 | 15 | 16† | Ret | 18 | Ret | 16 | NC | 0 |
| 10 | Futurecom TME | 21 | Ret | 16 | 13 | 14 | Ret | Ret | 11 | 14 | 10 | 13 | Ret | 0 |
| Pos. | Team | No. | HOC (Germany) | OSC (Germany) | MUG (Italy) | LAU (Germany) | NOR (Germany) | ZAN (Netherlands) | NÜR (Germany) | BRH (United Kingdom) | CAT (Spain) | BUG (France) | HOC (Germany) | Points |

== Bibliography ==
- Voigt, Thomas (2008). DTM Jahrbuch 2008: Das offizielle Buch der DTM (in German). Königswinter: Heel Verlag. ISBN 978-3-89880-945-0.
- Schröder, Torben (November 2008). Tourenwagen Story 2008 (in German). Saint Vith: Adrenalin Verlag. ISBN 978-3-940672-13-1.
