= 2010 Deutsche Tourenwagen Masters =

German touring car championship

Champions
- Drivers' Champion: Paul di Resta
- Teams' Champion: HWA Team I

Seasons
- ← 2009 2011 →

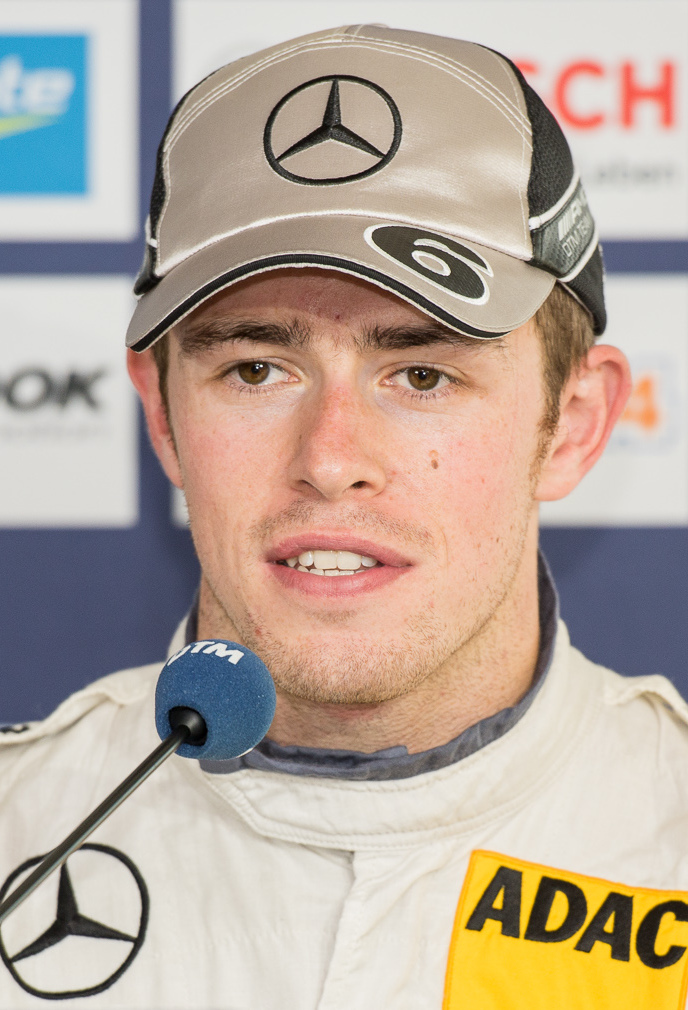
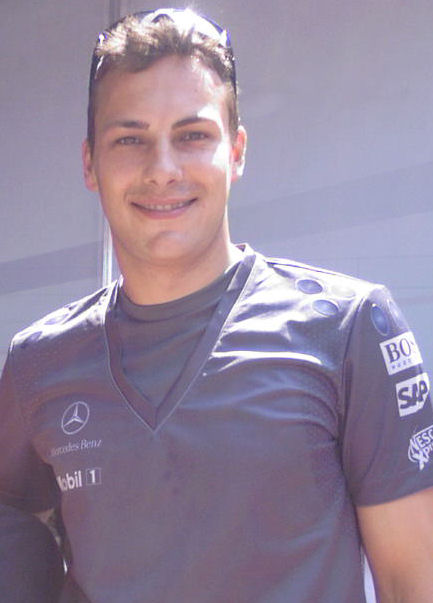
Paul di Resta (left) won his first Deutsche Tourenwagen Masters Drivers' Championship, shortly before announcing his move to Formula One in 2011 while Gary Paffett (right) finished second in the championship.

The 2010 Deutsche Tourenwagen Masters was the twenty-fourth season of premier German touring car championship and also eleventh season under the moniker of Deutsche Tourenwagen Masters (DTM) since the series' resumption in 2000. The season began on 25 April at the Hockenheimring, and ended on 28 November at the Shanghai Street Circuit, after eleven rounds held in Germany, Spain, the Netherlands, the United Kingdom, Italy and China. Having finished second in 2008 and third in 2009, HWA Team's Paul di Resta became champion for the first time, having come out on top of a three-way title battle in Shanghai.

The 2010 season would be Dunlop's final season as the sole tyre supplier in DTM as the company announced on 19 November 2010 that it would not renew its contract at the end of the season. After several months of deliberation, Hankook was chosen as the tyre supplier for the 2011 season.

== Season summary ==
Di Resta had trailed teammate Bruno Spengler – a race winner at Lausitz and the Nürburgring – by as many as fifteen points after four races, but by the ninth race, di Resta had taken the championship lead after five top-two finishes including three wins. A poor finish for di Resta at Adria – ninth after being helped into spins by Audi drivers Mike Rockenfeller and Miguel Molina – coupled with Spengler's third place allowed the Canadian driver to take a three-point lead into the final race. Another HWA driver, 2005 season champion Gary Paffett remained in mathematical contention, succeeding in needing a top-two finish at Adria, which left him nine points behind with ten available. Spengler left himself immediately in trouble in Shanghai, crashing during the qualification session which left him 17th on the grid, while di Resta and Paffett lined up on the front row. Spengler could only advance to thirteenth in the race, while his teammates battled for victory. Ultimately, Paffett won the race – ended early due to a collision between Rockenfeller and Susie Stoddart – but di Resta's second place allowed him to take the championship by four points. Paffett's victory also enabled him to overhaul Spengler for second place, by just one point.

Best of the rest went to the defending two-time champion Timo Scheider, who finished as top Audi in fourth place in the championship standings. Scheider, albeit scoring in each of the first five races, struggled for form in the early running, but recovered towards the end of the season and took a single victory during the season, winning at Adria. Mattias Ekström was the only other Audi driver to win a race during the season, winning the series' inaugural race at Valencia but only returned twice to the podium after that; finishing the season in fifth place. Jamie Green was the season's other race-winner, winning for the third season in a row at the Norisring, each of which had been taken in a 2008-specification car. Green finished three points behind Ekström, in sixth place in the points standings.

== Rule changes for 2010 ==
- With the championship undergoing a development freeze until the 2011 season to keep costs down, teams will use 2008 and 2009 cars only.

== Teams and drivers ==
The following manufacturers, teams and drivers competed in the 2010 Deutsche Tourenwagen Masters. All teams competed with tyres supplied by Dunlop.

Manufacturer	Car	Team	No.	Drivers	Rounds
Audi	Audi A4 DTM 2009	Abt Sportsline	1	(Germany) Timo Scheider	All
Audi	Audi A4 DTM 2009	Abt Sportsline	2	(United Kingdom) Oliver Jarvis	All
Audi	Audi A4 DTM 2009	Abt Sportsline	5	(Sweden) Mattias Ekström	All
Audi	Audi A4 DTM 2009	Abt Sportsline	6	(Germany) Martin Tomczyk	All
Audi	Audi A4 DTM 2008	Abt Sportsline	18	(Spain) Miguel Molina	All
Audi	Audi A4 DTM 2008	Team Phoenix	9	(France) Alexandre Prémat	1–10
Audi	Audi A4 DTM 2008	Team Phoenix	9	(Hong Kong) Darryl O'Young	11
Audi	Audi A4 DTM 2008	Team Phoenix	10	(Germany) Mike Rockenfeller	All
Audi	Audi A4 DTM 2008	Team Rosberg	14	(Germany) Markus Winkelhock	All
Audi	Audi A4 DTM 2008	Team Rosberg	15	(United Kingdom) Katherine Legge	All
Mercedes-Benz	AMG-Mercedes C-Klasse 2009	HWA Team	3	(United Kingdom) Gary Paffett	All
Mercedes-Benz	AMG-Mercedes C-Klasse 2009	HWA Team	4	(Canada) Bruno Spengler	All
Mercedes-Benz	AMG-Mercedes C-Klasse 2009	HWA Team	7	(United Kingdom) Paul di Resta	All
Mercedes-Benz	AMG-Mercedes C-Klasse 2009	HWA Team	8	(Germany) Ralf Schumacher	All
Mercedes-Benz	AMG-Mercedes C-Klasse 2008	Persson Motorsport	11	(United Kingdom) Jamie Green	All
Mercedes-Benz	AMG-Mercedes C-Klasse 2008	Persson Motorsport	12	(United Kingdom) Susie Stoddart	All
Mercedes-Benz	AMG-Mercedes C-Klasse 2008	Persson Motorsport	21	(China) Congfu Cheng	All
Mercedes-Benz	AMG-Mercedes C-Klasse 2008	Mücke Motorsport	16	(Germany) Maro Engel	All
Mercedes-Benz	AMG-Mercedes C-Klasse 2008	Mücke Motorsport	17	(United Kingdom) David Coulthard	All

=== Team changes ===
- After the string of poor results since 2006, the Privateer team Kolles Futurecom officially shut down from the series and thus Audi scaled-down its operational fleet from 12 to 9 cars.

=== Driver changes ===
Changed Teams

- Oliver Jarvis: Team Phoenix → Abt Sportsline
- Katherine Legge: Abt Sportsline → Team Rosberg
- Mike Rockenfeller: Team Rosberg → Team Phoenix

Entering DTM

- Congfu Cheng: A1 Grand Prix (A1 Team China) → Persson Motorsport
- David Coulthard: Sabbatical → Mücke Motorsport
- Miguel Molina: Formula Renault 3.5 Series (Ultimate Motorsport) → Abt Sportsline
- Darryl O'Young: World Touring Car Championship (bamboo-engineering) → Team Phoenix

Leaving DTM

- Christian Bakkerud: Kolles Futurecom-TME → 24 Hours of Le Mans (Kolles)
- Tomáš Kostka: Kolles Futurecom-BRT → Auto GP (Charouz-Gravity Racing)
- Tom Kristensen: Abt Sportsline → DTM retirement; Sportscars only.
- Mathias Lauda: Mücke Motorsport → Porsche Supercup (Porsche)
- Johannes Seidlitz: Kolles Futurecom-BRT → FIA GT3 European Championship (Team Rosberg)

== Race calendar and results ==
- A nine-round calendar was announced on 18 December 2009. This was later expanded to ten races, with the addition of a street race in Shanghai, China that was announced on 28 January 2010. This race closed the season on 28 November. On 15 July 2010, it was announced that an additional round would take place on 31 October at Adria; returning to the circuit which held races in 2003 and 2004.

Round	Circuit	Date	Pole position	Fastest lap	Winning driver	Winning team
1	(Germany) Hockenheimring (GP Circuit)	25 April	(United Kingdom) Gary Paffett	(Canada) Bruno Spengler	(United Kingdom) Gary Paffett	HWA Team
2	(Spain) Circuit Ricardo Tormo, Valencia	23 May	(Sweden) Mattias Ekström	(Sweden) Mattias Ekström	(Sweden) Mattias Ekström	Abt Sportsline
3	(Germany) EuroSpeedway Lausitz	6 June	(United Kingdom) Paul di Resta	(Germany) Mike Rockenfeller	(Canada) Bruno Spengler	HWA Team
4	(Germany) Norisring, Nuremberg	4 July	(Germany) Ralf Schumacher	(Germany) Ralf Schumacher	(United Kingdom) Jamie Green	Persson Motorsport
5	(Germany) Nürburgring	8 August	(Sweden) Mattias Ekström	(Canada) Bruno Spengler	(Canada) Bruno Spengler	HWA Team
6	(Netherlands) Circuit Park Zandvoort	22 August	(Germany) Timo Scheider	(Germany) Timo Scheider	(United Kingdom) Gary Paffett	HWA Team
7	(United Kingdom) Brands Hatch, Kent	5 September	(United Kingdom) Paul di Resta	(Spain) Miguel Molina	(United Kingdom) Paul di Resta	HWA Team
8	(Germany) Motorsport Arena Oschersleben	19 September	(United Kingdom) Paul di Resta	(Germany) Timo Scheider	(United Kingdom) Paul di Resta	HWA Team
9	(Germany) Hockenheimring (National Circuit)	17 October	(Germany) Timo Scheider	(United Kingdom) Paul di Resta	(United Kingdom) Paul di Resta	HWA Team
10	(Italy) Adria International Raceway	31 October	(United Kingdom) Gary Paffett	(Sweden) Mattias Ekström	(Germany) Timo Scheider	Abt Sportsline
11	(China) Shanghai Street Circuit	28 November	(United Kingdom) Paul di Resta	(United Kingdom) David Coulthard	(United Kingdom) Gary Paffett	HWA Team

== Championship standings ==
=== Drivers' championship ===
Pos	Driver	HOC (Germany)	VAL (Spain)	LAU (Germany)	NOR (Germany)	NÜR (Germany)	ZAN (Netherlands)	BRH (United Kingdom)	OSC (Germany)	HOC (Germany)	ADR (Italy)	SHA (China)	Points
1	(United Kingdom) Paul di Resta	4	5	**2**	10	2	2	**1**	**1**	1	9	**2**	71
2	(United Kingdom) Gary Paffett	**1**	7	5	6	3	1	5	4	4	**2**	1	67
3	(Canada) Bruno Spengler	2	2	1	3	1	7	2	2	Ret	3	13	66
4	(Germany) Timo Scheider	7	4	8	5	4	**3**	3	11	**2**	1	3	53
5	(Sweden) Mattias Ekström	6	**1**	Ret	2	**7**	4	Ret	3	Ret	8	9	35
6	(United Kingdom) Jamie Green	3	9	3	1	5	10	10	7	8	12	6	32
7	(Germany) Mike Rockenfeller	5	6	4	12	9	13	9	5	3	16	12	22
8	(Germany) Martin Tomczyk	17†	DSQ	6	8	13	8	7	8	5	6	4	20
9	(United Kingdom) Oliver Jarvis	Ret	14†	11	4	11	6	6	13	6	5	17	18
10	(Spain) Miguel Molina	8	8	13	Ret	14	5	4	Ret	Ret	17†	5	15
11	(France) Alexandre Prémat	10	3	Ret	7	Ret	11	8	6	Ret	Ret		12
12	(Germany) Markus Winkelhock	15	15†	10	Ret	Ret	DNS	15†	Ret	Ret	4	7	7
13	(United Kingdom) Susie Stoddart	11	10	7	15	Ret	15	Ret	10	7	14	11	4
14	(Germany) Ralf Schumacher	9	Ret	9	**11**	6	9	Ret	9	Ret	11	10	3
15	(Germany) Maro Engel	16	11	15	9	8	Ret	11	12	9	7	16	3
16	(United Kingdom) David Coulthard	12	13†	Ret	13	10	12	12	14	Ret	10	8	1
17	(China) Congfu Cheng	13	12	12	14	12	16	13	Ret	Ret	13	15	0
18	(United Kingdom) Katherine Legge	14	DNS	14	16	15	14	14	Ret	Ret	15	14	0
–	(Hong Kong) Darryl O'Young											DNS	0
Pos	Driver	HOC (Germany)	VAL (Spain)	LAU (Germany)	NOR (Germany)	NÜR (Germany)	ZAN (Netherlands)	BRH (United Kingdom)	OSC (Germany)	HOC (Germany)	ADR (Italy)	SHA (China)	Points

Colour	Result
Gold	Winner
Silver	Second place
Bronze	Third place
Green	Points classification
Blue	Non-points classification
Blue	Non-classified finish (NC)
Purple	Retired, not classified (Ret)
Red	Did not qualify (DNQ)
Red	Did not pre-qualify (DNPQ)
Black	Disqualified (DSQ)
White	Did not start (DNS)
White	Withdrew (WD)
White	Race cancelled (C)
Blank	Did not practice (DNP)
Blank	Did not arrive (DNA)
Blank	Excluded (EX)

**Bold** – Pole
Italics – Fastest Lap

- † — Driver retired, but was classified as they completed 90% of the winner's race distance.

=== Teams' championship ===
Pos.	Team	No.	HOC (Germany)	VAL (Spain)	LAU (Germany)	NOR (Germany)	NÜR (Germany)	ZAN (Netherlands)	BRH (United Kingdom)	OSC (Germany)	HOC (Germany)	ADR (Italy)	SHA (China)	Points
1	Salzgitter / Mercedes-Benz Bank AMG	3	**1**	7	5	6	3	1	5	4	4	**2**	1	133
1	Salzgitter / Mercedes-Benz Bank AMG	4	2	2	1	3	1	7	2	2	Ret	3	13	133
2	Laureus AMG Mercedes	7	4	5	**2**	10	2	2	**1**	**1**	1	9	**2**	74
2	Laureus AMG Mercedes	8	9	Ret	9	**11**	6	9	Ret	9	Ret	11	10	74
3	Audi Sport Team Abt	1	7	4	8	5	4	**3**	3	11	**2**	1	3	71
3	Audi Sport Team Abt	2	Ret	14†	11	4	11	6	6	13	6	5	17	71
4	Audi Sport Team Abt Sportsline	5	6	**1**	Ret	2	**7**	4	Ret	3	Ret	8	9	55
4	Audi Sport Team Abt Sportsline	6	17†	DSQ	6	8	13	8	7	8	5	6	4	55
5	TV Spielfilm / Junge Sterne AMG Mercedes	11	3	9	3	1	5	10	10	7	8	12	6	36
5	TV Spielfilm / Junge Sterne AMG Mercedes	12	11	10	7	15	Ret	15	Ret	10	7	14	11	36
6	Audi Sport Team Phoenix	9	10	3	Ret	7	Ret	11	8	6	Ret	Ret	DNS	34
6	Audi Sport Team Phoenix	10	5	6	4	12	9	13	9	5	3	16	12	34
7	Audi Sport Rookie Team Abt	18	8	8	13	Ret	14	5	4	Ret	Ret	17†	5	15
8	Audi Sport Team Rosberg	14	15	15†	10	Ret	Ret	DNS	15†	Ret	Ret	4	7	7
8	Audi Sport Team Rosberg	15	14	DNS	14	16	15	14	14	Ret	Ret	15	14	7
8	Deutsche Post / GQ AMG Mercedes	16	16	11	15	9	8	Ret	11	12	9	7	16	4
8	Deutsche Post / GQ AMG Mercedes	17	12	13†	Ret	13	10	12	12	14	Ret	10	8	4
Pos.	Team	No.	HOC (Germany)	VAL (Spain)	LAU (Germany)	NOR (Germany)	NÜR (Germany)	ZAN (Netherlands)	BRH (United Kingdom)	OSC (Germany)	HOC (Germany)	ADR (Italy)	SHA (China)	Points

== Bibliography ==
- Voigt, Thomas (November 2010). DTM Jahrbuch 2010: Das offizielle Buch der DTM (in German). Königswinter: Heel Verlag. ISBN 978-3-86852-323-2.
- Schröder, Torben (November 2010). Tourenwagen Story 2010 (in German). Saint Vith: Adrenalin Verlag. ISBN 978-3-940672-28-5.
