= Shanghai Street Circuit =

Motorsport track in Shanghai, China

Shanghai Street Circuit 上海街道赛道
- DTM Circuit (2010)

- DTM Circuit (2004)
- Location: Pudong, Shanghai
- Coordinates: 31°13′16″N 121°32′38″E
- Opened: 17 July 2004; 22 years ago
- Closed: 28 November 2010; 15 years ago
- Major events: DTM (2004, 2010)

DTM Circuit (2010)
- Length: 2.465 km (1.532 mi)
- Race lap record: 0:59.189 ( (United Kingdom) David Coulthard, AMG-Mercedes C-Klasse 2008, 2010, DTM)

DTM Circuit (2004)
- Length: 2.840 km (1.765 mi)
- Race lap record: 1:13.189 ( (Germany) Bernd Schneider, AMG-Mercedes C-Klasse 2004, 2004, DTM)

Shanghai Street Circuit (上海街道赛道) is a street circuit in Pudong, Shanghai. On 18 July 2004, the 2.840 km (1.765 mi) track hosted a non-championship race of Deutsche Tourenwagen Masters won by Gary Paffett for Mercedes-AMG.

On 28 January 2010, DTM bosses revealed the final calendar for the 2010 Deutsche Tourenwagen Masters season featured a season finale on a shortened 2.465 km (1.532 mi) version of the street circuit on 31 October 2010 for the first time in six years. The race was later rescheduled for 28 November 2010, and was won by Gary Paffett, while his teammate at HWA Team Paul di Resta claimed the drivers' title there.

== Lap records ==
The fastest official race lap records at the Shanghai Street Circuit are listed as:

Category	Time	Driver	Vehicle	Event
DTM Circuit (2010): 2.465 km (1.532 mi)
DTM	0:59.189	David Coulthard	AMG-Mercedes C-Klasse 2008	2010 Pudong DTM round
DTM Circuit (2004): 2.840 km (1.765 mi)
DTM	1:13.189	Bernd Schneider	AMG-Mercedes C-Klasse 2004	2004 Pudong DTM round
