= Peter Dumbreck =

Scottish racing driver (born 1973)

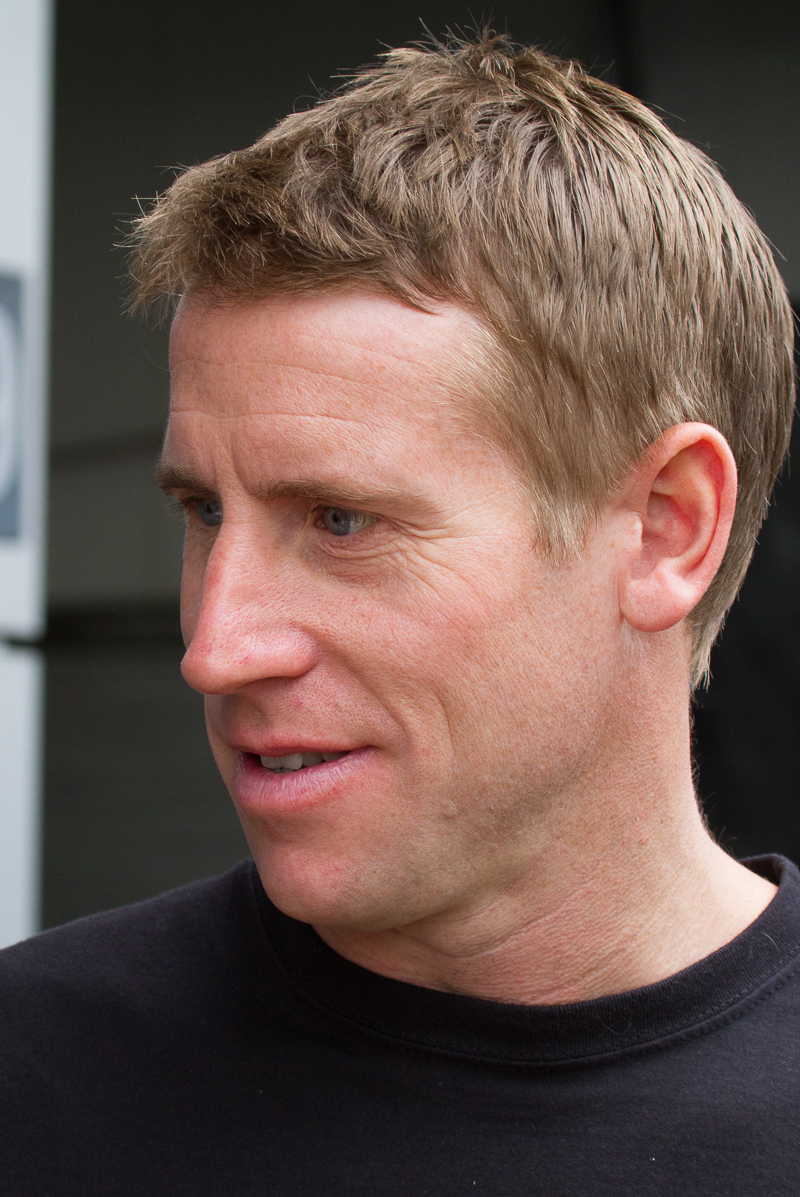
- Dumbreck at Fuji Speedway in 2012
- Nationality: (United Kingdom) British
- Born: Peter James Dumbreck; 13 October 1973 (age 53) Kirkcaldy, Fife, Scotland
- Categorisation: FIA Platinum (until 2017); FIA Gold (2018–)

24 Hours of Le Mans career
- Years: 1999, 2006, 2008, 2010, 2012–2013
- Teams: AMG Mercedes; Spyker Squadron; JRM
- Best finish: 6th (2012)
- Class wins: 0

Peter James Dumbreck (born 13 October 1973) is a British professional racing driver from Scotland. He is the 1998 Japanese Formula 3 champion and won the 1998 Macau Grand Prix.

== Biography ==
Born in Kirkcaldy, Dumbreck dominated the 1994 British Formula Vauxhall Junior championship and followed this in 1996 with a similarly strong performance when he won ten races to take the full Formula Vauxhall Championship.

After finishing third in British Formula 3 in 1997, Dumbreck took the 1998 Japanese Formula 3 title with a record-breaking eight wins out of ten races. The climax of Dumbreck's 1998 season was victory at the Macau Grand Prix – a race that traditionally attracts entries from all the world's top flight Formula 3 drivers.

This dominant outing in Japanese Formula 3 enabled Dumbreck to move up to the Formula Nippon championship for the 1999 season. Driving for Team LeyJun, his performances were good enough for seventh in the championship (including both a second place finish and a pole position in Round 4 at Fuji) as well as scoring all of the team's points for the season.

In that same year, Dumbreck escaped uninjured from a violent crash during the 1999 24 Hours of Le Mans race when his No. 5 Mercedes-Benz CLR somersaulted into the woods at about 300 km/h (190 mph). An aerodynamic design flaw caused the front of the car to rise and then flip without any external contact; Mark Webber had already suffered similar crashes in the No. 4 car during the Thursday night practice and the Saturday morning warm-up. The remaining No. 6 car was retired immediately, and the team withdrew from all other planned entries in endurance racing and the American Le Mans Series.

When the Deutsche Tourenwagen Masters (DTM) returned from the 2000 season onwards, Dumbreck continued to race for Mercedes-Benz in the DTM touring car championship until 2002. A third place in the final standings of the 2001 season was his best result. He then moved to the Opel team in 2003 and 2004 where he suffered another major accident at Zandvoort track in 2004.

In 2005, Dumbreck returned to Japanese Super GT (JGTC/Super GT) in the midst of the season, driving a Toyota which became Lexus from 2006 to 2008. His first victory for Lexus came at Fuji on 4 May 2006.

In 2006, Dumbreck returned to Le Mans and drove the No. 85 Spyker Spyder for Spyker Squadron in the GT2 class, but that car retired with only 40 laps completed resulting in 47th finish overall. The same result occurred two years later 52nd overall only 43 laps completed. In 2010, Dumbreck returned again with Spyker and finally finished the race 27th overall, a classified finisher, and ninth place in GT2.

In 2015, Dumbreck won third place overall at the 43rd ADAC Zurich Nürburgring 24 Hour Endurance Race with Falken Motorsports.

On 12 May 2017, Dumbreck broke the lap record at the Nürburgring Nordschleife with the full electric Supercar NIO EP9 by Chinese manufacturer NIO with a 6:45.90. It was the first time a full electric car held the lap record at the Nordschleife.

== Racing record ==
=== Complete British Formula 3 results ===
(key) (Races in bold indicate pole position) (Races in italics indicate fastest lap)

Year	Entrant	Engine	Class	1	2	3	4	5	6	7	8	9	10	11	12	13	14	15	16	DC	Pts
1997	Stewart Racing	Mugen	A	DON; 5	SIL; 2	THR; 3	BRH; 2	SIL; 4	CRO; 3	OUL; 1	SIL; 13	PEM; 1; 3	PEM; 2 Ret	DON; 5	SNE; 1; 6	SNE; 2; 5	SPA; DNS	SIL; 7	THR; 4	3rd	149

=== Complete Japanese Formula 3 results ===
(key) (Races in bold indicate pole position) (Races in italics indicate fastest lap)

Year	Team	Engine	1	2	3	4	5	6	7	8	9	10	DC	Pts
1998	TOM'S	Toyota	**SUZ**; 1	TSU; 3	MIN; 1	**FUJ**; 1	**MOT**; 2	SUZ; 1	**SUG**; 1	**TAI**; 1	**SEN**; 1	**SUG**; 1	1st	63

=== Complete JGTC/Super GT results ===
(key) (Races in bold indicate pole position) (Races in italics indicate fastest lap)

Year	Team	Car	Class	1	2	3	4	5	6	7	8	9	DC	Pts
1998	Apex	Toyota MR2	GT300	SUZ	FUJ	SEN	FUJ; 2	MOT; 4	MIN; 4	SUG; Ret			6th	35
2005	Toyota Team Kraft	Toyota Supra	GT500	OKA	FUJ	SEP	SUG	MOT; 5	FUJ; 6	AUT; 9	SUZ; 13		18th	13
2006	Toyota Team Kraft	Lexus SC430	GT500	SUZ; 14	OKA; 12	FUJ; 1	SEP; 11	SUG; 7	SUZ; 3	MOT; 7	AUT; 9	FUJ; 2	9th	64
2007	Toyota Team Kraft	Lexus SC430	GT500	SUZ; 8	OKA; 9	FUJ; 7	SEP	SUG	SUZ; Ret	MOT; 9	AUT; 11	FUJ; 11	21st	12
2008	Toyota Team Kraft	Lexus SC430	GT500	SUZ; 6	OKA; 6	FUJ; 5	SEP; 10	SUG; 2	SUZ; 10	MOT; 6	AUT; 15	FUJ; 6	9th	45

=== Complete Formula Nippon results ===
(key) (Races in bold indicate pole position) (Races in italics indicate fastest lap)

Year	Entrant	1	2	3	4	5	6	7	8	9	10	DC	Points
1999	Team LeyJun	SUZ; 4	MOT; 6	MIN; 5	**FUJ**; 2	SUZ; Ret	SUG; Ret	FUJ; 5	MIN; 5	MOT; 10	SUZ; 10	7th	16

=== 24 Hours of Le Mans results ===
Year	Team	Co-drivers	Car	Class	Laps	Pos.	Class pos.
1999	(Germany) AMG-Mercedes	(France) Christophe Bouchut (Germany) Nick Heidfeld	Mercedes-Benz CLR	LMGTP	75	DNF	DNF
2006	(Netherlands) Spyker Squadron b.v.	(Netherlands) Donny Crevels (Netherlands) Tom Coronel	Spyker C8 Spyder GT2-R	GT2	40	DNF	DNF
2008	(Netherlands) Snoras Spyker Squadron	(Germany) Ralf Kelleners (Russia) Alexey Vasilyev	Spyker C8 Laviolette GT2-R	GT2	43	DNF	DNF
2010	(Netherlands) Spyker Squadron	(Netherlands) Tom Coronel (Netherlands) Jeroen Bleekemolen	Spyker C8 Laviolette GT2-R	GT2	280	27th	9th
2012	(United Kingdom) JRM	(Australia) David Brabham (India) Karun Chandhok	HPD ARX-03a	LMP1	357	6th	6th
2013	(United Kingdom) Aston Martin Racing	(United Kingdom) Darren Turner (Germany) Stefan Mücke	Aston Martin Vantage GTE	LMGTE Pro	314	17th	**3rd**

=== Complete Deutsche Tourenwagen Masters results ===
(key) (Races in bold indicate pole position) (Races in italics indicate fastest lap)

Year	Team	Car	1	2	3	4	5	6	7	8	9	10	11	12	13	14	15	16	17	18	19	20	Pos.	Pts
2000	Persson Motorsport	AMG Mercedes CLK-DTM	HOC; 1; 5	HOC; 2; 5	OSC; 1; 11	OSC; 2; 5	NOR; 1; 14	NOR; 2; 9	SAC; 1; 2	SAC; 2; 2	NÜR; 1; 6	NÜR; 2; 12	LAU; 1 C	LAU; 2 C	OSC; 1 NC	OSC; 2; 6	NÜR; 1; 10	NÜR; 2; 9	HOC; 1; 7	HOC; 2 Ret			8th	75
2001	Team D2 AMG	AMG Mercedes CLK-DTM	HOC; QR; 2	HOC; CR; 3	NÜR; QR; 3	NÜR; CR; 8	OSC; QR; 5	OSC; CR; 4	**SAC**; **QR**; 1	**SAC**; **CR**; 6	NOR; QR; 7	NOR; CR; 5	LAU; QR; 4	LAU; CR; 1	NÜR; QR; Ret	NÜR; CR; DNS	A1R; QR; 2	A1R; CR; Ret	ZAN; QR; 3	ZAN; CR; 7	HOC; QR; 3	HOC; CR; 2	**3rd**	**88**
2002	Persson Motorsport	AMG Mercedes CLK-DTM	HOC; QR; 7	HOC; CR; 16†	ZOL; QR; 16	ZOL; CR; 13	DON; QR; 17	DON; CR; 10	SAC; QR; 12	SAC; CR; 10	NOR; QR; 12	NOR; CR; 9	LAU; QR; 16	LAU; CR; 15	NÜR; QR; 17	NÜR; CR; 8	A1R; QR; 15	A1R; CR; 18	ZAN; QR; 18	ZAN; CR; 13	HOC; QR; 13	HOC; CR; 12	17th	0
2003	OPC Team Phoenix	Opel Astra V8 Coupé 2003	HOC; 6	ADR; 6	NÜR; 5	LAU; 2	NOR; 4	DON; 6	NÜR; 10	A1R; Ret	ZAN; 10	HOC; 4											7th	31
2004	OPC Team Phoenix	Opel Vectra GTS V8 2004	HOC; 6	EST; 9	ADR; Ret	LAU; 11	NOR; 7	SHA^{1}	NÜR; 8	OSC; 11	ZAN; Ret	BRN; 11	HOC; Ret										10th	12

- † – Retired, but was classified as he completed 90% of the winner's race distance.

^{1} – A non-championship one-off race was held in 2004, in Shanghai, China.

=== Complete Porsche Supercup results ===
(key) (Races in bold indicate pole position) (Races in italics indicate fastest lap)

Year	Team	Car	1	2	3	4	5	6	7	8	9	10	11	12	Pos.	Pts
2005	Porsche AG	Porsche 997 GT3	ITA	ESP	MON	GER	USA	USA	FRA	GBR; 11	GER	HUN	ITA	BEL	NC‡	0‡

‡ – Not eligible for points for entering as a guest driver.

=== Complete GT1 World Championship results ===
Year	Team	Car	1	2	3	4	5	6	7	8	9	10	11	12	13	14	15	16	17	18	19	20	Pos.	Pts
2010	Sumo Power GT	Nissan	ABU; QR; 11	ABU; CR; 16	SIL; QR; 8	SIL; CR; Ret	BRN; QR; 3	BRN; CR; 3	PRI; QR; 9	PRI; CR; 2	SPA; QR; 8	SPA; CR; Ret	NÜR; QR; Ret	NÜR; CR; 15	ALG; QR; 1	ALG; CR; 4	NAV; QR; 16	NAV; CR; Ret	INT; QR; 2	INT; CR; 6	SAN; QR; 6	SAN; CR; Ret	9th	71
2011	JR Motorsports	Nissan	ABU; QR; 2	ABU; CR; 2	ZOL; QR; Ret	ZOL; CR; Ret	ALG; QR; 1	ALG; CR; 12	SAC; QR; 6	SAC; CR; 7	SIL; QR; Ret	SIL; CR; Ret	NAV; QR; 7	NAV; CR; 9	PRI; QR; 4	PRI; CR; Ret	ORD; QR; 2	ORD; CR; 2	BEI; QR; 7	BEI; CR; 7	SAN; QR; NC	SAN; CR; 8	9th	78

=== Complete FIA World Endurance Championship results ===
Year	Entrant	Class	Chassis	Engine	1	2	3	4	5	6	7	8	Rank	Points
2012	JRM	LMP1	HPD ARX-03	Honda LM-V8 3.4 L V8	SEB; 12	SPA; 9	LMS; 5	SIL; 7	SÃO; 9	BHR; Ret	FUJ; 5	SHA; 5	10th	50.5
2013	Aston Martin Racing	LMGTE Pro	Aston Martin Vantage GTE	Aston Martin 4.5 L V8	SIL	SPA; 4	LMS; 3	SÃO	COA	FUJ	SHA	BHR	13th	42

=== Complete WeatherTech SportsCar Championship results ===
(key) (Races in bold indicate pole position; results in italics indicate fastest lap)

Year	Team	Class	Make	Engine	1	2	3	4	5	6	7	8	9	10	11	Pos.	Pts
2014	Krohn Racing	GTLM	Ferrari 458 Italia GT2	Ferrari F142 4.5 V8	DAY; 7	SEB	LBH	LGA	WGL	MOS	IMS	ELK	VIR	COA	PET	32nd	25

Awards
Preceded by Guy Smith	Autosport; British Club Driver of the Year; 1996	Succeeded by Doug Bell
Sporting positions
Preceded by Tom Coronel	All-Japan Formula Three; Champion; 1998	Succeeded by Darren Manning
Preceded by Soheil Ayari	Macau Grand Prix; Winner; 1998	Succeeded by Darren Manning
