= Gary Paffett =

British racing driver (born 1981)

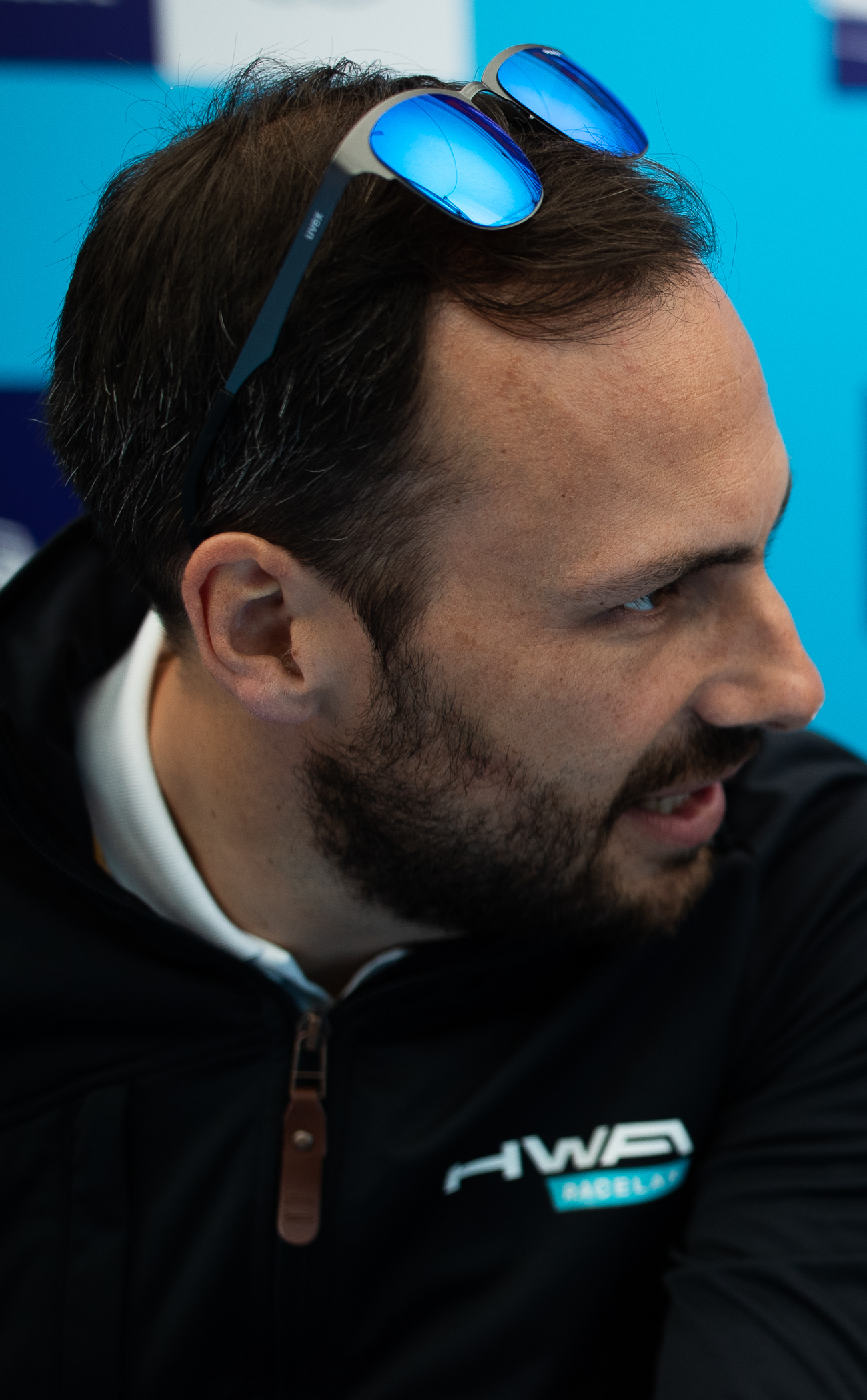
- Paffett in 2019
- Nationality: (United Kingdom) British
- Born: Gary James Paffett; 24 March 1981 (age 45) Bromley, Greater London, England

FIA Formula E career
- Debut season: 2018–19
- Categorisation: FIA Platinum
- Car number: 17
- Former teams: HWA Racelab
- Starts: 13
- Championships: 0
- Wins: 0
- Podiums: 0
- Poles: 0
- Fastest laps: 0
- Finished last season: 19th

Previous series
- 2003–18 2005–12 2003 2001–02 2000 1998 1998–99 1997: DTM; Formula One testing International Formula 3000; German F3; British F3; FPA Winter Series; Formula Vauxhall Junior; FVauxhall Junior W. Series

Championship titles
- 2018 2005 2002 2000 1999 1998 1997: DTM; DTM; German F3; British F3 National Class; Formula Vauxhall Junior; FVauxhall Junior Class B FVauxhall Junior W. Series

Awards
- 1999: McLaren Autosport Award

Gary James Paffett (born 24 March 1981 in Bromley) is a British former racing driver, motorsport executive and Racing Director who currently works at CUPRA Kiro in Formula E. He also works with the British Touring Car Championship team Laser Tools Racing with MB Motorsport, helping founder and manager Mark Blundell.

Having become a household name in the Deutsche Tourenwagen Masters (DTM), following fifteen years in the series and two championship wins, Paffett moved onto Formula E for the 2018/19 championship, after it was announced in 2017 that Mercedes would no longer be taking part in DTM. Paffett was also a test driver for the Williams Formula One team, having previously worked in a similar role at McLaren for a number of years, during the team's successful title winning years. Paffett progressed through the ranks of karting and junior formulae in the United Kingdom, winning the McLaren Autosport BRDC Award in 1999. He now lives in Ousden, Suffolk, England.

== Racing career ==
=== 1993 to 1999: Early Years ===
In 1993, Paffett joined the British Cadet Championships and earned himself a respectable third place. A year later he moved to British Junior TKM Championship and finished second overall. In 1995, he won the British Junior TKM Championship and also second place in the Junior ICA European Championship. Successes continued into 1996, winning the McLaren Mercedes Karting Champion of the Future award and also second in the British Junior ICA Championship. The next year, he moved into single-seaters, winning the Formula Vauxhall Junior Winter Series, picking up the best newcomer's award in that series in the process. In 1998, he was Formula Vauxhall Junior Class B Champion with thirteen poles and thirteen wins, dominating every race of the season. He also set a track record which had never before been set by any "B" class car. He got promoted to the Formula Vauxhall Junior and won the championship with two track records, four wins, five fastest laps, three pole positions. At the season's end, he was awarded the prestigious McLaren Autosport BRDC Young Driver of the Year award.

=== Formula Three ===
Moving up to Formula Three, Paffett competed in the Scholarship class of the British F3 Championship, becoming champion with twelve wins, thirteen fastest laps and thirteen pole positions. In 2001, moved overseas to the German F3 Championship racing with Keke Rosberg's race team, finishing sixth overall. Remaining in the series for 2002, he dominated the field winning the championship without ever losing the lead.

=== DTM ===
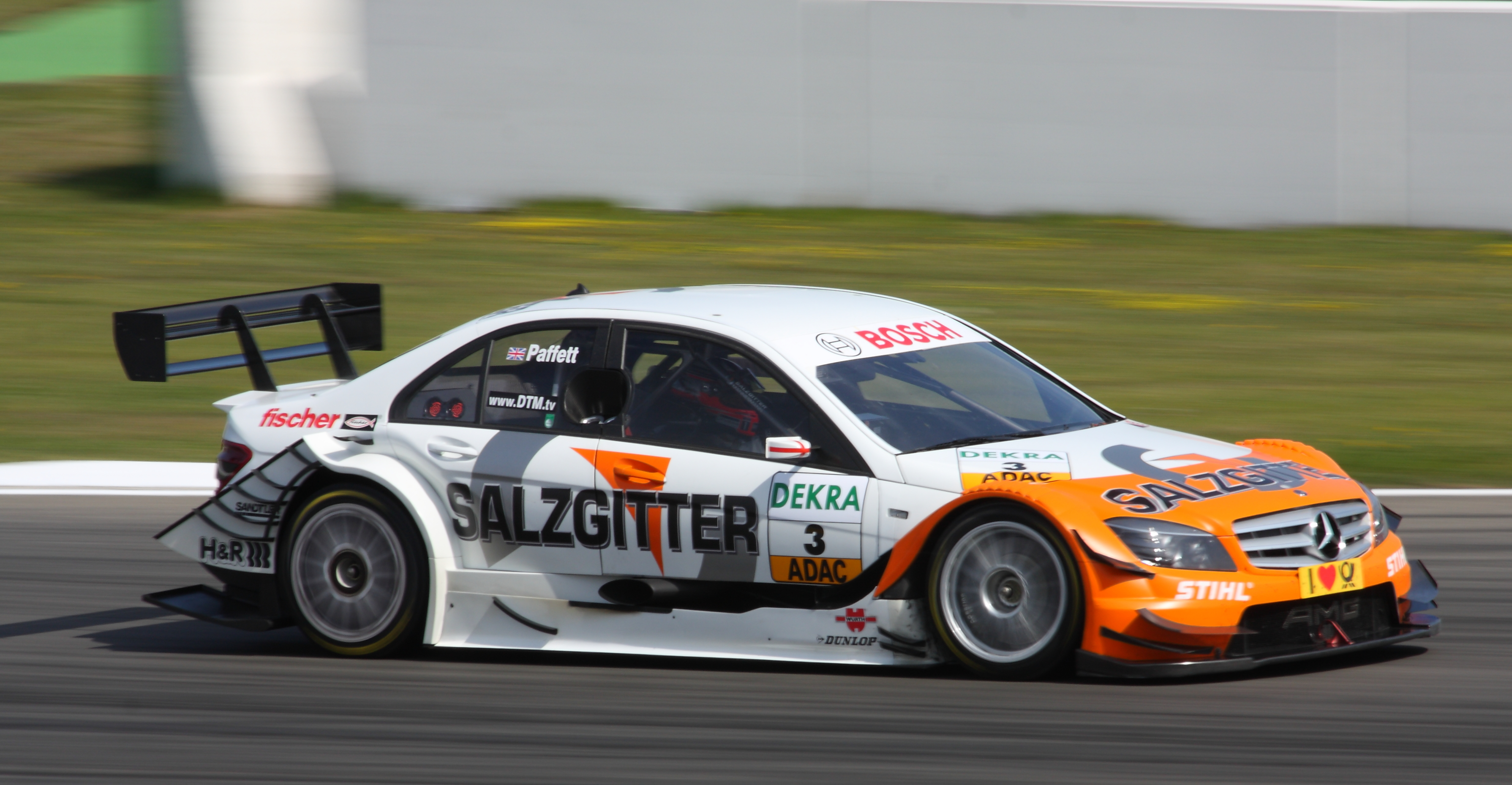
Paffett won his third DTM race in succession, by winning the season-opener at Hockenheim in 2010.

For 2003, Paffett signed to drive for the new Brand Motorsport team in F3000, but the team withdrew from the series leaving Paffett and his team-mate Nicolas Minassian without drives. Mercedes contacted him and signed him to drive in the DTM with Rosberg's Mercedes AMG team in a year-old car, eventually finishing 11th overall. A year later, he was runner up with an up-to-date AMG-Mercedes C-Class and the HWA team taking four wins and one pole position. He was then champion the following year with five wins and four pole positions. In 2007, Paffett returned to the DTM in a 2006 specification race car for the Persson Motorsport team alongside his McLaren F1 testing duties. At the second round at Oschersleben, Paffett became the first driver in the history of the series to win in a year old car. After a further year in older machinery, he was promoted back to the current Mercedes model for 2009, and finished runner-up in the championship, behind Timo Scheider.

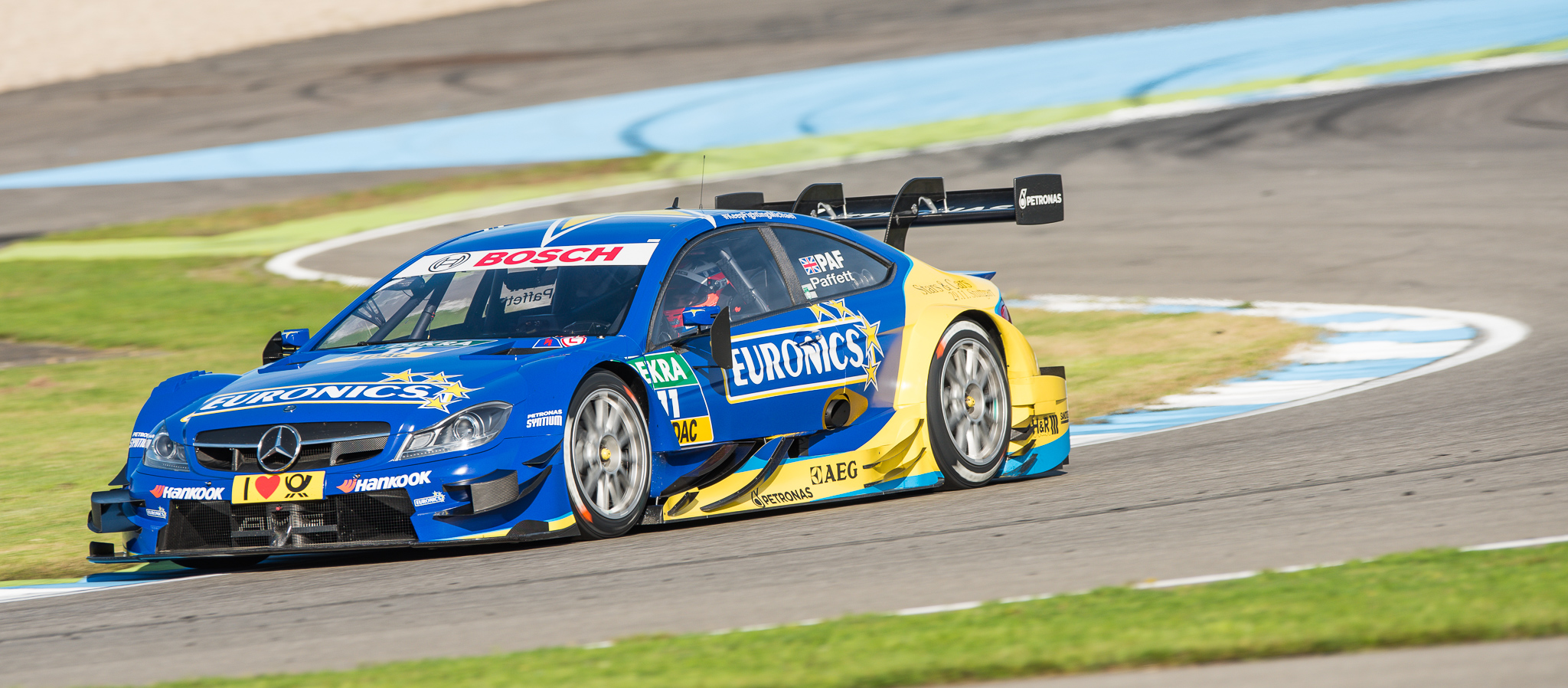
Paffett competing in the 2014 DTM season.

==== 2018 DTM Season ====
In 2017, Mercedes announced it would leave DTM after the 2018 season. After an opening race win from Paffett at the Hockenheimring and a second-place finish in the second race at Lausitzring, Paffett went on to win the fifth round race at Circuit Zandvoort. These three wins alongside three second-place finishes and four third-place finishes proved to be enough to Paffett and Mercedes the Championship title in their final DTM season.

=== Formula One ===
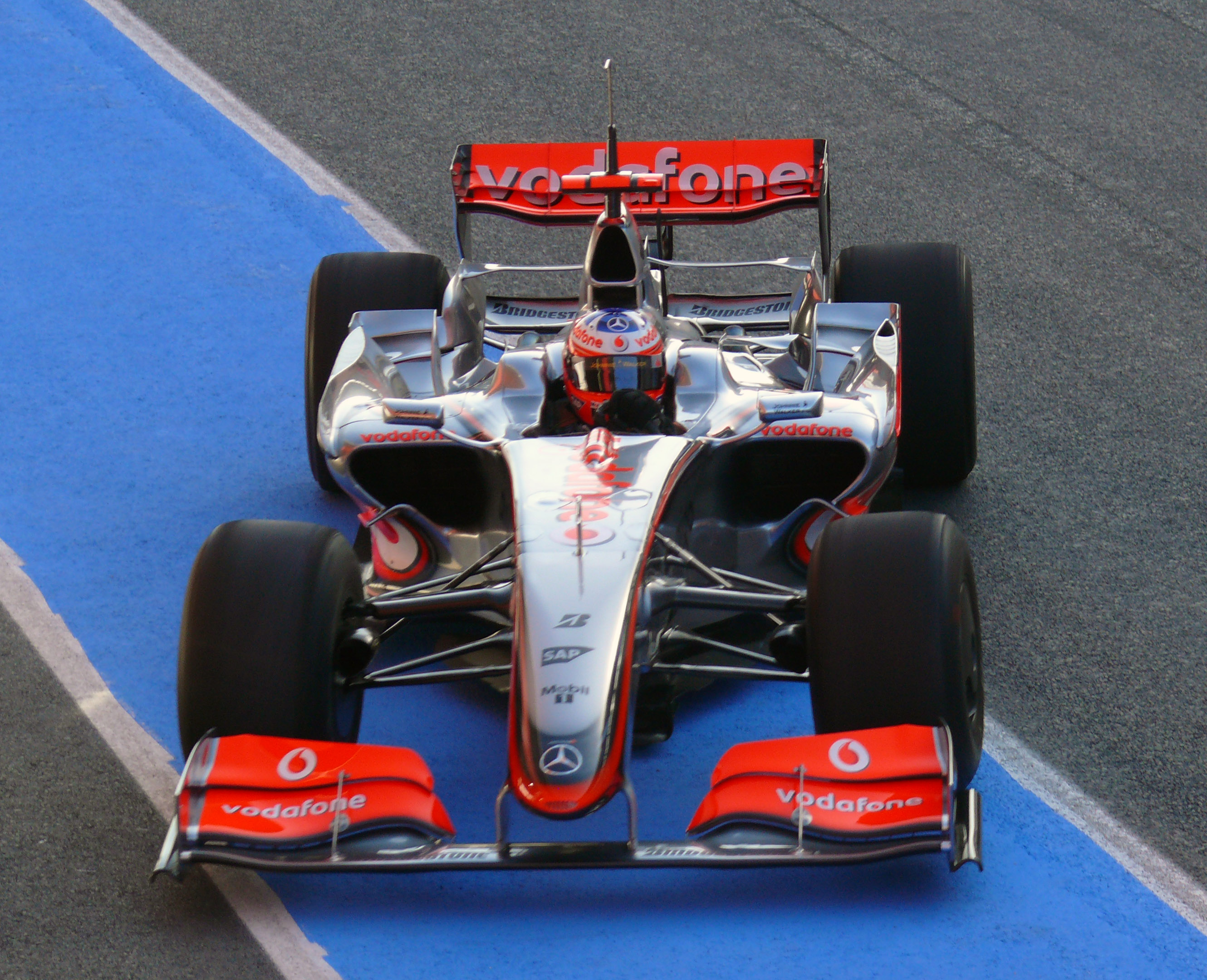
Paffett testing for McLaren at the Autódromo Internacional do Algarve in December 2008.

In December 2005, it was announced that he would not be returning to the DTM series to defend his title but instead would test full-time for McLaren-Mercedes during the 2006 season alongside Pedro de la Rosa. After the departure of Kimi Räikkönen to Ferrari, it was speculated that he may have been in contention for a 2007 race seat in the team alongside World Champion Fernando Alonso. However, due to the arrival of GP2 Champion, Lewis Hamilton, Paffett was overlooked for the drive.

Further to this, Paffett was released from his McLaren contract in October 2006, to search for better opportunities. It was widely speculated that he was likely to sign as a test driver at Honda, but Christian Klien was signed instead. A few weeks later however, Paffett was re-signed by McLaren as the team's second test driver, alongside de la Rosa.

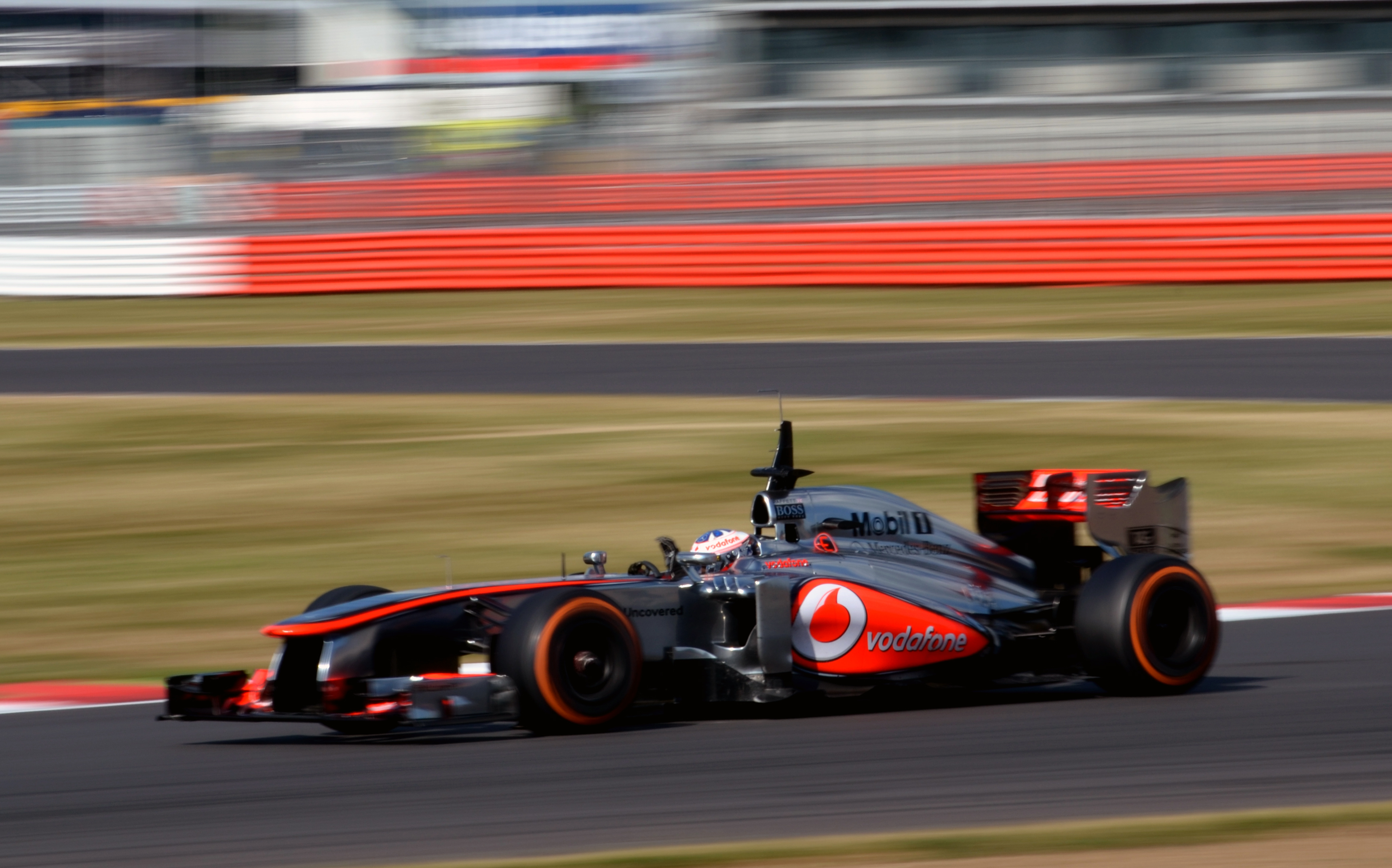
Paffett testing a McLaren MP4-28 at Silverstone in July 2013

Paffett publicly stated that he was looking for a Formula One race seat for 2008, and was linked with the abortive Prodrive F1 project for that season. However, Prodrive failed to make it to the grid so Paffett stayed with McLaren as a test driver. Paffett was signed as Force India's reserve driver for the 2012 Australian Grand Prix as regular reserve driver Jules Bianchi was unavailable due to Formula Renault 3.5 Series testing commitments. On 17 November 2014, it was announced that Paffett would leave McLaren at the end of the 2014 season. This coincided with McLaren's switch to Honda engines for 2015.

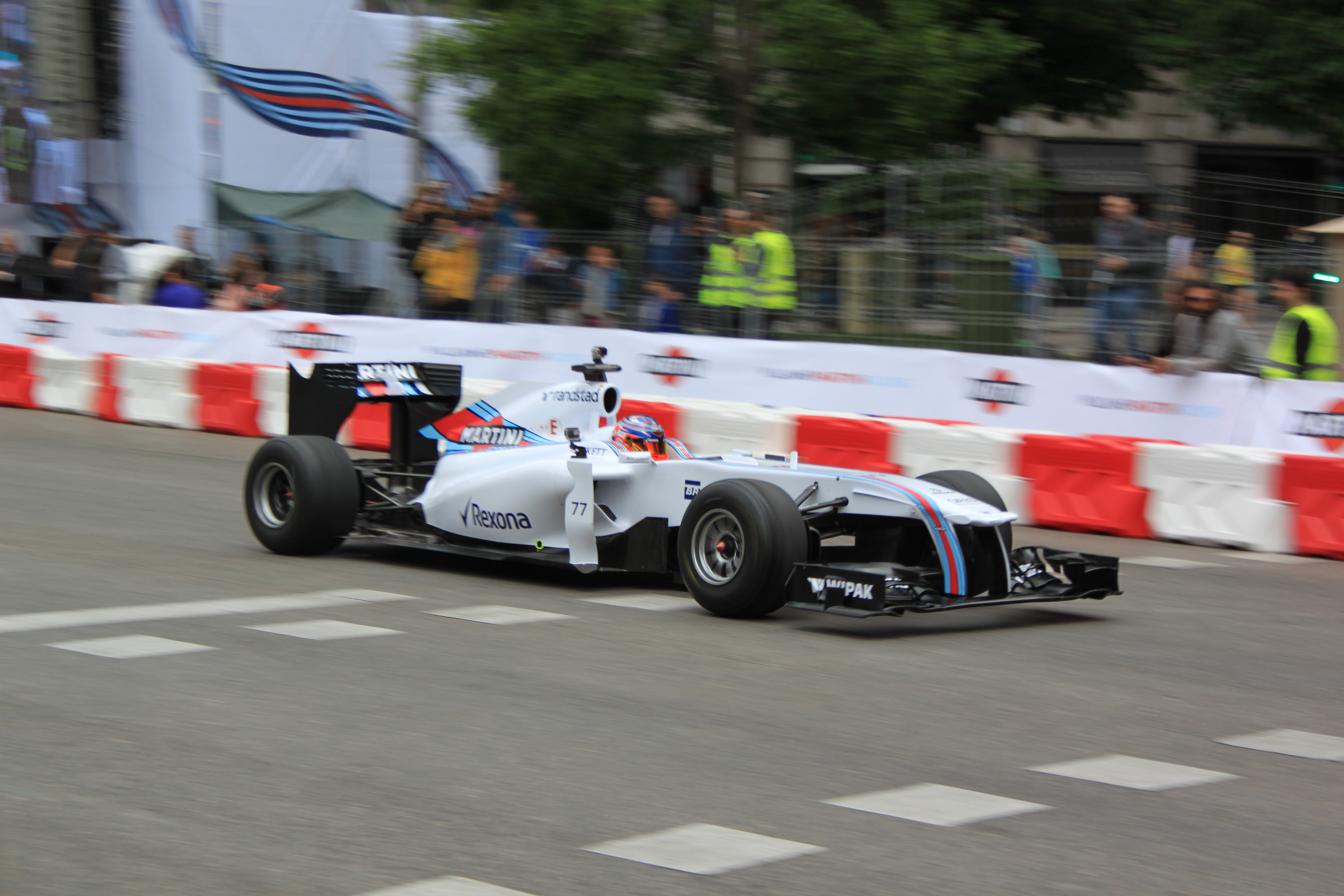
Paffett driving a Williams FW33 on the streets of Madrid during an exhibition in 2016

For 2016, Paffett signed on with Williams as a simulator driver, alongside his duties in DTM. Team deputy Claire Williams said: "We're delighted to have someone with Gary's experience join us at Williams. He is a highly professional racing driver and his level of testing knowledge, and ability to analyse data, will significantly help to drive forward development of the FW38 throughout the season."

=== Formula E ===
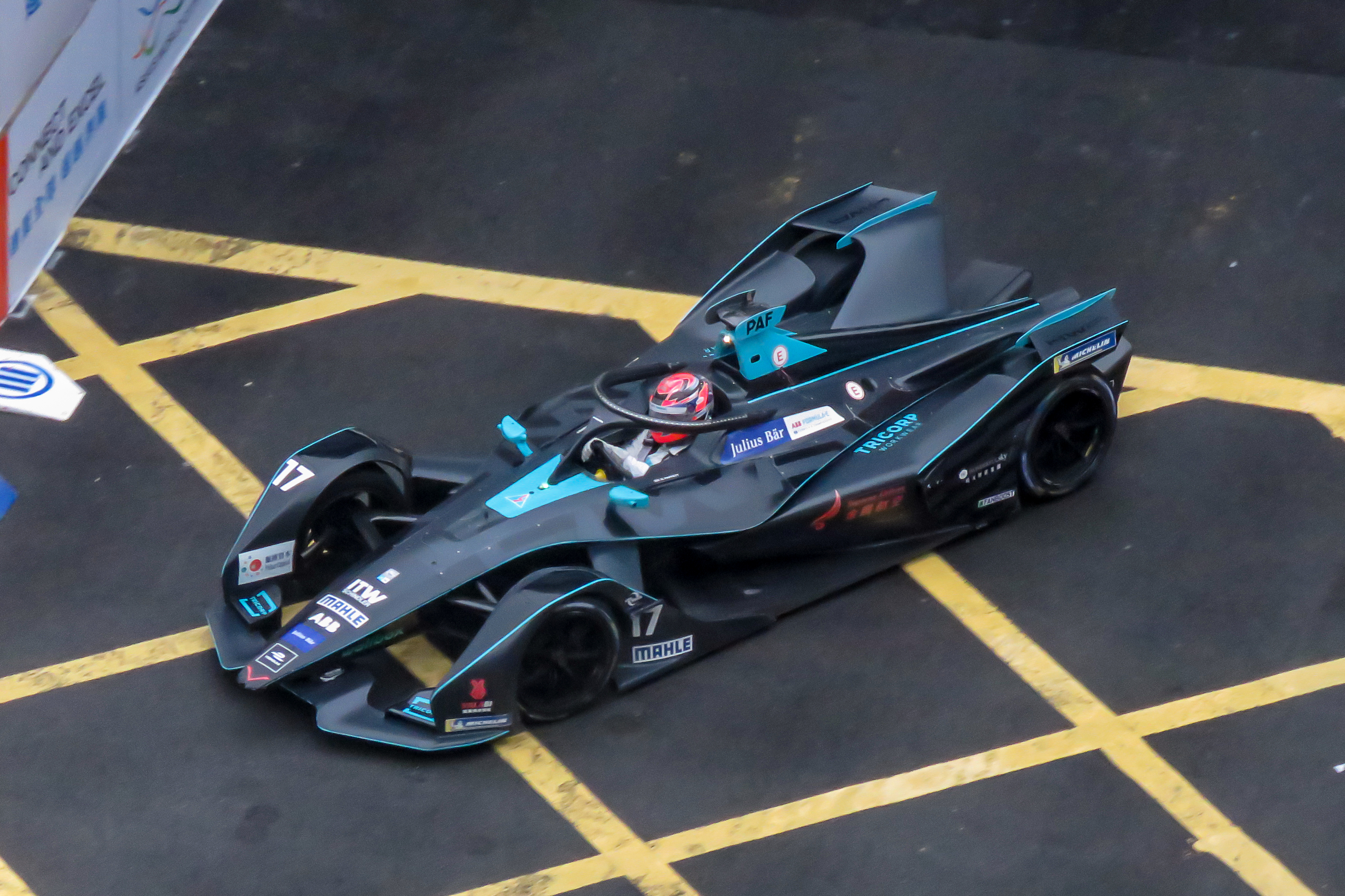
Paffett at the 2019 Hong Kong ePrix

In the 2018–19 Formula E season, Paffett drove for the HWA Racelab Formula E team, together with the Belgian Stoffel Vandoorne. Marking a new adventure for Gary, following his fifteen legendary years in the German Touring Car Series, this season's Formula E championship, marked both Gary's and the HWA team's debut campaign in the 12-round all electric series. He finished the season 19th in the driver's standings after scoring points in Hong Kong, Paris and New York City. On 11 September 2019, it was announced that Paffett would be replaced by Nyck de Vries for the new Mercedes-Benz EQ Formula E Team in the 2019–20 Formula E season. Paffett moved into a management role within the team, working as a sporting and technical advisor, while also being a test and reserve driver.

== Racing record ==
=== Complete German Formula Three results ===
(key) (Races in bold indicate pole position) (Races in italics indicate fastest lap)

Year	Team	Engine	1	2	3	4	5	6	7	8	9	10	11	12	13	14	15	16	17	18	19	20	DC	Pts
2001	Team Rosberg	Opel	HOC; 1; 2	HOC; 2 Ret	NÜR; 1; 8	NÜR; 2; 10	OSC; 1; 1	OSC; 2 Ret	SAC; 1; 22	SAC; 2 Ret	NOR; 1; 4	NOR; 2; 3	HOC; 1 Ret	HOC; 2 Ret	LAU; 1; 5	LAU; 2; 8	NÜR; 1; 12	NÜR; 2; 15	A1R; 1; 4	A1R; 2; 4	**HOC**; **1**; 2	HOC; 2; 2	6th	123
2002	Team Rosberg	Opel	HOC; 1; 1	HOC; 2; 16	NÜR; 1 C	**NÜR**; **2** C	**SAC**; **1**; 1	SAC; 2 EX	**NOR**; **1**; 1	NOR; 2; 1	**LAU**; **1**; 1	LAU; 2; 11	HOC; 1; 2	HOC; 2; 6	NÜR; 1; 7	NÜR; 2; 7	**A1R**; **1**; 1	**A1R**; **2**; 10	ZAN; 1 Ret	ZAN; 2 Ret	HOC; 1; 1	HOC; 2; 7	1st	83

=== Complete International Formula 3000 results ===
(key) (Races in bold indicate pole position) (Races in italics indicate fastest lap).

Year	Entrant	1	2	3	4	5	6	7	8	9	10	DC	Points
2003	Brand Motorsport	IMO; 14	CAT	A1R	MON	NÜR	MAG	SIL	HOC	HUN	MNZ	29th	0

=== Complete Deutsche Tourenwagen Masters results ===
(key) (Races in bold indicate pole position) (Races in italics indicate fastest lap).

Year	Team	Car	1	2	3	4	5	6	7	8	9	10	11	12	13	14	15	16	17	18	19	20	Pos.	Pts
2003	Team Rosberg	AMG-Mercedes CLK-DTM	HOC	ADR	NÜR; Ret	LAU; 15	NOR; Ret	DON; 9	NÜR; 8	A1R; 6	ZAN; 12	HOC; 18†											11th	4
2004	HWA Team	AMG-Mercedes C-Klasse 2004	HOC; 1	EST; 13	ADR; 4	LAU; DSQ	NOR; 1	**SHA**; 1^{‡}	**NÜR**; 1	OSC; 4	ZAN; 4	BRN; 3	HOC; 3										2nd	57
2005	HWA Team	AMG-Mercedes C-Klasse 2005	HOC; 2	**LAU**; 1	SPA; 8	**BRN**; 4	OSC; 1	NOR; 1	**NÜR**; 3	ZAN; 1	LAU; 2	**IST**; 1	HOC; 3										1st	84
2007	Persson Motorsport	AMG-Mercedes C-Klasse 2006	HOC; 8	OSC; 1	LAU; 8	BRH; 10	NOR; 4	MUG; Ret	ZAN; 9	NÜR; 12	CAT; 5	HOC; Ret											9th	20.5
2008	Persson Motorsport	AMG-Mercedes C-Klasse 2007	HOC; 7	OSC; 11	MUG; 12	LAU; 10	NOR; DSQ	ZAN; 11	NÜR; 4	BRH; 8	CAT; 11	BUG; 4	HOC; 11										9th	13
2009	HWA Team	AMG-Mercedes C-Klasse 2009	HOC; Ret	LAU; 1	NOR; 5	ZAN; 1	OSC; 5	NÜR; 8	BRH; 4	CAT; 4	DIJ; 1	HOC; 1											2nd	59
2010	HWA Team	AMG-Mercedes C-Klasse 2009	**HOC**; 1	VAL; 7	LAU; 5	NOR; 6	NÜR; 3	ZAN; 1	BRH; 5	OSC; 4	HOC; 4	**ADR**; 2	SHA; 1										2nd	67
2011	HWA Team	AMG-Mercedes C-Klasse 2009	HOC; 6	ZAN; 9	SPL; 8	LAU; 4	NOR; Ret	NÜR; 8	BRH; 4	OSC; 4	VAL; 8	HOC; 5											7th	25
2012	HWA Team	AMG-Mercedes C-Klasse Coupé	HOC; 1	LAU; 2	**BRH**; 1	SPL; 3	**NOR**; 4	NÜR; 6	ZAN; 7	OSC; 2	VAL; Ret	HOC; 2											2nd	145
2013	HWA Team	AMG-Mercedes C-Klasse Coupé	HOC; 4	BRH; 6	SPL; 9	LAU; 1	NOR; 18†	MSC; 5	NÜR; 17	OSC; 6	ZAN; 9	HOC; 9											6th	69
2014	HWA Team	DTM AMG Mercedes C-Coupé	HOC; 12	OSC; 8	HUN; Ret	NOR; 12	MSC; 16	SPL; 17	NÜR; 16	LAU; 13	ZAN; 19†	HOC; 10											22nd	5
2015	ART Grand Prix	DTM AMG Mercedes C-Coupé	HOC; 1 Ret	HOC; 2; 3	LAU; 1; 23	LAU; 2 Ret	NOR; 1; 3	NOR; 2; 7	ZAN; 1; 11	ZAN; 2; 10	SPL; 1; 7	SPL; 2; 2	MSC; 1; 7	MSC; 2; 6	OSC; 1 Ret	OSC; 2; 13	NÜR; 1; 4	NÜR; 2 Ret	HOC; 1 Ret	**HOC**; **2**; 9			9th	89
2016	Mercedes-Benz DTM Team ART	Mercedes-AMG C63 DTM	HOC; 1; 11	HOC; 2; 4	SPL; 1; 18	SPL; 2; 13	LAU; 1; 14	LAU; 2; 5	NOR; 1; 14	NOR; 2 DSQ	ZAN; 1; 4	ZAN; 2; 2	**MSC**; **1**; 3	MSC; 2; 18	NÜR; 1; 19	NÜR; 2; 7	HUN; 1; 20	HUN; 2; 16	HOC; 1; 19	HOC; 2; 15			11th	73
2017	Mercedes-AMG Motorsport Mercedes Me	Mercedes-AMG C63 DTM	HOC; 1; 7	HOC; 2; 2	LAU; 1; 6	LAU; 2; 4	HUN; 1; 7	HUN; 2; 9	NOR; 1; 10	NOR; 2 Ret	MSC; 1; 7	MSC; 2; 16	ZAN; 1; 8	ZAN; 2; 5	NÜR; 1; 10	NÜR; 2; 14	SPL; 1; 17	SPL; 2; 4	HOC; 1; 9	HOC; 2; 4			10th	102
2018	Mercedes-AMG Motorsport Petronas	Mercedes-AMG C63 DTM	**HOC**; **1**; 1	HOC; 2; 3	LAU; 1; 9	LAU; 2; 1	HUN; 1; 6	HUN; 2; 15	NOR; 1; 2	NOR; 2; 13	**ZAN**; **1**; 1	**ZAN**; **2**; 2	BRH; 1; 6	**BRH**; **2**; 2	MIS; 1 Ret	MIS; 2; 14	NÜR; 1; 3	NÜR; 2; 5	SPL; 1; 10	**SPL**; **2**; 3	HOC; 1; 4	HOC; 2; 3	1st	255

^{†} – Driver did not finish, but completed 90% of the race distance.
^{‡} – Shanghai was a non-championship round.

=== Complete Formula E results ===
(key) (Races in bold indicate pole position) (Races in italics indicate fastest lap)

Year	Team	Chassis	Powertrain	1	2	3	4	5	6	7	8	9	10	11	12	13	Pos	Points
2018–19	HWA Racelab	Spark SRT05e	Venturi VFE05	ADR; Ret	MRK; Ret	SCL; 14	MEX; 16	HKG; 8	SYX; Ret	RME; Ret	PAR; 8	MCO; 12	BER; 16	BRN; 17	NYC; 11	NYC; 10	19th	9

Sporting positions
Preceded by Toshihiro Kaneishi	German Formula Three Champion; 2002	Succeeded by João Paulo de Oliveira
Preceded by Mattias Ekström	Deutsche Tourenwagen Masters; Champion; 2005	Succeeded by Bernd Schneider
Preceded by René Rast	Deutsche Tourenwagen Masters; Champion; 2018	Succeeded by René Rast
Awards
Preceded by Jenson Button	McLaren Autosport BRDC Award; 1999	Succeeded by Anthony Davidson
