= 2004 Deutsche Tourenwagen Masters =

Touring car racing season

Champions
- Drivers' Champion: Mattias Ekström
- Teams' Champion: Abt Sportsline

Seasons
- ← 2003 2005 →

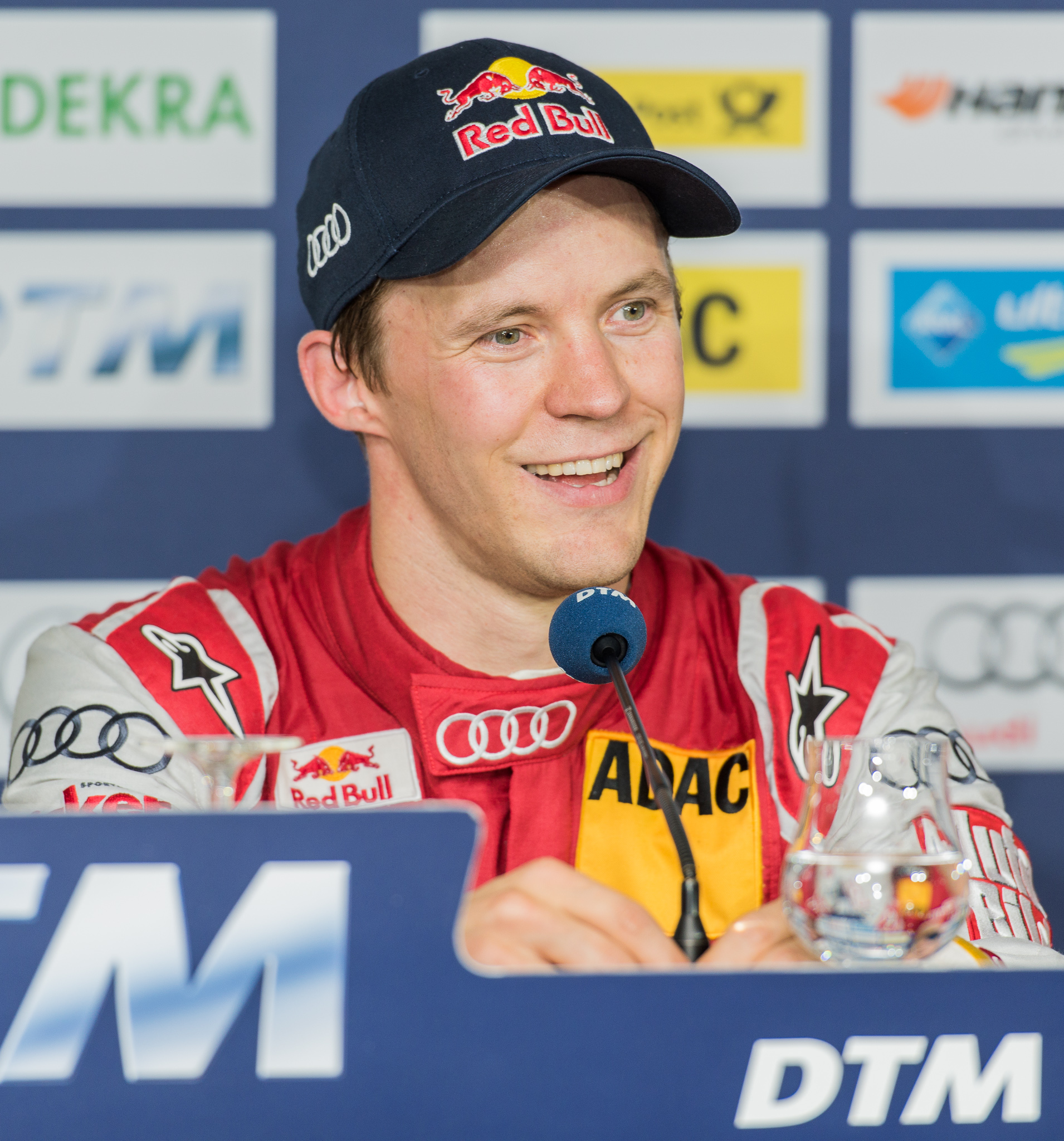
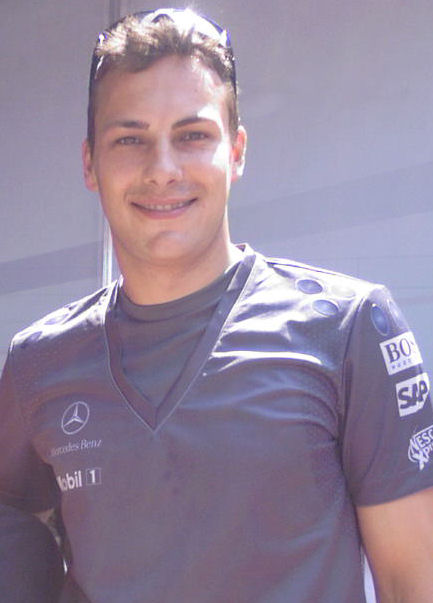
Mattias Ekström (left) won his first Deutsche Tourenwagen Masters Drivers' Championship while Gary Paffett (right) finished second in the championship.

The 2004 Deutsche Tourenwagen Masters was the eighteenth season of premier German touring car championship and also fifth season under the moniker of Deutsche Tourenwagen Masters since the series' resumption in 2000. There were 10 championship race weekend with one round each, plus a non-championship round at the streets of Shanghai. Originally each track hosted one race each with the exception of Hockenheimring (two races, premier and finale). Each track hosted one race, with the exception of Hockenheim, which hosted two. As in 2003 each weekend compromised one race of circa one hour and with two compulsory pit stops for each contender.

== Changes for 2004 ==
- The coupé style cars were replaced by four-door mid-size sedans. Smaller independent teams were allowed to run the year-old coupes for one more season due to cost reasons. While the first-generation 4.0-litre V8 naturally-aspirated engines still remained to continue in the sport until 2018 despite transition to sedans.
- Audi entered as an official works team for the first time since 1992 season despite continued with Mugen Honda-derived engine.
- A non-championship one-off race was held at the streets of Shanghai, China.
- A1-Ring in Austria was removed from the schedule. The track was to undergo major repairs, but those were not completed (see article on A1-Ring for full story).
- DTM did not return to Donington Park in the United Kingdom for 2004. In 2006 a DTM race in Britain did return to the calendar, but with it being held at Brands Hatch.
- Shell became official control fuel partner from 2004 season until mid-2005 season.
- The new Dunlop SP Sport Maxx DTM tyre sizes were altered for the first time. With 265/660-R18 (10.4/25.9-R18) on the fronts and 280/660-R18 (11.0/25.9-R18) on the rears to improve mechanical grip, lateral acceleration and overtaking.

== Teams and drivers ==
The following manufacturers, teams and drivers competed in the championship rounds of the 2004 Deutsche Tourenwagen Masters. All teams competed with tyres supplied by Dunlop.

Manufacturer	Car	Team	No.	Drivers	Rounds
Mercedes-Benz	AMG-Mercedes C-Klasse 2004	HWA Team	1	(Germany) Bernd Schneider	All
Mercedes-Benz	AMG-Mercedes C-Klasse 2004	HWA Team	2	(Netherlands) Christijan Albers	All
Mercedes-Benz	AMG-Mercedes C-Klasse 2004	HWA Team	7	(United Kingdom) Gary Paffett	All
Mercedes-Benz	AMG-Mercedes C-Klasse 2004	HWA Team	8	(France) Jean Alesi	All
Mercedes-Benz	AMG-Mercedes CLK-DTM 2003	Persson Motorsport	17	(Germany) Markus Winkelhock	All
Mercedes-Benz	AMG-Mercedes CLK-DTM 2003	Persson Motorsport	18	(Germany) Stefan Mücke	All
Mercedes-Benz	AMG-Mercedes CLK-DTM 2003	Team Rosberg	20	(Czech Republic) Jarek Janiš	All
Mercedes-Benz	AMG-Mercedes CLK-DTM 2003	Team Rosberg	21	(Germany) Bernd Mayländer	All
Audi	Audi A4 DTM 2004	Abt Sportsline	5	(Sweden) Mattias Ekström	All
Audi	Audi A4 DTM 2004	Abt Sportsline	6	(Germany) Martin Tomczyk	All
Audi	Audi A4 DTM 2004	Abt Sportsline	11	(Germany) Christian Abt	All
Audi	Audi A4 DTM 2004	Abt Sportsline	12	(Denmark) Tom Kristensen	All
Audi	Abt-Audi TT-R 2003	Abt Sportsline	23	(Germany) Peter Terting	NC
Audi	Audi A4 DTM 2004	Team Joest	22	(Italy) Rinaldo Capello	NC
Audi	Audi A4 DTM 2004	Team Joest	44	(Italy) Emanuele Pirro	All
Audi	Audi A4 DTM 2004	Team Joest	45	(Germany) Frank Biela	All
Opel	Opel Vectra GTS V8 2004	Team Phoenix	3	(Switzerland) Marcel Fässler	All
Opel	Opel Vectra GTS V8 2004	Team Phoenix	4	(France) Laurent Aïello	1-10
Opel	Opel Vectra GTS V8 2004	Team Phoenix	14	(United Kingdom) Peter Dumbreck	1-10
Opel	Opel Vectra GTS V8 2004	Team Holzer	9	(Germany) Heinz-Harald Frentzen	All
Opel	Opel Vectra GTS V8 2004	Team Holzer	10	(Germany) Manuel Reuter	1-10
Opel	Opel Vectra GTS V8 2004	Team Holzer	15	(Germany) Timo Scheider	All
Opel	Opel Vectra GTS V8 2004	Euroteam	16	(Netherlands) Jeroen Bleekemolen	8
Opel	Opel Astra V8 Coupé 2003	Euroteam	16	(Netherlands) Jeroen Bleekemolen	1-7, NC, 9-10

=== Team changes ===
- Team Joest returned to the DTM for the first time since 1996.
- Abt Sportsline Junior Team was discontinued.
- Persson Motorsport downscaled to two cars.
- Team Holzer and Team Phoenix increased their car count to three cars each.
- Euroteam downscaled to a one car team.

=== Driver changes ===
- Gary Paffett was promoted from Team Rosberg to HWA Team to replace Marcel Fässler who joined Opel Team Phoenix.
- Thomas Jäger left DTM to race in the 24 Hours of the Nürburgring with Recaro-Raeder-Motorsport.
- Katsutomo Kaneishi left the DTM to return to the JGTC with ARTA.
- Bernd Mayländer and Stefan Mücke swapped seats between Persson Motorsport and Team Rosberg.
- Markus Winkelhock joined the DTM after finishing 4th in the Formula 3 Euro Series.
- Formula 3000 driver Jarek Janiš joined the DTM with Team Rosberg.
- Laurent Aïello left Audi to join Opel Team Phoenix.
- Karl Wendlinger left the DTM to join the FIA GT Championship with JMB Racing.
- 1997, 2000, 2001, 2002 and 2003 Le Mans winner Tom Kristensen joined Abt Sportsline alongside his Endurance racing commitments.
- Martin Tomczyk was promoted to Abt Sportsline from their junior team.
- 1991 DTM champion Frank Biela and Emanuele Pirro returned to the DTM for the first time since 1992 with Team Joest.
- Peter Terting was left without a drive after the withdrawal of the Abt Sportsline Junior Team.
- Alain Menu left the DTM to focus on Endurance racing
- Three time F1 race winner Heinz-Harald Frentzen joined the DTM with Opel Team Holzer after 10 seasons in F1.
- Joachim Winkelhock retired from the DTM after 2003.

=== Mid season changes ===
- The Opels of Laurent Aïello, Peter Dumbreck and Manuel Reuter were unable to enter the Non Championship race in Shanghai. To compensate, Team Joest entered a third Audi A4 for Rinaldo Capello and Abt Sportsline entered an Audi TT for Peter Terting.
- Euroteam ran an Opel Vectra at Zandvoort for Jeroen Bleekemolens home race.

== Race calendar and winners ==
Round	Circuit	Date	Pole position	Fastest Lap	Winning driver	Winning team	Winning manufacturer	TV	Report
1	(Germany) Hockenheimring	18 April	(France) Jean Alesi	(Germany) Bernd Schneider	(United Kingdom) Gary Paffett	C-Klasse AMG Mercedes	(Germany) Mercedes	ARD	Report
2	(Portugal) Estoril	2 May	(Sweden) Mattias Ekström	(United Kingdom) Gary Paffett	(Netherlands) Christijan Albers	DaimlerChrysler Bank AMG-Mercedes	(Germany) Mercedes	ZDF	Report
3	(Italy) Adria	16 May	(Sweden) Mattias Ekström	(Germany) Bernd Schneider	(Sweden) Mattias Ekström	Audi Sport Team Abt	(Germany) Audi	ARD	Report
4	(Germany) EuroSpeedway	6 June	(Netherlands) Christijan Albers	(Germany) Bernd Schneider	(Sweden) Mattias Ekström	Audi Sport Team Abt	(Germany) Audi	ARD	Report
5	(Germany) Norisring	27 June	(France) Jean Alesi	(Germany) Bernd Schneider	(United Kingdom) Gary Paffett	C-Klasse AMG Mercedes	(Germany) Mercedes	ZDF	Report
NC	(China) Shanghai	18 July	(United Kingdom) Gary Paffett	Race abandoned due to Mayländer's accident after hitting a loose manhole cover sucked up by other cars					Report
NC	(China) Shanghai	18 July	(United Kingdom) Gary Paffett	(Germany) Bernd Schneider	(United Kingdom) Gary Paffett	C-Klasse AMG Mercedes	(Germany) Mercedes		Report
6	(Germany) Nürburgring	1 August	(United Kingdom) Gary Paffett	(United Kingdom) Gary Paffett	(United Kingdom) Gary Paffett	C-Klasse AMG Mercedes	(Germany) Mercedes	ARD	Report
7	(Germany) Oschersleben	8 August	(Germany) Martin Tomczyk	(Denmark) Tom Kristensen	(Denmark) Tom Kristensen	Audi Sport Team Abt Sportsline	(Germany) Audi	ZDF	Report
8	(Netherlands) Zandvoort	5 September	(Sweden) Mattias Ekström	(Netherlands) Christijan Albers	(Sweden) Mattias Ekström	Audi Sport Team Abt	(Germany) Audi	ZDF	Report
9	(Czech Republic) Brno	19 September	(Sweden) Mattias Ekström	(Germany) Manuel Reuter	(Sweden) Mattias Ekström	Audi Sport Team Abt	(Germany) Audi	ARD	Report
10	(Germany) Hockenheimring	3 October	(Germany) Martin Tomczyk	(Sweden) Mattias Ekström	(Germany) Bernd Schneider	Vodafone AMG-Mercedes	(Germany) Mercedes	ZDF	Report

== Championship standings ==
=== Scoring system ===
Points are awarded to the top 8 classified finishers.

Position	**1st**	**2nd**	**3rd**	**4th**	**5th**	**6th**	**7th**	**8th**
Points	10	8	6	5	4	3	2	1

=== Drivers' championship ===
Pos	Driver	HOC (Germany)	EST (Portugal)	ADR (Italy)	LAU (Germany)	NOR (Germany)	SHA (China)	SHA (China)	NÜR (Germany)	OSC (Germany)	ZAN (Netherlands)	BRN (Czech Republic)	HOC (Germany)	Pts.
1	(Sweden) Mattias Ekström	3	**2**	**1**	1	4	C	3	2	5	**1**	**1**	6	74
2	(United Kingdom) Gary Paffett	1	13	4	DSQ	1	**C**	**1**	**1**	4	4	3	3	57
3	(Netherlands) Christijan Albers	2	1	2	**2**	2	C	6	16†	12	3	Ret	7	50
4	(Denmark) Tom Kristensen	4	4	10	10	6	C	Ret	5	1	6	2	4	43
5	(Germany) Martin Tomczyk	5	3	8	14	5	C	Ret	Ret	**2**	2	Ret	**2**	39
6	(Germany) Bernd Schneider	17†	5	11	3	3	C	2	3	Ret	5	10	1	36
7	(France) Jean Alesi	**Ret**	7	3	5	**10**	C	4	7	10	11	8	5	19
8	(Germany) Timo Scheider	8	6	5	16	Ret	C	Ret	6	7	12	7	9	15
9	(Switzerland) Marcel Fässler	Ret	20†	Ret	7	Ret	C	Ret	4	8	10	4	Ret	13
10	(France) Laurent Aïello	9	8	6	4	Ret			9	6	Ret	15	Ret	12
11	(Italy) Emanuele Pirro	7	11	9	6	9	C	Ret	11	15	7	5	Ret	11
12	(Germany) Manuel Reuter	10	16	13	8	8			12	3	8	12	Ret	9
13	(United Kingdom) Peter Dumbreck	6	9	Ret	11	7			8	11	Ret	9	Ret	6
14	(Germany) Heinz-Harald Frentzen	11	12	12	Ret	Ret	C	7	Ret	14	Ret	6	12	3
15	(Germany) Stefan Mücke	18†	14	7	Ret	15†	C	10	10	17	17	11	10	2
16	(Germany) Christian Abt	Ret	10	Ret	9	14†	C	Ret	13	9	Ret	12	8	1
17	(Germany) Frank Biela	16	15	Ret	12	11	C	13	Ret	13	9	14	11	0
18	(Netherlands) Jeroen Bleekemolen	12	19	14	17	12	C	12	14	18	13	17	Ret	0
19	(Germany) Markus Winkelhock	15	17	Ret	13	Ret	C	9	Ret	16	14	18	13	0
20	(Germany) Bernd Mayländer	14	18	Ret	Ret	13	C	DNS	15	19	15	16	14	0
21	(Czech Republic) Jarek Janiš	13	Ret	Ret	15	16†	C	8	Ret	20†	16	Ret	Ret	0
-	(Italy) Rinaldo Capello						C	5						0
-	(Germany) Peter Terting						C	11						0
Pos	Driver	HOC (Germany)	EST (Portugal)	ADR (Italy)	LAU (Germany)	NOR (Germany)	SHA (China)	SHA (China)	NÜR (Germany)	OSC (Germany)	ZAN (Netherlands)	BRN (Czech Republic)	HOC (Germany)	Pts.

Colour	Result
Gold	Winner
Silver	Second place
Bronze	Third place
Green	Points classification
Blue	Non-points classification
Blue	Non-classified finish (NC)
Purple	Retired, not classified (Ret)
Red	Did not qualify (DNQ)
Red	Did not pre-qualify (DNPQ)
Black	Disqualified (DSQ)
White	Did not start (DNS)
White	Withdrew (WD)
White	Race cancelled (C)
Blank	Did not practice (DNP)
Blank	Did not arrive (DNA)
Blank	Excluded (EX)

**Bold** – Pole
Italics – Fastest Lap

† Driver retired, but was classified as they completed 90% of the winner's race distance.

‡ Non Championship Round

=== Teams' championship ===
Pos.	Team	No.	HOC (Germany)	EST (Portugal)	ADR (Italy)	LAU (Germany)	NOR (Germany)	SHA (China)	SHA (China)	NÜR (Germany)	OSC (Germany)	ZAN (Netherlands)	BRN (Czech Republic)	HOC (Germany)	Pts.
1	Audi Sport Team Abt	5	3	**2**	**1**	1	4	C	3	2	5	**1**	**1**	6	113
1	Audi Sport Team Abt	6	5	3	8	14	5	C	Ret	Ret	**2**	2	Ret	**2**	113
2	Vodafone / DaimlerChrysler Bank AMG-Mercedes	1	17†	5	11	3	3	C	2	3	Ret	5	10	1	86
2	Vodafone / DaimlerChrysler Bank AMG-Mercedes	2	2	1	2	**2**	2	C	6	16†	12	3	Ret	7	86
3	C-Klasse AMG Mercedes	7	1	13	4	DSQ	1	**C**	**1**	**1**	4	4	3	3	76
3	C-Klasse AMG Mercedes	8	**Ret**	7	3	5	**10**	C	4	7	10	11	8	5	76
4	Audi Sport Team Abt Sportsline	11	Ret	10	Ret	9	14†	C	Ret	13	9	Ret	12	8	44
4	Audi Sport Team Abt Sportsline	12	4	4	10	10	6	C	Ret	5	1	6	2	4	44
5	OPC Team 2	4	9	8	6	4	Ret			9	6	Ret	15	Ret	27
5	OPC Team 2	15	8	6	5	16	Ret	C	Ret	6	7	12	7	9	27
6	OPC Team 4	3	Ret	20†	Ret	7	Ret	C	Ret	4	8	10	4	Ret	19
6	OPC Team 4	14	6	9	Ret	11	7			8	11	Ret	9	Ret	19
7	OPC Team 3	9	11	12	12	Ret	Ret	C	7	Ret	14	Ret	6	12	12
7	OPC Team 3	10	10	16	13	8	8			12	3	8	12	Ret	12
8	Audi Sport Infinion Team Joest	44	7	11	9	6	9	C	Ret	11	15	7	5	Ret	11
8	Audi Sport Infinion Team Joest	45	16	15	Ret	12	11	C	13	Ret	13	9	14	11	11
9	Original-Teile / CLK AMG-Mercedes	17	15	17	Ret	13	Ret	C	9	Ret	16	14	18	13	2
9	Original-Teile / CLK AMG-Mercedes	18	18†	14	7	Ret	15†	C	10	10	17	17	11	10	2
10	OPC Euroteam	16	12	19	14	17	12	C	12	14	18	13	17	Ret	0
11	Sonax Dark Dog / CLK AMG-Mercedes	20	13	Ret	Ret	15	16†	C	8	Ret	20†	16	Ret	Ret	0
11	Sonax Dark Dog / CLK AMG-Mercedes	21	14	18	Ret	Ret	13	C	DNS	15	19	15	16	14	0
-	Audi Sport Infinion Team Joest	22						C	5						0
-	Audi Sport Team Abt	23						C	11						0
Pos.	Team	No.	HOC (Germany)	EST (Portugal)	ADR (Italy)	LAU (Germany)	NOR (Germany)	SHA (China)	SHA (China)	NÜR (Germany)	OSC (Germany)	ZAN (Netherlands)	BRN (Czech Republic)	HOC (Germany)	Pts.

=== Manufacturers' championship ===
Pos.	Manufacturer	HOC (Germany)	EST (Portugal)	ADR (Italy)	LAU (Germany)	NOR (Germany)	NÜR (Germany)	OSC (Germany)	ZAN (Netherlands)	BRN (Czech Republic)	HOC (Germany)	Points
1	Audi	17	19	11	13	12	12	22	23	22	17	168
2	Mercedes	18	16	21	18	24	18	5	15	7	22	164
3	Opel	4	4	7	8	3	9	12	1	10	0	58
Pos.	Manufacturer	HOC (Germany)	EST (Portugal)	ADR (Italy)	LAU (Germany)	NOR (Germany)	NÜR (Germany)	OSC (Germany)	ZAN (Netherlands)	BRN (Czech Republic)	HOC (Germany)	Points

== Bibliography ==
- Voigt, Thomas (November 2004). DTM: Das offizielle Jahrbuch 2004 (in German). Königswinter: Heel Verlag. ISBN 978-3-89880-391-5.
- Dietzel, André (November 2004). Tourenwagen-Story 2004: Die Rennen, die Fahrer, die Technik (in German). Königswinter: Heel Verlag. ISBN 978-3-89880-392-2.
