= Persson Motorsport =

(Germany) Persson Motorsport
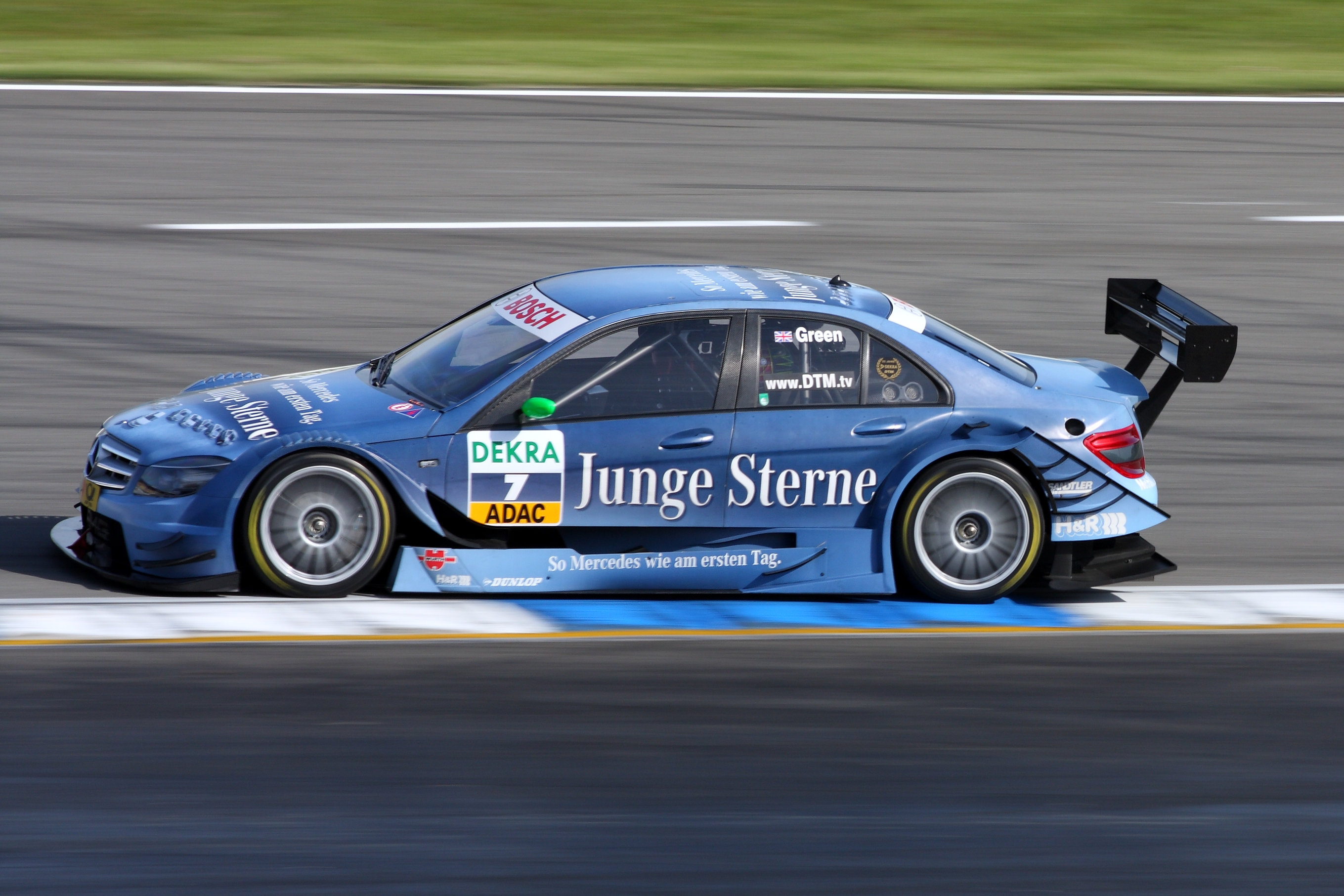
- Founded: 1993
- Folded: 2012
- Team principal(s): Ingmar Persson; Hans-Peter Naundorf
- Former series: Deutsche Tourenwagen Meisterschaft; FIA GT Championship; Deutsche Tourenwagen Masters

Persson Motorsport was an auto racing team based in Germany. Managed by Ingmar Persson, they have competed in the Deutsche Tourenwagen Masters (formerly Deutsche Tourenwagen Meisterschaft) since their formation in 1993 until 2012, running privateer Mercedes.

== History ==
In the old DTM, from 1993 to 1996, their drivers included Uwe Alzen and Bernd Mayländer. Over this period, Persson were the best privateer team, three years in succession between 1993 and 1995. When the DTM was postponed, they moved their focus to the FIA GT Championship racing Mercedes-Benz CLK GTRs in 1998, with Mayländer, Christophe Bouchut, Marcel Tiemann and Jean-Marc Gounon sharing driving duties.

The DTM was resurrected in 2000 and Persson returned with Tiemann and Peter Dumbreck in the Mercedes-Benz CLK DTM. In 2001 they gave future F1 driver Christijan Albers his DTM debut alongside Thomas Jäger. Katsutomo Kaneishi raced for the team in 2003, while Stefan Mücke and Markus Winkelhock raced for them in 2004.

In 2005 they gave future race-winners Bruno Spengler and Jamie Green their DTM debuts. Former F1 driver Jean Alesi raced for them in 2006 alongside Alexandros Margaritis and Mathias Lauda. Former champion Gary Paffett raced for the team in 2007 and 2008, winning at Motorsport Arena Oschersleben in 2007, ahead of Paul di Resta who raced for them in 2007 in a two-year-old car, finishing a stunning fifth in the standings. Unsurprisingly he was signed by the factory AMG-Mercedes team for 2008.

In 2009 Persson's drivers are British duo Jamie Green and Susie Stoddart, with Green winning the third round of the 2009 season at the Norisring.
