= 2003 Deutsche Tourenwagen Masters =

German touring car racing series

Champions
- Drivers' Champion: Bernd Schneider
- Teams' Champion: HWA Team I

Seasons
- ← 2002 2004 →

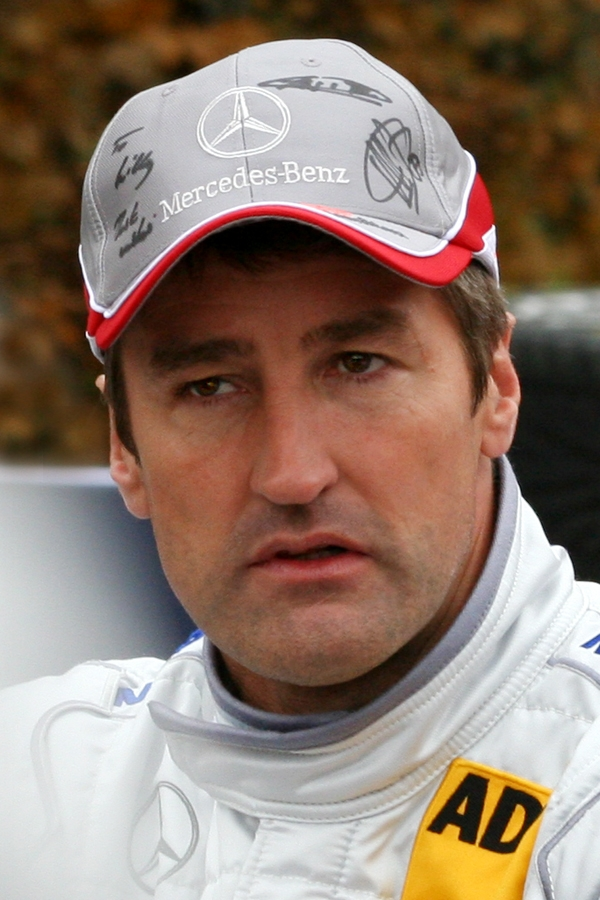
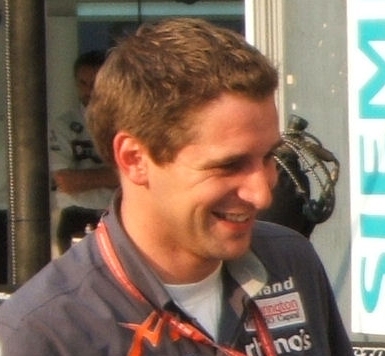
Bernd Schneider (left) won his third Deutsche Tourenwagen Masters Drivers' Championship while Christijan Albers (right) finished second in the championship.

The 2003 Deutsche Tourenwagen Masters was the seventeenth season of premier German touring car championship and also fourth season under the moniker of Deutsche Tourenwagen Masters since the series' resumption in 2000. Unlike 2002, there were ten race weekends with only one race at each event.

== Changes for 2003 ==
- The races were increased in length to a total of one hour per race, as compared to the 40 minutes each race had lasted in 2002.
- The race at Zolder, Belgium, was replaced by Adria in Italy.
- The DTM did not return to Sachsenring. Instead, Nürburgring hosted two events.
- The qualifying for Round 7 at Nürburgring was held at nighttime.

== Teams and drivers ==
The following manufacturers, teams and drivers competed in the 2003 Deutsche Tourenwagen Masters. All teams competed with tyres supplied by Dunlop.

Manufacturer	Car	Team	No.	Drivers	Rounds
Audi	Abt-Audi TT-R 2003	Abt Sportsline	1	(France) Laurent Aïello	All
Audi	Abt-Audi TT-R 2003	Abt Sportsline	2	(Germany) Christian Abt	All
Audi	Abt-Audi TT-R 2003	Abt Sportsline	5	(Sweden) Mattias Ekström	All
Audi	Abt-Audi TT-R 2003	Abt Sportsline	6	(Austria) Karl Wendlinger	All
Audi	Abt-Audi TT-R 2002	Abt Sportsline Junior Team	14	(Germany) Martin Tomczyk	All
Audi	Abt-Audi TT-R 2002	Abt Sportsline Junior Team	15	(Germany) Peter Terting	All
Mercedes-Benz	AMG-Mercedes CLK-DTM 2003	HWA Team	3	(Germany) Bernd Schneider	All
Mercedes-Benz	AMG-Mercedes CLK-DTM 2003	HWA Team	4	(Netherlands) Christijan Albers	All
Mercedes-Benz	AMG-Mercedes CLK-DTM 2003	HWA Team	9	(Switzerland) Marcel Fässler	All
Mercedes-Benz	AMG-Mercedes CLK-DTM 2003	HWA Team	10	(France) Jean Alesi	All
Mercedes-Benz	AMG-Mercedes CLK-DTM 2002	Persson Motorsport	11	(Germany) Thomas Jäger	All
Mercedes-Benz	AMG-Mercedes CLK-DTM 2002	Persson Motorsport	12	(Germany) Bernd Mayländer	All
Mercedes-Benz	AMG-Mercedes CLK-DTM 2002	Persson Motorsport	20	(Japan) Katsutomo Kaneishi	All
Mercedes-Benz	AMG-Mercedes CLK-DTM 2002	Team Rosberg	24	(Netherlands) Patrick Huisman	1–2
Mercedes-Benz	AMG-Mercedes CLK-DTM 2002	Team Rosberg	24	(United Kingdom) Gary Paffett	3–10
Mercedes-Benz	AMG-Mercedes CLK-DTM 2002	Team Rosberg	42	(Germany) Stefan Mücke	All
Opel	Opel Astra V8 Coupé 2003	OPC Team Holzer	7	(Germany) Manuel Reuter	All
Opel	Opel Astra V8 Coupé 2003	OPC Team Holzer	8	(Switzerland) Alain Menu	All
Opel	Opel Astra V8 Coupé 2002	OPC Euroteam	16	(Germany) Joachim Winkelhock	All
Opel	Opel Astra V8 Coupé 2002	OPC Euroteam	17	(Netherlands) Jeroen Bleekemolen	All
Opel	Opel Astra V8 Coupé 2003	OPC Team Phoenix	18	(Germany) Timo Scheider	All
Opel	Opel Astra V8 Coupé 2003	OPC Team Phoenix	19	(United Kingdom) Peter Dumbreck	All

=== Team changes ===
Abt Sportsline expanded from five to six cars with two cars run under the Abt Sportsline Junior Team banner, created to promote young drivers. Danish outfit First Choice Racing helped support the team during the 2003 season.

Persson Motorsport expanded to three cars.

Manthey Racing withdrew from the DTM after being part of the Mercedes squad since 2001.

=== Driver changes ===
Uwe Alzen had planned to continue with HWA Team in 2003 but decided to withdraw just days before the opening round of the season. In response, Mercedes promoted Christijan Albers from Team Rosberg to HWA Team, while Patrick Huisman took Albers vacant seat at Team Rosberg after driving for Manthey Racing.

Bernd Mayländer switched from Manthey Racing to Persson Motorsport.

Three time Japan Grand Touring car Championship winner Katsutomo Kaneishi joined the DTM with Persson Motorsport.

Martin Tomczyk moved to the Abt Sportsline Junior Team alongside debutant Peter Terting who had won the Volkswagen Lupo Cup in 2002.

Opel would shuffle around their drivers for 2003 with Manuel Reuter and Alain Menu moving to Team Holzer while Joachim Winkelhock went to Euroteam and Timo Scheider moved to Team Phoenix. Peter Dumbreck moved from Mercedes to Opel Team Phoenix while Jeroen Bleekemolen made his DTM debut with Opel Euroteam after finishing second in the Dutch Touring Car Championship.

Michael Bartels left the DTM to join the V8Star Series.

=== Mid season changes ===
Reigning German Formula Three Champion Gary Paffett replaced Patrick Huisman from the third round onwards.

== Race calendar and winners ==
Round	Circuit	Date	Pole position	Fastest Lap	Winning driver	Winning team	Winning manufacturer	TV
1	(Germany) Hockenheimring	27 April	(Germany) Bernd Schneider	(Germany) Bernd Schneider	(Germany) Bernd Schneider	Vodafone AMG-Mercedes	(Germany) Mercedes	ZDF
2	(Italy) Adria	11 May	(Switzerland) Marcel Fässler	(Germany) Bernd Schneider	(Netherlands) Christijan Albers	Express-Service AMG-Mercedes	(Germany) Mercedes	ARD
3	(Germany) Nürburgring	25 May	(Switzerland) Marcel Fässler	(Germany) Bernd Schneider	(Netherlands) Christijan Albers	Express-Service AMG-Mercedes	(Germany) Mercedes	ZDF
4	(Germany) EuroSpeedway	8 June	(Germany) Bernd Schneider	(Switzerland) Alain Menu	(Germany) Bernd Schneider	Vodafone AMG-Mercedes	(Germany) Mercedes	ZDF
5	(Germany) Norisring	22 June	(Germany) Bernd Schneider	(Germany) Bernd Schneider	(Netherlands) Christijan Albers	Express-Service AMG-Mercedes	(Germany) Mercedes	ARD
6	(United Kingdom) Donington Park	27 July	(Germany) Bernd Schneider	(Germany) Bernd Schneider	(France) Jean Alesi	AMG-Mercedes	(Germany) Mercedes	ZDF
7	(Germany) Nürburgring	17 August	(Sweden) Mattias Ekström	(United Kingdom) Peter Dumbreck	(France) Laurent Aïello	Hasseröder Abt-Audi	(Germany) Audi	ARD
8	(Austria) A1-Ring	7 September	(Switzerland) Marcel Fässler	(Germany) Bernd Schneider	(Switzerland) Marcel Fässler	AMG-Mercedes	(Germany) Mercedes	ARD
9	(Netherlands) Zandvoort	21 September	(Germany) Timo Scheider	(Netherlands) Christijan Albers	(Netherlands) Christijan Albers	Express-Service AMG-Mercedes	(Germany) Mercedes	ZDF
10	(Germany) Hockenheimring	5 October	(Sweden) Mattias Ekström	(Switzerland) Alain Menu	(France) Jean Alesi	AMG-Mercedes	(Germany) Mercedes	ARD

== Championship standings ==
=== Scoring system ===
Points are awarded to the top 8 classified finishers.

Position	**1st**	**2nd**	**3rd**	**4th**	**5th**	**6th**	**7th**	**8th**
Points	10	8	6	5	4	3	2	1

=== Drivers' championship ===
Pos	Driver	HOC (Germany)	ADR (Italy)	NÜR (Germany)	LAU (Germany)	NOR (Germany)	DON (United Kingdom)	NÜR (Germany)	A1R (Austria)	ZAN (Netherlands)	HOC (Germany)	Points
1	(Germany) Bernd Schneider	**1**	5	4	**1**	**3**	**2**	3	2	2	6	68
2	(Netherlands) Christijan Albers	5	1	1	7	1	5	2	3	1	12	64
3	(Switzerland) Marcel Fässler	2	**4**	**2**	10	2	4	5	**1**	6	3	57
4	(Sweden) Mattias Ekström	8	2	7	3	Ret	3	**4**	5	3	**2**	46
5	(France) Jean Alesi	4	7	Ret	5	5	1	6	Ret	5	1	42
6	(France) Laurent Aïello	3	3	3	8	6	Ret	1	4	9	5	41
7	(United Kingdom) Peter Dumbreck	6	6	5	2	4	6	10	Ret	10	4	31
8	(Germany) Timo Scheider	7	15	13	4	16	8	7	Ret	**Ret**	7	12
9	(Switzerland) Alain Menu	18	8	6	6	10	Ret	9	7	Ret	10	9
10	(Germany) Manuel Reuter	9	Ret	9	12	13	Ret	15†	10	4	19†	5
11	(United Kingdom) Gary Paffett			Ret	15	Ret	9	8	6	12	18†	4
12	(Germany) Christian Abt	20†	DSQ	8	9	7	Ret	Ret	Ret	11	9	3
13	(Germany) Thomas Jäger	10	Ret	12	14	9	7	Ret	9	13	11	2
14	(Netherlands) Jeroen Bleekemolen	14	11	11	18†	14	13	17†	12	7	15	2
15	(Germany) Joachim Winkelhock	16	9	10	11	8	10	13	14	15	Ret	1
16	(Austria) Karl Wendlinger	15	12	16	13	11	15	11	16	8	17	1
17	(Germany) Peter Terting	Ret	13	14	DNS	12	14	18†	13	14	8	1
18	(Germany) Martin Tomczyk	12	Ret	18	DNS	Ret	Ret	Ret	8	Ret	13	1
19	(Germany) Bernd Mayländer	11	10	17	16	Ret	12	14	15	16	20†	0
20	(Germany) Stefan Mücke	17	Ret	15	DNS	15	11	12	11	17	14	0
21	(Netherlands) Patrick Huisman	13	Ret									0
22	(Japan) Katsutomo Kaneishi	19	14	19	17	17†	Ret	16†	17	18	16	0
Pos	Driver	HOC (Germany)	ADR (Italy)	NÜR (Germany)	LAU (Germany)	NOR (Germany)	DON (United Kingdom)	NÜR (Germany)	A1R (Austria)	ZAN (Netherlands)	HOC (Germany)	Points

Colour	Result
Gold	Winner
Silver	Second place
Bronze	Third place
Green	Points classification
Blue	Non-points classification
Blue	Non-classified finish (NC)
Purple	Retired, not classified (Ret)
Red	Did not qualify (DNQ)
Red	Did not pre-qualify (DNPQ)
Black	Disqualified (DSQ)
White	Did not start (DNS)
White	Withdrew (WD)
White	Race cancelled (C)
Blank	Did not practice (DNP)
Blank	Did not arrive (DNA)
Blank	Excluded (EX)

**Bold** – Pole
Italics – Fastest Lap

- † — Driver retired, but was classified as they completed 90% of the winner's race distance.

=== Teams' championship ===
Pos.	Team	No.	HOC (Germany)	ADR (Italy)	NÜR (Germany)	LAU (Germany)	NOR (Germany)	DON (United Kingdom)	NÜR (Germany)	A1R (Austria)	ZAN (Netherlands)	HOC (Germany)	Points
1	Vodafone / Express-Service AMG-Mercedes	3	**1**	5	4	**1**	**3**	**2**	3	2	2	6	132
1	Vodafone / Express-Service AMG-Mercedes	4	5	1	1	7	1	5	2	3	1	12	132
2	AMG-Mercedes	9	2	**4**	**2**	10	2	4	5	**1**	6	3	99
2	AMG-Mercedes	10	4	7	Ret	5	5	1	6	Ret	5	1	99
3	PlayStation 2 Red Bull Abt-Audi	5	8	2	7	3	Ret	3	**4**	5	3	**2**	47
3	PlayStation 2 Red Bull Abt-Audi	6	15	12	16	13	11	15	11	16	8	17	47
4	Hasseröder Abt-Audi	1	3	3	3	8	6	Ret	1	4	9	5	44
4	Hasseröder Abt-Audi	2	20†	DSQ	8	9	7	Ret	Ret	Ret	11	9	44
5	OPC Team Phoenix	18	7	15	13	4	16	8	7	Ret	**Ret**	7	43
5	OPC Team Phoenix	19	6	6	5	2	4	6	10	Ret	10	4	43
6	OPC Team Holzer	7	9	Ret	9	12	13	Ret	15†	10	4	19†	14
6	OPC Team Holzer	8	18	8	6	6	10	Ret	9	7	Ret	10	14
7	Service 24h AMG-Mercedes	24	13	Ret	Ret	15	Ret	9	8	6	12	18†	4
7	Service 24h AMG-Mercedes	42	17	Ret	15	DNS	15	11	12	11	17	14	4
8	OPC Euroteam	16	16	9	10	11	8	10	13	14	15	Ret	3
8	OPC Euroteam	17	14	11	11	18†	14	13	17†	12	7	15	3
9	Original-Teile AMG-Mercedes	11	10	Ret	12	14	9	7	Ret	9	13	11	2
9	Original-Teile AMG-Mercedes	12	11	10	17	16	Ret	12	14	15	16	20†	2
10	S Line Audi Junior Team	14	12	Ret	18	DNS	Ret	Ret	Ret	8	Ret	13	2
10	S Line Audi Junior Team	15	Ret	13	14	DNS	12	14	18†	13	14	8	2
11	ARTA AMG-Mercedes	20	19	14	19	17	17†	Ret	16†	17	18	16	0
Pos.	Team	No.	HOC (Germany)	ADR (Italy)	NÜR (Germany)	LAU (Germany)	NOR (Germany)	DON (United Kingdom)	NÜR (Germany)	A1R (Austria)	ZAN (Netherlands)	HOC (Germany)	Points

=== Manufacturers' championship ===
Pos.	Manufacturer	HOC (Germany)	ADR (Italy)	NÜR (Germany)	LAU (Germany)	NOR (Germany)	DON (United Kingdom)	NÜR (Germany)	A1R (Austria)	ZAN (Netherlands)	HOC (Germany)	Points
1	Mercedes	27	21	23	16	28	29	22	27	25	19	237
2	Audi	7	14	9	7	5	6	15	10	7	13	93
3	Opel	5	4	7	16	6	4	2	2	7	7	60
Pos.	Manufacturer	HOC (Germany)	ADR (Italy)	NÜR (Germany)	LAU (Germany)	NOR (Germany)	DON (United Kingdom)	NÜR (Germany)	A1R (Austria)	ZAN (Netherlands)	HOC (Germany)	Points

== Bibliography ==
- Dietzel, André (November 2003). Tourenwagen Story 2003: Die Rennen, die Fahrer, die Technik (in German). Königswinter: Heel Verlag. ISBN 978-3-89365-991-3.
