= HWA Team =

German auto racing team

(Germany) HWA Team
- Founded: 1999
- Founder(s): Hans-Werner Aufrecht
- Base: Affalterbach, Germany
- Former series: DTM; Formula E FIA Formula 3 Championship; FIA Formula 2 Championship
- Teams' Championships: DTM: 2000-2003, 2005, 2006, 2008-2010, 2015, 2018
- Drivers' Championships: DTM: 2000: Bernd Schneider; 2001: Bernd Schneider; 2003: Bernd Schneider; 2005: Gary Paffett; 2006: Bernd Schneider; 2010: Paul di Resta; 2015: Pascal Wehrlein; 2018: Gary Paffett
- Website: https://www.hwaag.com

HWA Team, also known as HWA RACELAB, is the auto racing team of HWA AG, a German company based in Affalterbach, that also develops and builds vehicles and components for Mercedes-AMG race cars. It is named after founder Hans-Werner Aufrecht.

== History ==
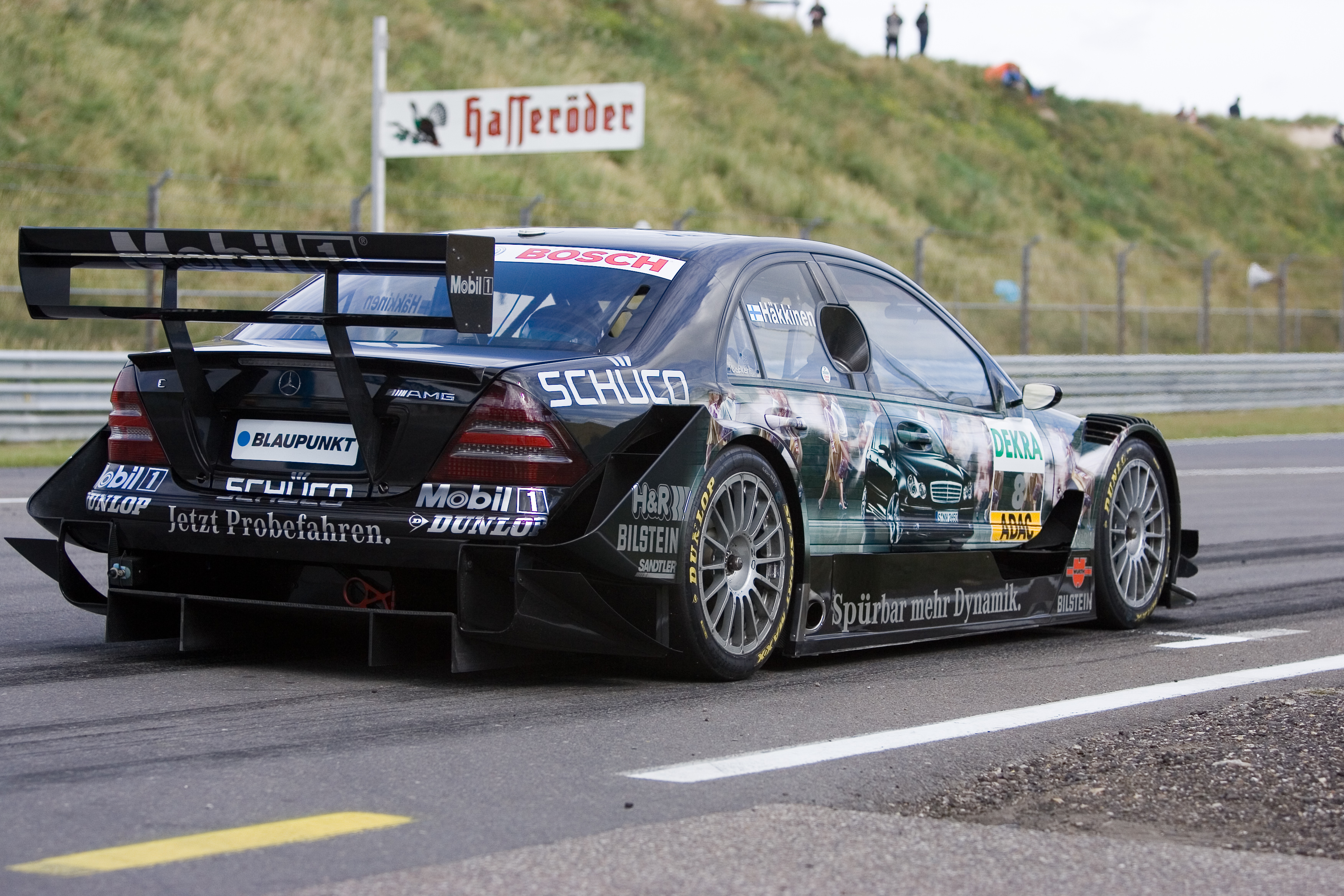
The HWA Team Mercedes-Benz AMG C-Klasse 2005 at Zandvoort, driven by 2-time Formula 1 world champion Mika Häkkinen

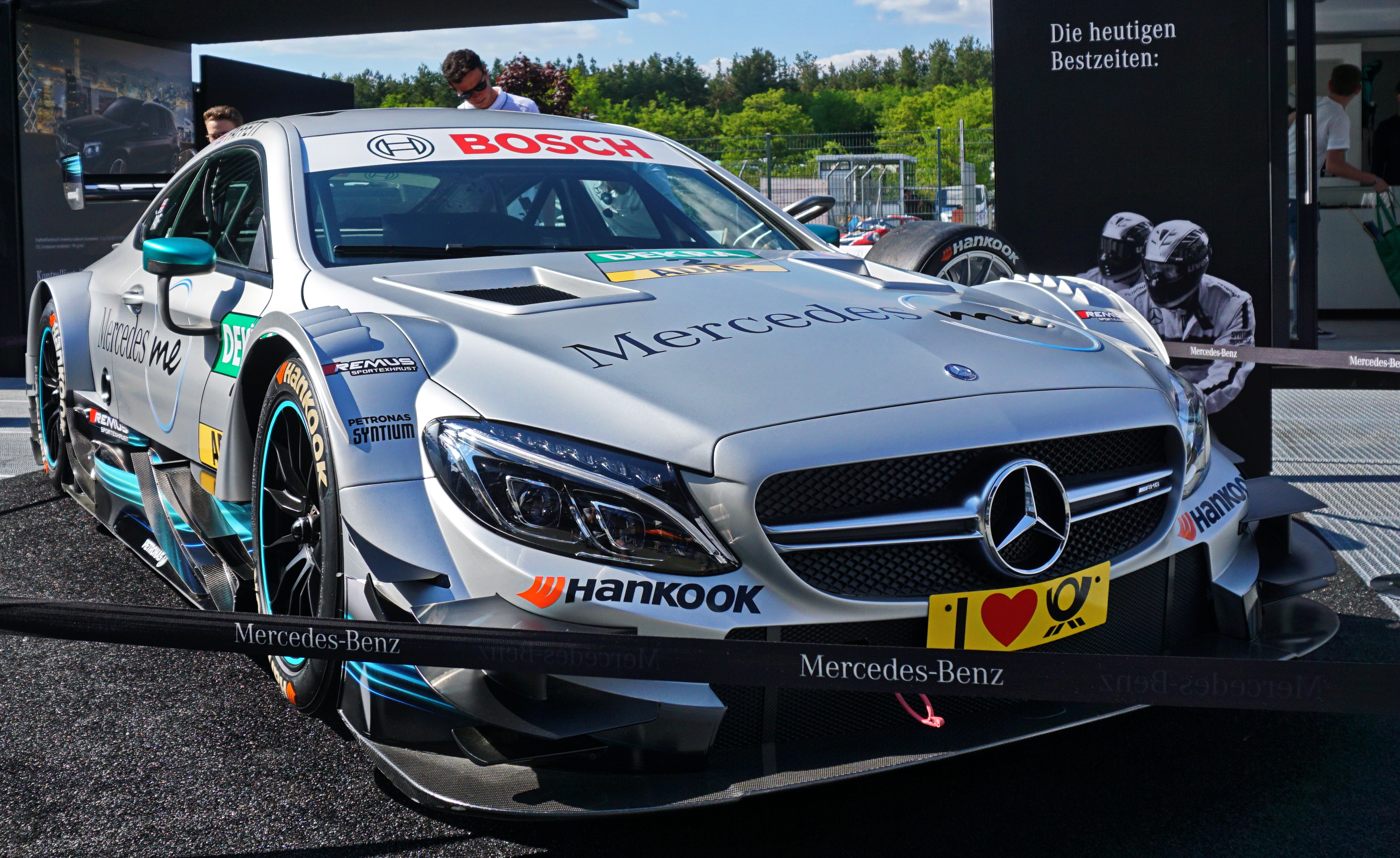
The HWA Team Mercedes-AMG C63 DTM that was driven by Gary Paffett, on display at the Hockenheimring

HWA was responsible for managing the AMG Mercedes team in the Deutsche Tourenwagen Masters (DTM). HWA AG was founded in 1999, and takes its name from Hans-Werner Aufrecht, who established AMG in 1967. Towards the end of 1998 Aufrecht sold a majority interest in AMG to DaimlerChrysler AG. As part of the process, the motor racing department and parts of the customised vehicles construction business were spun off and transferred to HWA AG.

Between 1998 and 1999, HWA carried out the production of the Mercedes Benz CLK-GTR Straßenversion, building 20 cars with a further six roadster models built from spare parts in 2002.

It was announced on 9 May 2018 that HWA would join Formula E for the 2018-19 season. Their drivers were to be Gary Paffett, their reigning DTM champion and former McLaren Formula One driver Stoffel Vandoorne. For the 2019-20 season, Mercedes joined Formula E in an official capacity by taking over the HWA entry and renaming it to Mercedes-EQ Formula E Team.

In October 2018, HWA was named as one of ten teams that would make up the grid for the inaugural season of the newly rebranded FIA Formula 3 Championship. In January 2019, the team entered into a partnership with Arden International for the FIA Formula 2 Championship. On 16 October 2019 it was announced that HWA would take over Arden's entry completely for the 2020 Season following their withdrawal. The following month, the team named incumbent Arden driver Artem Markelov as their first driver.

In October 2021, it was announced that HWA will leave the FIA Formula 3 Championship after three seasons, during which they claimed four wins and 10 podiums. Their assets were purchased by Van Amersfoort Racing.

For the 2024 FIA World Endurance Championship, HWA provided the research and development efforts for the Isotta Fraschini Tipo 6 LMH-C's 3.0-liter single turbo V6. The car made its maiden start in the season-opening 2024 Qatar 1812 km.

== Racing results ==
=== FIA Formula E Championship ===
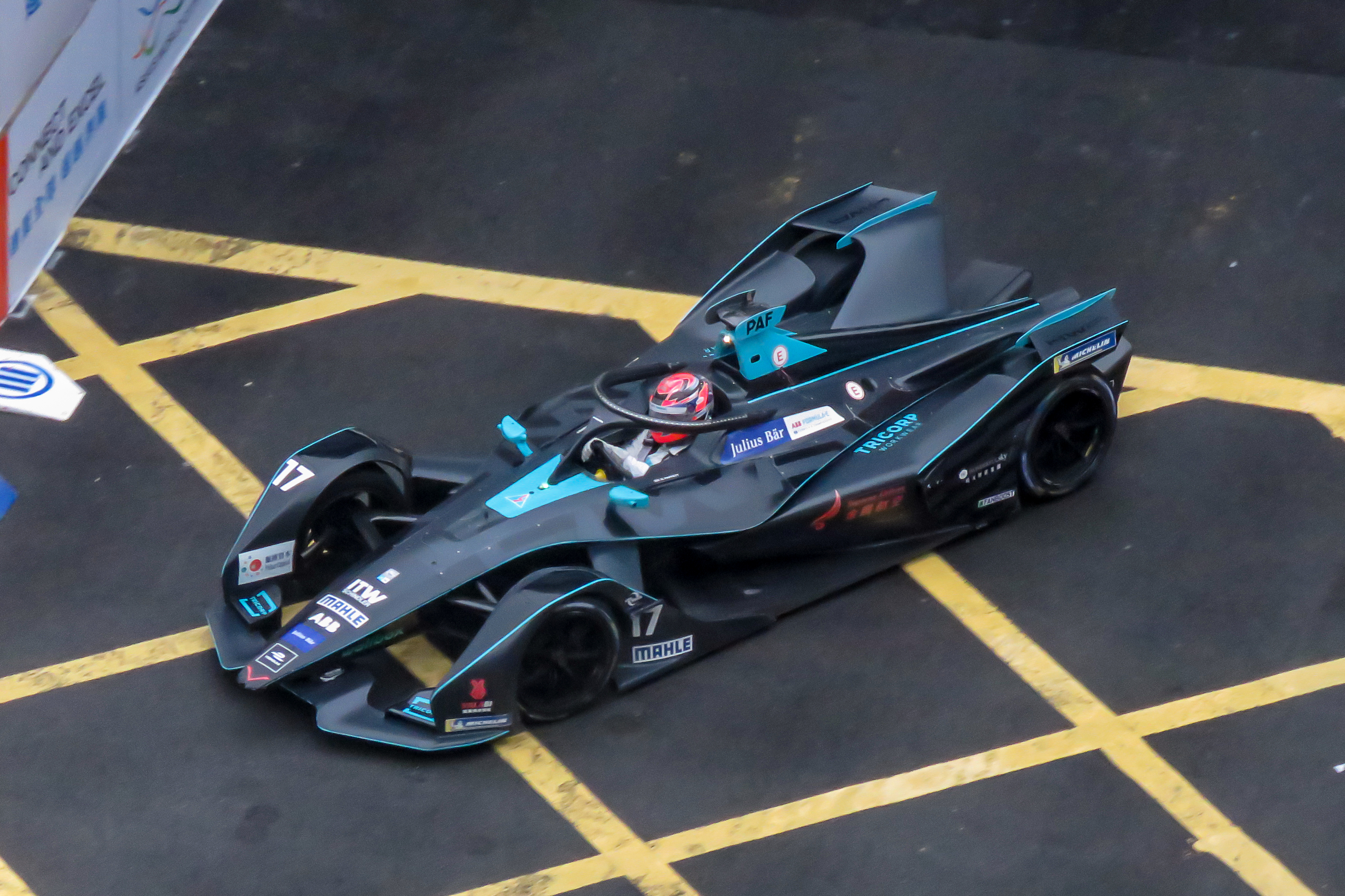
The HWA-Venturi Spark SRT05e driven by Gary Paffett at the 2019 Hong Kong ePrix

(key) (Races in bold indicate pole position) (Races in italics indicate fastest lap)

Year	Chassis	Powertrain	Tyres	No.	Drivers	1	2	3	4	5	6	7	8	9	10	11	12	13	Points	T.C.
HWA Racelab
2018–19	Spark SRT05e	Venturi VFE05	**M**			ADR	MRK	SCL	MEX	HKG	SYX	RME	PAR	MCO	BER	BRN	NYC		44	9th
2018–19	Spark SRT05e	Venturi VFE05	**M**	5	(Belgium) Stoffel Vandoorne	17	Ret	Ret	18	**Ret**	Ret	3	Ret	9	5	10	13	10	44	9th
2018–19	Spark SRT05e	Venturi VFE05	**M**	17	(United Kingdom) Gary Paffett	Ret	Ret	14	16	8	Ret	Ret	8	12	16	17	11	8	44	9th
2019–20: Mercedes-Benz EQ Formula E Team

=== FIA Formula 2 Championship ===
The BWT HWA Racelab Dallara F2 2018 driven by Théo Pourchaire at the Bahrain International Circuit

Year	Chassis	Engine	Tyres	Drivers	Races	Wins	Poles	F. Laps	Podiums	D.C.	Pts	T.C.	Pts
2020	Dallara; F2 2018	Mecachrome; V634T V6 t	P	(Russia) Artem Markelov	23	0	0	0	0	18th	5	10th	13
2020	Dallara; F2 2018	Mecachrome; V634T V6 t	P	(France) Giuliano Alesi	18	0	0	1	0	17th	12 (Note: 8 points scored for HWA Racelab.)	10th	13
2020	Dallara; F2 2018	Mecachrome; V634T V6 t	P	(United Kingdom) Jake Hughes	2	0	0	0	0	23rd	0	10th	13
2020	Dallara; F2 2018	Mecachrome; V634T V6 t	P	(France) Théo Pourchaire	4	0	0	0	0	26th	0	10th	13
2021	Dallara; F2 2018	Mecachrome; V634T V6 t	P	(Italy) Matteo Nannini	3	0	0	0	0	22nd	1	11th	9
2021	Dallara; F2 2018	Mecachrome; V634T V6 t	P	(United Kingdom) Jack Aitken	9	0	0	0	0	23rd	0	11th	9
2021	Dallara; F2 2018	Mecachrome; V634T V6 t	P	(United Kingdom) Jake Hughes	8	0	0	0	0	18th	8	11th	9
2021	Dallara; F2 2018	Mecachrome; V634T V6 t	P	(United States) Logan Sargeant	3	0	0	0	0	29th	0	11th	9
2021	Dallara; F2 2018	Mecachrome; V634T V6 t	P	(Italy) Alessio Deledda	23	0	0	0	0	25th	0	11th	9

==== In detail ====
(key) (Races in bold indicate pole position) (Races in italics indicate fastest lap)

Year	Drivers	1	2	3	4	5	6	7	8	9	10	11	12	13	14	15	16	17	18	19	20	21	22	23	24	T.C.	Points
2020		RBR; FEA	RBR; SPR	RBR; FEA	RBR; SPR	HUN; FEA	HUN; SPR	SIL; FEA	SIL; SPR	SIL; FEA	SIL; SPR	CAT; FEA	CAT; SPR	SPA; FEA	SPA; SPR	MNZ; FEA	MNZ; SPR	MUG; FEA	MUG; SPR	SOC; FEA	SOC; SPR	BHR; FEA	BHR; SPR	BHR; FEA	BHR; SPR	10th	13
2020	(Russia) Artem Markelov	Ret	18	DNS	16	Ret	14	18	11	19	11	12	16	16	8	17	16	8	20	15	12	22	10	13	20	10th	13
2020	(France) Giuliano Alesi	6	Ret	21	15	11	10	19	18	16	20	Ret	19	18	14	18	12	Ret	Ret							10th	13
2020	(United Kingdom) Jake Hughes																			12	Ret					10th	13
2020	(France) Théo Pourchaire																					18	Ret	18	21	10th	13
2021		BHR; SP1	BHR; SP2	BHR; FEA	MON; SP1	MON; SP2	MON; FEA	BAK; SP1	BAK; SP2	BAK; FEA	SIL; SP1	SIL; SP2	SIL; FEA	MNZ; SP1	MNZ; SP2	MNZ; FEA	SOC; SP1	SOC; SP2	SOC; FEA	JED; SP1	JED; SP2	JED; FEA	YMC; SP1	YMC; SP2	YMC; FEA	11th	9
2021	(Italy) Matteo Nannini	14	9	10																						11th	9
2021	(United Kingdom) Jack Aitken				16	9	18	Ret	12	11	17	18	17													11th	9
2021	(United Kingdom) Jake Hughes													12	Ret	13	4	C	18				Ret	13	Ret	11th	9
2021	(United States) Logan Sargeant																			16	Ret	14				11th	9
2021	(Italy) Alessio Deledda	18	Ret	Ret	18	12	17	Ret	15	19	Ret	Ret	22	13	19	Ret	18	C	17	Ret	Ret	20	18	Ret	19	11th	9

=== FIA Formula 3 Championship ===
Year	Chassis	Engine	Tyres	Drivers	Races	Wins	Poles	F. Laps	Podiums	D.C.	Pts	T.C.	Pts
2019	Dallara; F3 2019	Mecachrome; V634 V6	P	(Netherlands) Bent Viscaal	16	0	0	0	0	15th	10	5th	100
2019	Dallara; F3 2019	Mecachrome; V634 V6	P	(United Kingdom) Jake Hughes	16	1	1	1	4	7th	90	5th	100
2019	Dallara; F3 2019	Mecachrome; V634 V6	P	(Iran) Keyvan Andres	15	0	0	0	0	28th	0	5th	100
2020	Dallara; F3 2019	Mecachrome; V634 V6	P	(Brazil) Enzo Fittipaldi	18	0	0	0	0	15th	27	5th	138.5
2020	Dallara; F3 2019	Mecachrome; V634 V6	P	(United Kingdom) Jake Hughes	18	2	0	3	4	7th	111.5	5th	138.5
2020	Dallara; F3 2019	Mecachrome; V634 V6	P	(Australia) Jack Doohan	18	0	0	0	0	26th	0	5th	138.5
2021	Dallara; F3 2019	Mecachrome; V634 V6	P	(Italy) Matteo Nannini	20	1	0	1	2	14th	44	7th	44
2021	Dallara; F3 2019	Mecachrome; V634 V6	P	(Denmark) Oliver Rasmussen	20	0	0	0	0	25th	0	7th	44
2021	Dallara; F3 2019	Mecachrome; V634 V6	P	(Mexico) Rafael Villagómez	20	0	0	0	0	29th	0	7th	44

==== In detail ====
(key) (Races in bold indicate pole position) (Races in italics indicate fastest lap)

Year	Drivers	1	2	3	4	5	6	7	8	9	10	11	12	13	14	15	16	17	18	19	20	21	T.C.	Points
2019		CAT; FEA	CAT; SPR	LEC; FEA	LEC; SPR	RBR; FEA	RBR; SPR	SIL; FEA	SIL; SPR	HUN; FEA	HUN; SPR	SPA; FEA	SPA; SPR	MNZ; FEA	MNZ; SPR	SOC; FEA	SOC; SPR						5th	100
2019	(Netherlands) Bent Viscaal	13	13	5	20	13	Ret	22	20	19	10	20	14	17	27^{†}	Ret	17						5th	100
2019	(United Kingdom) Jake Hughes	17	Ret	**Ret**	7	7	1	9	Ret	3	3	21	Ret	6	3	7	4						5th	100
2019	(Iran) Keyvan Andres	28	18	DNS	19	27	13	21	26	23	14	14	16	19	22	19	23						5th	100
2020		RBR; FEA	RBR; SPR	RBR; FEA	RBR; SPR	HUN; FEA	HUN; SPR	SIL; FEA	SIL; SPR	SIL; FEA	SIL; SPR	CAT; FEA	CAT; SPR	SPA; FEA	SPA; SPR	MNZ; FEA	MNZ; SPR	MUG; FEA	MUG; SPR				5th	138.5
2020	(Brazil) Enzo Fittipaldi	18	9	15	13	19	9	18	19	17	17	13	8	26	12	9	19	5	4				5th	138.5
2020	(United Kingdom) Jake Hughes	28	12	10	Ret	24	19	4	10	2	7	1	10	Ret	17	5	1	2	6				5th	138.5
2020	(Australia) Jack Doohan	14	Ret	22	19	Ret	25	Ret	27	26	21	14	15	12	Ret	17	21	13	11				5th	138.5
2021		CAT; SP1	CAT; SP2	CAT; FEA	LEC; SP1	LEC; SP2	LEC; FEA	RBR; SP1	RBR; SP2	RBR; FEA	HUN; SP1	HUN; SP2	HUN; FEA	SPA; SP1	SPA; SP2	SPA; FEA	ZAN; SP1	ZAN; SP2	ZAN; FEA	SOC; SP1	SOC; SP2	SOC; FEA	7th	44
2021	(Italy) Matteo Nannini	10	26^{†}	3	22	13	20	23	12	5	10	1	25	19	Ret	26	17	9	28	16	C	17	7th	44
2021	(Denmark) Oliver Rasmussen	Ret	19	17	17	21	22	26	16	22	18	28	21	20	21	17	18	12	26	Ret	C	25^{†}	7th	44
2021	(Mexico) Rafael Villagómez	19	18	28	25	27	23	21	18	19	23	21	24	27	24	Ret	22	13	25	20	C	Ret	7th	44

=== DTM Championship results ===
==== Car No. 1 results ====
Year	Driver	No.	Make	1	2	3	4	5	6	7	8	9	10	11	12	13	14	15	16	17	18	19	20	Position	Pts
2000	Bernd Schneider	1	AMG-Mercedes CLK-DTM 2000	**HOC**; **1**; 1	**HOC**; **2**; 1	OSC; 1; 3	OSC; 2; 12	NOR; 1; 4	NOR; 2; 1	SAC; 1; 3	SAC; 2; 3	**NÜR**; **1**; 1	**NÜR**; **2**; 1	**LAU**; **1** C	LAU; 2 C	**OSC**; **1**; 2	OSC; 2; 1	NÜR; 1; 2	NÜR; 2; 4	HOC; 1; 2	HOC; 2 NC			1st	221
2001	Bernd Schneider	1	AMG-Mercedes CLK-DTM 2001	**HOC**; **QR**; 1	**HOC**; **CR**; 1	NÜR; QR; 6	NÜR; CR; 2	OSC; QR; 3	OSC; CR; 2	SAC; QR; 4	SAC; CR; 1	**NOR**; **QR**; 1	**NOR**; **CR**; 2	LAU; QR; 3	LAU; CR; 2	NÜR; QR; 4	NÜR; CR; 6	**A1R**; **QR**; 1	**A1R**; **CR**; 1	ZAN; QR; 10	ZAN; CR; 3	HOC; QR; Ret	HOC; CR; 3	1st	161
2002	Bernd Schneider	1	AMG-Mercedes CLK-DTM 2002	HOC; QR; 11	HOC; CR; 4	ZOL; QR; 6	ZOL; CR; 3	DON; QR; 8	DON; CR; 12	SAC; QR; 3	SAC; CR; 2	NOR; QR; 3	NOR; CR; 2	LAU; QR; 2	LAU; CR; 1	NÜR; QR; 3	NÜR; CR; 3	A1R; QR; 2	A1R; CR; 2	ZAN; QR; 6	ZAN; CR; 2	**HOC**; **QR**; 2	HOC; CR; 1	2nd	64
2003	Bernd Schneider	3	AMG-Mercedes CLK-DTM 2003	**HOC**; 1	ADR; 5	NÜR; 4	**LAU**; 1	**NOR**; 3	**DON**; 2	NÜR; 3	A1R; 2	ZAN; 2	HOC; 6											1st	68
2004	Bernd Schneider	1	AMG-Mercedes CLK-DTM 2004	HOC; 17†	EST; 5	ADR; 11	LAU; 3	NOR; 3	SHA; 2^{‡}	NÜR; 3	OSC; Ret	ZAN; 5	BRN; 10	HOC; 1										6th	36
2005	Bernd Schneider	7	AMG-Mercedes CLK-DTM 2005	HOC; 3	LAU; 17†	SPA; 17†	BRN; Ret	OSC; 4	NOR; 10	NÜR; 5	**ZAN**; 8	LAU; Ret	IST; 3	HOC; 1										4th	32
2006	Bernd Schneider	2	AMG-Mercedes CLK-DTM 2006	HOC; 1	LAU; 1	OSC; 5	BRH; 3	NOR; 2	NÜR; 2	ZAN; 2	CAT; 2	BUG; 5	HOC; 4											1st	71

== Timeline ==
Current series
Nürburgring Langstrecken-Serie	2026–present
Former series
Deutsche Tourenwagen Masters	2000–2019
Formula E	2018–2019
FIA Formula 3 Championship	2019–2021
FIA Formula 2 Championship	2020–2021
