= 2003 Masters of Formula 3 =

Thirteenth Masters of Formula 3 race held at Circuit Park Zandvoort

Race details
Date	10 August 2003
Official name	Marlboro Masters of Formula 3
Location	Circuit Park Zandvoort, Netherlands
Course	4.307 km (2.676 mi)
Distance	25 laps, 107.675 km (66.906 mi)

Pole
Driver	(Brazil) Nelson Piquet Jr.	Piquet Sports
Time	1.33.115

Fastest Lap
Driver	(Australia) Ryan Briscoe	Prema Powerteam
Time	1.35.693 (on lap 20 of 25)

Podium
First	(Austria) Christian Klien	ADAC Berlin Brandenburg
Second	(Brazil) Nelson Piquet Jr.	Piquet Sports
Third	(Australia) Ryan Briscoe	Prema Powerteam

The 2003 Marlboro Masters of Formula 3 was the thirteenth Masters of Formula 3 race held at Circuit Park Zandvoort on 10 August 2003. It was won by Christian Klien, for ADAC Berlin Brandenburg.

== Drivers and teams ==
2003 Entry List
Team	No	Driver	Chassis (Note: All drivers competed in Dallara chassis; model listed.)	Engine	Main series
(France) Signature-Plus	1	(Brazil) Fabio Carbone	F302	Renault	Formula 3 Euro Series
(France) Signature-Plus	2	(France) Nicolas Lapierre	F302	Renault	Formula 3 Euro Series
(Italy) Prema Powerteam	3	(Australia) Ryan Briscoe	F303	Opel	Formula 3 Euro Series
(Italy) Prema Powerteam	4	(Poland) Robert Kubica	F303	Opel	Formula 3 Euro Series
(Italy) Prema Powerteam	6	(Japan) Katsuyuki Hiranaka	F303	Opel	Formula 3 Euro Series
(Brazil) Piquet Sports	7	(Brazil) Nelson Piquet Jr.	F303	Mugen-Honda	British Formula 3
(United Kingdom) Carlin Motorsport	8	(South Africa) Alan van der Merwe	F302	Mugen-Honda	British Formula 3
(United Kingdom) Carlin Motorsport	9	(United Kingdom) Jamie Green	F302	Mugen-Honda	British Formula 3
(United Kingdom) Carlin Motorsport	10	(United States) Richard Antinucci	F302	Mugen-Honda	British Formula 3
(United Kingdom) Carlin Motorsport	11	(Denmark) Ronnie Bremer	F302	Mugen-Honda	British Formula 3
(France) ASM	12	(France) Olivier Pla	F303	Mercedes	Formula 3 Euro Series
(France) ASM	14	(Canada) Bruno Spengler	F303	Mercedes	Formula 3 Euro Series
(France) ASM	15	(France) Alexandre Prémat	F303	Mercedes	Formula 3 Euro Series
(Italy) Target Racing	16	(Italy) Omar Galeffi	F302	Opel	Italian Formula Three
(Italy) Target Racing	17	(Italy) Fausto Ippoliti	F302	Opel	Italian Formula Three
(Italy) Lucidi Motors	18	(Belgium) Gregory Franchi	F302	Opel	Italian Formula Three
(Italy) Team Ghinzani Euroc S.A.M.	19	(Netherlands) Robert Doornbos	F302	Mugen-Honda	Formula 3 Euro Series
(Italy) Team Ghinzani Euroc S.A.M.	20	(Portugal) Álvaro Parente	F302	Mugen-Honda	Formula 3 Euro Series
(Italy) Team Ghinzani Euroc S.A.M.	21	(Austria) Philipp Baron	F302	Mugen-Honda	Formula 3 Euro Series
(Germany) ADAC Berlin Brandenburg	22	(Austria) Christian Klien	F302	Mercedes	Formula 3 Euro Series
(Germany) ADAC Berlin Brandenburg	23	(Germany) Markus Winkelhock	F302	Mercedes	Formula 3 Euro Series
(Germany) Team Rosberg	24	(Austria) Andreas Zuber	F303	Opel	Formula 3 Euro Series
(Germany) Team Rosberg	25	(Finland) Nico Rosberg	F303	Opel	Formula 3 Euro Series
(Germany) Kolles	26	(Netherlands) Charles Zwolsman Jr.	F303	Mercedes	Formula 3 Euro Series
(Germany) Kolles	27	(Belgium) Jan Heylen	F302	Mercedes	Formula 3 Euro Series
(Luxembourg) Superfund TME	28	(Austria) Bernhard Auinger	F302	Toyota	Formula 3 Euro Series
(Luxembourg) Superfund TME	29	(Japan) Sakon Yamamoto	F302	Toyota	Formula 3 Euro Series
(Italy) Team Corbetta/Ombra	30	(Italy) Stefano Gattuso	F302	Mugen-Honda	Italian Formula Three
(Italy) Team Corbetta/Ombra	31	(Italy) Davide Mazzoleni	F302	Mugen-Honda	Italian Formula Three
(United Kingdom) Alan Docking Racing	33	(Australia) Will Davison	F302	Mugen-Honda	British Formula 3
(United Kingdom) Alan Docking Racing	34	(Brazil) João Paulo de Oliveira	F302	Mugen-Honda	British Formula 3
(United Kingdom) Manor Motorsport	35	(Monaco) Clivio Piccione	F302	Mugen-Honda	British Formula 3
(United Kingdom) Manor Motorsport	36	(Italy) Stefano Fabi	F302	Mugen-Honda	British Formula 3
(United Kingdom) Manor Motorsport	37	(Thailand) Tor Graves	F302	Mugen-Honda	British Formula 3
(United Kingdom) Hitech Racing	38	(United Kingdom) Danny Watts	F302	Renault	British Formula 3
(United Kingdom) Hitech Racing	39	(France) Eric Salignon	F302	Renault	British Formula 3
(United Kingdom) Hitech Racing	40	(United Kingdom) Andrew Thompson	F302	Renault	British Formula 3
(Switzerland) Opel Team KMS	41	(Germany) Timo Glock	F303	Opel	Formula 3 Euro Series
(United Kingdom) Menu F3 Motorsport	42	(United Kingdom) Adam Carroll	F302	Opel	British Formula 3
(United Kingdom) Menu F3 Motorsport	43	(Canada) Billy Asaro	F302	Opel	British Formula 3
(Switzerland) Swiss Racing Team	45	(Portugal) César Campaniço	F302	Opel	Formula 3 Euro Series
(Switzerland) Swiss Racing Team	46	(Germany) Marcel Lasée	F302	Opel	Formula 3 Euro Series
(United Kingdom) Fortec Motorsport	48	(Venezuela) Ernesto Viso	F302	Renault	British Formula 3
(United Kingdom) Fortec Motorsport	49	(Sweden) Robert Dahlgren	F302	Renault	British Formula 3
(United Kingdom) MB Racing Performance	50	(Germany) Daniel la Rosa	F302	Opel	Formula 3 Euro Series
(United Kingdom) MB Racing Performance	51	(Greece) Alexandros Margaritis	F302	Opel	Formula 3 Euro Series
(Italy) Imola Racing	53	(Italy) Giacomo Piccini	F302	Opel	Italian Formula Three

== Classification ==
=== Race ===
Pos	No	Driver	Team	Laps	Time/Retired	Grid
1	22	(Austria) Christian Klien	ADAC Berlin Brandenburg	25	0:44.32.801	2
2	7	(Brazil) Nelson Piquet Jr.	Piquet Sports	25	+0.321	1
3	3	(Australia) Ryan Briscoe	Prema Powerteam	25	+3.006	3
4	2	(France) Nicolas Lapierre	Signature-Plus	25	+9.518	4
5	9	(United Kingdom) Jamie Green	Carlin Motorsport	25	+15.138	5
6	23	(Germany) Markus Winkelhock	ADAC Berlin Brandenburg	25	+15.731	7
7	12	(France) Olivier Pla	ASM	25	+16.243	8
8	8	(South Africa) Alan van der Merwe	Carlin Motorsport	25	+16.585	12
9	15	(France) Alexandre Prémat	ASM	25	+17.210	9
10	1	(Brazil) Fabio Carbone	Signature-Plus	25	+17.810	13
11	11	(Denmark) Ronnie Bremer	Carlin Motorsport	25	+18.063	15
12	34	(Brazil) João Paulo de Oliveira	Alan Docking Racing	25	+18.540	18
13	42	(United Kingdom) Adam Carroll	Menu F3 Motorsport	25	+19.298	6
14	49	(Sweden) Robert Dahlgren	Fortec Motorsport	25	+19.877	18
15	50	(Germany) Daniel la Rosa	MB Racing Performance	25	+22.132	16
16	33	(Australia) Will Davison	Alan Docking Racing	25	+22.410	27
17	27	(Belgium) Jan Heylen	Kolles	25	+23.835	25
18	19	(Netherlands) Robert Doornbos	Team Ghinzani Euroc S.A.M.	25	+24.384	29
19	35	(Monaco) Clivio Piccione	Manor Motorsport	25	+24.804	23
20	36	(Italy) Stefano Fabi	Manor Motorsport	25	+25.811	30
21	37	(Thailand) Tor Graves	Manor Motorsport	25	+32.307	33
22	22	(Portugal) Álvaro Parente	Team Ghinzani Euroc S.A.M.	25	+32.678	28
23	38	(United Kingdom) Danny Watts	Hitech Racing	25	+32.973	14
24	48	(Venezuela) Ernesto Viso	Fortec Motorsport	25	+36.244	34
25	40	(United Kingdom) Andrew Thompson	Hitech Racing	25	+36.989	37
26	24	(Austria) Andreas Zuber	Team Rosberg	25	+38.805	22
27	14	(Canada) Bruno Spengler	ASM	25	+39.077	24
28	46	(Germany) Marcel Lasée	Swiss Racing Team	25	+41.594	36
29	6	(Japan) Katsuyuki Hiranaka	Prema Powerteam	25	+41.866	32
30	41	(Germany) Timo Glock	Opel Team KMS	25	+43.515	31
31	26	(Netherlands) Charles Zwolsman Jr.	Kolles	22	+3 Laps	26
32	10	(United States) Richard Antinucci	Carlin Motorsport	14	+11 Laps	10
33	4	(Poland) Robert Kubica	Prema Powerteam	13	+12 Laps	20
Ret	51	(Greece) Alexandros Margaritis	MB Racing Performance	6	Retired	21
Ret	28	(Austria) Bernhard Auinger	Superfund TME	6	Retired	35
Ret	39	(France) Eric Salignon	Hitech Racing	5	Retired	11
Ret	43	(Canada) Billy Asaro	Menu F3 Motorsport	5	Retired	19
DNS	25	(Finland) Nico Rosberg	Team Rosberg	0		
DNQ	30	(Italy) Stefano Gattuso	Team Corbetta/Ombra			
DNQ	45	(Portugal) César Campaniço	Swiss Racing Team			
DNQ	29	(Japan) Sakon Yamamoto	Superfund TME			
DNQ	16	(Italy) Omar Galeffi	Target Racing			
DNQ	18	(Belgium) Gregory Franchi	Lucidi Motors			
DNQ	17	(Italy) Fausto Ippoliti	Target Racing			
DNQ	21	(Austria) Philipp Baron	Team Ghinzani Euroc S.A.M.			
DNQ	31	(Italy) Davide Mazzoleni	Team Corbetta/Ombra			
DNQ	53	(Italy) Giacomo Piccini	Imola Racing			
Fastest lap: Ryan Briscoe, 1:34.220, 164.564 km/h (102.255 mph) on lap 7

== See also ==
- 2003 Formula 3 Euro Series season
- 2003 British Formula 3 season
