= Auinger =

Auinger is a surname. Notable people with the surname include:

- August Auinger (born 1955), Austrian motorcycle road racer
- Bernhard Auinger (born 1982), Austrian race car driver
