= 2007 Deutsche Tourenwagen Masters =

Motorsports season

Champions
- Drivers' Champion: Mattias Ekström
- Teams' Champion: Abt Sportsline

Seasons
- ← 2006 2008 →

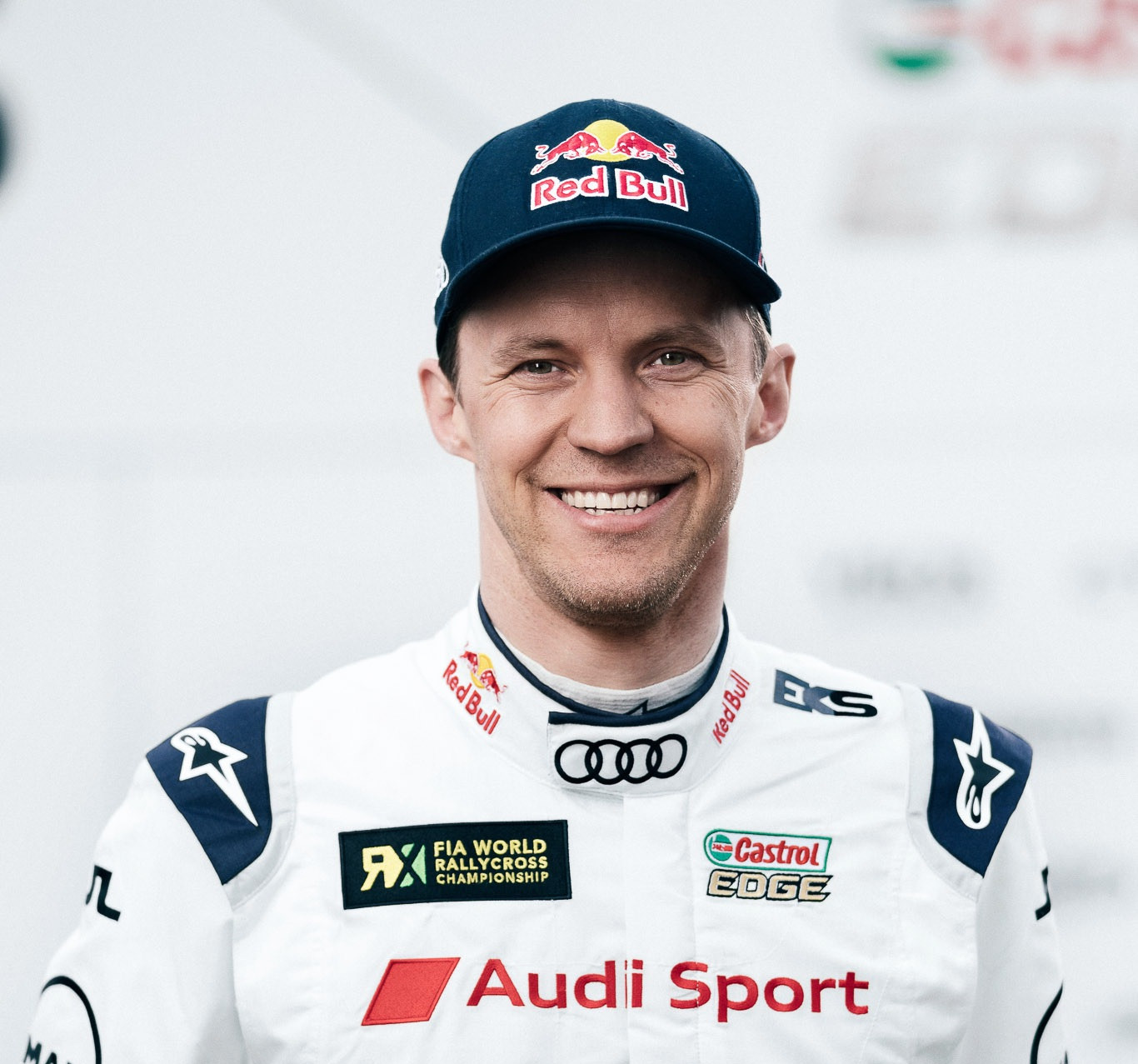
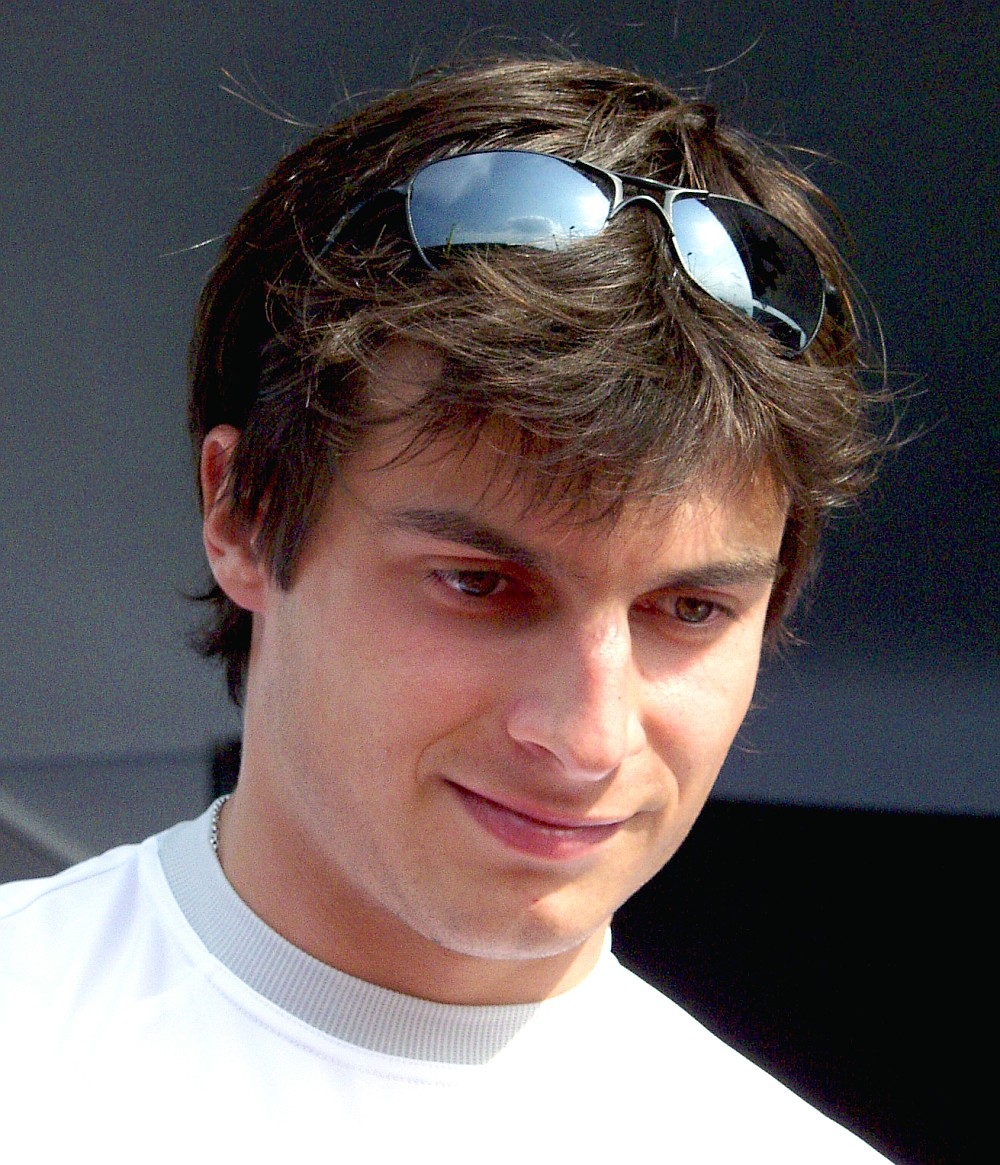
Mattias Ekström (left) won his second Deutsche Tourenwagen Masters Drivers' Championship while Bruno Spengler (right) finished second in the championship.

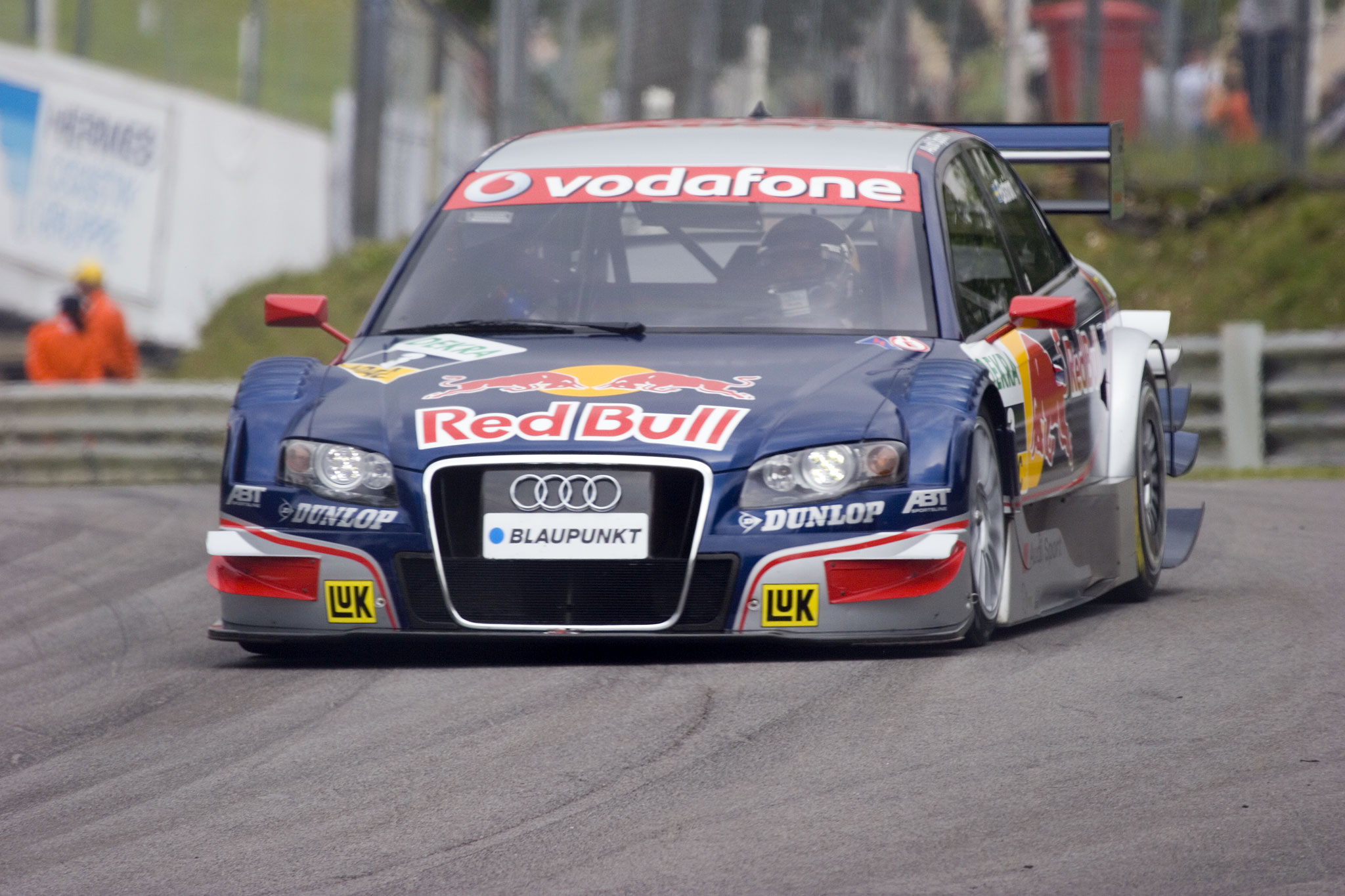
The Drivers' Championship was won by Mattias Ekström.

The 2007 Deutsche Tourenwagen Masters was the twenty-first season of premier German touring car championship and also eighth season under the moniker of Deutsche Tourenwagen Masters since the series' resumption in 2000.

== Season summary ==
The season started dramatically with massive crash on opening lap of Hockenheim race. As a result, Tom Kristensen and Alexandre Prémat were forced to sit out races.

The season also included many controversial moments. In Lausitzring, the safety car caught the wrong driver and this shook up race results almost completely. Organizers admitted that Mika Häkkinen deserved the win and Paul di Resta second place, but other drivers were not in the places where they should have been. As a result, half points were awarded and thus race director Roland Bruynseraede was sacked on 31 May 2007.

At Zandvoort, Audi drivers swapped positions on the start/finish straight on the final lap, handing the race win to Martin Tomczyk instead of Prémat. Audi Motorsport Director Wolfgang Ullrich denied the presence of team orders and instead said that Prémat did the move on his own.

At the Circuit de Catalunya near Barcelona before 42,000 spectators, Häkkinen collided with Martin Tomczyk and Daniel la Rosa with Mattias Ekström. This and couple of other incidents caused that all Audi drivers withdrew from the race on the instruction of Audi Motorsport Director Wolfgang Ullrich with nine laps to go. Häkkinen and la Rosa were excluded from the race (which was meaningless as both drivers retired in the incidents), fined and given 10-place grid penalty for final race of the season.

This was the final season that Vodafone was a front windscreen sponsor as well as Blaupunkt as a front vehicle plate sponsor.

== Teams and drivers ==
The following manufacturers, teams and drivers competed in the 2007 Deutsche Tourenwagen Masters. All teams competed with tyres supplied by Dunlop.

Manufacturer	Car	Team	No.	Drivers	Rounds
Mercedes-Benz	AMG-Mercedes C-Klasse 2007	HWA Team	1	(Germany) Bernd Schneider	All
Mercedes-Benz	AMG-Mercedes C-Klasse 2007	HWA Team	2	(Canada) Bruno Spengler	All
Mercedes-Benz	AMG-Mercedes C-Klasse 2007	HWA Team	5	(United Kingdom) Jamie Green	All
Mercedes-Benz	AMG-Mercedes C-Klasse 2007	HWA Team	6	(Finland) Mika Häkkinen	All
Mercedes-Benz	AMG-Mercedes C-Klasse 2006	Persson Motorsport	9	(United Kingdom) Gary Paffett	All
Mercedes-Benz	AMG-Mercedes C-Klasse 2006	Persson Motorsport	10	(Greece) Alexandros Margaritis	All
Mercedes-Benz	AMG-Mercedes C-Klasse 2005	Persson Motorsport	19	(United Kingdom) Paul di Resta	All
Mercedes-Benz	AMG-Mercedes C-Klasse 2006	Mücke Motorsport	14	(United Kingdom) Susie Stoddart	All
Mercedes-Benz	AMG-Mercedes C-Klasse 2006	Mücke Motorsport	15	(Germany) Daniel la Rosa	All
Mercedes-Benz	AMG-Mercedes C-Klasse 2005	Mücke Motorsport	18	(Austria) Mathias Lauda	All
Audi	Audi A4 DTM 2007	Abt Sportsline	3	(Sweden) Mattias Ekström	All
Audi	Audi A4 DTM 2007	Abt Sportsline	4	(Germany) Martin Tomczyk	All
Audi	Audi A4 DTM 2007	Abt Sportsline	7	(Denmark) Tom Kristensen	1, 5-10
Audi	Audi A4 DTM 2007	Abt Sportsline	7	(Germany) Frank Biela	2
Audi	Audi A4 DTM 2007	Abt Sportsline	7	(Germany) Markus Winkelhock	3-4
Audi	Audi A4 DTM 2007	Abt Sportsline	8	(Germany) Timo Scheider	All
Audi	Audi A4 DTM 2006	Team Rosberg	11	(Germany) Mike Rockenfeller	All
Audi	Audi A4 DTM 2006	Team Rosberg	12	(Germany) Lucas Luhr	All
Audi	Audi A4 DTM 2006	Team Phoenix	16	(Germany) Christian Abt	All
Audi	Audi A4 DTM 2006	Team Phoenix	17	(France) Alexandre Prémat	1, 3-10
Audi	Audi A4 DTM 2006	Team Phoenix	17	(Germany) Marco Werner	2
Audi	Audi A4 DTM 2005	Futurecom TME	20	(United Kingdom) Adam Carroll	1-5
Audi	Audi A4 DTM 2005	Futurecom TME	20	(Germany) Markus Winkelhock	6-10
Audi	Audi A4 DTM 2005	Futurecom TME	21	(Belgium) Vanina Ickx	All

=== Driver changes ===
Jean Alesi left the DTM after five seasons in the championship, citing frustration with driving a year old car in 2006.

2006 Formula 3 Euro Series champion Paul di Resta joined the series with Persson Motorsport.

Stefan Mücke left the series after five seasons. He was replaced at Mücke Motorsport by Mathias Lauda who had driven for Perrsson Motorsport the previous season.

2005 DTM champion Gary Paffett returned to the series with Perrsson Motorsport after spending the previous year focussing on his role as test driver at the McLaren F1 Team.

Heinz-Harald Frentzen left the series after claiming that he had no support from Audi. He was replaced by Timo Scheider who had driven for Team Rosberg the previous season.

Mike Rockenfeller and Lucas Luhr joined the series with Team Rosberg after both switching from being Porsche factory drivers to Audi factory drivers.

GP2 frontrunner Alexandre Prémat joined the series with Team Phoenix.

GP2 driver Adam Carroll joined the series with Futurecom TME.

Pierre Kaffer and Frank Stippler both left the series.

=== Mid season changes ===
Tom Kristensen had to miss three rounds due to injuries sustained at the season opener in Hockenheim. He was replaced by Frank Biela at Oschersleben and Markus Winkelhock at EuroSpeedway and Brands Hatch.

Alexandre Prémat had to miss the Oschersleben round due to injuries sustained at the season opener in Hockenheim. He was replaced by Marco Werner.

Adam Carroll left Futurecom TME after the fifth round after failing to fulfill sponsorship obligations and returned to the GP2 Series. He was replaced by Markus Winkelhock for the remainder of the season.

== Race calendar and winners ==
Round	Circuit	Date	Local Time	Pole position	Fastest Lap	Winning driver	Winning team	Winning manufacturer	TV
	(Germany) Präsentation Düsseldorf	15 April	10:00						
1	(Germany) Hockenheimring	22 April	14:00	(Canada) Bruno Spengler	(Sweden) Mattias Ekström	(Sweden) Mattias Ekström	Audi Sport Team Abt Sportsline	Audi	ARD
2	(Germany) Oschersleben	6 May	14:00	(Finland) Mika Häkkinen	(United Kingdom) Jamie Green	(United Kingdom) Gary Paffett	Laureus AMG Mercedes	Mercedes	ARD
3	(Germany) EuroSpeedway	20 May	14:00	(Canada) Bruno Spengler	(Sweden) Mattias Ekström	(Finland) Mika Häkkinen	AMG Mercedes	Mercedes	ARD
4	(United Kingdom) Brands Hatch	10 June	13:00	(Finland) Mika Häkkinen	(Germany) Martin Tomczyk	(Germany) Bernd Schneider	Original-Teile AMG Mercedes	Mercedes	ARD
5	(Germany) Norisring	24 June	14:00	(Canada) Bruno Spengler	(Canada) Bruno Spengler	(Canada) Bruno Spengler	DaimlerChrysler Bank AMG Mercedes	Mercedes	ARD
6	(Italy) Mugello	15 July	17:45	(Sweden) Mattias Ekström	(Germany) Martin Tomczyk	(Finland) Mika Häkkinen	AMG Mercedes	Mercedes	ARD
7	(Netherlands) Zandvoort	29 July	13:00	(Germany) Timo Scheider	(United Kingdom) Jamie Green	(Germany) Martin Tomczyk	Audi Sport Team Abt Sportsline	Audi	ARD
8	(Germany) Nürburgring	2 September	15:00	(Germany) Martin Tomczyk	(Canada) Bruno Spengler	(Germany) Martin Tomczyk	Audi Sport Team Abt Sportsline	Audi	ARD
9	(Spain) Barcelona	23 September	14:00	(Germany) Martin Tomczyk	(Canada) Bruno Spengler	(United Kingdom) Jamie Green	Salzgitter AMG Mercedes	Mercedes	ARD
10	(Germany) Hockenheimring	14 October	14:00	(Denmark) Tom Kristensen	(United Kingdom) Jamie Green	(United Kingdom) Jamie Green	Salzgitter AMG Mercedes	Mercedes	ARD

== Championship standings ==
=== Scoring system ===
Points are awarded to the top 8 classified finishers.

Position	**1st**	**2nd**	**3rd**	**4th**	**5th**	**6th**	**7th**	**8th**
Points	10	8	6	5	4	3	2	1

=== Drivers' championship ===
Pos	Driver	HOC (Germany)	OSC (Germany)	LAU• (Germany)	BRH (United Kingdom)	NOR (Germany)	MUG (Italy)	ZAN (Netherlands)	NÜR (Germany)	CAT (Spain)	HOC (Germany)	Pts
1	(Sweden) Mattias Ekström	1	7	10	3	3	**2**	3	3	Ret	3	50
2	(Canada) Bruno Spengler	**14**	Ret	**3**	5	**1**	4	5	2	2	4	47
3	(Germany) Martin Tomczyk	2	5	9	2	Ret	Ret	1	**1**	**Ret**	9	40
4	(United Kingdom) Jamie Green	6	11	6	6	6	Ret	11	5	1	1	34.5
5	(United Kingdom) Paul di Resta	5	2	2	Ret	15	3	14	6	3	8	32
6	(Germany) Bernd Schneider	7	6	4	1	2	11	12	7	Ret	5	31.5
7	(Germany) Timo Scheider	9	4	5	13	14	Ret	**4**	4	Ret	2	25
8	(Finland) Mika Häkkinen	10	**17**	1	**4**	9	1	7	10	DSQ	17	22
9	(United Kingdom) Gary Paffett	8	1	8	10	4	Ret	9	12	5	Ret	20.5
10	(Greece) Alexandros Margaritis	4	8	Ret	9	7	Ret	8	13	4	7	16
11	(France) Alexandre Prémat	Ret		Ret	7	8	7	2	9	10†	16	13
12	(Germany) Mike Rockenfeller	12	3	13	Ret	13	6	10	17	7†	DSQ	11
13	(Germany) Daniel la Rosa	3	14	16†	DSQ	12	5	DNS	14	DSQ	10	10
14	(Denmark) Tom Kristensen	Ret				5	8	18†	8	9†	**6**	9
15	(Austria) Mathias Lauda	13	13	7	12	11	12†	15	11	6	11	4
16	(Germany) Christian Abt	Ret	10	17†	8	10	Ret	6	15	11†	15	4
17	(Germany) Lucas Luhr	11	12	14	11	18†	Ret	16	16	8†	12	1
18	(United Kingdom) Adam Carroll	Ret	9	11	15	17†						0
19	(Germany) Markus Winkelhock			Ret	14		9	13	Ret	12†	13	0
20	(United Kingdom) Susie Stoddart	Ret	16	12	16	16	10	17	18	Ret	14	0
21	(Belgium) Vanina Ickx	15	Ret	15	17	Ret	Ret	DNS	19	13†	18	0
22	(Germany) Marco Werner		15									0
23	(Germany) Frank Biela		18†									0
Pos	Driver	HOC (Germany)	OSC (Germany)	LAU• (Germany)	BRH (United Kingdom)	NOR (Germany)	MUG (Italy)	ZAN (Netherlands)	NÜR (Germany)	CAT (Spain)	HOC (Germany)	Pts

Colour	Result
Gold	Winner
Silver	Second place
Bronze	Third place
Green	Points classification
Blue	Non-points classification
Blue	Non-classified finish (NC)
Purple	Retired, not classified (Ret)
Red	Did not qualify (DNQ)
Red	Did not pre-qualify (DNPQ)
Black	Disqualified (DSQ)
White	Did not start (DNS)
White	Withdrew (WD)
White	Race cancelled (C)
Blank	Did not practice (DNP)
Blank	Did not arrive (DNA)
Blank	Excluded (EX)

**Bold** – Pole
Italics – Fastest Lap

- † — Driver retired, but was classified as they completed 90% of the winner's race distance.

• Half points were awarded at EuroSpeedway because of mistakes by race director during the safety car period. (Points were awarded 5-4-3-2.5-2-1.5-1-0.5).

=== Teams' championship ===
Pos.	Team	No.	HOC (Germany)	OSC (Germany)	LAU• (Germany)	BRH (United Kingdom)	NOR (Germany)	MUG (Italy)	ZAN (Netherlands)	NÜR (Germany)	CAT (Spain)	HOC (Germany)	Points
1	Audi Sport Team Abt Sportsline	3	1	7	10	3	3	**2**	3	3	Ret	3	90
1	Audi Sport Team Abt Sportsline	4	2	5	9	2	Ret	Ret	1	**1**	**Ret**	9	90
2	Original-Teile / DaimlerChrysler Bank AMG Mercedes	1	7	6	4	1	2	11	12	7	Ret	5	78.5
2	Original-Teile / DaimlerChrysler Bank AMG Mercedes	2	**14**	Ret	**3**	5	**1**	4	5	2	2	4	78.5
3	Salzgitter / AMG Mercedes	5	6	11	6	6	6	Ret	11	5	1	1	56.5
3	Salzgitter / AMG Mercedes	6	10	**17**	1	**4**	9	1	7	10	DSQ	17	56.5
4	stern / Laureus AMG Mercedes	9	8	1	8	10	4	Ret	9	12	5	Ret	36.5
4	stern / Laureus AMG Mercedes	10	4	8	Ret	9	7	Ret	8	13	4	7	36.5
5	Audi Sport Team Abt	7	Ret	18†	Ret	14	5	8	18†	8	9†	**6**	34
5	Audi Sport Team Abt	8	9	4	5	13	14	Ret	**4**	4	Ret	2	34
6	TV Spielfilm / JAWA4U.de AMG Mercedes	14	Ret	16	12	16	16	10	17	18	Ret	14	32
6	TV Spielfilm / JAWA4U.de AMG Mercedes	19	5	2	2	Ret	15	3	14	6	3	8	32
7	Audi Sport Team Phoenix	16	Ret	10	17†	8	10	Ret	6	15	11†	15	17
7	Audi Sport Team Phoenix	17	Ret	15	Ret	7	8	7	2	9	10†	16	17
8	TrekStor / Trilux AMG Mercedes	15	3	14	16†	DSQ	12	5	DNS	14	DSQ	10	14
8	TrekStor / Trilux AMG Mercedes	18	13	13	7	12	11	12†	15	11	6	11	14
9	Audi Sport Team Rosberg	11	12	3	13	Ret	13	6	10	17	7†	DSQ	12
9	Audi Sport Team Rosberg	12	11	12	14	11	18†	Ret	16	16	8†	12	12
10	Futurecom TME	20	Ret	9	11	15	17†	9	13	Ret	12†	13	0
10	Futurecom TME	21	15	Ret	15	17	Ret	Ret	DNS	19	13†	18	0
Pos.	Team	No.	HOC (Germany)	OSC (Germany)	LAU• (Germany)	BRH (United Kingdom)	NOR (Germany)	MUG (Italy)	ZAN (Netherlands)	NÜR (Germany)	CAT (Spain)	HOC (Germany)	Points

== Bibliography ==
- Voigt, Thomas (November 2007). DTM Jahrbuch 2007: Das offizielle Buch der DTM (in German). Königswinter: Heel Verlag. ISBN 978-3-89880-824-8.
- Schröder, Torben (November 2007). Tourenwagen Story 2007 (in German). Saint Vith: Adrenalin Verlag. ISBN 978-3-940672-03-2.
