= 2006 Deutsche Tourenwagen Masters =

German motorsport season

Champions
- Drivers' Champion: Bernd Schneider
- Teams' Champion: HWA Team I

Seasons
- ← 2005 2007 →

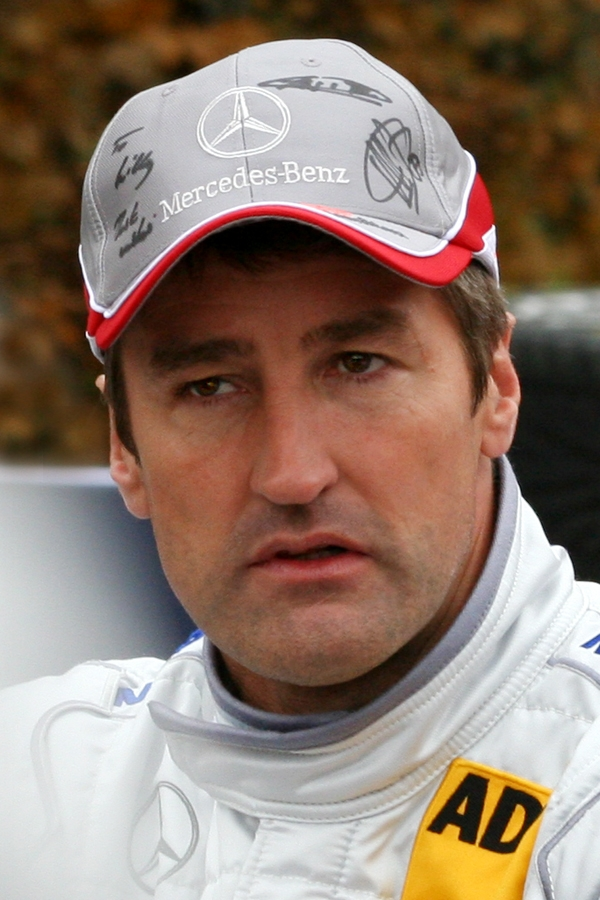
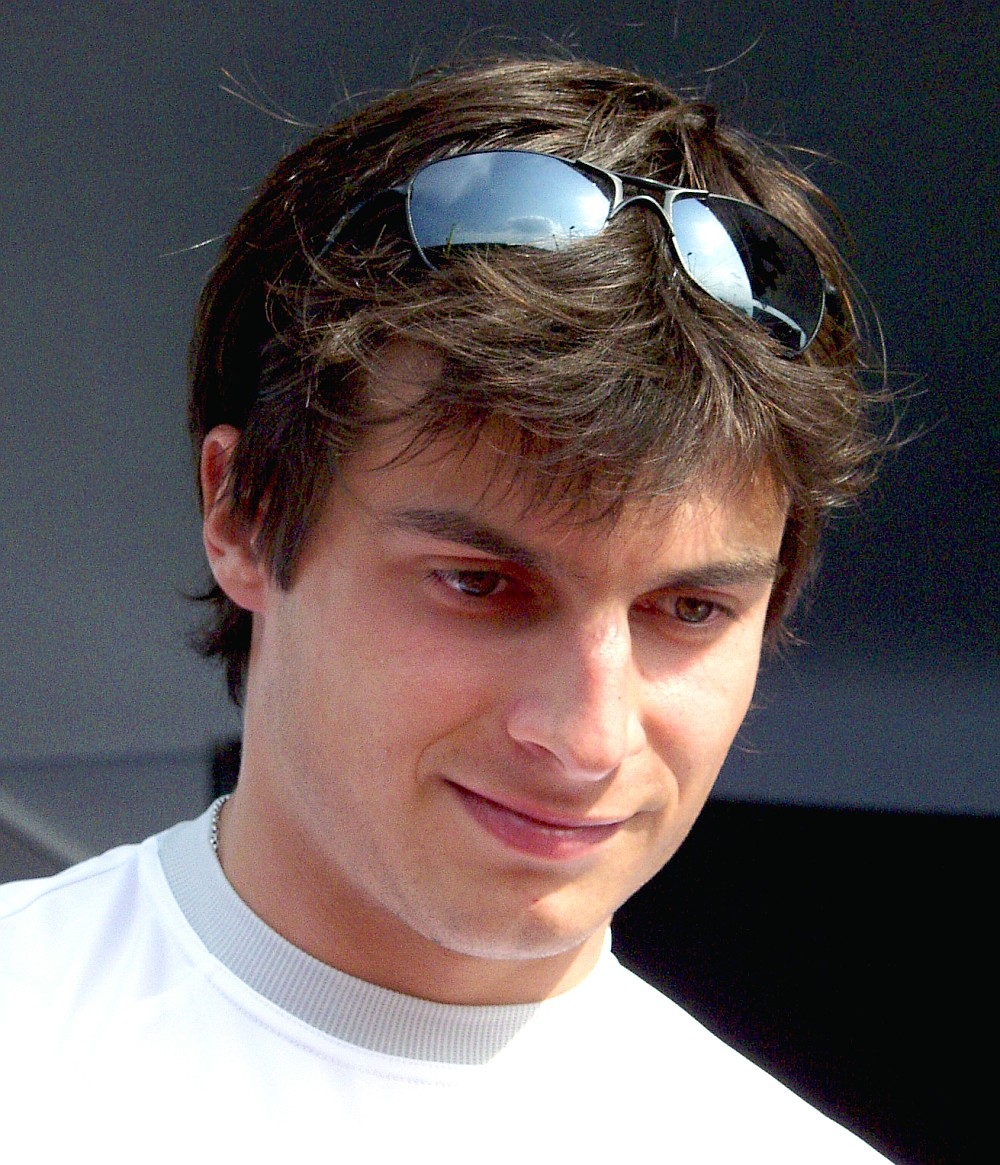
Bernd Schneider (left) won his fourth Deutsche Tourenwagen Masters Drivers' Championship while Bruno Spengler (right) finished second in the championship.

The 2006 Deutsche Tourenwagen Masters was the twentieth season of premier German touring car championship and also seventh season under the moniker of Deutsche Tourenwagen Masters since the series was resumed in 2000. The number of race weekends was reduced, from eleven in 2005, to ten for the 2006 season. Each track hosted one race, with the exception of Hockenheim, which hosted two. As in 2005, each event consisted of one race of approximately one hour, with two compulsory pit stops for each car. The Championship was won by Bernd Schneider driving an AMG-Mercedes C-Klasse 2006 for the HWA Team. Team Rosberg returned to the series after one-year absence and thus switched to Audi Sport machinery.

== Changes for 2006 ==
- Opel exited the series, leaving Audi and Mercedes as remaining manufacturers. Audi and Mercedes respectively increased their number of entries from eight to ten cars each to fill up the four empty spots left by Opel.
- Older 2004 models became cheaper, allowing privateer teams to buy them.
- The rounds in Belgium at Spa-Francorchamps and Turkey at Istanbul Park were dropped in favour of Le Mans in France and Barcelona in Spain.
- The round in Czech Republic at Brno were removed from the schedule.

== Teams and drivers ==
The following manufacturers, teams and drivers competed in the 2006 Deutsche Tourenwagen Masters. All teams competed with tyres supplied by Dunlop.

Manufacturer	Car	Team	No.	Drivers	Rounds
Mercedes-Benz	AMG-Mercedes C-Klasse 2006	HWA Team	2	(Germany) Bernd Schneider	All
Mercedes-Benz	AMG-Mercedes C-Klasse 2006	HWA Team	3	(United Kingdom) Jamie Green	All
Mercedes-Benz	AMG-Mercedes C-Klasse 2006	HWA Team	8	(Finland) Mika Häkkinen	All
Mercedes-Benz	AMG-Mercedes C-Klasse 2006	HWA Team	9	(Canada) Bruno Spengler	All
Mercedes-Benz	AMG-Mercedes C-Klasse 2005	Persson Motorsport	10	(France) Jean Alesi	All
Mercedes-Benz	AMG-Mercedes C-Klasse 2005	Persson Motorsport	11	(Greece) Alexandros Margaritis	All
Mercedes-Benz	AMG-Mercedes C-Klasse 2004	Persson Motorsport	21	(Austria) Mathias Lauda	All
Mercedes-Benz	AMG-Mercedes C-Klasse 2005	Mücke Motorsport	17	(Germany) Stefan Mücke	All
Mercedes-Benz	AMG-Mercedes C-Klasse 2005	Mücke Motorsport	18	(Germany) Daniel la Rosa	All
Mercedes-Benz	AMG-Mercedes C-Klasse 2004	Mücke Motorsport	22	(United Kingdom) Susie Stoddart	All
Audi	Audi A4 DTM 2006	Audi Sport Team Abt Sportsline	4	(Germany) Martin Tomczyk	All
Audi	Audi A4 DTM 2006	Audi Sport Team Abt Sportsline	5	(Sweden) Mattias Ekström	All
Audi	Audi A4 DTM 2006	Audi Sport Team Abt Sportsline	6	(Germany) Heinz-Harald Frentzen	All
Audi	Audi A4 DTM 2006	Audi Sport Team Abt Sportsline	7	(Denmark) Tom Kristensen	All
Audi	Audi A4 DTM 2005	Audi Sport Team Phoenix	12	(Germany) Christian Abt	All
Audi	Audi A4 DTM 2005	Audi Sport Team Phoenix	14	(Germany) Pierre Kaffer	All
Audi	Audi A4 DTM 2005	Audi Sport Team Rosberg	15	(Germany) Frank Stippler	All
Audi	Audi A4 DTM 2005	Audi Sport Team Rosberg	16	(Germany) Timo Scheider	All
Audi	Audi A4 DTM 2004	Futurecom TME	19	(Netherlands) Olivier Tielemans	1–3*
Audi	Audi A4 DTM 2004	Futurecom TME	19	(Netherlands) Jeroen Bleekemolen	4–5**
Audi	Audi A4 DTM 2004	Futurecom TME	19	(Denmark) Nicolas Kiesa	6–8***
Audi	Audi A4 DTM 2004	Futurecom TME	19	(Sweden) Thed Björk	9–10
Audi	Audi A4 DTM 2004	Futurecom TME	20	(Belgium) Vanina Ickx	All

=== Team changes ===
Opel left the series after the 2005 season due to budget cuts at General Motors in Europe. Team Holzer would also leave after being part of Opel's squad since 2000.

Team Joest left the series so they could concentrate on the development of the Audi R10 diesel sports car. They were replaced by Team Phoenix, who had run Opel's the previous season, and Team Rosberg who returned to the series after a one year absence. Both teams would run one year old cars.

F1 team boss Colin Kolles would enter the championship with two two year old Audi A4s run under the Futurecom TME banner.

Mercedes teams Mücke Motorsport and Persson Motorsport expanded to three cars each with each running two one year old cars and one two year old cars each.

=== Driver changes ===
Reigning champion Gary Paffett left the DTM to focus on his F1 test driver role at McLaren Mercedes with hopes of a race seat in 2007.

Bruno Spengler and Jamie Green were promoted from Persson Motorsport to HWA Team while Jean Alesi was demoted from HWA Team to Persson Motorsport.

Heinz-Harald Frentzen switched from Opel to Audi to replace Allan McNish who left the series to focus on Endurance racing.

Laurent Aïello and Manuel Reuter retired from motorsport after Opel left the series.

Marcel Fässler left the DTM to join Swiss Spirit in the Le Mans Series.

Rinaldo Capello left the DTM to focus on Endurance racing.

Alexandros Margaritis moved from Mücke Motorsport to Persson Motorsport.

GP2 driver Mathias Lauda joined the DTM with Persson Motorsport.

Daniel la Rosa and Susie Stoddart joined the DTM with Mücke Motorsport after spending the previous year in Formula Renault 3.5 Series and British Formula 3 respectively.

Vanina Ickx and Olivier Tielemans joined the DTM with Futurecom TME after spending the previous year in BELCAR and 3000 Pro Series respectively.

=== Mid season changes ===
Olivier Tielemans was replaced by Jeroen Bleekemolen after the second round of the season.

Jeroen Bleekemolen was replaced by Nicolas Kiesa after sponsorship troubles after the fifth round.

Nicolas Kiesa was replaced by Thed Björk for the final two races after Kiesa was injured in a motocross accident.

== Race calendar and winners ==
Round	Circuit	Date	Pole position	Fastest Lap	Winning driver	Winning team	Winning manufacturer	TV
	(Germany) Präsentation Düsseldorf	26 March						
1	(Germany) Hockenheimring	9 April	(United Kingdom) Jamie Green	(Canada) Bruno Spengler	(Germany) Bernd Schneider	Vodafone AMG Mercedes	Mercedes	ARD
2	(Germany) EuroSpeedway	30 April	(United Kingdom) Jamie Green	(Canada) Bruno Spengler	(Germany) Bernd Schneider	Vodafone AMG Mercedes	Mercedes	ARD
3	(Germany) Oschersleben	21 May	(Denmark) Tom Kristensen	(Denmark) Tom Kristensen	(Denmark) Tom Kristensen	Audi Sport Team Abt	Audi	ARD
4	(United Kingdom) Brands Hatch	2 July	(Denmark) Tom Kristensen	(Germany) Bernd Schneider	(Sweden) Mattias Ekström	Audi Sport Team Abt Sportsline	Audi	ARD
5	(Germany) Norisring	23 July	(United Kingdom) Jamie Green	(Canada) Bruno Spengler	(Canada) Bruno Spengler	DaimlerChrysler Bank AMG Mercedes	Mercedes	ARD
6	(Germany) Nürburgring	20 August	(Canada) Bruno Spengler	(Canada) Bruno Spengler	(Canada) Bruno Spengler	DaimlerChrysler Bank AMG Mercedes	Mercedes	ARD
7	(Netherlands) Zandvoort	3 September	(United Kingdom) Jamie Green	(Finland) Mika Häkkinen	(Denmark) Tom Kristensen	Audi Sport Team Abt	Audi	ARD
8	(Spain) Barcelona	24 September	(Germany) Martin Tomczyk	(Germany) Bernd Schneider	(Germany) Martin Tomczyk	Audi Sport Team Abt Sportsline	Audi	ARD
9	(France) Le Mans	15 October	(Canada) Bruno Spengler	(Finland) Mika Häkkinen	(Canada) Bruno Spengler	DaimlerChrysler Bank AMG Mercedes	Mercedes	ARD
10	(Germany) Hockenheimring	29 October	(Germany) Heinz-Harald Frentzen	(United Kingdom) Jamie Green	(Canada) Bruno Spengler	DaimlerChrysler Bank AMG Mercedes	Mercedes	ARD

== Championship standings ==
=== Scoring system ===
Points are awarded to the top 8 classified finishers.

Position	**1st**	**2nd**	**3rd**	**4th**	**5th**	**6th**	**7th**	**8th**
Points	10	8	6	5	4	3	2	1

=== Drivers' championship ===
Pos	Driver	HOC (Germany)	LAU (Germany)	OSC (Germany)	BRH (United Kingdom)	NOR (Germany)	NÜR (Germany)	ZAN (Netherlands)	CAT (Spain)	BUG (France)	HOC (Germany)	Pts
1	(Germany) Bernd Schneider	1	1	5	3	2	2	2	2	5	4	71
2	(Canada) Bruno Spengler	9	5	2	7	1	**1**	4	5	**1**	1	63
3	(Denmark) Tom Kristensen	2	2	**1**	**18**†	5	5	1	9	3	3	56
4	(Germany) Martin Tomczyk	7	8	6	4	16†	3	3	**1**	4	5	42
5	(United Kingdom) Jamie Green	**Ret**	**4**	3	2	**Ret**	9	**8**	Ret	6	2	31
6	(Finland) Mika Häkkinen	4	3	9	11	3	12	11	11	2	Ret	25
7	(Germany) Heinz-Harald Frentzen	3	13	4	17†	11	6	5	3	10	**14**†	24
8	(Sweden) Mattias Ekström	Ret	DSQ	7	1	6	8	13	4	Ret	12†	21
9	(France) Jean Alesi	6	7	8	6	Ret	4	Ret	14	11	8	15
10	(Germany) Timo Scheider	8	9	14	10	7	7	6	Ret	8	6	12
11	(Greece) Alexandros Margaritis	5	6	20†	8	Ret	15	Ret	8	7	13†	11
12	(Germany) Stefan Mücke	Ret	12	12	13	4	11	7	12	15	Ret	7
13	(Germany) Christian Abt	Ret	Ret	17	5	10	10	Ret	10	9	7	6
14	(Germany) Frank Stippler	12	11	13	Ret	9	Ret	14	6	Ret	Ret	3
15	(Germany) Daniel la Rosa	14	Ret	11	12	15†	16	10	7	Ret	Ret	2
16	(Germany) Pierre Kaffer	Ret	10	10	9	8	14	9	Ret	12	NC	1
17	(United Kingdom) Susie Stoddart	10	15	15	16	14†	Ret	12	15	13	9	0
18	(Austria) Mathias Lauda	11	14	16	15	Ret	13	15	13	Ret	10	0
19	(Belgium) Vanina Ickx	15	16	18	Ret	13	18	Ret	Ret	16	11	0
20	(Netherlands) Jeroen Bleekemolen				14	12						0
21	(Netherlands) Olivier Tielemans	13	17	19								0
22	(Sweden) Thed Björk									14	15†	0
23	(Denmark) Nicolas Kiesa						17	16	Ret			0
Pos	Driver	HOC (Germany)	LAU (Germany)	OSC (Germany)	BRH (United Kingdom)	NOR (Germany)	NÜR (Germany)	ZAN (Netherlands)	CAT (Spain)	BUG (France)	HOC (Germany)	Pts

Colour	Result
Gold	Winner
Silver	Second place
Bronze	Third place
Green	Points classification
Blue	Non-points classification
Blue	Non-classified finish (NC)
Purple	Retired, not classified (Ret)
Red	Did not qualify (DNQ)
Red	Did not pre-qualify (DNPQ)
Black	Disqualified (DSQ)
White	Did not start (DNS)
White	Withdrew (WD)
White	Race cancelled (C)
Blank	Did not practice (DNP)
Blank	Did not arrive (DNA)
Blank	Excluded (EX)

**Bold** – Pole
Italics – Fastest Lap

- † — Driver retired, but was classified as they completed 90% of the winner's race distance.

=== Teams' championship ===
Pos.	Team	No.	HOC (Germany)	LAU (Germany)	OSC (Germany)	BRH (United Kingdom)	NOR (Germany)	NÜR (Germany)	ZAN (Netherlands)	CAT (Spain)	BUG (France)	HOC (Germany)	Points
1	Vodafone / Salzgitter AMG Mercedes	2	1	1	5	3	2	2	2	2	5	4	102
1	Vodafone / Salzgitter AMG Mercedes	3	**Ret**	**4**	3	2	**Ret**	9	**8**	Ret	6	2	102
2	DaimlerChrysler Bank AMG Mercedes	8	4	3	9	11	3	12	11	11	2	Ret	88
2	DaimlerChrysler Bank AMG Mercedes	9	9	5	2	7	1	**1**	4	5	**1**	1	88
3	Audi Sport Team Abt	6	3	13	4	17†	11	6	5	3	10	**14**†	80
3	Audi Sport Team Abt	7	2	2	**1**	**18**†	5	5	1	9	3	3	80
4	Audi Sport Team Abt Sportsline	4	7	8	6	4	16†	3	3	**1**	4	5	63
4	Audi Sport Team Abt Sportsline	5	Ret	DSQ	7	1	6	8	13	4	Ret	12†	63
5	stern / Easy Rent AMG Mercedes	10	6	7	8	6	Ret	4	Ret	14	11	8	26
5	stern / Easy Rent AMG Mercedes	11	5	6	20†	8	Ret	15	Ret	8	7	13†	26
6	Audi Sport Team Rosberg	15	8	9	14	10	7	7	6	Ret	8	6	15
6	Audi Sport Team Rosberg	16	12	11	13	Ret	9	Ret	14	6	Ret	Ret	15
7	TV-Spielfilm / TrekStor AMG Mercedes	17	Ret	12	12	13	4	11	7	12	15	Ret	9
7	TV-Spielfilm / TrekStor AMG Mercedes	18	14	Ret	11	12	15†	16	10	7	Ret	Ret	9
8	Audi Sport Team Phoenix	12	Ret	Ret	17	5	10	10	Ret	10	9	7	7
8	Audi Sport Team Phoenix	14	Ret	10	10	9	8	14	9	Ret	12	NC	7
9	AutoScout24 / Junge Gebrauchte AMG Mercedes	21	11	14	16	15	Ret	13	15	13	Ret	10	0
9	AutoScout24 / Junge Gebrauchte AMG Mercedes	22	10	15	15	16	14†	Ret	12	15	13	9	0
10	Futurecom TME	19	13	17	19	14	12	17	16	Ret	14	15†	0
10	Futurecom TME	20	15	16	18	Ret	13	18	Ret	Ret	16	11	0
Pos.	Team	No.	HOC (Germany)	LAU (Germany)	OSC (Germany)	BRH (United Kingdom)	NOR (Germany)	NÜR (Germany)	ZAN (Netherlands)	CAT (Spain)	BUG (France)	HOC (Germany)	Points

== Bibliography ==
- Voigt, Thomas (2006). DTM Jahrbuch 2006: Das offizielle Buch der DTM (in German). Königswinter: Heel Verlag. ISBN 978-3-89880-691-6.
- Bock, Friedemann (November 2006). Tourenwagen Story 2006 (in German). Saint Vith: Adrenalin Verlag. ISBN 978-3-940672-00-1.
