= Bruno Spengler =

Canadian racing driver (born 1983)

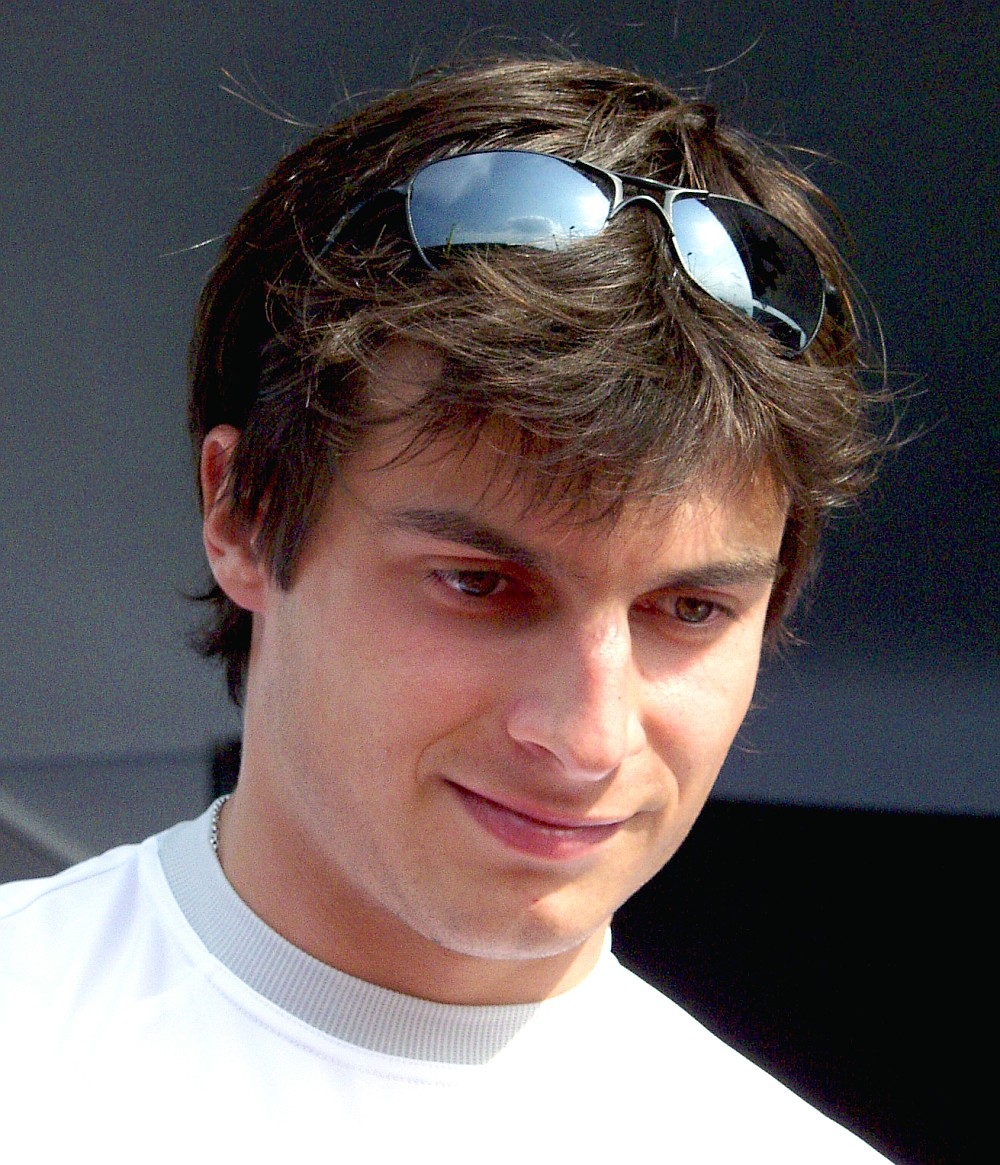
- At the Nürburgring in 2006, as a DTM driver.
- Nationality: (Canada) Canadian (France) French
- Born: August 23, 1983 (age 43) Schiltigheim, France

DTM career
- Debut season: 2005
- Current team: BMW Team RMG
- Categorisation: FIA Platinum
- Car number: 7
- Former teams: Persson Motorsport; HWA Team; Schnitzer Motorsport; Team MTEK; Team RBM
- Starts: 195
- Championships: 1 (2012)
- Wins: 16
- Podiums: 51
- Poles: 18
- Fastest laps: 15
- Finished last season: 9th (106 pts)

Previous series
- 2003–04 2001–02: Formula 3 Euro Series; Eurocup Formula Renault 2.0

Championship titles
- 2023 2012: Italian GT Championship Sprint Cup; DTM

Bruno Spengler (born August 23, 1983) is an Alsatian-born Canadian racing driver. A long-term Mercedes-AMG and BMW factory driver, he currently works for Bugatti. He was the 2012 DTM champion.

== Career ==
=== Early career ===
Spengler was born near Strasbourg, France but moved with his parents to Saint-Hippolyte, Quebec, Canada, when he was three. He went to school in Canada but continued to go back to France where he started competing in kart racing in 1995. Spengler continued karting in both France and Canada and then moved on to competing in the French Formula Renault. Eventually this led to him being signed by Mercedes-Benz motorsport and in 2003 he was racing for ASM in the Formula Three Euroseries.

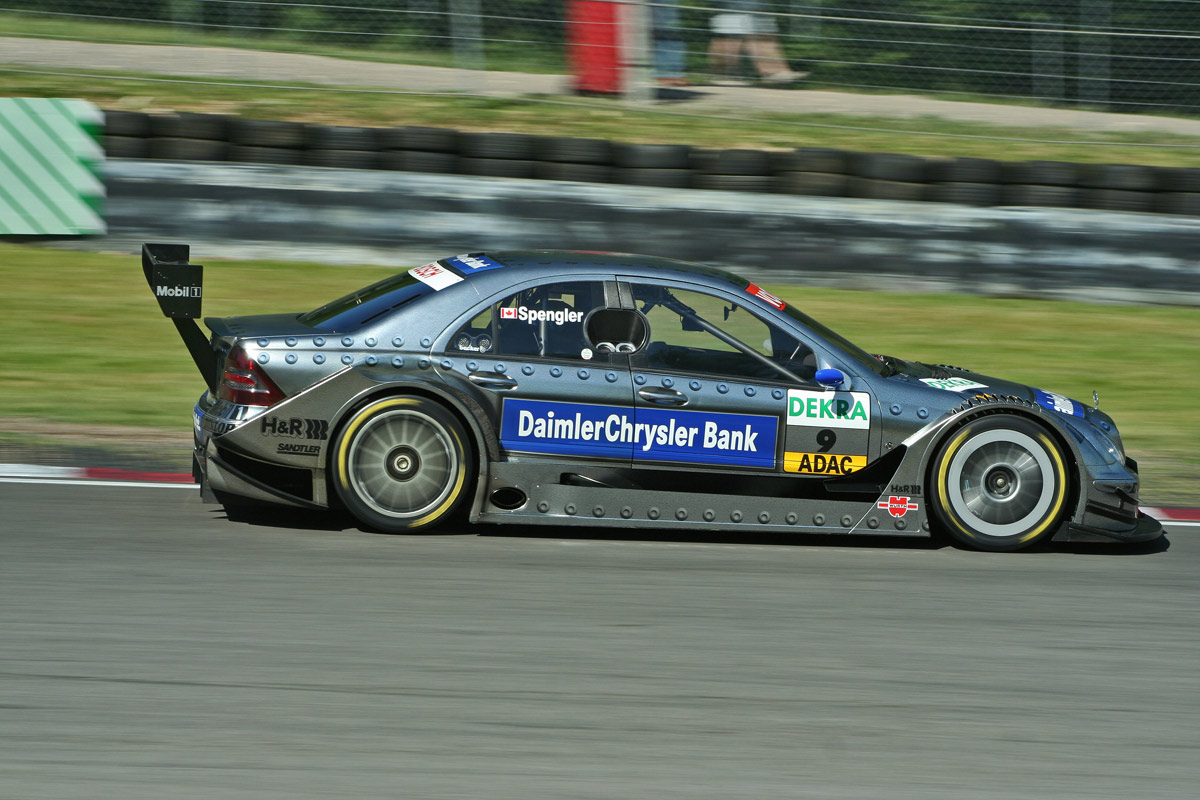
Spengler driving for Mercedes-Benz in the 2006 Deutsche Tourenwagen Masters season.

=== DTM ===
From 2005 until the end of 2011, Spengler drove a Mercedes in the Deutsche Tourenwagen Masters in Germany. In 2005 he ran with Persson Motorsport and he convinced AMG directors to have an official car in 2006. That year he finished the 2006 season second behind his teammate and five times champion Bernd Schneider. He completed the 2007 season campaign once again in second place, this time behind Audi driver Mattias Ekström, despite Audi's mass pull-out in Barcelona.

In August 2007, Spengler was mentioned in a possible move to the new Prodrive F1 team for 2008, and possibly for a drive with McLaren. Spengler was a leading candidate for an F1 driver's seat based on his performances and also it was thought to help drive up interest in North America for Formula 1. With Prodrive gone and Heikki Kovalainen signed for McLaren, this did not happen for 2008. While leading the DTM in points during the 2010 season, Spengler's name was again brought up as a possible candidate to drive in F1. Norbert Haug Mercedes motorsports director commented that if Spengler were to win the DTM championship he would earn a ride in F1. However, he lost the championship in the last few races to Paul di Resta who went on to drive for Force India in the next F1 season.

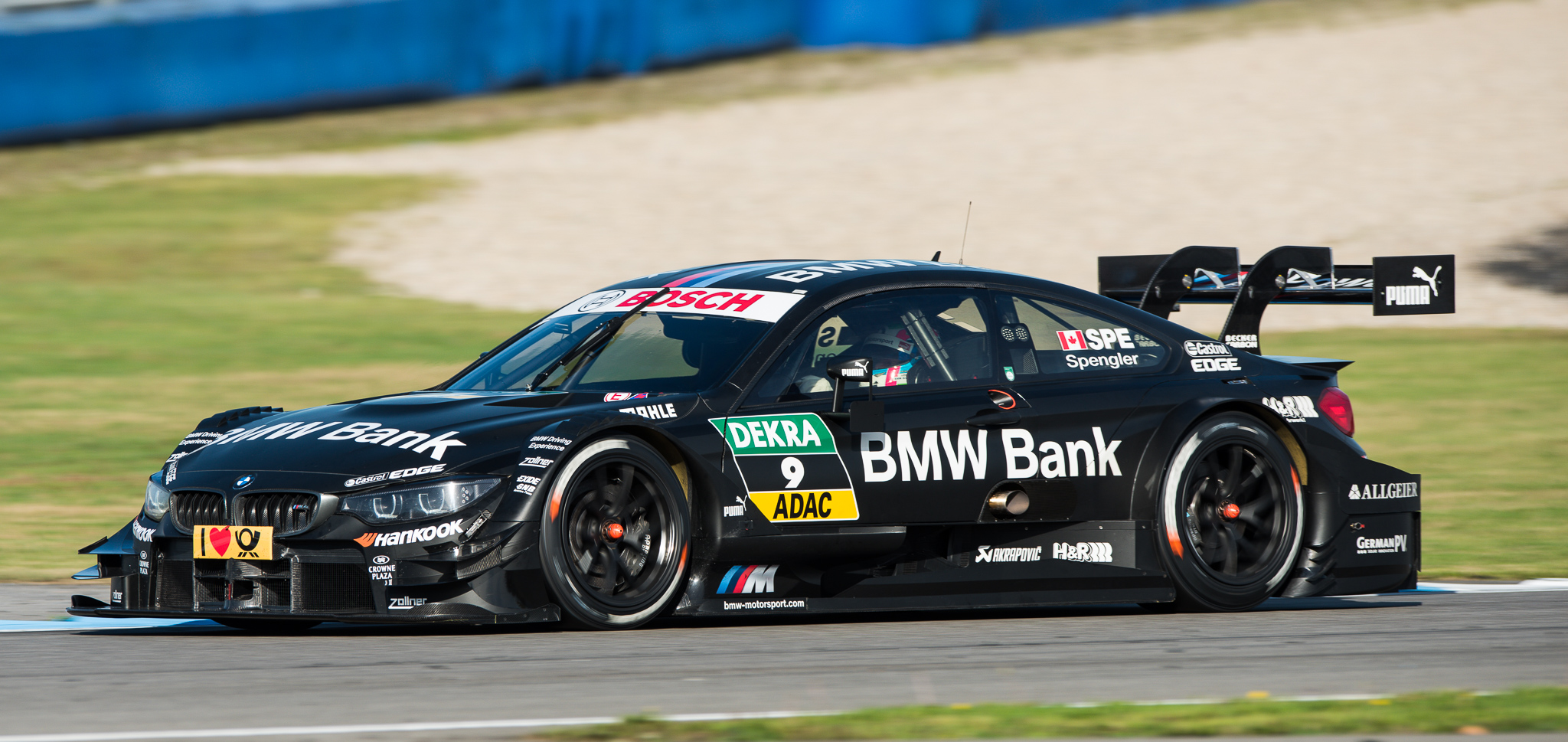
Spengler competing in the 2014 DTM season.

For the 2012 season, Spengler left Mercedes and joined BMW Team Schnitzer for the latter's return to DTM. Spengler had a strong season, coming into the last race at the Hockenheimring three points behind leader and Mercedes driver Gary Paffett. He overtook Paffett at the start and held on to win the race. With this victory, his fourth of the season, Spengler took the Driver's Championship by four points and helped Team Schnitzer to the Teams' Championship and BMW to the Manufacturers' Championship.

=== Formula E ===
Spengler became, alongside Beitske Visser, one of the test and reserve drivers for Andretti Autosport ahead of the 2018–19 Formula E season.

=== Sportscar racing ===
Spengler left the DTM after the 2019 season and switched focus to endurance racing. He debuted in the 24 Hours of Le Mans in 2020 for ByKolles Racing, won once for BMW Team RLL in the IMSA SportsCar Championship's GTLM class, and was crowned Italian GT Sprint champion in 2023. After two years in the Japanese Super GT Championship, he parted ways with BMW at the end of 2024.

In 2025, Spengler joined Alsatian sports car manufacturer Bugatti in the role of "Pilote Officiel", taking over from Pierre-Henri Raphanel.

== Racing record ==
=== Complete Formula 3 Euro Series results ===
(key) (Races in bold indicate pole position) (Races in italics indicate fastest lap)

Year	Entrant	Chassis	Engine	1	2	3	4	5	6	7	8	9	10	11	12	13	14	15	16	17	18	19	20	DC	Points
2003	ASM F3	Dallara F303/016	Mercedes	HOC; 1	HOC; 2	ADR; 1	ADR; 2	PAU; 1	PAU; 2	NOR; 1; 19†	NOR; 2 Ret	LMS; 1; 11	LMS; 2; 3	NÜR; 1; 16	NÜR; 2; 4	A1R; 1; 3	A1R; 2; 7	ZAN; 1; 2	ZAN; 2 Ret	HOC; 3; 6	HOC; 4; 5	MAG; 1 Ret	MAG; 2; 21	10th	34
2004	ASL-Mücke Motorsport/ ADAC Berlin-Brandenburg	Dallara F302/012	Mercedes	HOC; 1; 7	HOC; 2 Ret	EST; 1; 10	EST; 2; 10	ADR; 1; 7	ADR; 1; 20	PAU; 1; 6	PAU; 2 Ret	NOR; 1; 8	NOR; 1; 6	MAG; 1; 5	MAG; 2; 3	NÜR; 1; 9	NÜR; 2; 7	ZAN; 1; 13	ZAN; 2; 11	BRN; 1; 11	BRN; 2; 5	HOC; 1; 21†	HOC; 2; 9	11th	27

^{†} Driver did not finish the race, but was classified as he completed over 90% of the race distance.

=== Complete Deutsche Tourenwagen Masters results ===
(key) (Races in bold indicate pole position) (Races in italics indicate fastest lap)

Year	Team	Car	1	2	3	4	5	6	7	8	9	10	11	12	13	14	15	16	17	18	19	20	Pos.	Points
2005	Persson Motorsport	AMG-Mercedes C-Klasse 2004	HOC; 12	LAU; 15†	SPA; Ret	BRN; 11	OSC; 16	NOR; 13†	NÜR; 15	ZAN; 9	LAU; 6	IST; 8	HOC; 8										16th	5
2006	HWA Team	AMG-Mercedes C-Klasse 2006	HOC; 9	LAU; 5	OSC; 2	BRH; 7	NOR; 1	**NÜR**; 1	ZAN; 4	CAT; 5	**BUG**; 1	HOC; 1											2nd	63
2007	HWA Team	AMG-Mercedes C-Klasse 2007	**HOC**; 14	OSC; Ret	**LAU**; 3	BRH; 5	**NOR**; 1	MUG; 4	ZAN; 5	NÜR; 2	CAT; 2	HOC; 4											2nd	47
2008	HWA Team	AMG-Mercedes C-Klasse 2008	HOC; 4	OSC; 3	MUG; 9	LAU; 6	**NOR**; 2	ZAN; 5	NÜR; 7	BRH; 6	CAT; Ret	BUG; 7	HOC; 4										5th	38
2009	HWA Team	AMG-Mercedes C-Klasse 2009	HOC; Ret	LAU; 2	NOR; 2	ZAN; 5	OSC; 6	NÜR; 6	BRH; 6	CAT; 5	**DIJ**; 3	HOC; 7											4th	41
2010	HWA Team	AMG-Mercedes C-Klasse 2009	HOC; 2	VAL; 2	LAU; 1	NOR; 3	NÜR; 1	ZAN; 7	BRH; 2	OSC; 2	HOC; Ret	ADR; 3	SHA; 13										3rd	66
2011	HWA Team	AMG-Mercedes C-Klasse 2009	**HOC**; 1	**ZAN**; 2	SPL; 4	**LAU**; 3	**NOR**; 1	NÜR; 2	BRH; 7	OSC; 13†	VAL; 7	HOC; 9											3rd	51
2012	BMW Team Schnitzer	BMW M3 DTM	HOC; Ret	**LAU**; 1	BRH; 2	SPL; Ret	NOR; 3	**NÜR**; 1	ZAN; 6	**OSC**; 1	VAL; 6	HOC; 1											1st	149
2013	BMW Team Schnitzer	BMW M3 DTM	HOC; 5	BRH; 2	**SPL**; 1	LAU; 7	NOR; 6	MSC; 19	NÜR; 14	OSC; 21†	ZAN; 20	**HOC**; 3											3rd	82
2014	BMW Team Schnitzer	BMW M4 DTM	HOC; 6	OSC; 12	HUN; 3	NOR; 11	MSC; 2	SPL; 10	NÜR; 12	LAU; 15	ZAN; 16	HOC; 12											11th	42
2015	BMW Team MTEK	BMW M4 DTM	HOC; 1; 11	HOC; 2; 9	LAU; 1; 11	LAU; 2; 19	NOR; 1; 5	**NOR**; **2**; 3	ZAN; 1; 5	ZAN; 2; 3	SPL; 1; 15	SPL; 2; 15	MSC; 1; 3	MSC; 2; 2	OSC; 1; 2	OSC; 2; 10	NÜR; 1; 19†	NÜR; 2; 3	HOC; 1; 19†	HOC; 2; 8			5th	123
2016	BMW Team MTEK	BMW M4 DTM	HOC; 1; 6	HOC; 2 Ret	SPL; 1; 13	SPL; 2; 9	LAU; 1; 11	LAU; 2; 9	NOR; 1; 5	NOR; 2; 7	ZAN; 1; 13	ZAN; 2; 14	MSC; 1; 15	MSC; 2; 3	NÜR; 1; 18	NÜR; 2; 6	HUN; 1; 14	HUN; 2; 12	HOC; 1; 14	HOC; 2; 12			15th	51
2017	BMW Team RBM	BMW M4 DTM	HOC; 1; 12	HOC; 2; 9	LAU; 1; 14	LAU; 2; 16	HUN; 1; 3	HUN; 2; 14	NOR; 1; 1	NOR; 2; 12	MSC; 1; 12	**MSC**; **2**; 3	ZAN; 1; 14	ZAN; 2; 10	NÜR; 1; 13	NÜR; 2; 4	SPL; 1; 12	SPL; 2; 16	HOC; 1; 10	HOC; 2; 14			13th	75
2018	BMW Team RBM	BMW M4 DTM	HOC; 1; 6	HOC; 2; 8	LAU; 1; 5	LAU; 2; 15	HUN; 1; 12	HUN; 2 DSQ	NOR; 1; 6	NOR; 2; 4	ZAN; 1; 12	ZAN; 2; 13	BRH; 1; 17	BRH; 2; 14	MIS; 1 Ret	MIS; 2; 11	NÜR; 1; 2	NÜR; 2; 4	SPL; 1 Ret	SPL; 2; 15	HOC; 1; 9	HOC; 2; 6	12th	85
2019	BMW Team RMG	BMW M4 Turbo DTM	HOC; 1; 7	HOC; 2; 5	ZOL; 1; 10	ZOL; 2; 7	MIS; 1; 4	MIS; 2; 8	NOR; 1; 5	NOR; 2; 1	ASS; 1; 15	ASS; 2 Ret	BRH; 1; 12	BRH; 2 Ret	LAU; 1; 9	LAU; 2; 14	NÜR; 1; 2	NÜR; 2; 10	HOC; 1; 8	HOC; 2; 9			9th	106

^{†} Driver did not finish, but completed 75% of the race distance.

=== Complete IMSA SportsCar Championship results ===
(key) (Races in bold indicate pole position; races in italics indicate fastest lap)

Year	Entrant	Class	Make	Engine	1	2	3	4	5	6	7	8	9	10	11	Rank	Points
2015	BMW Team RLL	GTLM	BMW Z4 GTE	BMW 4.4 L V8	DAY; 2	SEB	LBH	LGA	WGL	MOS	LIM	ELK	VIR	COA	PET	21st	33
2016	BMW Team RLL	GTLM	BMW M6 GTLM	BMW 4.4 L Turbo V8	DAY; 5	SEB; 2	LBH	LGA	WGL	MOS	LIM	ELK	VIR	COA	PET	18th	60
2017	BMW Team RLL	GTLM	BMW M6 GTLM	BMW 4.4 L Turbo V8	DAY; 8	SEB	LBH	COA	WGL	MOS	LIM	ELK	VIR	LGA	PET	26th	23
2020	BMW Team RLL	GTLM	BMW M8 GTE	BMW S63 4.0 L Turbo V8	DAY; 5	DAY; 4	SEB; 4	ELK; 6	VIR; 2	ATL; 1	MDO; 3	CLT; 3	PET; 6	LGA; 5	SEB; 4	4th	313
2021	BMW Team RLL	GTLM	BMW M8 GTE	BMW S63 4.0 L Turbo V8	DAY; 5	SEB; 2	DET	WGL; 3	WGL	LIM	ELK	LGA	LBH	VIR	PET; 5	7th	1251
2023	Turner Motorsport	GTD Pro	BMW M4 GT3	BMW P58 3.0 L Turbo I6	DAY; 9	SEB	LBH	LGA	WGL	MOS	LIM	ELK	VIR	IMS	PET	27th	245

=== Complete ADAC GT Masters results ===
(key) (Races in bold indicate pole position; races in italics indicate fastest lap)

Year	Team	Car	1	2	3	4	5	6	7	8	9	10	11	12	13	14	15	16	DC	Points
2015	BMW Sports Trophy Team Schubert	BMW Z4 GT3	OSC; 1	OSC; 2	RBR; 1	RBR; 2	SPA; 1	SPA; 2	LAU; 1	LAU; 2	NÜR; 1	NÜR; 2	SAC; 1	SAC; 2	ZAN; 1	ZAN; 2	HOC; 1; 4	HOC; 2; 3	25th	30
2023	FK Performance Motorsport	BMW M4 GT3	HOC; 1	HOC; 2	NOR; 1	NOR; 2	NÜR; 1	NÜR; 2	SAC; 1	SAC; 2	RBR; 1; 1	RBR; 2; 10	HOC; 1	HOC; 2					20th	31

=== Complete FIA World Endurance Championship results ===
(key) (Races in bold indicate pole position; races in italics indicate fastest lap)

Year	Entrant	Class	Chassis	Engine	1	2	3	4	5	6	7	8	Rank	Points
2018–19	BMW Team MTEK	LMGTE Pro	BMW M8 GTE	BMW S63 4.0 L Turbo V8	SPA	LMS	SIL	FUJ	SHA	SEB; 7	SPA	LMS	28th	8
2019–20	ByKolles Racing Team	LMP1	ENSO CLM P1/01	Gibson GL458 4.5 L V8	SIL	FUJ	SHA	BHR	COA	SPA; 11	LMS; Ret	BHR	NC†	0†

^{†} As Spengler was a guest driver he was ineligible to score points.

=== Complete 24 Hours of Le Mans results ===
Year	Team	Co-Drivers	Car	Class	Laps	Pos.	Class Pos.
2020	(Austria) ByKolles Racing Team	(United Kingdom) Oliver Webb (France) Tom Dillmann	ENSO CLM P1/01-Gibson	LMP1	97	DNF	DNF

=== Complete Super GT results ===
(key) (Races in bold indicate pole position; races in italics indicate fastest lap)

Year	Team	Car	Class	1	2	3	4	5	6	7	8	DC	Points
2023	BMW Team Studie x CRS	BMW M4 GT3	GT300	OKA; 6	FUJ	SUZ	FUJ	SUZ; 16	SUG; 13	AUT; 8	MOT; 12	21st	8
2024	BMW M Team Studie x CRS	BMW M4 GT3	GT300	OKA	FUJ; 11	SUZ; 7	FUJ; 7	SUG	AUT; 4	MOT	SUZ; 13	15th	16

Sporting positions
Preceded by Martin Tomczyk	Deutsche Tourenwagen Masters; Champion; 2012	Succeeded by Mike Rockenfeller
