= 2003 Formula 3 Euro Series =

The 2003 Formula 3 Euro Series season was the first championship year of Europe's premier Formula Three series. The championship consisted of ten rounds – each with two races – held at a variety of European circuits. Each weekend consisted of 1 hour and 30 minutes of free practice on Friday – in either one or two sessions – and two 30-minute qualifying sessions. This was followed by a c.110 km race on Saturday and a c.80 km race on Sunday. Each qualifying session awarded one bonus point for pole position and each race awarded points for the top eight finishers, with ten points per win. It commenced on April 26, 2003 at Hockenheimring and ended on October 26 at Circuit de Nevers Magny-Cours.

== Teams and drivers ==
2003 Entry List
Team	#	Driver	Rookie	Chassis (Note: All drivers competed in Dallara chassis; model listed.)	Engine	Rounds
(Germany) Team Rosberg	3	(Germany) Nico Rosberg (Note: Rosberg is a German driver who raced under Finnish license.)	R	F303/005	Opel	All
(Germany) Team Rosberg	4	(Austria) Andreas Zuber		F303/006	Opel	All
(France) ASM F3	5	(France) Alexandre Prémat	R	F303/015	Mercedes	All
(France) ASM F3	6	(France) Olivier Pla		F303/014	Mercedes	All
(France) ASM F3	34	(Canada) Bruno Spengler	R	F303/016	Mercedes	4–10
(France) ASM F3	39	(United Kingdom) Jamie Green		F303/016	Mercedes	3
(Italy) Prema Powerteam	7	(Japan) Katsuyuki Hiranaka		F303/007	Opel	All
(Italy) Prema Powerteam	8	(Australia) Ryan Briscoe		F303/008	Opel	All
(Italy) Prema Powerteam	33	(Brazil) Lucas di Grassi	R	F303/022	Opel	2–3
(Italy) Prema Powerteam	33	(Poland) Robert Kubica	R	F303/022	Opel	4–10
(France) Signature Plus	9	(France) Nicolas Lapierre		F302/043	Sodemo	All
(France) Signature Plus	10	(Brazil) Fabio Carbone		F302/018	Sodemo	All
(France) Signature Plus	42	(Portugal) César Campaniço		F302/067	Sodemo	10
(Switzerland) Opel Team KMS	11	(Germany) Timo Glock		F303/009	Opel	All
(Switzerland) Opel Team KMS	12	(Germany) Maro Engel	R	F302/009	Opel	1–5
(Switzerland) Opel Team KMS	12	(Germany) Hendrik Vieth	R	F302/009	Opel	6
(Switzerland) Opel Team KMS	12	(United Kingdom) Adam Carroll		F302/009	Opel	7–10
(France) Saulnier Racing	14	(Switzerland) Harold Primat		F302/021	Sodemo	All
(France) Saulnier Racing	15	(France) Simon Abadie		F302/060	Sodemo	1–5
(France) Saulnier Racing	15	(Portugal) Nicolas Armindo (Note: Armindo is a French driver who raced this year under Portuguese racing license.)	R	F302/060	Sodemo	9–10
(Italy) Team Ghinzani	16	(Netherlands) Robert Doornbos		F302/052	Mugen	All
(Italy) Team Ghinzani	17	(Portugal) Álvaro Parente		F302/003	Mugen	All
(Italy) Team Ghinzani	38	(Austria) Philipp Baron	R	F302/042	Mugen	3–10
(France) LD Autosport	18	(Italy) Stefano Proetto		F302/065	Mugen	1–6
(France) LD Autosport	18	(France) Patrice Manopoulos	R	F302/065	Mugen	7–10
(France) LD Autosport	19	(France) Simon Abadie		F302/063	Mugen	6–10
(Switzerland) Swiss Racing Team	20	(Switzerland) Gilles Tinguely		F302/061	Opel	1–5
(Switzerland) Swiss Racing Team	21	(Portugal) César Campaniço		F302/011	Opel	1–7
(Switzerland) Swiss Racing Team	35	(Australia) James Manderson		F302/062	Opel	1–4
(Switzerland) Swiss Racing Team	35	(Italy) Stefano Proetto		F302/062	Opel	9–10
(Switzerland) Swiss Racing Team	41	(Germany) Marcel Lasée		F302/062	Opel	5–7, 9
(Germany) Mücke Motorsport	22	(Germany) Markus Winkelhock		F302/012	Mercedes	All
(Germany) Mücke Motorsport	23	(Austria) Christian Klien	R	F302/032	Mercedes	All
(Germany) Kolles	24	(Netherlands) Charles Zwolsman Jr.		F303/012	Mercedes	All
(Germany) Kolles	25	(Belgium) Jan Heylen	R	F302/076	Mercedes	1–7
(Germany) Kolles	25	(United Kingdom) Jamie Green		F302/076	Mercedes	8–10
(Germany) MB Racing Performance	28	(Greece) Alexandros Margaritis	R	F303/021	Opel	All
(Germany) MB Racing Performance	36	(Germany) Daniel la Rosa	R	F302/083	Opel	All
(Luxembourg) Superfund TME	29	(Japan) Sakon Yamamoto		F303/001	Toyota	All
(Luxembourg) Superfund TME	30	(Austria) Bernhard Auinger		F302/088	Toyota	All
(Austria) HBR Motorsport	31	(Austria) Richard Lietz		F302/030	Opel	All
(Austria) HBR Motorsport	32	(Italy) Claudio Torre	R	F302/033	Opel	5–9
(Italy) Drumel Motorsport	37	(South Korea) Dong-Wook Lee	R	F303/004	Mugen	1–2
(Italy) Drumel Motorsport	38	(Austria) Philipp Baron	R	F303/003	Mugen	1–2

Icon	Legend
R	Rookie

=== Driver changes ===
Entering Formula 3 Euro Series

- Simon Abadie: French Formula Three Championship (Saulnier Racing) → Saulnier Racing
- Nicolas Armindo: Championnat de France Formula Renault 2.0 & Eurocup Formula Renault 2.0 (ASM Elf) → Saulnier Racing
- Bernhard Auinger: German Formula Three Championship (Opel Team BSR) → Superfund TME
- Philipp Baron: Debut → Drumel Motorsport
- Ryan Briscoe: German Formula Three Championship (Prema Powerteam) & International Formula 3000 (Coca-Cola Nordic Racing) → Prema Powerteam
- César Campaniço: German Formula Three Championship (Prema Powerteam) → Swiss Racing Team
- Fabio Carbone: British Formula 3 Championship (Fortec Motorsport) → Signature Plus
- Adam Carroll: British Formula 3 National Class (Sweeney Racing) → Opel Team KMS
- Robert Doornbos: German Formula Three Championship (Team Ghinzani) → Team Ghinzani
- Maro Engel: Formula BMW ADAC (Eifelland Racing) → Opel Team KMS
- Timo Glock: German Formula Three Championship (Opel Team KMS) → Opel Team KMS
- Lucas di Grassi: Formula Renault 2.0 Brazil (G Force Motorsport) → Prema Powerteam
- Jamie Green: Formula Renault 2.0 UK (Fortec Motorsport) → ASM
- Jan Heylen: British Formula Ford Championship (Duckhams) → Kolles
- Katsuyuki Hiranaka: All-Japan Formula Three Championship (TOM'S) → Prema Powerteam
- Christian Klien: Formula Renault 2.0 Germany & Eurocup Formula Renault 2.0 (JD Motorsport) → Mücke Motorsport
- Robert Kubica: Formula Renault 2.0 Italy & Eurocup Formula Renault 2.0 (RC Motorsport) → Prema Powerteam
- Nicolas Lapierre: Eurocup Formula Renault 2.0 (Graff Racing) & French Formula Three Championship (Signature) → Signature Plus
- Marcel Lasée: German Formula Three Championship (Mücke Motorsport) → Swiss Racing Team
- Dong-Wook Lee: Asian Formula Three Championship (E-Rain) → Drumel Motorsport
- Richard Lietz: German Formula Three Championship (Palfinger F3 Racing) → HBR Motorsport
- James Manderson: Australian Formula 3 (Bronte Rundle Motorsport) → Swiss Racing Team
- Patrice Manopoulos: Debut → LD Autosport
- Alexandros Margaritis: Formula Renault 2.0 Germany & Formula BMW ADAC (Weigl Motorsport) → MB Racing Performance
- Álvaro Parente: Spanish Formula Three Championship (Racing Engineering) → Team Ghinzani
- Olivier Pla: French Formula Three Championship (ASM) → ASM
- Alexandre Prémat: Championnat de France Formula Renault 2.0 & Eurocup Formula Renault 2.0 (ASM Elf) → ASM
- Harold Primat: British Formula 3 National Class (Diamond Racing) → Saulnier Racing
- Stefano Proetto: German Formula Three Championship (Team Kolles Racing & Swiss Racing Team) → LD Autosport
- Daniel la Rosa: Formula Volkswagen Germany (???) → MB Racing Performance
- Nico Rosberg: Formula BMW ADAC (VIVA Racing) → Team Rosberg
- Bruno Spengler: Formula Renault 2.0 Germany & Eurocup Formula Renault 2.0 (Jenzer Motorsport) → ASM
- Gilles Tinguely: German Formula Three Championship (Swiss Racing Team) → Swiss Racing Team
- Claudio Torre: Formula BMW ADAC (Springbok Motorsport) → HBR Motorsport
- Hendrik Vieth: Formula Renault 2.0 Germany & Eurocup Formula Renault 2.0 (SL Formula Racing) → Opel Team KMS
- Markus Winkelhock: German Formula Three Championship (Mücke Motorsport) → Mücke Motorsport
- Sakon Yamamoto: German Formula Three Championship (GM Motorsport, Team Kolles Racing) → Superfund TME
- Andreas Zuber: Formula Renault 2.0 Germany (Motopark Oschersleben) → Team Rosberg
- Charles Zwolsman Jr.: German Formula Three Championship (Team Kolles Racing) → Kolles

==== Midseason changes ====
- César Campaniço joined Signature Plus for the Magny-Cours round
- Simon Abadie joined LD Autosport from the Nürburgring round onwards.
- Philipp Baron joined Team Ghinzani from the Pau round onwards.
- Stefano Proetto joined Swiss Racing Team from the second Hockenheimring round onwards.

== Calendar ==
- The series supported the Deutsche Tourenwagen Masters at seven rounds. It was also a part of the Grand Prix Aurore at two French meetings, while at the third, it was the headline event of the Pau Grand Prix.

Round		Circuit	Country	Date
1	R1	Hockenheimring	Germany	26 April
1	R2	Hockenheimring	Germany	27 April
2	R1	Adria International Raceway	Italy	10 May
2	R2	Adria International Raceway	Italy	11 May
3	R1	Pau Circuit	France	8 June
3	R2	Pau Circuit	France	9 June
4	R1	Norisring, Nuremberg	Germany	21 June
4	R2	Norisring, Nuremberg	Germany	22 June
5	R1	Bugatti Circuit, Le Mans	France	12 July
5	R2	Bugatti Circuit, Le Mans	France	13 July
6	R1	Nürburgring	Germany	16 August
6	R2	Nürburgring	Germany	17 August
7	R1	A1-Ring, Spielberg	Austria	6 September
7	R2	A1-Ring, Spielberg	Austria	7 September
8	R1	Circuit Park Zandvoort	Netherlands	20 September
8	R2	Circuit Park Zandvoort	Netherlands	21 September
9	R1	Hockenheimring	Germany	4 October
9	R2	Hockenheimring	Germany	5 October
10	R1	Circuit de Nevers Magny-Cours	France	25 October
10	R2	Circuit de Nevers Magny-Cours	France	26 October

== Results ==
Round		Circuit	Pole position	Fastest lap	Winning driver	Winning team	Winning rookie
1	R1	(Germany) Hockenheimring	(France) Olivier Pla	(Germany) Markus Winkelhock	(Australia) Ryan Briscoe	(Italy) Prema Powerteam	(Austria) Christian Klien
1	R2	(Germany) Hockenheimring	(France) Olivier Pla	(Germany) Timo Glock	(Australia) Ryan Briscoe	(Italy) Prema Powerteam	(Finland) Nico Rosberg
2	R1	(Italy) Adria International Raceway	(Austria) Christian Klien	(Australia) Ryan Briscoe	(Germany) Timo Glock	(Switzerland) Opel Team KMS	(Austria) Christian Klien
2	R2	(Italy) Adria International Raceway	(Finland) Nico Rosberg	(Australia) Ryan Briscoe	(Australia) Ryan Briscoe	(Italy) Prema Powerteam	(Finland) Nico Rosberg
3	R1	(France) Pau Circuit	(France) Nicolas Lapierre	(Japan) Katsuyuki Hiranaka	(Australia) Ryan Briscoe	(Italy) Prema Powerteam	(Greece) Alexandros Margaritis
3	R2	(France) Pau Circuit	(Australia) Ryan Briscoe	(France) Alexandre Prémat	(Brazil) Fabio Carbone	(France) Signature Plus	(Brazil) Lucas di Grassi
4	R1	(Germany) Norisring, Nuremberg	(France) Alexandre Prémat	(France) Alexandre Prémat	(Poland) Robert Kubica	(Italy) Prema Powerteam	(Poland) Robert Kubica
4	R2	(Germany) Norisring, Nuremberg	(France) Alexandre Prémat	(Poland) Robert Kubica	(France) Alexandre Prémat	(France) ASM F3	(France) Alexandre Prémat
5	R1	(France) Bugatti Circuit, Le Mans	(Austria) Christian Klien	(Finland) Nico Rosberg	(Finland) Nico Rosberg	(Germany) Team Rosberg	(Finland) Nico Rosberg
5	R2	(France) Bugatti Circuit, Le Mans	(France) Olivier Pla	(Poland) Robert Kubica	(Austria) Christian Klien	(Germany) Mücke Motorsport	(Austria) Christian Klien
6	R1	(Germany) Nürburgring	(Austria) Christian Klien	(Germany) Markus Winkelhock	(Germany) Markus Winkelhock	(Germany) Mücke Motorsport	(France) Alexandre Prémat
6	R2	(Germany) Nürburgring	(Austria) Christian Klien	(Austria) Christian Klien	(Austria) Christian Klien	(Germany) Mücke Motorsport	(Austria) Christian Klien
7	R1	(Austria) A1-Ring, Spielberg	(Australia) Ryan Briscoe	(Poland) Robert Kubica	(Australia) Ryan Briscoe	(Italy) Prema Powerteam	(France) Alexandre Prémat
7	R2	(Austria) A1-Ring, Spielberg	(Australia) Ryan Briscoe	(Finland) Nico Rosberg	(Australia) Ryan Briscoe	(Italy) Prema Powerteam	(France) Alexandre Prémat
8	R1	(Netherlands) Circuit Park Zandvoort	(Austria) Christian Klien	(Austria) Christian Klien	(Austria) Christian Klien	(Germany) Mücke Motorsport	(Austria) Christian Klien
8	R2	(Netherlands) Circuit Park Zandvoort	(Austria) Christian Klien	(Australia) Ryan Briscoe	(Australia) Ryan Briscoe	(Italy) Prema Powerteam	(Austria) Christian Klien
9	R1	(Germany) Hockenheimring	(Germany) Markus Winkelhock	(Australia) Ryan Briscoe	(Germany) Timo Glock	(Switzerland) Opel Team KMS	(Greece) Alexandros Margaritis
9	R2	(Germany) Hockenheimring	(Australia) Ryan Briscoe	(Australia) Ryan Briscoe	(Australia) Ryan Briscoe	(Italy) Prema Powerteam	(Austria) Christian Klien
10	R1	(France) Circuit de Nevers Magny-Cours	(Greece) Alexandros Margaritis	(Germany) Markus Winkelhock	(Germany) Markus Winkelhock	(Germany) Mücke Motorsport	(Poland) Robert Kubica
10	R2	(France) Circuit de Nevers Magny-Cours	(Greece) Alexandros Margaritis	(Austria) Christian Klien	(Germany) Timo Glock	(Switzerland) Opel Team KMS	(Austria) Christian Klien

== Season standings ==
=== Drivers Standings ===
- Points are awarded as follows:

	1	2	3	4	5	6	7	8	PP
Race 1 & 2	10	8	6	5	4	3	2	1	**1**

Pos	Driver	HOC1 (Germany)		ADR (Italy)		PAU (France)		NOR (Germany)		LMS (France)		NÜR (Germany)		A1R (Austria)		ZAN (Netherlands)		HOC2 (Germany)		MAG (France)		Points
1	(Australia) Ryan Briscoe	1	1	5	1	1	**2**	4	Ret	3	Ret	Ret	7	**1**	**1**	17	1	17	**1**	14	14	110
2	(Austria) Christian Klien	4	5	**3**	21	Ret	7	Ret	10	**2**	1	**Ret**	**1**	5	5	**1**	**2**	23†	3	Ret	3	89
3	(France) Olivier Pla	**DSQ**	**2**	8	3	2	16†	3	Ret	4	**24**†	2	9	27†	4	3	3	10	6	2	7	74
4	(Germany) Markus Winkelhock	3	4	Ret	17	21†	Ret	Ret	5	8	18	1	2	4	6	4	4	**Ret**	2	1	9	71
5	(Germany) Timo Glock	6	7	1	13	3	Ret	2	3	18	25	14	12	12	9	15	14	1	22	13	1	55
6	(Brazil) Fabio Carbone	11	11	2	10	4	1	5	12	6	2	6	23†	15	12	21	6	4	Ret	3	Ret	55
7	(France) Alexandre Prémat	DSQ	24†	7	5	22†	Ret	**Ret**	**1**	5	23†	5	11	2	2	Ret	5	9	Ret	Ret	5	50
8	(Finland) Nico Rosberg	Ret	3	Ret	**2**	15	17†	8	Ret	1	11	Ret	3	8	3	18	8	7	14	6	Ret	44
9	(Netherlands) Robert Doornbos	2	8	10	6	8	DSQ	12	4	NC	8	3	Ret	10	8	5	7	13	Ret	9	2	40
10	(Canada) Bruno Spengler							19†	Ret	11	3	16	4	3	7	2	Ret	6	5	Ret	21	34
11	(France) Nicolas Lapierre	5	Ret	6	11	**DSQ**	15	6	6	13	5	11	Ret	16	10	9	9	3	7	5	6	33
12	(Poland) Robert Kubica							1	2	27†	7	9	6	11	Ret	7	24†	24†	10	4	8	31
13	(Greece) Alexandros Margaritis	8	25†	9	27†	7	DNS	16	Ret	23	9	10	14	DSQ	17	14	13	2	4	**26**†	**4**	23
14	(France) Simon Abadie	7	Ret	20	19	5	5	17†	Ret	26	6	15	10	23	14	6	Ret	8	8	8	22†	19
15	(Austria) Bernhard Auinger	25	Ret	13	4	Ret	10	20†	Ret	12	4	4	Ret	13	11	Ret	Ret	Ret	13	18	Ret	15
16	(Portugal) César Campaniço	14	6	4	Ret	Ret	8	7	7	14	Ret	13	15	19	Ret					21	18	13
17	(United Kingdom) Adam Carroll													6	Ret	11	15	5	Ret	Ret	17	7
18	(Austria) Richard Lietz	24†	15	15	8	12	9	Ret	19	17	21	Ret	5	18	Ret	19	17	Ret	12	7	Ret	7
19	(Netherlands) Charles Zwolsman Jr.	10	12	Ret	7	17	6	Ret	9	10	14	12	13	7	13	16	18	12	9	11	Ret	7
20	(United Kingdom) Jamie Green					Ret	3									Ret	19	15	Ret	10	10	6
21	(Brazil) Lucas di Grassi			14	18	9	4															5
22	(Japan) Katsuyuki Hiranaka	13	Ret	12	12	6	13	14	Ret	22	17	8	18	26	16	10	10	22†	23	20	13	4
23	(Germany) Marcel Lasée									19	12	7	8	17	Ret			11	Ret			3
24	(Austria) Andreas Zuber	17	9	18	23	20	DNS	Ret	13	7	13	22	Ret	9	Ret	13	12	Ret	21†	25	Ret	2
25	(Portugal) Álvaro Parente	9	13	11	14	11	Ret	Ret	Ret	16	10	DSQ	EX	29†	DSQ	8	11	18	15	12	12	1
26	(Germany) Daniel la Rosa	18	19	17	14	Ret	12	18	8	21	16	Ret	16	14	18	12	20	Ret	11	16	15	1
27	(Japan) Sakon Yamamoto	15	10	22	9	23†	18	Ret	11	9	26†	19	19	22	15	Ret	16	Ret	18	17	11	0
28	(Belgium) Jan Heylen	20	18	19	15	10	DNS	11	17	15	15	Ret	Ret	20	21							0
29	(Australia) James Manderson	21	21	21	Ret	16	14	10	15													0
30	(Italy) Stefano Proetto	16	14	24	16	13	11	Ret	Ret	24	Ret	18	17					16	Ret	15	Ret	0
31	(Germany) Maro Engel	12	16	23	24			Ret	14	20	20											0
32	(Austria) Philipp Baron	Ret	20	26	Ret	19	DNS	13	16	Ret	Ret	DNS	21†	21	Ret	20	21	14	17	19	16	0
33	(Switzerland) Gilles Tinguely	19	17	16	20	14	DNS															0
34	(Switzerland) Harold Primat	22	22	Ret	25	18	Ret	15	18	28†	19	21	24†	24	22	22	22	21	Ret	24	Ret	0
35	(Italy) Claudio Torre									25	22	20	20	25	19			20†	16			0
36	(Germany) Hendrik Vieth											17	22†									0
37	(France) Patrice Manopoulos													28†	20	DNS	23	19	19	23	20	0
38	(Portugal) Nicolas Armindo																	Ret	20	22	19	0
39	(South Korea) Dong-Wook Lee	23	23	25	26																	0
Pos	Driver	HOC1 (Germany)		ADR (Italy)		PAU (France)		NOR (Germany)		LMS (France)		NÜR (Germany)		A1R (Austria)		ZAN (Netherlands)		HOC2 (Germany)		MAG (France)		Points

Colour	Result
Gold	Winner
Silver	Second place
Bronze	Third place
Green	Points classification
Blue	Non-points classification
Blue	Non-classified finish (NC)
Purple	Retired, not classified (Ret)
Red	Did not qualify (DNQ)
Red	Did not pre-qualify (DNPQ)
Black	Disqualified (DSQ)
White	Did not start (DNS)
White	Withdrew (WD)
White	Race cancelled (C)
Blank	Did not practice (DNP)
Blank	Did not arrive (DNA)
Blank	Excluded (EX)

**Bold** – Pole
Italics – Fastest Lap

† — Drivers did not finish the race, but were classified as they completed over 90% of the race distance.

=== Rookie Cup ===
Rookie drivers are only eligible for the Rookie Cup title if they have not previously competed in a national or international Formula 3 championship.

Pos	Driver	HOC1 (Germany)		ADR (Italy)		PAU (France)		NOR (Germany)		LMS (France)		NÜR (Germany)		A1R (Austria)		ZAN (Netherlands)		HOC2 (Germany)		MAG (France)		Points
1	(Austria) Christian Klien	4	5	**3**	21	Ret	7	Ret	10	**2**	1	**Ret**	**1**	5	5	**1**	**2**	23	3	Ret	3	134
2	(Finland) Nico Rosberg	Ret	3	Ret	**2**	15	17	8	Ret	1	11	Ret	3	8	3	18	8	7	14	6	Ret	102
3	(France) Alexandre Prémat	DSQ	24	7	5	22	Ret	**Ret**	**1**	5	23	5	11	2	2	Ret	5	9	Ret	Ret	5	96
4	(Greece) Alexandros Margaritis	8	25	9	27	7	DNS	16	Ret	23	9	10	14	DSQ	17	14	13	2	4	**26**	**4**	88
5	(Poland) Robert Kubica							1	2	27	7	9	6	11	Ret	7	24	24	10	4	8	69
6	(Germany) Daniel la Rosa	18	19	17	14	Ret	12	18	8	21	16	Ret	16	14	18	12	20	Ret	11	16	15	66
7	(Canada) Bruno Spengler							19	Ret	11	3	16	4	3	7	2	Ret	6	5	Ret	21	61
8	(Belgium) Jan Heylen	20	18	19	15	10	DNS	11	17	15	15	Ret	Ret	20	21							41
9	(Austria) Philipp Baron	Ret	20	26	Ret	19	DNS	13	16	Ret	Ret	DNS	21	21	Ret	20	21	14	17	19	16	35
10	(Brazil) Lucas di Grassi			14	18	9	4															28
11	(Germany) Maro Engel	12	16	23	24			Ret	14	20	20											24
12	(France) Patrice Manopoulos													28	20	DNS	23	19	19	23	20	10
13	(Italy) Claudio Torre									25	22	20	20	25	19			20	16			10
14	(Portugal) Nicolas Armindo																	Ret	20	22	19	6
15	(Germany) Hendrik Vieth											17	22									4
Pos	Driver	HOC1 (Germany)		ADR (Italy)		PAU (France)		NOR (Germany)		LMS (France)		NÜR (Germany)		A1R (Austria)		ZAN (Netherlands)		HOC2 (Germany)		MAG (France)		Points

=== Nations Cup ===
	Nation	Points
1	France	166
2	Germany	128
3	Austria	107
4	Australia	105
5	Brazil	60
6	Netherlands	47
7	Finland	45
8	Canada	34
9	Poland	31
10	Greece	21
11	Portugal	14
12	Great Britain	13
13	Japan	4
