= Jamie Green =

British racing driver (born 1982)

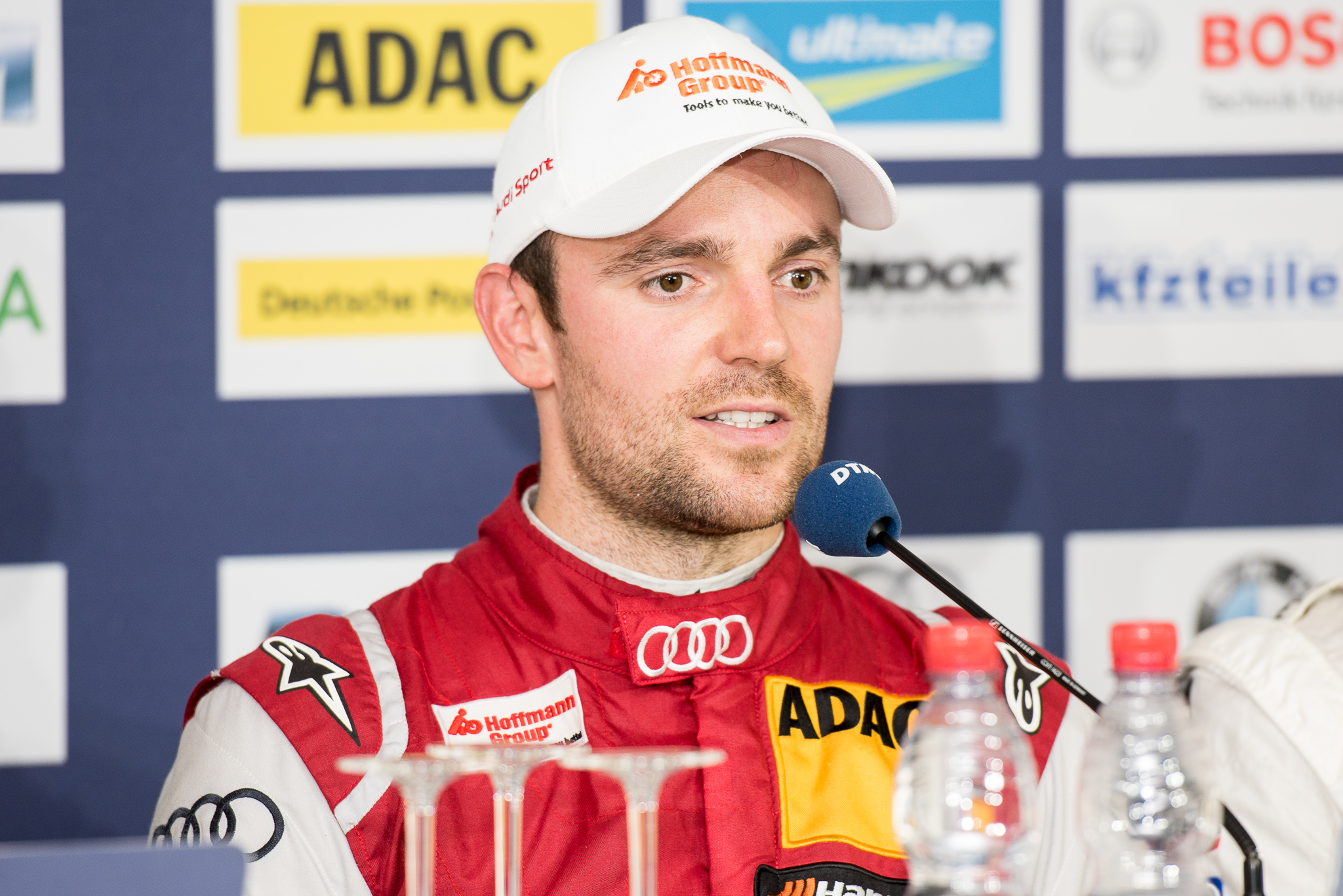
- Green in 2014
- Nationality: (United Kingdom) British
- Born: James Roger Green; 14 June 1982 (age 44) Leicester, Leicestershire, England
- Relatives: Zac Green (son); Will Green (son); Fred Green (nephew)

DTM career
- Debut season: 2005
- Current team: Team Rosberg
- Categorisation: FIA Platinum
- Car number: 53
- Former teams: Persson Motorsport, HWA Team, Abt Sportsline
- Starts: 211
- Wins: 17
- Podiums: 42
- Poles: 15
- Fastest laps: 25
- Best finish: 2nd in 2015

Previous series
- 2002 2003 2004: British Formula Renault; British F3; Formula Three Euroseries

Championship titles
- 2004: Formula Three Euroseries

Awards
- 2002: McLaren Autosport Award

James Roger Green (born 14 June 1982) is a British professional racing driver. He last raced for Audi Sport Team Rosberg in the 2020 DTM season, where he achieved three podiums and finished eighth in the standings.

== Early career ==
Green was born in Leicester. At the age of ten, he entered BriSCA Ministox and won the British Championship in his first season. He then progressed to karting, finishing runner-up in the Junior TKM series in 1996.

In 1997, Green moved up to the Junior ICA Winter Series, in which he won the title, and finished runner-up in the McLaren Mercedes Champions of the Future series. He won the Formula A Winter Series in 2000, then finished runner-up in British Formula A in 2001. He dovetailed the British campaign with the European Formula A championship during 2000 and 2001, in which he achieved two race wins.

== Formula Renault ==
Green's first season in single seater formula cars was spent in the British Formula Renault Winter Series in 2001, in which he achieved a best race finish of second place. The 2002 season was spent in the British Formula Renault championship with Fortec Racing, finishing the year as championship runner-up with two race wins. He also made a one-off appearance in the Formula Renault Eurocup with Fortec's European operation. His Formula Renault career culminated with a win in the Asian Formula Renault Challenge at Macau in November 2002.

== Formula 3 ==
In 2003, Green progressed to the British Formula 3 championship with Carlin Motorsport. He again finished in the runner-up position in his first season and won four races. During that year, he made his debut in the Formula Three Euroseries, competing in three rounds (six races) for Team Kolles and one round (two races) for ASM Formule 3.

2004 saw Green enter his first full season in the Euroseries with ASM, having gained backing from Mercedes-Benz. He achieved seven race wins, six poles, and 139 points en route to the championship title.

== DTM ==
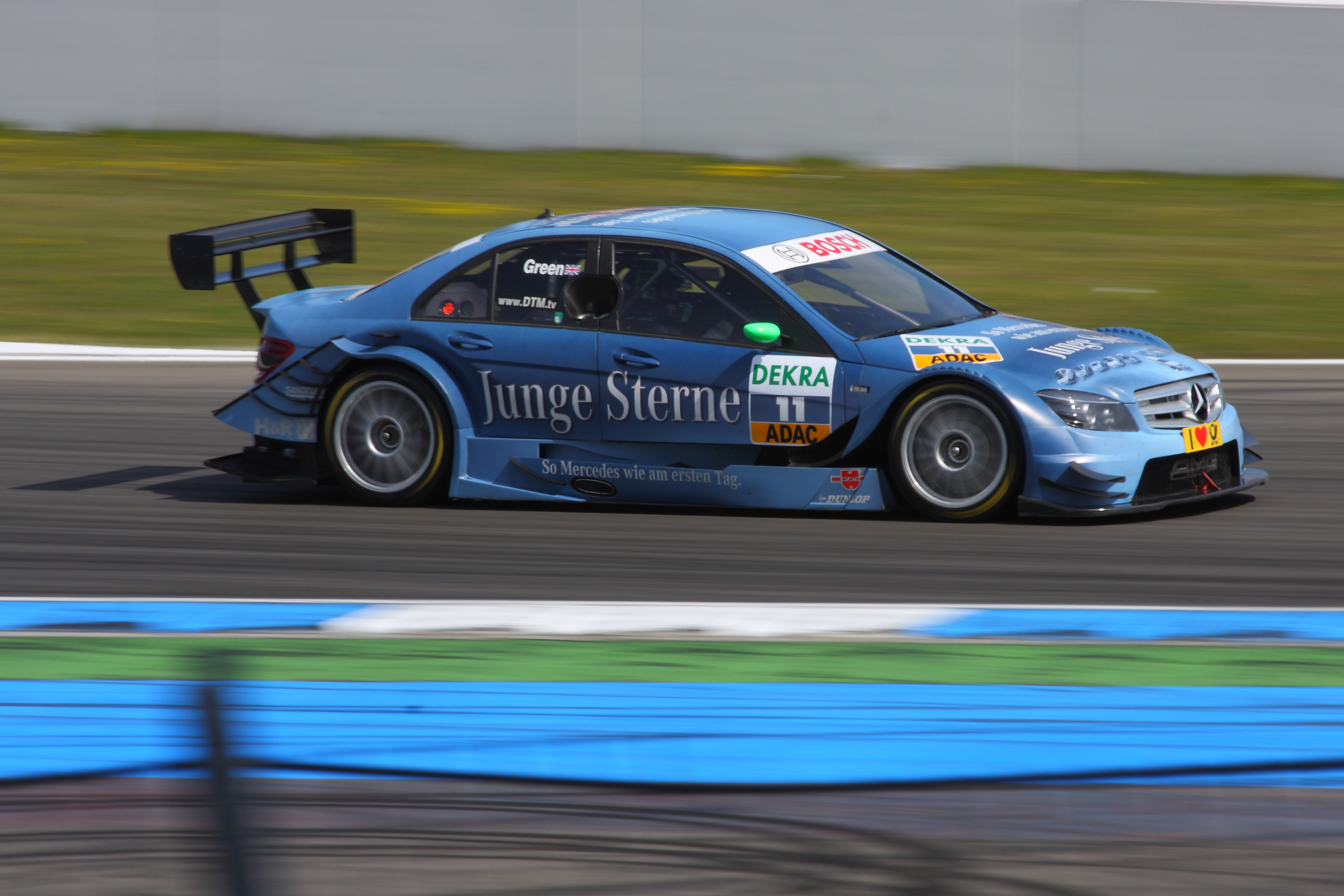
Green finished third at the DTM season-opener at Hockenheim in 2010.

For the 2005 season, Mercedes placed Green in the DTM. He drove one of its customer cars – a 2004 C-class – run by Persson Motorsport, with which he achieved a 6th-place finish on his debut, secured two pole positions and finished 6th overall in the championship standings, with a total of 29 points.

2006 saw him promoted – along with his teammate from Persson, Bruno Spengler – to the factory Mercedes-AMG line-up, run by H.W.A. GmbH, alongside multiple champion Bernd Schneider and former Formula One driver Mika Häkkinen. He achieved four pole positions and a best finish of 2nd place on two occasions, but no wins. He was classified fifth overall, with a total of 31 points. In 2007, he continued to be part of the factory line-up and reached the top step of the podium for the first time with two race wins in the last two rounds of the season. After the 2008 season, despite two victories he was moved into a one-year-old car to make way for former champion Gary Paffett, but was still able to win round four at the Norisring.

== Racing record ==
=== Complete Formula Renault 2.0 UK Championship results ===
(key) (Races in bold indicate pole position; races in italics indicate fastest lap)

Year	Entrant	1	2	3	4	5	6	7	8	9	10	11	12	13	DC	Points
2002	Fortec Motorsport	BRH; Ret	OUL; Ret	THR; 8	**SIL**; 2	THR; 2	BRH; 2	CRO; 2	SNE; 1; 6	SNE; 2; 1	**KNO**; 1	BRH; 3	DON; 1; 4	DON; 2; 5	2nd	279

=== Complete British Formula 3 International Series results ===
(key) (Races in bold indicate pole position; races in italics indicate fastest lap)

Year	Entrant	Engine	1	2	3	4	5	6	7	8	9	10	11	12	13	14	15	16	17	18	19	20	21	22	23	24	DC	Pts
2003	Carlin Motorsport	Mugen	**DON**; **1**; 1	**DON**; **2**; 1	SNE; 1; 5	SNE; 2; 2	CRO; 1 Ret	CRO; 2; 2	KNO; 1 Ret	KNO; 2; 2	SIL; 1; 11	SIL; 2; 4	CAS; 1; 7	CAS; 2; 10	OUL; 1; 4	OUL; 2; 3	ROC; 1; 7	**ROC**; **2**; 1	THR; 1; 3	THR; 2; 1	SPA; 1; 2	SPA; 2; 3	DON; 1; 7	DON; 2; 4	BRH; 1 Ret	BRH; 2; 3	2nd	237

=== Complete Formula 3 Euro Series results ===
(key) (Races in bold indicate pole position) (Races in italics indicate fastest lap)

Year	Entrant	Chassis	Engine	1	2	3	4	5	6	7	8	9	10	11	12	13	14	15	16	17	18	19	20	DC	Points
2003	ASM F3	Dallara F303/005	Mercedes	HOC; 1	HOC; 2	ADR; 1	ADR; 2	PAU; 1 Ret	PAU; 2; 3	NOR; 1	NOR; 2	LMS; 1	LMS; 2	NÜR; 1	NÜR; 2	A1R; 1	A1R; 2							20th	8
2003	Kolles	Dallara F303/076	Mercedes															ZAN; 1 Ret	ZAN; 2; 19	HOC; 1; 15	HOC; 2 Ret	MAG; 1; 10	MAG; 2; 10	20th	8
2004	ASM Formule 3	Dallara F303/006	Mercedes	HOC; 1; 4	**HOC**; **2**; 2	EST; 1; 2	EST; 2; 2	ADR; 1; 1	**ADR**; **1**; 8	PAU; 1; 1	PAU; 2; 3	NOR; 1; 6	**NOR**; **1**; 2	**MAG**; **1**; 1	MAG; 2; 9	**NÜR**; **1**; 2	NÜR; 2; 1	ZAN; 1 DSQ	ZAN; 2; 1	BRN; 1; 1	BRN; 2; 1	HOC; 1; 10	HOC; 2; 2	1st	139

=== Complete Deutsche Tourenwagen Masters results ===
(key) (Races in bold indicate pole position) (Races in italics indicate fastest lap)

Year	Team	Car	1	2	3	4	5	6	7	8	9	10	11	12	13	14	15	16	17	18	19	20	Pos	Points
2005	Persson Motorsport	AMG-Mercedes C-Klasse 2004	HOC; 6	LAU; Ret	SPA; 19†	BRN; 5	OSC; 3	NOR; Ret	NÜR; 8	ZAN; 7	**LAU**; Ret	IST; 4	**HOC**; 2										6th	29
2006	HWA Team	AMG-Mercedes C-Klasse 2006	**HOC**; Ret	**LAU**; 4	OSC; 3	BRH; 2	**NOR**; Ret	NÜR; 9	**ZAN**; 8	CAT; Ret	BUG; 6	HOC; 2											5th	31
2007	HWA Team	AMG-Mercedes C-Klasse 2007	HOC; 6	OSC; 11	LAU; 6	BRH; 6	NOR; 6	MUG; Ret	ZAN; 11	NÜR; 5	CAT; 1	HOC; 1											4th	34.5
2008	HWA Team	AMG-Mercedes C-Klasse 2008	HOC; 6	OSC; 5	MUG; 1	LAU; 5	NOR; 1	ZAN; 6	NÜR; 3	BRH; 4	CAT; 8	BUG; 10	HOC; 3										4th	52
2009	Persson Motorsport	AMG-Mercedes C-Klasse 2008	HOC; 8	LAU; 6	NOR; 1	ZAN; 9	OSC; 9	NÜR; 5	BRH; 12	CAT; 14	DIJ; 4	HOC; 5											7th	27
2010	Persson Motorsport	AMG-Mercedes C-Klasse 2008	HOC; 3	VAL; 9	LAU; 3	NOR; 1	NÜR; 5	ZAN; 10	BRH; 10	OSC; 7	HOC; 8	ADR; 12	SHA; 6										6th	32
2011	HWA Team	AMG-Mercedes C-Klasse 2009	HOC; 7	ZAN; 4	SPL; 6	LAU; 6	NOR; 2	NÜR; 6	BRH; 8	OSC; 11	VAL; 10	HOC; 1											5th	35
2012	HWA Team	AMG-Mercedes C-Klasse Coupé	HOC; 2	LAU; 4	BRH; 8	SPL; 5	NOR; 1	NÜR; 4	ZAN; 4	OSC; 3	VAL; 10	HOC; 4											3rd	121
2013	Abt Sportsline	Audi RS5 DTM	HOC; 14	BRH; 15	SPL; 18	LAU; 5	NOR; 19†	MSC; 6	NÜR; 9	**OSC**; 3	ZAN; 13	HOC; 12											11th	35
2014	Audi Sport Team Rosberg	Audi RS5 DTM	HOC; Ret	OSC; 18†	HUN; 7	NOR; 2	MSC; Ret	SPL; 8	NÜR; 15	LAU; 17†	ZAN; 14	HOC; 3											10th	43
2015	Audi Sport Team Rosberg	Audi RS5 DTM	**HOC**; **1**; 1	HOC; 2; 13	LAU; 1; 1	**LAU**; **2**; 1	NOR; 1; 7	NOR; 2; 18	ZAN; 1; 19	ZAN; 2; 13	SPL; 1 Ret	SPL; 2; 17	MSC; 1; 4	MSC; 2; 5	OSC; 1 Ret	OSC; 2; 8	NÜR; 1 Ret	NÜR; 2; 17	HOC; 1; 2	HOC; 2; 1			2nd	150
2016	Audi Sport Team Rosberg	Audi RS5 DTM	HOC; 1; 15	HOC; 2 Ret	SPL; 1; 14	**SPL**; **2**; 3	LAU; 1; 2	LAU; 2; 4	NOR; 1; 2	NOR; 2; 17†	ZAN; 1; 5	**ZAN**; **2**; 1	MSC; 1; 7	MSC; 2; 22	NÜR; 1; 3	NÜR; 2; 16	HUN; 1; 2	HUN; 2 Ret	HOC; 1; 8	HOC; 2; 8			3rd	145
2017	Audi Sport Team Rosberg	Audi RS5 DTM	HOC; 1; 18	HOC; 2; 1	LAU; 1; 10	LAU; 2; 1	HUN; 1 DSQ	HUN; 2; 5	NOR; 1; 7	NOR; 2; 8	MSC; 1; 9	MSC; 2; 5	ZAN; 1; 5	ZAN; 2; 9	NÜR; 1; 6	NÜR; 2; 7	**SPL**; **1**; 2	**SPL**; **2**; 14	HOC; 1; 1	HOC; 2; 5			3rd	173
2018	Audi Sport Team Rosberg	Audi RS5 DTM	HOC; 1; 19	HOC; 2; 17	LAU; 1 Ret	LAU; 2; 6	HUN; 1; 9	HUN; 2; 13	NOR; 1; 11	NOR; 2; 15	ZAN; 1; 10	ZAN; 2; 14	BRH; 1; 11	BRH; 2; 15	MIS; 1 Ret	MIS; 2; 8	NÜR; 1; 14	NÜR; 2; 15	SPL; 1; 5	SPL; 2; 12	HOC; 1; 13	HOC; 2; 16	18th	27
2019	Audi Sport Team Rosberg	Audi RS5 Turbo DTM	HOC; 1; 12	HOC; 2; 9	ZOL; 1; 6	ZOL; 2; 3	MIS; 1	MIS; 2	NOR; 1; 11	NOR; 2; 2	ASS; 1; 7	ASS; 2; 9	BRH; 1; 11	BRH; 2; 15	LAU; 1; 10	**LAU**; **2**; 4	NÜR; 1; 6	**NÜR**; **2**; 1	HOC; 1; 12	HOC; 2; 5			8th	115
2020	Audi Sport Team Rosberg	Audi RS5 Turbo DTM	SPA; 1; 2	SPA; 2; 4	LAU; 1; 8	LAU; 2 Ret	LAU; 1; 10	LAU; 2; 4	ASS; 1 NC	ASS; 2; 12	NÜR; 1; 13	NÜR; 2; 7	NÜR; 1; 14†	NÜR; 2; 15†	ZOL; 1 Ret	ZOL; 2; 15	ZOL; 1; 8	ZOL; 2; 5	HOC; 1; 3	HOC; 2; 3			8th	98

^{†} Driver did not finish, but was classified as he completed 75% of the race distance.

=== Complete Blancpain GT World Challenge Europe results ===
Year	Team	Car	Class	1	2	3	4	5	6	7	8	9	10	Pos.	Points
2017	Belgian Audi Club Team WRT	Audi R8 LMS	Pro	MIS; QR; 12	MIS; CR; 24	BRH; QR	BRH; CR	ZOL; QR	ZOL; CR	HUN; QR	HUN; CR	NÜR; QR	NÜR; CR	NC	0
2019	Phoenix Racing	Audi R8 LMS	Pro	BRH; 1	BRH; 2	MIS; 1	MIS; 2	ZAN; 1	ZAN; 2	NÜR; 1; 17	NÜR; 2; 9	HUN; 1; 14	HUN; 2; 11	23rd	1

== Other achievements ==
In 2002, Green won the McLaren Autosport BRDC Young Driver of the Year award, beating five other nominated finalists in a series of on-track trials in touring cars and formula single-seaters.

Green's brother Nigel is a leading exponent in BriSCA Formula 2 and Formula 1 Stock Car racing. Nigel won the 2017 BriSCA F1 World Championship. Green's sons Zac and Will Green are also racing drivers, currently contesting karting. In December 2024, Will was announced as a new signing to the Williams Driver Academy.

== Championship titles ==
- 2004 Formula 3 Euroseries
- 2000 Formula A British Super Libre Winter Series
- 1997 Junior ICA British Winter Series
- 1992 Brisca Ministox British Championship

Sporting positions
Preceded by Ryan Briscoe	Formula 3 Euro Series; Champion; 2004	Succeeded by Lewis Hamilton
Awards
Preceded by Steven Kane	McLaren Autosport BRDC Award; 2002	Succeeded by Alex Lloyd
