= Daniel la Rosa =

German racing driver (born 1985)

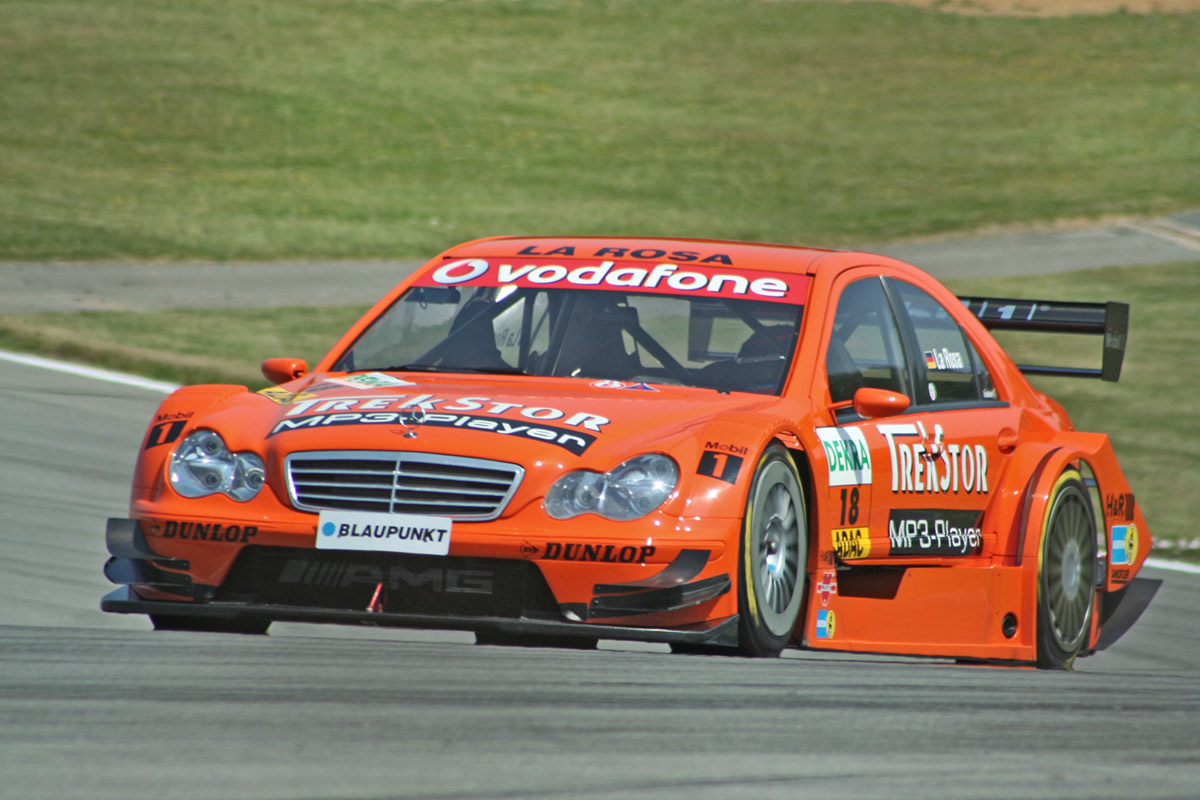
- Daniel driving his 2006 DTM car at Brands Hatch
- Nationality: (Germany) German
- Born: 10 October 1985 (age 41) Hanau, (West Germany)
- Categorisation: FIA Silver

Previous series
- 2006–07 2005 2004 2003–04 2002 2001: Deutsche Tourenwagen Masters; Formula Renault 3.5 Series; Italian Formula Three Championship; Formula Three Euroseries; Formula Volkswagen Germany; Formula König

Daniel la Rosa (born 10 October 1985 in Hanau, West Germany) is a German former racing driver.

== Motor Racing ==
Following several years in kart racing, la Rosa moved to the open wheel Formula König series in 2001. He finished third in the championship, winning one race, five podiums and a fastest lap. The following season, la Rosa joined Formula Volkswagen where he won one race, finishing the season in eighth place. He would move to the Formula 3 Euroseries in 2003, racing for MB Racing in the Opel-powered Dallara. After scoring one point that season, in 2004, la Rosa moved teams and scored 15 points with one podium, in a season where he also competed in one race of the Masters of Formula 3, and two in the Italian Formula 3 series.

For 2005, la Rosa stepped up to Formula Renault 3.5 with Interwetten Racing. His season started poorly, when he opted not to start the first two rounds at Zolder. However, a podium at Le Mans was a highlight of a season where he would ultimately finish 18th.

La Rosa's open wheel racing career stalled, and he moved to the Deutsche Tourenwagen Masters with Mücke Motorsport, racing for Mercedes. He would finish the season in 15th. For 2007, la Rosa continued racing for Mercedes but now with TrekStor AMG, for whom he scored a podium at the opening round of the season at the Hockenheimring. He was released from the team at the end of the season.

In 2008, la Rosa tested for the Superleague Formula series. He wouldn't race competitively until 2010, winning the one race he entered in the Volkswagen Scirocco R Cup Germany. His last competitive race came in the same series in 2011.

== After racing ==
Following his racing career, la Rosa works as a sales consultant for Porsche Centre Aschaffenburg.

== Racing record ==
=== Complete Formula Three Euro Series results ===
(key) (Races in bold indicate pole position) (Races in italics indicate fastest lap)

Year	Entrant	Chassis	Engine	1	2	3	4	5	6	7	8	9	10	11	12	13	14	15	16	17	18	19	20	DC	Points
2003	MB Racing Performance	Dallara F302/083	Opel	HOC; 1; 18	HOC; 2; 19	ADR; 1; 17	ADR; 2; 14	PAU; 1 Ret	PAU; 2; 12	NOR; 1; 18	NOR; 2; 8	LMS; 1; 21	LMS; 2; 16†	NÜR; 1 Ret	NÜR; 2; 16	A1R; 1; 14	A1R; 2; 18	ZAN; 1; 12	ZAN; 2; 20	HOC; 1 Ret	HOC; 2; 11	MAG; 1; 16	MAG; 2; 15	26th	1
2004	HBR Motorsport	Dallara F304/012	Opel	HOC; 1; 25†	HOC; 2; 9	EST; 1; 11	EST; 2; 11	ADR; 1; 18	ADR; 1; 3	PAU; 1 DNS	PAU; 2 DNS	NOR; 1; 10	NOR; 1 Ret	MAG; 1; 15	MAG; 2; 15	NÜR; 1; 4	NÜR; 2 Ret	ZAN; 1; 7	ZAN; 2; 7	BRN; 1 Ret	BRN; 2; 15	HOC; 1 Ret	HOC; 2; 12	14th	15

† Driver did not finish the race, but was classified as he completed over 90% of the race distance.

=== Complete Formula Renault 3.5 Series results ===
(key) (Races in bold indicate pole position) (Races in italics indicate fastest lap)

Year	Entrant	1	2	3	4	5	6	7	8	9	10	11	12	13	14	15	16	17	DC	Points
2005	Interwetten.com	ZOL; 1 DNS	ZOL; 2 DNS	MON; 1; 8	VAL; 1; 13	VAL; 2; 13	LMS; 1; 2	LMS; 2 Ret	BIL; 1; 12	BIL; 2 Ret	OSC; 1; 8	OSC; 2 Ret	DON; 1; 24	DON; 2 Ret	EST; 1	EST; 2	MNZ; 1	MNZ; 2	18th	18

=== Complete DTM results ===
(key)

Year	Team	Car	1	2	3	4	5	6	7	8	9	10	Pos	Points
2006	Mücke Motorsport	AMG-Mercedes C-Klasse 2005	HOC; 14	LAU; Ret	OSC; 11	BRH; 12	NOR; Ret	NÜR; 16	ZAN; 10	CAT; 7	BUG; Ret	HOC; Ret	15th	2
2007	Mücke Motorsport	AMG-Mercedes C-Klasse 2006	HOC; 3	OSC; 14	LAU; 16	BRH; Ret	NOR; 12	MUG; 5	ZAN; DNS	NÜR; 14	CAT; DSQ	HOC; 10	13th	10
