= Bernhard Auinger =

Austrian racing driver (born 1982)

Bernhard Auinger (21 February 1982 in Salzburg, Austria) is a race car driver. In 2003, he drove two races of the Formula 3000 season for Red Bull, having previously competed in Italian Formula Three (2002) and German Formula Three (2000–2002). He was the 2000 German Formula König champion. He raced in Euroseries 3000 from 2003 to 2005, winning one race in 2004. He then only raced two times in ADAC GT Masters in 2013 after that, before retiring.

== Racing record ==
=== Complete Formula 3 Euro Series results ===
(key) (Races in bold indicate pole position) (Races in italics indicate fastest lap)

Year	Entrant	Chassis	Engine	1	2	3	4	5	6	7	8	9	10	11	12	13	14	15	16	17	18	19	20	DC	Points
2003	Superfund TME	Dallara F302/088	Toyota	HOC; 1; 25	HOC; 2 Ret	ADR; 1; 13	ADR; 2; 4	PAU; 1 Ret	PAU; 2; 10	NOR; 1; 20	NOR; 2 Ret	LMS; 1; 12	LMS; 2; 4	NÜR; 1; 4	NÜR; 2 Ret	A1R; 1; 13	A1R; 2; 11	ZAN; 1 Ret	ZAN; 2 Ret	HOC; 3 Ret	HOC; 4; 13	MAG; 1; 18	MAG; 2 Ret	15th	15
Sources:																								15th	15

=== Complete International Formula 3000 results ===
(key) (Races in bold indicate pole position; races in italics indicate fastest lap.)

Year	Entrant	1	2	3	4	5	6	7	8	9	10	DC	Points
2003	Red Bull Junior Team F3000	IMO	CAT	A1R; 11	MON; 9	NUR	MAG	SIL	HOC	HUN	MNZ	NC	0
