= Eifelrennen =

Annual motor race

The Eifelrennen was an annual motor race, organised by ADAC Automobile Club from 1922 to 2003, held in Germany's Eifel mountain region. Like other races of its time it was first held on public roads. In 1927 it was moved to the newly-built Nürburgring.

== History ==
Starting from 1922, the first races were held on a 33 km long combination of public roads around Nideggen, Wollersheim, Vlatten, Heimbach, Hasenfeld and other villages in the Eifel mountains, similar to the Targa Florio which was a very important race at that time, and popular in Germany due to two wins by Mercedes (still without Benz then).

In 1922, all vehicles were allowed, cars, motorbikes, and even bicycles with supporting engines. Over 100 entrants showed up to compete in the 10-lap event. The track was not paved, and muddy after heavy rains. From 1924 to 1926, the races for 2 and 4 wheels were held on separate days, and classes were introduced. Still, several fatal accidents happened. Even spectator stands collapsed, caused by stormy weather.

The unsatisfying safety situation led to the construction of the Nürburgring circuit in that area, which was inaugurated on Saturday, 18 June 1927 by the 5. Eifelrennen weekend, starting with motorcycle races. On Sunday, Rudolf Caracciola won the first car race on a Mercedes-Benz S.

The Südschleife was used instead of the Nordschleife from 1928 until 1931 and from 1958 until 1968.

The connection between the motorcycle and car races was discontinued in 1974, when organisers, drivers and German motorcycle Grand Prix riders disagreed on the best way to make the track safe for both kinds of racing – with straw bales or without? As a result, international contenders for the motorcycle World Championships boycotted the races, leaving the GP wins to rather unknown Germans (even to German fans) who decided to ride anyway.

After the modern Grand Prix track was built at the Nürburgring in 1984 and F2 was replaced with F3000, the Eifelrennen was discontinued as it always was associated with the long Nordschleife.

Later, the trademark was given to a standard rounds of the Deutsche Tourenwagen Meisterschaft and STW touring car racing on this short GP track. Often two separate races were held, thus two winners.

The last Eifelrennen was held in early May 2003 when several races were held, including an VLN endurance race on the full length combined course (25.9 km) in preparation for the 24 Hours Nürburgring race three weeks later.

Currently there are no major race series cooperating with the ADAC to host a weekend as Eifelrennen.

== ADAC Eifelrennen winners (motorcycles) ==
Deutsche Tourist-Trophäe (German Tourist Trophy)

- 1922: Sixtus Meyer, Harley-Davidson 1000 ccm
- 1923: No race
- 1924: Franz Bieber, BMW; Robert "Robby" Jecker, Harley-Davidson (1000cc)
- 1925: Paul Weyres
- 1926
- 1927: Toni Ulmen

== ADAC Eifelrennen winners (automobiles) ==
- 1922: Kurt C. Volkhart, Steiger
- 1923: No race
- 1924: Wetzka / Haide, Austro-Daimler
- 1925
- 1926: Felten, Mannesmann

== ADAC Eifelrennen winners (automobiles) on the Nürburgring ==
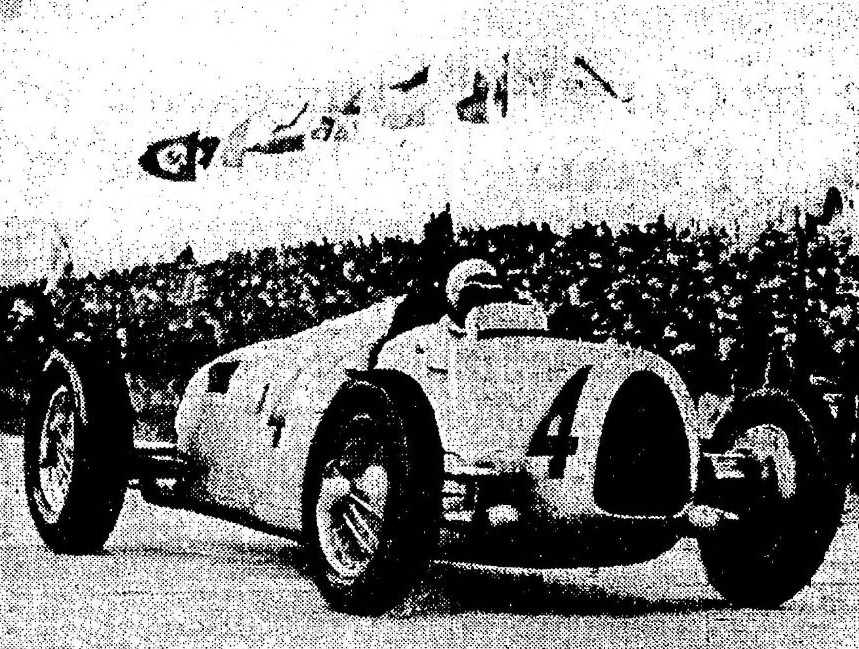
1936 and 1937 winner Bernd Rosemeyer during the 1936 race.

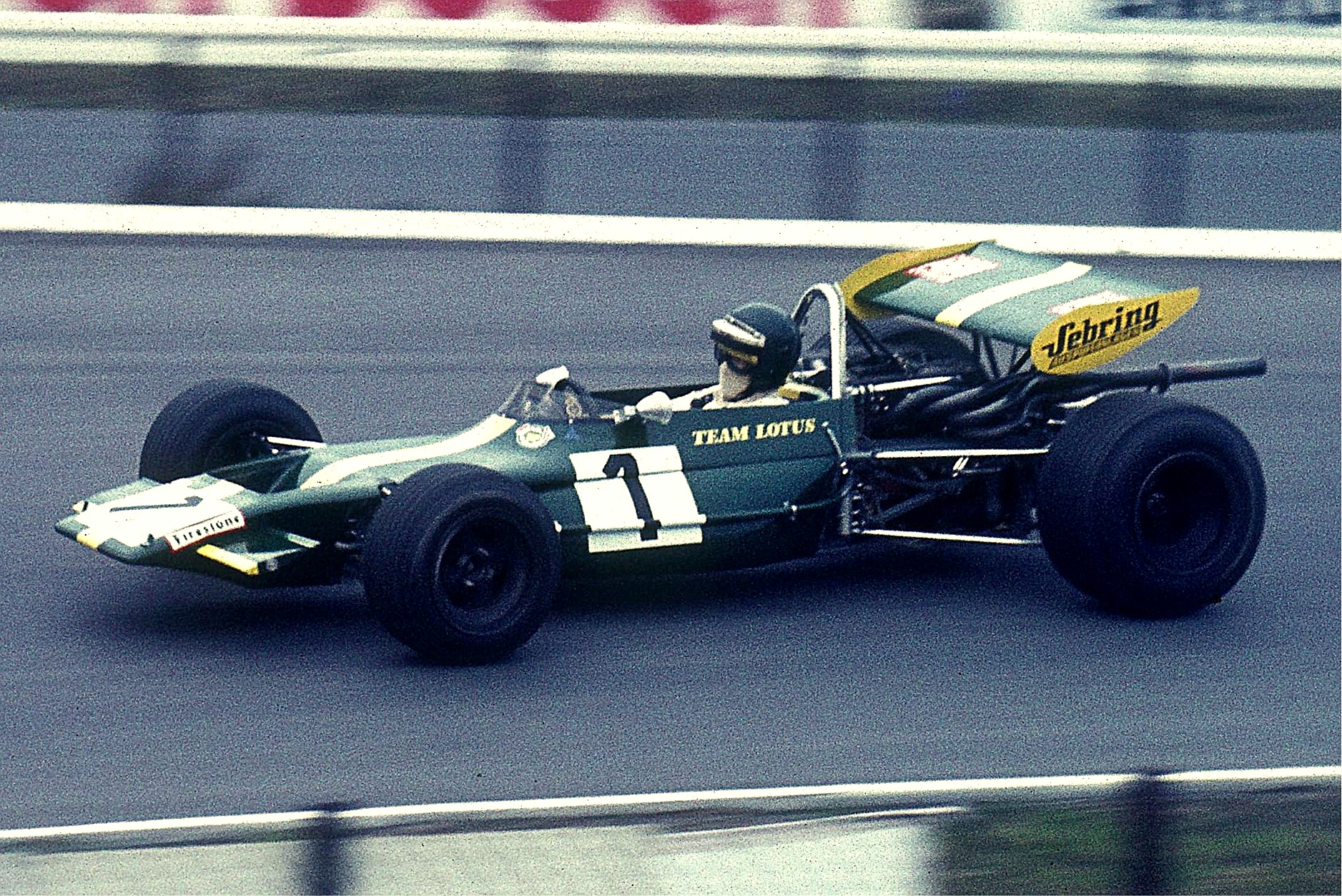
1966, 1967 and 1970 winner Jochen Rindt during the 1970 race.

Year	Winner	Car	Class
1927	(Germany) Rudolf Caracciola	Mercedes-Benz	Sports car
1928	(Germany) Otto Spandel	Steyr	Sports car
1929	(Germany) W. Bartsch	Amilcar	Sports car
1930	(Germany) Heinrich-Joachim von Morgen	Bugatti	Grand Prix
1931	(Germany) Rudolf Caracciola	Mercedes-Benz	Grand Prix
1932	(Germany) Rudolf Caracciola	Alfa Romeo	Grand Prix
1933	(Italy) Tazio Nuvolari	Alfa Romeo	Grand Prix
1934	(Germany) Manfred von Brauchitsch	Mercedes-Benz	Grand Prix
1935	(Germany) Rudolf Caracciola	Mercedes-Benz	Grand Prix
1936	(Germany) Bernd Rosemeyer	Auto Union	Grand Prix
1937	(Germany) Bernd Rosemeyer	Auto Union	Grand Prix
1938	No Race		
1939	(Germany) Hermann Lang	Mercedes-Benz	Grand Prix
1940 – 1948	No Race		
1949	(West Germany) Karl Kling	Veritas	Sports car
1950	(West Germany) Fritz Riess	AFM-BMW	Formula 2
1951	(West Germany) Paul Pietsch	Veritas	Formula 2
1952	(Switzerland) Rudi Fischer	Ferrari	Formula 2
1953	(Switzerland) Toulo de Graffenried	Maserati	Formula 2
1954	(West Germany) Karl-Günther Bechem	Borgward	Sports car
1955	(Argentina) Juan Manuel Fangio	Mercedes-Benz	Sports car
1956	(West Germany) Walter Schock	Mercedes-Benz	GT
1957	(Switzerland) Heini Walter	Porsche	GT
1958	(West Germany) Wolfgang Seidel	Ferrari	GT
1959	(West Germany) Wolfgang von Trips	Stanguellini-Fiat	Formula Junior
1960	(United Kingdom) Dennis Taylor	Lola-Ford	Formula Junior
1961	(Switzerland) Jo Siffert	Lotus-Ford	Formula Junior
1962	(United Kingdom) Peter Warr	Lotus-Ford	Formula Junior
1963	(West Germany) Gerhard Mitter	Lotus-DKW	Formula Junior
1964	(United Kingdom) Jim Clark	Lotus-Ford	Formula 2, Südschleife
1965	(Australia) Paul Hawkins	Alexis-Ford	Formula 2, Südschleife
1966	(Austria) Jochen Rindt	Brabham-Ford	Formula 2, Südschleife
1967	(Austria) Jochen Rindt	Brabham-Ford	Formula 2, Südschleife
1968	(United Kingdom) Chris Irwin	Lola-Ford	Formula 2, Südschleife
1969	(United Kingdom) Jackie Stewart	Matra-Ford	Formula 2, Nordschleife
1970	(Austria) Jochen Rindt	Lotus-Ford	Formula 2, Nordschleife
1971	(France) François Cevert	Tecno-Ford	Formula 2, Nordschleife
1972	(West Germany) Jochen Mass	March-Ford	Formula 2, Nordschleife
1973	(Sweden) Reine Wisell	GRD-Ford	Formula 2, Nordschleife
1974	No Race		
1975	(France) Jacques Laffite	Martini-BMW	Formula 2, Nordschleife
1976	(Sweden) Freddy Kottulinsky	Ralt-BMW	Formula 2, Nordschleife
1977	(West Germany) Jochen Mass	March-BMW	Formula 2, Nordschleife
1978	(Brazil) Alex Ribeiro	March-Hart	Formula 2, Nordschleife
1979	(Switzerland) Marc Surer	March-BMW	Formula 2, Nordschleife
1980	(Italy) Teo Fabi	March-BMW	Formula 2, Nordschleife
1981	(Belgium) Thierry Boutsen	March-BMW	Formula 2, Nordschleife
1982	(Belgium) Thierry Boutsen	Spirit-Honda	Formula 2, Nordschleife
1983	(Italy) Beppe Gabbiani	March-BMW	Formula 2, shortened Nordschleife
1984	No Race		
1985	Cancelled due to snow		
1986	(West Germany) Volker Weidler	Mercedes-Benz	DTM, GP track
1987	(West Germany) Manuel Reuter	Ford	DTM
1988	(Denmark) Kurt Thiim	BMW	DTM
1988	(France) Dany Snobeck	Mercedes-Benz	DTM
1989	(United Kingdom) Steve Soper	BMW	DTM
1989	(United Kingdom) Steve Soper	BMW	DTM
1990	(United Kingdom) Steve Soper	BMW	DTM
1990	(United Kingdom) Steve Soper	BMW	DTM
1991	(Germany) Klaus Ludwig	Mercedes-Benz	DTM
1991	(Germany) Klaus Ludwig	Mercedes-Benz	DTM
1992	(Germany) Frank Biela	Audi	DTM
1992	(Germany) Roland Asch	Mercedes-Benz	DTM
1993	(Italy) Nicola Larini	Alfa Romeo	DTM
1993	(Germany) Klaus Ludwig	Mercedes-Benz	DTM
1994	(Germany) Klaus Ludwig	Mercedes-Benz	DTM
1994	(Italy) Nicola Larini	Alfa Romeo	DTM
1995	(Germany) Bernd Schneider (Germany) Bernd Schneider		DTM
1996	(Germany) Jörg van Ommen (Germany) Manuel Reuter		DTM
1997	(France) Laurent Aïello (France) Laurent Aiello		STW
1998	(Germany) Roland Asch (Venezuela) Johnny Cecotto		STW
1999	(Denmark) Tom Kristensen (Germany) Manuel Reuter		STW
2000	(Germany) Manuel Reuter (Germany) Manuel Reuter		DTM
2001	(France) Laurent Aiello		DTM
2002	No Race		
2003	(Italy) Gianmaria Bruni	Lola T99/50-Zytek	Formula 3000
2004	(United Kingdom) Allan McNish (Switzerland) Pierre Kaffer	Audi	LMES
