= Volker Strycek =

German racing driver (born 1957)

Volker Strycek (born 13 October 1957 in Essen) is a German racecar driver who currently competes in the Nürburgring Langstrecken-Serie for BITTER Opel. He is also an automobile manager.

In 1984, Strycek became the first Deutsche Tourenwagen Meisterschaft champion, driving a BMW 635 CSi, without winning a race. He did not win a DTM race either when driving for Opel from 1989 to 1996.

After the original DTM faltered, Strycek became a manager for Opel, leading the Opel Performance Center (OPC). He entered a DTM-Calibra on the Nürburgring Nordschleife in 1999, and in 2002 raced new DTM-Opel Astra there. Strycek's testing at the Nürburgring resulted in several factory teams entering the 24 Hours Nürburgring in 2003, and Strycek won together with three of his employees.

Strycek continues to race, appearing once again in an Opel at the 2019 24 Hours of Nürburgring with the famous foxtail Manta. Despite crashing in the race, his team would re-join the race on the last lap after repairs. His most recent motorsport appearance being at the 2025 24 Hours of Nürburgring, driving a McLaren Artura Trophy Evo for Dörr Motorsport with Ben Dörr, winning the SP8T class.

Strycek, who is married and has two children, has been a professor at Technische Universität Berlin since 2006 and since 2007 Automobilclub von Deutschland Sportpräsident.

== Racing record ==
=== Complete Deutsche Tourenwagen Meisterschaft results ===
(key) (Races in bold indicate pole position) (Races in italics indicate fastest lap)

Year	Team	Car	1	2	3	4	5	6	7	8	9	10	11	12	13	14	15	16	17	18	19	20	21	22	23	24	Pos.	Pts
1984	Gubin-Sport	BMW 635 CSi	ZOL; 3	HOC; 2	AVU; 8	AVU; 3	MFA; 3	WUN; 6	NÜR; 7	NÜR; 6	NOR; 4	NÜR; 4	DIE; 6	HOC; 7	HOC; 7	ZOL; 2	NÜR; 5										1st	155
1985	Gubin-Sport	BMW 635 CSi	ZOL; 11	WUN; 6	AVU; 17	MFA; 5	ERD; 9	ERD; 14	DIE; 2	DIE; 5	ZOL; Ret	SIE; 10	NÜR; 9														9th	80
1986	Gubin Sport Star Team	BMW 325i	ZOL; 12	HOC; 13	NÜR; 8	AVU; 9	MFA; 6	WUN; 9	NÜR; 6	ZOL; 5	NÜR; 8																5th	95
1987	Gubin-Sport	BMW 635 CSi	HOC; 7	ZOL; Ret	NÜR; Ret	AVU; 14	MFA; 11	NOR; 12	NÜR; Ret	WUN	DIE	SAL															20th	32
1988	Gubin-Sport	BMW M3	ZOL; 1 Ret	ZOL; 2 DNS	HOC; 1	HOC; 2	NÜR; 1; 6	NÜR; 2; 16	BRN; 1	BRN; 2	AVU; 1	AVU; 2	MFA; 1	MFA; 2	NÜR; 1	NÜR; 2	NOR; 1	NOR; 2	WUN; 1	WUN; 2	SAL; 1	SAL; 2	HUN; 1	HUN; 2			32nd	16
1988	Bemani Toyota Schweiz	Toyota Supra 3.0i MA70																							HOC; 1 DNS	HOC; 2 DNS	32nd	16
1989	Kissling Motorsport	Opel Kadett GSi 16V	ZOL; 1 Ret	ZOL; 2 Ret	HOC; 1; 20	HOC; 2; 25	NÜR; 1; 13	NÜR; 2 Ret	MFA; 1 Ret	MFA; 2 DNS	AVU; 1; 14	AVU; 2 Ret	NÜR; 1 Ret	NÜR; 2; 19	NOR; 1 Ret	NOR; 2 DNS	HOC; 1; 21	HOC; 2; 16	DIE; 1 Ret	DIE; 2; 24	NÜR; 1 Ret	NÜR; 2; 19	HOC; 1 Ret	HOC; 2 Ret			33rd	14
1990	Opel Team Irmscher	Opel Omega 3000 24v	ZOL; 1	ZOL; 2	HOC; 1	HOC; 2	NÜR; 1	NÜR; 2	AVU; 1	AVU; 2	MFA; 1	MFA; 2	WUN; 1	WUN; 2	NÜR; 1	NÜR; 2	NOR; 1	NOR; 2	DIE; 1	DIE; 2	NÜR; 1 DNS	NÜR; 2 DNS	HOC; 1; 8	HOC; 2 Ret			28th	3
1991	Opel Team Irmscher	Opel Omega 3000 Evo 500	ZOL; 1	ZOL; 2	HOC; 1 Ret	HOC; 2 DNS	NÜR; 1 Ret	NÜR; 2 Ret	AVU; 1; 21	AVU; 2; 13	WUN; 1 NC	WUN; 2; 13	NOR; 1 DNQ	NOR; 2 DNQ	DIE; 1; 14	DIE; 2; 9	NÜR; 1 Ret	NÜR; 2 DNS	ALE; 1; 16	ALE; 2; 11	HOC; 1 Ret	HOC; 2; 23	BRN; 1	BRN; 2	DON; 1	DON; 2	26th	2
1992	Irmscher Motorsport	Opel Omega 3000 Evo 500	ZOL; 1	ZOL; 2	NÜR; 1	NÜR; 2	WUN; 1	WUN; 2	AVU; 1	AVU; 2	HOC; 1	HOC; 2	NÜR; 1 DNS	NÜR; 2 DNS	NOR; 1	NOR; 2	BRN; 1	BRN; 2	DIE; 1	DIE; 2	ALE; 1	ALE; 2	NÜR; 1	NÜR; 2	HOC; 1	HOC; 2	NC	0
1993	Kissling Motorsport	Opel Omega 3000 24V Evo	ZOL; 1; 14	ZOL; 2; 16	HOC; 1 Ret	HOC; 2 DNS	NÜR; 1 Ret	NÜR; 2 Ret	WUN; 1; 12	WUN; 2 Ret	NÜR; 1; 20	NÜR; 2; 9	NOR; 1 Ret	NOR; 2; 11	DON; 1; 12	DON; 2; 12	DIE; 1; 14	DIE; 2; 13	ALE; 1; 13	ALE; 2; 11	AVU; 1; 13	AVU; 2; 11	HOC; 1	HOC; 2			19th	2

=== Complete International Touring Car Championship results ===
(key) (Races in bold indicate pole position) (Races in italics indicate fastest lap)

Year	Team	Car	1	2	3	4	5	6	7	8	9	10	11	12	13	14	15	16	17	18	19	20	21	22	23	24	25	26	Pos.	Pts
1996	Opel Team Joest	Opel Calibra V6 4x4	HOC; 1	HOC; 2	NÜR; 1	NÜR; 2	EST; 1	EST; 2	HEL; 1	HEL; 2	NOR; 1	NOR; 2	DIE; 1	DIE; 2	SIL; 1	SIL; 2	NÜR; 1; 19	NÜR; 2; 19	MAG; 1	MAG; 2									32nd	0
1996	Zakspeed Opel	Opel Calibra V6 4x4																			MUG; 1; 19	MUG; 2 Ret	HOC; 1	HOC; 2	INT; 1	INT; 2	SUZ; 1	SUZ; 2	32nd	0

Sporting positions
Preceded by None	German Touring Car Champion; 1984	Succeeded by Per Stureson
