= Bernd Schneider (racing driver) =

German racing driver (born 1964)

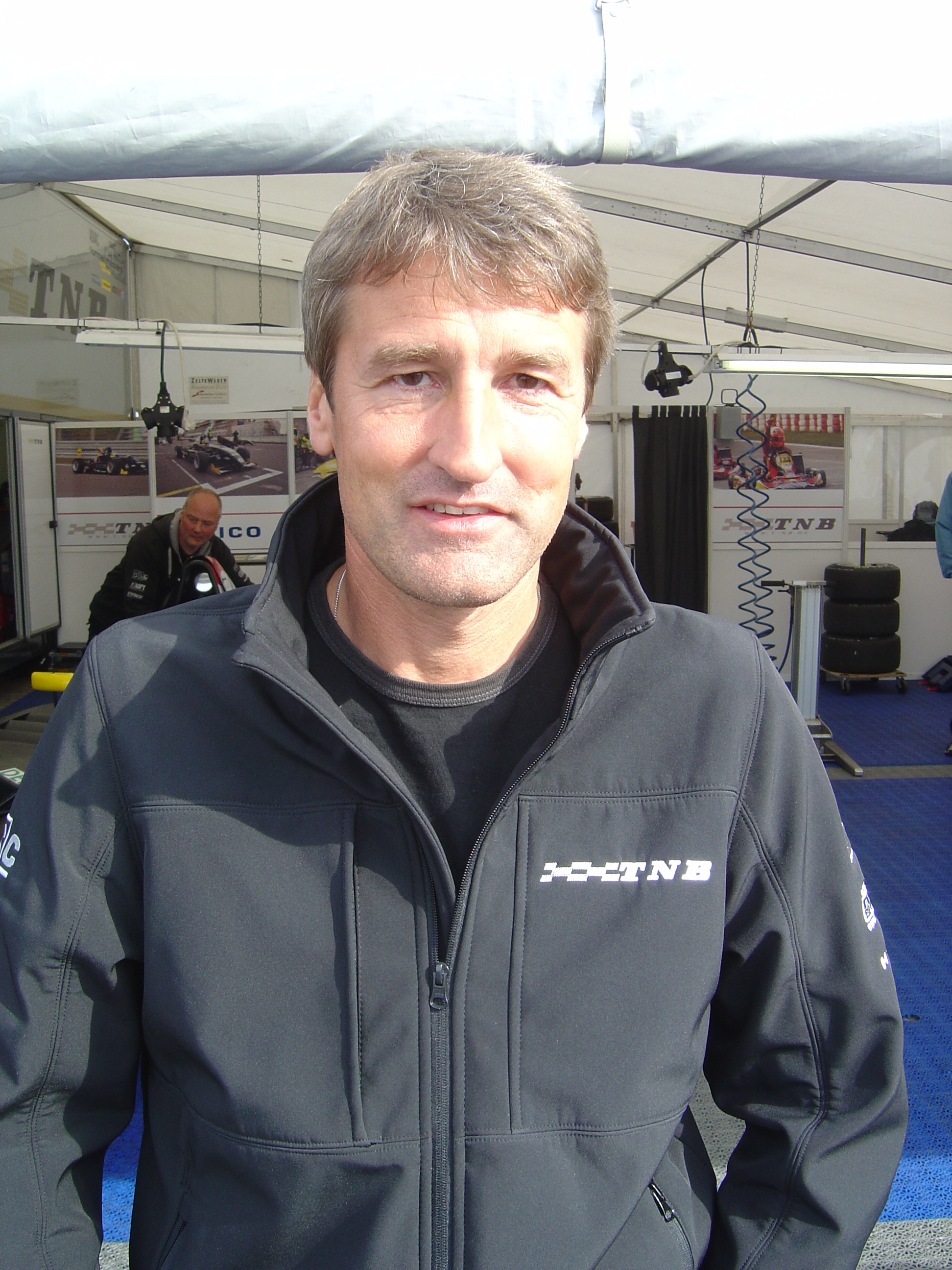
- Schneider in 2009
- Born: Bernd Robert Schneider; 20 July 1964 (age 62); St. Ingbert, West Germany

Formula One World Championship career
- Nationality: (West Germany) West German
- Active years: 1988–1990
- Team(s): Zakspeed, Arrows
- Entries: 34 (9 starts)
- Championships: 0
- Wins: 0
- Podiums: 0
- Career points: 0
- Pole positions: 0
- Fastest laps: 0
- First entry: 1988 Brazilian Grand Prix
- Last entry: 1990 Spanish Grand Prix

Deutsche Tourenwagen Masters
- Categorisation: FIA Platinum (until 2014); FIA Gold (2015–2021); FIA Silver (2022–)
- Years active: 2000–2008
- Former teams: HWA Team
- Starts: 119
- Championships: 4 (2000, 2001, 2003, 2006)
- Wins: 22
- Podiums: 66
- Poles: 19
- Fastest laps: 30

FIA GT Championship
- Years active: 1997–1998
- Former teams: AMG Mercedes
- Starts: 21
- Championships: 1 (1997)
- Wins: 10
- Podiums: 15
- Poles: 9
- Fastest laps: 8

International Touring Car Championship
- Years active: 1995–1996
- Former teams: D2 Privat-Team AMG Mercedes
- Starts: 36
- Championships: 1 (1995)
- Wins: 10
- Podiums: 17
- Poles: 8
- Fastest laps: 8

Deutsche Tourenwagen Meisterschaft
- Years active: 1986–1989, 1991–1995
- Former teams: AMG-Mercedes; AMG Motorenbau; Zakspeed Racing; Ford Motorsport Eggenberger; Ford-Grab Motorsport
- Starts: 102
- Championships: 1 (1995)
- Wins: 14
- Podiums: 29
- Poles: 13
- Fastest laps: 24

24 Hours of Le Mans career
- Years: 1991, 1998–1999
- Teams: AMG-Mercedes; Joest Porsche Racing
- Best finish: DNF (1991, 1998, 1999)
- Class wins: 0

Bernd Robert Schneider (born 20 July 1964) is a German racing driver. He is a five-time Deutsche Tourenwagen Masters champion, FIA GT champion and Mercedes brand ambassador. He also competed in Formula One.

== Career ==
=== Early years ===
Schneider was named after legendary driver Bernd Rosemeyer, winner of the 1936 European Drivers' Championship. Introduced to karting at an early age, he displayed an obvious talent for racing. After several years in the junior kart series, Schneider won the 1980 German Kart championship. Two years later, he would win the 1982 European Kart championship with the national team. In 1983, he won the African kart championship.

=== Single seater racing ===
The next few years, Schneider would race in the various Formula Ford series in Germany and elsewhere in Europe. In 1986, he joined the German Formula Three circuit, winning the title the following year in 1987 as well as finishing third in the 1987 Macau Grand Prix. This brought him to the attention of Erich Zakowski, who signed Schneider to drive for his Formula One team Zakspeed in 1988 and 1989. However, the small German-based squad did little to make an impression on the F1 circuit and Schneider was only able to qualify for nine races out of the 32 he entered with the team (seven out of 16 with the turbo powered car in 1988 and only twice out of 16 attempts did he pre-qualify and actually qualify for a race in 1989). Schneider also briefly drove for Arrows, before leaving single seaters and racing Porsche sports cars in the early 1990s for Kremer Racing and Joest Racing, in the World Sportscar Championship and the Interserie and races such as the 24 Hours of Le Mans.

Schneider won the Porsche Cup, an annual award presented by Porsche AG to recognize the world's most successful privateer racing driver competing with Porsche machinery in a customer racing team, in 1990.

=== DTM championships ===
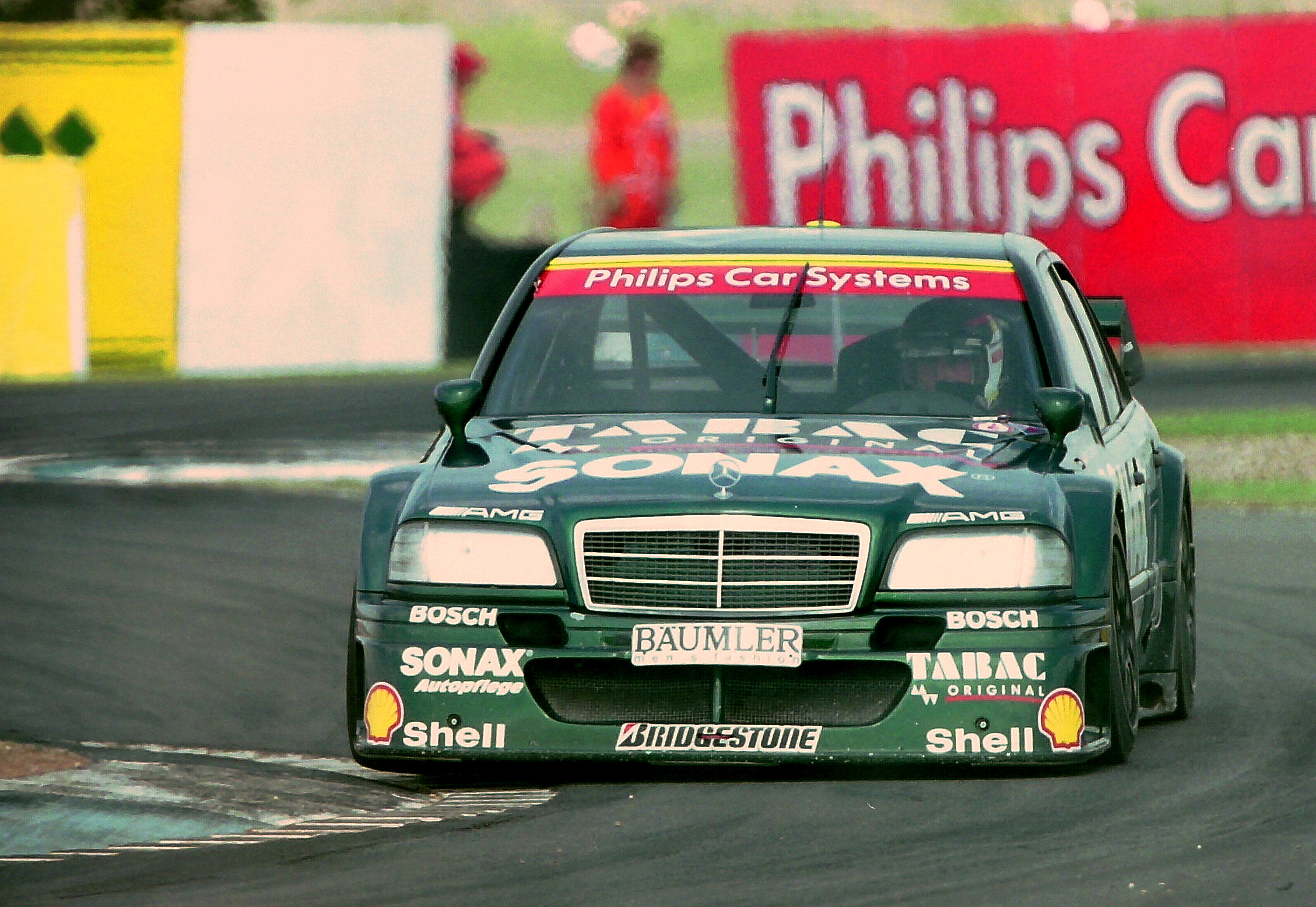
Bernd Schneider - AMG-Mercedes Tabac Original Sonax Team - AMG-Mercedes C- Klasse, 1994 DTM Donington Park.

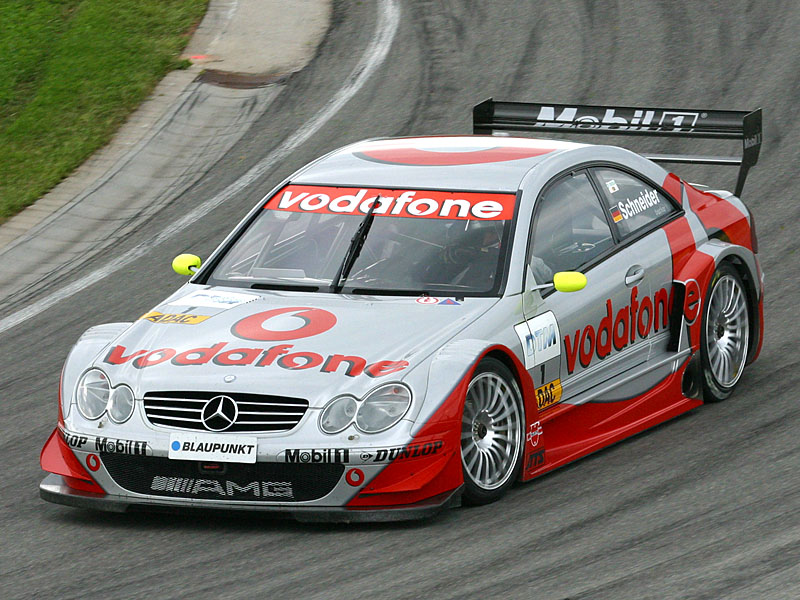
Bernd Schneider at the Sachsenring in 2002.

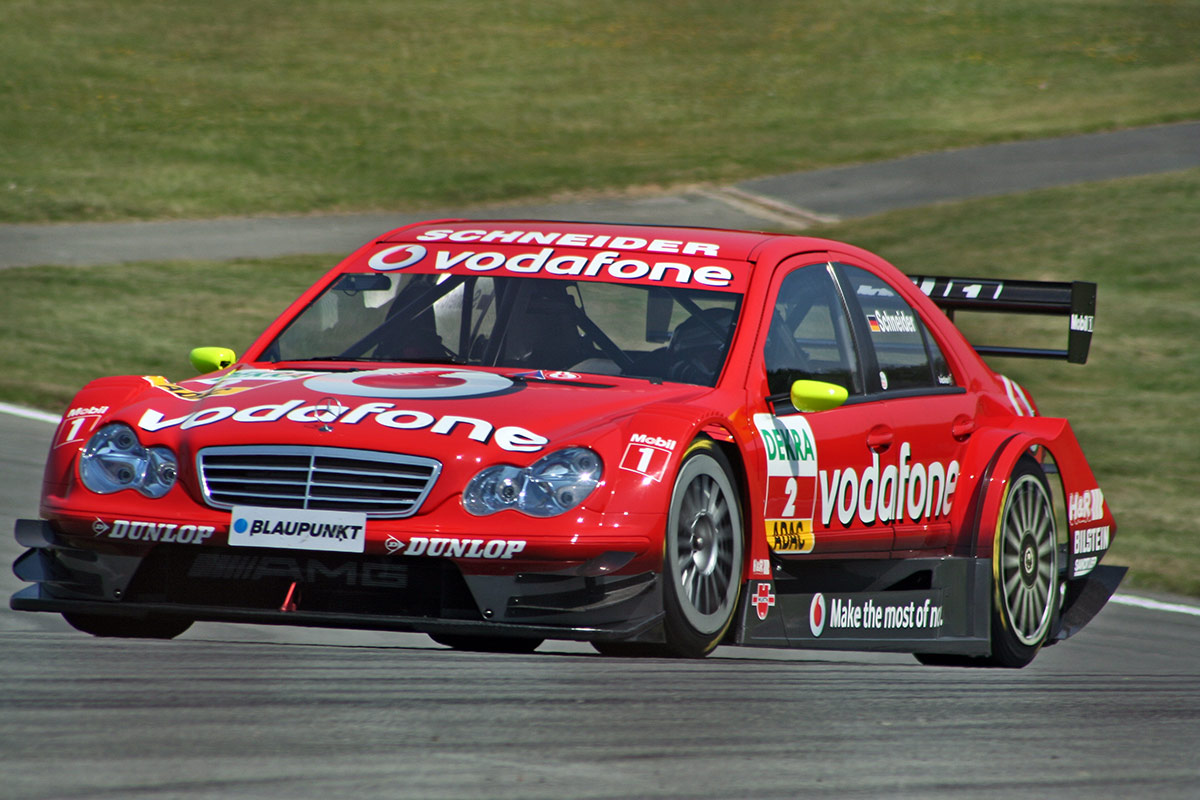
Schneider won his fifth DTM championship in 2006.

In 1992, Schneider moved to the DTM (German Touring Car Championship), driving for AMG-Mercedes. Finishing third his first season, he has since been a regular Mercedes driver. In 1995, he won his first DTM championship, piloting an AMG C-Class.

In the years of the DTM's absence, Schneider raced the works Mercedes CLK GTR cars in the FIA GT Championship, winning the title in 1997 after winning six races. In 1998, now with the CLK-LM variant, although winning five races with teammate Mark Webber, he lost the title to teammates Klaus Ludwig and Ricardo Zonta. He was also a Mercedes works driver in the 24 Hours of Le Mans in 1998 and 1999.

The DTM returned in 2000 with silhouette bodies and V8 engines, and Schneider took the championship crown three of the first four years (2000, 2001, and 2003) in an AMG CLK-Class; he was runner up in 2002. Still driving for AMG, Schneider has won a record four championships; in 2005, he was teammates with (among others) former F1 champion Mika Häkkinen, and in 2006 won his fifth championship title.

On 21 October 2008, it was announced that Schneider would retire from racing at the conclusion of the 2008 season.

=== Post-DTM ===
In recent years, Schneider has returned from retirement to take part in several endurance races. In 2013, he raced in and won the 24 Hours of Dubai, the Bathurst 12 Hour, the 24 Hours Nürburgring and the Spa 24 Hours in a Mercedes-Benz SLS AMG.

Schneider currently races in the Pro-Am class of the Blancpain Sprint Series in the No. 70 GT Russian Team Viatti Mercedes.

== Personal life ==
Schneider lives in Monte Carlo with his girlfriend Svenja and their daughter Lilly-Sophie. He also has children Lisa-Marie and Luca Maximilian with his ex-wife Nicole, Oliver Bierhoff's older sister. Schneider still enjoys karting.

== Racing record ==
=== Career summary ===
Season	Series	Team	Races	Wins	Poles	F/Laps	Podiums	Points	Position
1984	German Formula Ford 1600		?	?	?	?	?	305	**2nd**
1984	German Formula Ford 2000		?	?	?	?	?	0	NC
1985	German Formula Ford 2000		2	?	?	?	?	269	4th
1985	European Formula Ford 2000		?	?	?	?	?	0	NC
1986	German Formula 3 Championship	Bernd Schneider	11	1	1	2	4	94	4th
1986	Deutsche Tourenwagen Meisterschaft	Ford-Grab Motorsport GmbH	2	0	0	0	0	13	27th
1986	Macau Grand Prix	VIT Formula Racing	1	0	0	0	0	N/A	19th
1987	German Formula 3 Championship	Team Sonax Autopflege	8	7	8	7	7	140	**1st**
1987	Deutsche Tourenwagen Meisterschaft	Ford-Grab Motorsport GmbH	7	0	0	1	1	56	13th
1987	Macau Grand Prix	Schubel Rennsport Int.	1	0	0	1	1	N/A	**3rd**
1987	World Touring Car Championship	Ford Texaco Racing Team / Rousesport	1	0	0	0	0	16	43rd
1988	Formula One	West Zakspeed Racing	6	0	0	0	0	0	NC
1988	European Touring Car Championship	Eggenberger Motorsport	2	0	0	0	0	70	32bd
1988	Deutsche Tourenwagen Meisterschaft	Ford-Grab Motorsport GmbH	2	0	0	0	0	9	38th
1989	Formula One	West Zakspeed Racing	2	0	0	0	0	0	NC
1989	Deutsche Tourenwagen Meisterschaft	Ford Motorsport Eggenberger	2	0	0	0	0	1	49th
1990	Interserie - Div. I	Porsche Kremer Racing	10	9	5	10	9	97.5	**1st**
1990	World Sportscar Championship	Porsche Kremer Racing	8	0	0	0	0	3.5	18th
1990	Formula One	Footwork Arrows Racing	1	0	0	0	0	0	NC
1990	Porsche Carrera Cup Germany	Porsche AG	1	0	0	0	0	0	NC
1991	Interserie - Div. I	Joest Racing	6	6	6	?	?	?	**1st**
1991	IMSA GT Championship	Joest Racing	9	0	0	0	1	49	9th
1991	Deutsche Tourenwagen Meisterschaft	Zakspeed Racing	6	0	0	1	1	26	15th
1991	World Sportscar Championship	Team Salamin Primagaz	2	0	0	0	1	12	17th
1991	24 Hours of Le Mans	Joest Porsche Racing	1	0	0	0	1	12	17th
1992	Deutsche Tourenwagen Meisterschaft	AMG Motorenbau GmbH	24	4	1	7	8	191	**3rd**
1992	IMSA GT Championship	Joest Racing	3	0	0	0	0	0	NC
1993	Deutsche Tourenwagen Meisterschaft	AMG-Mercedes Sonax	22	3	2	4	9	172	**3rd**
1994	Deutsche Tourenwagen Meisterschaft	AMG Mercedes Tabac-Original Sonax	20	2	3	7	7	86	10th
1995	Deutsche Tourenwagen Meisterschaft	D2 Privat-Team AMG Mercedes	14	5	2	4	6	138	**1st**
1995	International Touring Car Championship	D2 Privat-Team AMG Mercedes	10	6	2	5	8	155	**1st**
1996	International Touring Car Championship	D2 Privat-Team AMG Mercedes	26	4	1	3	9	205	**2nd**
1997	FIA GT Championship	AMG-Mercedes	11	6	5	6	8	72	**1st**
1998	FIA GT Championship	AMG-Mercedes	10	5	4	5	8	69	**2nd**
1998	24 Hours of Le Mans	AMG-Mercedes	1	0	1	0	0	N/A	DNF
1999	24 Hours of Le Mans	AMG-Mercedes	1	0	0	0	0	N/A	DNF
2000	Deutsche Tourenwagen Masters	HWA Team	16	6	4	9	12	221	**1st**
2001	Deutsche Tourenwagen Masters	HWA Team	10	3	3	5	9	161	**1st**
2002	Deutsche Tourenwagen Masters	HWA Team	10	2	0	1	8	64	**2nd**
2003	Deutsche Tourenwagen Masters	HWA Team	10	2	4	6	7	68	**1st**
2004	Deutsche Tourenwagen Masters	HWA Team	11	1	0	5	5	36	6th
2005	Deutsche Tourenwagen Masters	HWA Team	11	1	1	0	3	32	4th
2005	24 Hours of Nürburgring - A6	Raeder Motorsport	1	0	?	?	0	N/A	?
2006	Deutsche Tourenwagen Masters	HWA Team	10	2	0	2	7	71	**1st**
2006	24 Hours of Nürburgring	Raeder Motorsport SP6 Mitsubishi Lancer Evo VIII	1	0	?	?	0	N/A	6th
2007	Deutsche Tourenwagen Masters	HWA Team	10	1	0	0	2	31.5	6th
2008	Deutsche Tourenwagen Masters	HWA Team	11	1	1	0	2	34	6th
2008	24 Hours of Nürburgring - SP3T		1	0	0	0	0	N/A	4th
2011	24 Hours of Nürburgring - SP3T		1	0	0	0	0	N/A	6th
2012	Australian GT Championship	Erebus Racing	2	2	1	2	2	42	11th
2012	Blancpain Endurance Series - Pro-Am	Preci-Spark	1	0	0	0	0	0	NC
2012	City Challenge Baku	HEICO Motorsport	1	0	0	0	0	N/A	4th
2012	24 Hours of Nürburgring	Hankook Team Heico SP9 Mercedes-Benz SLS AMG GT3	1	0	0	0	0	N/A	?
2013	Australian GT Championship	Erebus Motorsport	2	0	0	0	1	19	30th
2013	Blancpain Endurance Series - Pro	HTP Motorsport	2	2	0	1	2	71	**2nd**
2013	24 Hours of Nürburgring - SP9	Black Falcon	1	1	0	0	1	N/A	**1st**
2014	Blancpain Endurance Series - Pro	HTP Motorsport	3	0	0	2	0	30	14th
2015	ADAC GT Masters	HP Racing	8	0	1	0	0	43	21st
2015	Blancpain Endurance Series - Pro-Am	GT Russian Team	1	0	0	0	0	6	25th
2015	Blancpain Endurance Series - Pro-Am	Black Falcon	1	0	0	0	0	6	25th
2015	Blancpain GT Sprint Series	GT Russian Team	6	0	0	0	0	4	24th
2015	24H Series - A6	Abu Dhabi Racing Black Falcon							
2015	24H Series - A6	HP Racing							
2015	24 Hours of Nürburgring - SP9	Black Falcon	1	0	0	0	0	N/A	DNF
2016	Blancpain GT Series Endurance Cup	AMG - Team Black Falcon	2	0	0	0	0	0	NC
2016	24 Hours of Nürburgring - SP9	AMG - Team Black Falcon	1	1	0	0	1	N/A	**1st**
2016	Blancpain GT Series Sprint Cup	HTP Motorsport	10	1	0	2	3	59	4th
2016	Intercontinental GT Challenge	AMG - Team Black Falcon	1	0	0	0	0	6	15th
2016	Intercontinental GT Challenge	Erebus Motorsport	1	0	0	0	0	6	15th
2016	24H Series - A6	Black Falcon							
2016	24H Series - A6	HTP Motorsport							
2017	Intercontinental GT Challenge	HTP Motorsport	1	0	0	0	0	0	NC
2017	24H Series - A6	HTP Motorsport							
2017	Touring Car Endurance Series - SP3-GT4	Mercedes-AMG Testteam HTP Motorsport							
2017	24 Hours of Nürburgring - SP9	Mann-Filter Team HTP Motorsport	1	0	0	0	0	N/A	14th
2018	Blancpain GT Series Endurance Cup	SunEnergy1 Team HTP Motorsport	1	0	0	0	0	0	NC
2018	Intercontinental GT Challenge	SunEnergy1 Team HTP Motorsport	1	0	0	0	0	0	NC†
2018	IMSA SportsCar Championship - GTD	SunEnergy1 Racing	1	0	0	1	0	23	54th
2018	24H GT Series - A6	HTP Motorsport							
2018	24H GT Series - GT4	Team RACE SCOUT by Winward / HTP Motorsport							
2018	24 Hours of Nürburgring - SP8T	Mercedes-AMG Team Driving Academy	1	1	0	0	1	N/A	**1st**
2019	24H GT Series - A6	Mann-Filter Team HTP Motorsport							
2022	GT2 European Series - Invitational	SPS Automotive Performance	2	0	0	0	0	0	NC
2022	24H GT Series - GT3	MANN-FILTER Team Landgraf							

=== Complete Formula One results ===
(key)

Year	Entrant	Chassis	Engine	1	2	3	4	5	6	7	8	9	10	11	12	13	14	15	16	WDC	Points
1988	West Zakspeed Racing	Zakspeed 881	Zakspeed 1500/4 Straight-4 t/c	BRA; DNQ	SMR; DNQ	MON; DNQ	MEX; Ret	CAN; DNQ	DET; DNQ	FRA; Ret	GBR; DNQ	GER; 12	HUN; DNQ	BEL; 13	ITA; Ret	POR; DNQ	ESP; DNQ	JPN; Ret	AUS; DNQ	NC	0
1989	West Zakspeed Racing	Zakspeed 891	Yamaha OX88 V8	BRA; Ret	SMR; DNPQ	MON; DNPQ	MEX; DNPQ	USA; DNPQ	CAN; DNPQ	FRA; DNPQ	GBR; DNPQ	GER; DNPQ	HUN; DNPQ	BEL; DNPQ	ITA; DNPQ	POR; DNPQ	ESP; DNPQ	JPN; Ret	AUS; DNPQ	NC	0
1990	Footwork Arrows Racing	Arrows A11	Ford Cosworth DFR V8	USA; 12	BRA	SMR	MON	CAN	MEX	FRA	GBR	GER	HUN	BEL	ITA	POR				NC	0
1990	Footwork Arrows Racing	Arrows A11B	Ford Cosworth DFR V8														ESP; DNQ	JPN	AUS	NC	0

=== Complete World Touring Car Championship results ===
(key) (Races in bold indicate pole position) (Races in italics indicate fastest lap)

Year	Team	Car	1	2	3	4	5	6	7	8	9	10	11	DC	Points
1987	Ford Texaco Racing Team Rousesport	Ford Sierra RS500	MNZ	JAR	DIJ	NUR	SPA	BNO	SIL	BAT	CLD	WEL	FJI* ovr:17 cls:10	43rd	16

* Overall race position shown. Registered WTCC points paying position may differ.

=== Complete Deutsche Tourenwagen Meisterschaft/Masters results ===
(key) (Races in bold indicate pole position) (Races in italics indicate fastest lap)

Year	Team	Car	1	2	3	4	5	6	7	8	9	10	11	12	13	14	15	16	17	18	19	20	21	22	23	24	Pos.	Pts
1986	Ford-Grab Motorsport GmbH	Ford Sierra XR4 TI	ZOL	HOC	NÜR	AVU	MFA	WUN	NÜR	ZOL; 14	NÜR; 11																27th	13
1987	Ford-Grab Motorsport GmbH	Ford Sierra XR4 TI	HOC; 6	ZOL; 14	NÜR; 2	AVU; Ret	MFA	NOR; 22	NÜR	WUN; 9	DIE; 9	SAL															15th	56
1988	Ford-Grab Motorsport GmbH	Ford Sierra RS 500 Cosworth	ZOL; 1	ZOL; 2	HOC; 1	HOC; 2	NÜR; 1	NÜR; 2	BRN; 1	BRN; 2	AVU; 1	AVU; 2	MFA; 1	MFA; 2	NÜR; 1	NÜR; 2	NOR; 1; 22	NOR; 2; 10	WUN; 1	WUN; 2	SAL; 1	SAL; 2	HUN; 1	HUN; 2	HOC; 1	HOC; 2	38th	9
1989	Ford Motorsport Eggenberger	Ford Sierra RS 500 Cosworth	ZOL; 1	ZOL; 2	HOC; 1	HOC; 2	NÜR; 1	NÜR; 2	MFA; 1	MFA; 2	AVU; 1	AVU; 2	NÜR; 1	NÜR; 2	NOR; 1; 18	NOR; 2 Ret	HOC; 1	HOC; 2	DIE; 1	DIE; 2	NÜR; 1	NÜR; 2	HOC; 1	HOC; 2			49th	1
1991	Zakspeed Racing	Mercedes 190E 2.5-16 Evo2	ZOL; 1	ZOL; 2	HOC; 1	HOC; 2	NÜR; 1	NÜR; 2	AVU; 1	AVU; 2	WUN; 1	WUN; 2	NOR; 1	NOR; 2	DIE; 1	DIE; 2	NÜR; 1; 11	NÜR; 2; 6	ALE; 1; 23	ALE; 2; 2	HOC; 1; 10	HOC; 2; 7	BRN; 1	BRN; 2	DON; 1 Ret	DON; 2 DNS	15th	26
1992	AMG Motorenbau GmbH	Mercedes 190E 2.5-16 Evo2	ZOL; 1; 5	ZOL; 2 Ret	NÜR; 1; 10	NÜR; 2 Ret	WUN; 1; 7	WUN; 2; 4	AVU; 1; 3	AVU; 2; 1	HOC; 1; 2	HOC; 2 Ret	NÜR; 1; 4	NÜR; 2; 4	NOR; 1 Ret	NOR; 2; 4	BRN; 1; 7	BRN; 2 Ret	DIE; 1; 2	DIE; 2 Ret	**ALE**; **1**; 1	**ALE**; **2**; 1	NÜR; 1; 1	**NÜR**; **2**; 3	HOC; 1 Ret	HOC; 2 Ret	**3rd**	**191**
1993	AMG-Mercedes Sonax	Mercedes 190E 2.5-16 93	ZOL; 1 Ret		HOC; 1; 1	**HOC**; **2**; 1	**NÜR**; **1**; 2	NÜR; 2; 2	WUN; 1; 7	WUN; 2; 6	NÜR; 1; 5	NÜR; 2; 5	NOR; 1 Ret	NOR; 2 Ret	DON; 1; 4	DON; 2; 3	**DIE**; **1**; 2	DIE; 2; 6	ALE; 1; 2	ALE; 2; 1	AVU; 1; 3	AVU; 2; 23	HOC; 1 Ret	HOC; 2; 6			**3rd**	**172**
1993	AMG-Mercedes Sonax	Mercedes 190E 2.5-16 Evo2		ZOL; 2; 9																							**3rd**	**172**
1994	AMG Mercedes Tabac-Original Sonax	Mercedes C-Class V6	ZOL; 1; 19	ZOL; 2 DNS	HOC; 1 Ret	HOC; 2 Ret	**NÜR**; **1** Ret	NÜR; 2; 16	MUG; 1; 5	MUG; 2; 2	NÜR; 1; 3	NÜR; 2; 18	**NOR**; **1** Ret	DON; 1; 2	DON; 2 DSQ	NOR; 2 Ret	**DIE**; **1** Ret	DIE; 2; 1	NÜR; 1; 3	NÜR; 2; 18	AVU; 1 Ret	AVU; 2 DNS	ALE; 1; 9	ALE; 2; 5	HOC; 1; 3	HOC; 2; 1	10th	86
1995	D2 Privat-Team AMG Mercedes	Mercedes C-Class V6	HOC; 1; 1	**HOC**; **2**; 1	AVU; 1 Ret	AVU; 2; 11	**NOR**; **1**; 4	NOR; 2; 1	DIE; 1; 7	DIE; 2; 6	**NÜR**; **1**; 1	**NÜR**; **2**; 1	ALE; 1; 6	ALE; 2; 3	HOC; 1 Ret	HOC; 2; 13											**1st**	**138**
2000	HWA Team	AMG-Mercedes CLK-DTM	**HOC**; **1**; 1	**HOC**; **2**; 1	OSC; 1; 3	OSC; 2; 12	NOR; 1; 4	NOR; 2; 1	SAC; 1; 3	SAC; 2; 3	**NÜR**; **1**; 1	**NÜR**; **2**; 1	**LAU**; **1** C	LAU; 2 C	**OSC**; **1**; 2	OSC; 2; 1	NÜR; 1; 2	NÜR; 2; 4	HOC; 1; 2	HOC; 2 NC							**1st**	**221**
2001	HWA Team	AMG-Mercedes CLK-DTM	**HOC**; **QR**; 1	**HOC**; **CR**; 1	NÜR; QR; 6	NÜR; CR; 2	OSC; QR; 3	OSC; CR; 2	SAC; QR; 4	SAC; CR; 1	**NOR**; **QR**; 1	**NOR**; **CR**; 2	LAU; QR; 3	LAU; CR; 2	NÜR; QR; 4	NÜR; CR; 6	**A1R**; **QR**; 1	**A1R**; **CR**; 1	ZAN; QR; 10	ZAN; CR; 3	HOC; QR; Ret	HOC; CR; 3					**1st**	**161**
2002	HWA Team	AMG-Mercedes CLK-DTM	HOC; QR; 11	HOC; CR; 4	ZOL; QR; 6	ZOL; CR; 3	DON; QR; 8	DON; CR; 12	SAC; QR; 3	SAC; CR; 2	NOR; QR; 3	NOR; CR; 2	LAU; QR; 2	LAU; CR; 1	NÜR; QR; 3	NÜR; CR; 3	A1R; QR; 2	A1R; CR; 2	ZAN; QR; 6	ZAN; CR; 2	**HOC**; **QR**; 2	HOC; CR; 1					**2nd**	**64**
2003	HWA Team	AMG-Mercedes CLK 2003	**HOC**; 1	ADR; 5	NÜR; 4	**LAU**; 1	**NOR**; 3	**DON**; 2	NÜR; 3	A1R; 2	ZAN; 2	HOC; 6															**1st**	**68**
2004	HWA Team	AMG-Mercedes C-Klasse 2004	HOC; 17†	EST; 5	ADR; 11	LAU; 3	NOR; 3	SHA; 2^{‡}	NÜR; 3	OSC; Ret	ZAN; 5	BRN; 10	HOC; 1														6th	36
2005	HWA Team	AMG-Mercedes C-Klasse 2005	HOC; 3	LAU; 17†	SPA; 17†	BRN; Ret	OSC; 4	NOR; 10	NÜR; 5	**ZAN**; 8	LAU; Ret	IST; 3	HOC; 1														4th	32
2006	HWA Team	AMG-Mercedes C-Klasse 2006	HOC; 1	LAU; 1	OSC; 5	BRH; 3	NOR; 2	NÜR; 2	ZAN; 2	CAT; 2	BUG; 5	HOC; 4															**1st**	**71**
2007	HWA Team	AMG-Mercedes C-Klasse 2007	HOC; 7	OSC; 6	LAU; 4	BRH; 1	NOR; 2	MUG; 11	ZAN; 12	NÜR; 7	CAT; Ret	HOC; 5															6th	31.5
2008	HWA Team	AMG-Mercedes C-Klasse 2008	HOC; 8	OSC; 12	MUG; 4	LAU; 7	NOR; 6	ZAN; 9	NÜR; 1	BRH; 9	**CAT**; 3	BUG; 5	HOC; 6														6th	34

^{‡} - Shanghai was a non-championship round.

- † — Retired, but was classified as he completed 90% of the winner's race distance.

=== Complete International Touring Car Championship results ===
(key) (Races in bold indicate pole position) (Races in italics indicate fastest lap)

Year	Team	Car	1	2	3	4	5	6	7	8	9	10	11	12	13	14	15	16	17	18	19	20	21	22	23	24	25	26	Pos.	Pts
1995	D2 Privat-Team AMG Mercedes	Mercedes C-Class V6	**MUG**; **1**; 1	**MUG**; **2**; 3	HEL; 1; 5	HEL; 2 Ret	**DON**; **1**; 1	**DON**; **2**; 1	EST; 1; 1	**EST**; **2**; 2	MAG; 1; 1	**MAG**; **2**; 1																	**1st**	**155**
1996	D2 Privat-Team AMG Mercedes	Mercedes C-Class V6	HOC; 1; 4	HOC; 2; 2	NÜR; 1; 4	NÜR; 2; 6	EST; 1; 11	EST; 2; 12	HEL; 1; 16	HEL; 2 Ret	NOR; 1; 9	NOR; 2; 6	**DIE**; **1**; 1	**DIE**; **2**; 1	SIL; 1; 16	SIL; 2; 5	NÜR; 1; 2	NÜR; 2; 2	MAG; 1 Ret	MAG; 2; 8	MUG; 1; 2	MUG; 2; 1	HOC; 1; 14†	HOC; 2 Ret	INT; 1; 5	INT; 2; 14	SUZ; 1; 3	SUZ; 2; 1	**2nd**	**205**

=== Complete 24 Hours of Le Mans results ===
Year	Team	Co-Drivers	Car	Class	Laps	Pos.	Class Pos.
1991	(Germany) Joest Porsche Racing	(France) Henri Pescarolo (Germany) Louis Krages	Porsche 962C	C2	197	DNF	DNF
1998	(Germany) AMG-Mercedes	(Germany) Klaus Ludwig (Australia) Mark Webber	Mercedes-Benz CLK-LM	GT1	19	DNF	DNF
1999	(Germany) AMG-Mercedes	(France) Franck Lagorce (Portugal) Pedro Lamy	Mercedes-Benz CLR	LMGTP	76	DNF	DNF

=== Complete FIA GT Championship results ===
Year	Entrant	Class	Chassis	Engine	1	2	3	4	5	6	7	8	9	10	11	Pos.	Pts
1997	AMG Mercedes	GT1	Mercedes-Benz CLK GTR	Mercedes-Benz LS600 6.0L V12	**HOC**; Ret	**SIL**; 2	HEL; 8	**NÜR**; 1	SPA; 2	A1R; 1	SUZ; 1‡	**DON**; 1	**MUG**; Ret	SEB; 1	LAG; 1	**1st**	**72**
1998	AMG Mercedes	GT1	Mercedes-Benz CLK LM	Mercedes-Benz M120 6.0L V12	OSC; 3	SIL; 1	**HOC**; 1	**DIJ**; 9	**HUN**; 1	**SUZ**; 1	DON; 1	A1R; 2	HMS; 4	LAG; 2		**2nd**	**69**

=== Complete Blancpain GT Series Sprint Cup results ===
Year	Team	Car	Class	1	2	3	4	5	6	7	8	9	10	11	12	13	14	Pos.	Pts
2015	GT Russian Team	Mercedes-Benz SLS AMG GT3	Pro-Am	NOG; QR; 5	NOG; CR; 11	BRH; QR; 14	BRH; CR; 10	ZOL; QR; 12	ZOL; CR; 13	MOS; QR	MOS; CR	ALG; QR	ALG; CR	MIS; QR	MIS; CR	ZAN; QR	ZAN; CR	5th	92
2016	HTP Motorsport	Mercedes-AMG GT3	Pro	MIS; QR; Ret	MIS; CR; 7	BRH; QR; 1	BRH; CR; 2	NÜR; QR; 8	NÜR; CR; 3	HUN; QR; 5	HUN; CR; 5	CAT; QR; 10	CAT; CR; 31					4th	59

Sporting positions
Preceded by Kris Nissen	German Formula Three Champion; 1987	Succeeded by Joachim Winkelhock
Preceded by Klaus Ludwig	Deutsche Tourenwagen Meisterschaft; Champion; 1995	Succeeded by Bernd Schneider (2000) (Deutsche Tourenwagen Masters)
Preceded by Inaugural	International Touring Car Championship; Champion; 1995	Succeeded by Manuel Reuter
Preceded by Ray Bellm; James Weaver (BPR Global GT Series)	FIA GT Championship; Champion; 1997	Succeeded by Klaus Ludwig; Ricardo Zonta
Preceded by Bernd Schneider (1995) (Deutsche Tourenwagen Meisterschaft)	Deutsche Tourenwagen Masters; Champion; 2000-2001	Succeeded by Laurent Aïello
Preceded by Laurent Aïello	Deutsche Tourenwagen Masters; Champion; 2003	Succeeded by Mattias Ekström
Preceded by Gary Paffett	Deutsche Tourenwagen Masters; Champion; 2006	Succeeded by Mattias Ekström
Preceded by Christopher Mies; Darryl O'Young; Christer Jöns	Winner of the Bathurst 12 Hour; 2013 (with Thomas Jäger & Alexander Roloff)	Succeeded by John Bowe; Peter Edwards; Craig Lowndes; Mika Salo
