= Eric van de Poele =

Belgian racing driver (born 1961)

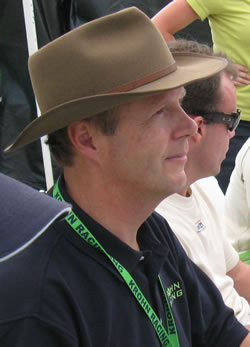
- Born: Eric Francis Edouard Ghislain Thérèse van de Poele; 30 September 1961 (age 65); Verviers, Liège, Belgium

Formula One World Championship career
- Nationality: (Belgium) Belgian
- Active years: 1991 – 1992
- Team(s): Modena, Brabham, Fondmetal
- Entries: 29 (5 starts)
- Championships: 0
- Wins: 0
- Podiums: 0
- Career points: 0
- Pole positions: 0
- Fastest laps: 0
- First entry: 1991 United States Grand Prix
- Last entry: 1992 Italian Grand Prix

24 Hours of Le Mans career
- Years: 1992, 1994, 1996 – 1998, 2000 – 2002, 2008 – 2010
- Teams: Clayton Cunninghman Racing, Racing for Belgium/Team Scandia, Nissan Motorsports/TWR, Doyle-Risi Racing, Team Cadillac, Team Bentley, Krohn Racing
- Best finish: 3rd (2001)
- Class wins: 3 (1998, 2001, 2002)

Eric Francis Edouard Ghislain Thérèse van de Poele (French pronunciation: [e.ʁik vɑn də pwal, -pwɛl]; born 30 September 1961) is a Belgian racing driver and former Formula One driver. He participated in 29 Grands Prix, in 1991 and 1992. He is a three-times class winner at 24 Hours of Le Mans, and won three Formula 3000 races in 1990. Before his Formula One career, he won the Deutsche Tourenwagen Meisterschaft.

== Driving career ==
After a difficult 1984 season in French Formula Three, van de Poele then won the Belgian and Benelux Formula Ford titles, also racing in the Belgian Touring Car Championship. He subsequently raced in German Touring Cars Championships, winning the 1987 championship despite not winning a race all season. He also won the 1987 Spa 24 Hours, sharing a car with Didier Theys and Jean-Michel Martin. He also dabbled in British Formula 3. For 1989, he moved up to Formula 3000, finishing fourth, and then runner-up in 1990.

After this, van de Poele signed for the Modena Formula One team for 1991, driving their Lamborghini cars thanks to backing from long-time sponsors LeasePlan. He qualified onto the grid at his third attempt, for the 1991 San Marino Grand Prix. There he impressed in the rain, running fifth in the last lap before the car ran out of fuel, dropping him to ninth. The team, in financial difficulties, was unable to build on this success, and van de Poele would not race again that year.

Van de Poele then signed for Brabham in 1992, but the team were low on money. He qualified for the opening South African Grand Prix, finishing 13th, but did not manage to qualify the outdated car again. He frequently matched team-mate Damon Hill in the other Brabham, however. For the Hungarian Grand Prix he switched to the promising Fondmetal team. He qualified the car at the first attempt, only to spin out. He then started an excellent 15th for the Belgian Grand Prix, finishing tenth, and qualified again for the Italian Grand Prix, only for the clutch to break. After this, Fondmetal also hit money troubles and withdrew, leaving van de Poele without a drive.

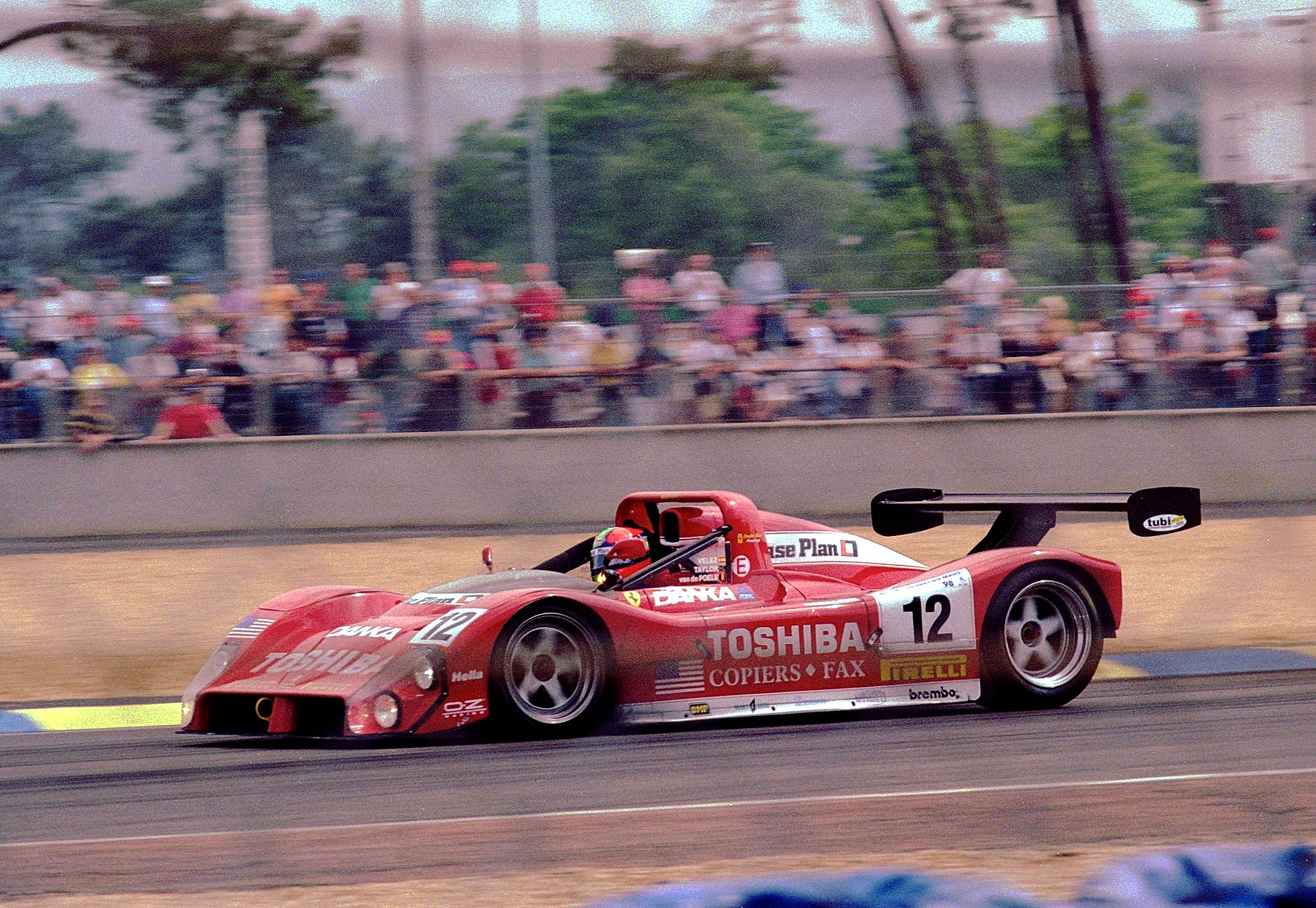
Van de Poele driving the Doyle-Risi Racing Ferrari 333 SP during the 1998 24 Hours of Le Mans endurance race.

Aside from a largely unused capacity as test driver for Tyrrell in 1993, van de Poele has since found considerable success in Touring Cars and sports cars, winning the 12 Hours of Sebring in 1995 and 1996 and the Petit Le Mans in 1998. He has also added to his 1987 win in the Spa 24 Hours with four more wins in 1998, 2005, 2006 and 2008, giving him the record of five wins in the event. In 2008, van de Poele competed in the Rolex Sports Car Series.

== Racing record ==
=== Complete German Formula Three results ===
(key) (Races in bold indicate pole position) (Races in italics indicate fastest lap)

Year	Entrant	Engine	Class	1	2	3	4	5	6	7	8	9	DC	Pts	Ref
1987	Hartge Motorsport	VW	A	NÜR; 12	AVU; DNS	ZOL; 8	HOC; 6	ÖST	SIE	NÜR; 5	NÜR; 14	ZOL; 3	11th	29	

=== Complete Deutsche Tourenwagen Meisterschaft results ===
(key) (Races in bold indicate pole position) (Races in italics indicate fastest lap)

Year	Team	Car	1	2	3	4	5	6	7	8	9	10	11	12	13	14	15	16	17	18	19	20	21	22	23	24	Pos.	Pts
1987	Zakspeed BMW Team	BMW M3	HOC; 2	**ZOL**; 10	NÜR; 4	AVU; 4	MFA; 8	NOR; 6	NÜR; 8	**WUN**; 3	DIE; 2	SAL; 10															1st	127
1988	BMW M Team Linder	BMW M3 Evo	ZOL; 1	ZOL; 2	HOC; 1	HOC; 2	NÜR; 1	NÜR; 2	BRN; 1	BRN; 2	AVU; 1	AVU; 2	MFA; 1	MFA; 2	NÜR; 1	NÜR; 2	NOR; 1	NOR; 2	WUN; 1	WUN; 2	SAL; 1	SAL; 2	HUN; 1	HUN; 2	HOC; 1; 6	HOC; 2 Ret	34th	13
1989	BMW Faltz Essen	BMW M3 Evo	ZOL; 1	ZOL; 2	HOC; 1	HOC; 2	NÜR; 1	NÜR; 2	MFA; 1	MFA; 2	AVU; 1	AVU; 2	NÜR; 1	NÜR; 2	NOR; 1; 15	NOR; 2 DNS	HOC; 1	HOC; 2	DIE; 1	DIE; 2	NÜR; 1	NÜR; 2	HOC; 1	HOC; 2			39th	4
1990	BMW M Team Schnitzer	BMW M3 Sport Evo	ZOL; 1	ZOL; 2	HOC; 1	HOC; 2	NÜR; 1	NÜR; 2	AVU; 1	AVU; 2	MFA; 1	MFA; 2	WUN; 1	WUN; 2	NÜR; 1	NÜR; 2	NOR; 1	NOR; 2	DIE; 1	DIE; 2	NÜR; 1	NÜR; 2	HOC; 1; 15	HOC; 2; 10			32nd	1

=== Complete International Formula 3000 results ===
(key) (Races in bold indicate pole position; races in italics indicate fastest lap.)

Year	Entrant	Chassis	Engine	1	2	3	4	5	6	7	8	9	10	11	Pos.	Pts
1989	Players/GA Motorsports/Colt Racing	Lola T89/50	Cosworth	SIL; 6	VAL; 3	PAU; Ret	JER; 4	PER; Ret	BRH; Ret	BIR; 14	SPA; 4	BUG; 2	DIJ; 5		5th	19
1990	GA Motorsport	Reynard 90D	Cosworth	DON; 6	SIL; 5	PAU; 1	JER; 9	MNZ; 9	PER; Ret	HOC; Ret	BRH; Ret	BIR; 1	BUG; 10	NOG; 1	**2nd**	**30**

=== Complete Formula One results ===
(key) (Races in bold indicate pole position, races in italics indicate fastest lap)

Year	Entrant	Chassis	Engine	1	2	3	4	5	6	7	8	9	10	11	12	13	14	15	16	WDC	Pts
1991	Central Park Modena Team	Lambo 291	Lamborghini 3512 3.5 V12	USA; DNPQ	BRA; DNPQ	SMR; 9†	MON; DNPQ	CAN; DNPQ	MEX; DNPQ	FRA; DNPQ	GBR; DNPQ	GER; DNQ	HUN; DNQ	BEL; DNQ	ITA; DNQ	POR; DNQ	ESP; DNQ	JPN; DNQ	AUS; DNQ	NC	0
1992	Brabham	Brabham BT60B	Judd GV 3.5 V10	RSA; 13	MEX; DNQ	BRA; DNQ	ESP; DNQ	SMR; DNQ	MON; DNQ	CAN; DNQ	FRA; DNQ	GBR; DNQ	GER; DNQ							NC	0
1992	Fondmetal	Fondmetal GR02	Ford HBA5 3.5 V8											HUN; Ret	BEL; 10	ITA; Ret	POR	JPN	AUS	NC	0

† Driver did not finish the race, but were still classified as they completed 90% of the race distance.

=== Complete British Touring Car Championship results ===
(key) (Races in bold indicate pole position) (Races in italics indicate fastest lap)

Year	Team	Car	1	2	3	4	5	6	7	8	9	10	11	12	13	14	15	16	17	18	19	20	21	Pos.	Pts
1994	Old Spice Nissan Racing	Nissan Primera eGT	THR; 1; 13	BRH; 1 DNS	BRH; 2 DNS	SNE; 1; 9	SIL; 1; 13	SIL; 2; 12	OUL; 1; 14	DON; 1; 17	DON; 2; 13	BRH; 1; 14	BRH; 2; 12	SIL; 1 DNS	KNO; 1	KNO; 2	OUL; 1	BRH; 1	BRH; 2	SIL; 1	SIL; 2	DON; 1	DON; 2	22nd	2

=== Complete Spanish Touring Car Championship results ===
(key) (Races in bold indicate pole position; races in italics indicate fastest lap.)

Year	Team	Car	1	2	3	4	5	6	7	8	9	10	11	12	13	14	15	16	17	18	19	20	DC	Pts
1995	Team Repsol Nissan	Nissan Primera	**JER**; **1**; 3	JER; 2 Ret	**JAR**; **1**; 2	JAR; 2; 8	BAR; 1; 2	BAR; 2; 1	EST; 1; 4	EST; 2; 2	ALB; 1 Ret	ALB; 2; 5	CAL; 1; 1	CAL; 2; 4	ALB; 1; 3	ALB; 2; 10	JER; 1; 4	JER; 2; 4	**BAR**; **1**; 1	BAR; 2; 1	JAR; 1 EX	JAR; 2 EX	**3rd**	**204**
1996	Team Repsol Nissan	Nissan Primera	JAR; 1; 5	JAR; 2; 1	ALB; 1; 4	ALB; 2; 2	BAR; 1; 4	BAR; 2 Ret	EST; 1; 9	EST; 2; 7	CAL; 1; 4	CAL; 2; 8	JER; 1; 3	JER; 2; 2	JAR; 1 Ret	JAR; 2; 8	BAR; 1; 7	BAR; 2; 1					5th	139

=== 24 Hours of Spa results ===
Year	Team	Co-Drivers	Car	Class	Laps	Pos.	Class Pos.
1985	(Belgium) Hoflijk Sport Team	(Belgium) Guy Hendrickx (Belgium) Freek Staal	Opel Manta GTE	Div.2		DNF	DNF
1986	(Italy) CiBiEmme Sport	(Belgium) Jean-Michel Martin (Belgium) Pascal Witmeur	BMW 635 CSi	Div.3	489	DNF	DNF
1987	(Belgium) Waterloo Motors	(Belgium) Jean-Michel Martin (Belgium) Didier Theys	BMW M3	Div.2	481	1st	1st
1988	(Germany) BMW Motorsport	(Germany) Harald Grohs (Germany) Markus Oestreich	BMW M3	Div.2	477	9th	5th
1991	(Italy) Bastos Castrol Team Bigazzi	(Italy) Emanuele Pirro (Italy) Roberto Ravaglia	BMW M3	Div.2		DNF	DNF
1992	(Italy) BMW Fina Bastos Team Bigazzi	(Germany) Altfrid Heger (Germany) Joachim Winkelhock	BMW M3	DTM	512	2nd	2nd
1993	(United Kingdom) Toyota Racing UK	(United Kingdom) Julian Bailey (United Kingdom) Will Hoy	Toyota Carina E GTi	FISA 2L	271	23rd	3rd
1995	Opel Team Belgium	(Belgium) Jean-François Hemroulle (Belgium) Pierre-Alain Thibaut	Opel Vectra	ST		DNF	DNF
1996	Opel Team Belgium	(France) Alain Cudini (Belgium) Pierre-Alain Thibaut	Opel Vectra GT	ST		DNF	DNF
1997	(Belgium) Ecurie Toison d'Or	(Belgium) Olivier Marechal (Belgium) Pascal Witmeur	BMW 318 is	ST	411	27th	3rd
1998	(Belgium) BMW Fina Bastos Team	(France) Alain Cudini (Belgium) Marc Duez	BMW 320i	SP	480	1st	1st
2000	(Belgium) Peugeot Team Belgique Luxembourg	(Belgium) Vincent Radermecker (Belgium) Jeffrey van Hooydonk	Peugeot 306 GTI	SP		DNF	DNF
2001	(Italy) Team Rafanelli	(Belgium) Martial Chouvel (Italy) Emanuele Naspetti (Belgium) Philippe Steveny	Ferrari 550 Maranello	GT	150	DNF	DNF
2002	(United Kingdom) Lister Storm Racing	(United Kingdom) Jamie Campbell-Walter (Germany) Nicolaus Springer (United Kingdom) Andy Wallace	Lister Storm GTM	GT	424	DQ	DQ
2003	(Germany) Konrad Motorsport	(Austria) Franz Konrad (Austria) Walter Lechner Jr. (Switzerland) Toni Seiler	Saleen S7-R	GT	74	DNF	DNF
2004	(Germany) Vitaphone Racing	(Germany) Uwe Alzen (Germany) Michael Bartels (Austria) Franz Konrad	Saleen S7-R	GT	78	DNF	DNF
2005	(Germany) Vitaphone Racing	(Germany) Michael Bartels (Germany) Timo Scheider	Maserati MC12 GT1	GT1	576	1st	1st
2006	(Germany) Vitaphone Racing	(Italy) Andrea Bertolini (Germany) Michael Bartels	Maserati MC12 GT1	GT1	589	1st	1st
2007	(Germany) Vitaphone Racing	(Germany) Michael Bartels (Italy) Thomas Biagi (Portugal) Pedro Lamy	Maserati MC12 GT1	GT1	532	2nd	2nd
2008	(Germany) Vitaphone Racing	(Germany) Michael Bartels (Italy) Andrea Bertolini (France) Stéphane Sarrazin	Maserati MC12 GT1	GT1	577	1st	1st
2009	(Germany) Vitaphone Racing	(Portugal) Miguel Ramos (Portugal) Pedro Lamy (Germany) Alex Müller	Maserati MC12 GT1	GT1	419	DNF	DNF
2010	(Italy) AF Corse ALD Team Vitaphone (Germany) Vitaphone Racing	(Italy) Gianmaria Bruni (Belgium) Bert Longin (Finland) Toni Vilander	Ferrari F430 GTE	GT2	295	DNF	DNF
2011	(Germany) Vita4One	(France) Jean-Karl Vernay (Belgium) Nico Verdonck	Ferrari F458 Italia GT3	GT3 Pro	251	DNF	DNF
2012	(Belgium) Boutsen Ginion Racing	(United Kingdom) Jack Clarke (Belgium) Edouard Mondron (Belgium) Nico Verdonck	McLaren MP4-12C GT3	GT3 Pro-Am	124	DNF	DNF
2015	(Belgium) BMW Racing Against Cancer	(Belgium) Marc Duez (Belgium) Jean-Michel Martin (Belgium) Pascal Witmeur	BMW Z4 GT3	Pro-Am Cup	42	DNF	DNF

=== 24 Hours of Le Mans results ===
Year	Team	Co-Drivers	Car	Class	Laps	Pos.	Class Pos.
1992	(France) Peugeot Talbot Sport	(Austria) Karl Wendlinger (France) Alain Ferté	Peugeot 905 Evo 1B	C1	208	DNF	DNF
1994	(United States) Clayton Cunningham Racing	(United States) Paul Gentilozzi (Japan) Shunji Kasuya	Nissan 300ZX Turbo	IMSA; GTS	25	DNF	DNF
1995	(France) Courage Compétition	(Monaco) Olivier Beretta (Slovenia) Matiaz Tomlje	Courage C41-Chevrolet	WSC	-	DNQ	DNQ
1996	Racing for Belgium; Team Scandia	(Belgium) Marc Goossens (Belgium) Éric Bachelart	Ferrari 333 SP	WSC	208	DNF	DNF
1997	(Japan) Nissan Motorsport (United Kingdom) TWR	(Italy) Riccardo Patrese (Japan) Aguri Suzuki	Nissan R390 GT1	GT1	121	DNF	DNF
1998	(United States) Doyle-Risi Racing	(South Africa) Wayne Taylor (Spain) Fermín Vélez	Ferrari 333 SP	LMP1	332	8th	**1st**
1999	(Japan) Nissan Motorsport	(Japan) Masami Kageyama (Japan) Aguri Suzuki	Nissan R391	LMP	-	DNS	DNS
2000	(United States) Team Cadillac	(South Africa) Wayne Taylor (Italy) Max Angelelli	Cadillac Northstar LMP	LMP900	287	22nd	12th
2001	(United Kingdom) Team Bentley	(United Kingdom) Andy Wallace (United States) Butch Leitzinger	Bentley EXP Speed 8	LMGTP	306	**3rd**	**1st**
2002	(United Kingdom) Team Bentley	(United Kingdom) Andy Wallace (United States) Butch Leitzinger	Bentley EXP Speed 8	LMGTP	362	4th	**1st**
2008	(United States) Risi Competizione (United States) Krohn Racing	(United States) Tracy Krohn (Sweden) Niclas Jönsson	Ferrari F430 GT2	GT2	12	DNF	DNF
2009	(United States) Risi Competizione (United States) Krohn Racing	(United States) Tracy Krohn (Sweden) Niclas Jönsson	Ferrari F430 GT2	GT2	323	22nd	**3rd**
2010	(United States) Risi Competizione (United States) Krohn Racing	(United States) Tracy Krohn (Sweden) Niclas Jönsson	Ferrari F430 GT2	GT2	197	DNF	DNF

=== 24 Hours of Nürburgring results ===
Year	Team	Co-Drivers	Car	Class	Laps	Pos.	Class Pos.
1987	(Germany) Zakspeed BMW-Team	(Germany) Marc Hessel (Germany) Karl Senne	BMW M3	8	119	19th	5th
1988	(Germany) BMW Motorsport GmbH	(Belgium) Marc Duez (Belgium) Eddy Joosen	BMW M3	9	40	DNF	DNF
1989	(Belgium) BMW Fina	(Belgium) Marc Duez (Belgium) Jean-Michel Martin	BMW M3	2	70	DNF	DNF
2006	(Italy) Maserati SPA	(Italy) Andrea Bertolini (Germany) Michael Bartels (Italy) Gianni Giudici	Maserati Gransport Light GT3	E1XP	26	DNF	DNF

=== 24 Hours of Zolder results ===
Year	Team	Co-Drivers	Car	Class	Laps	Pos.	Class Pos.
2007	(Belgium) Gravity International Racing	(France) Christophe Bouchut (Belgium) Stéphane Lémeret (Belgium) Vincent Radermecker	Mosler MT900 R GT3	1		DNF	DNF

=== Complete Grand Prix Masters results ===
(key) Races in bold indicate pole position, races in italics indicate fastest lap.

Year	Team	Chassis	Engine	1	2	3	4	5
2006	Team Golden Palace	Delta Motorsport GPM	Nicholson McLaren 3.5 V8	QAT; 3	ITA; C	GBR; 2	MAL; C	RSA; C

Sporting positions
Preceded by Kurt Thiim	German Touring Car Champion; 1987	Succeeded by Klaus Ludwig
