= 1984 Deutschen Produktionswagen Meisterschaft =

German production car championship season

The 1984 Deutsche Produktionswagen Meisterschaft was the inaugural season of premier German touring car racing, which would later become the Deutsche Tourenwagen Meisterschaft and the Deutsche Tourenwagen Masters.

The championship was run under modified Group A regulations, which was won by Volker Strycek driving a BMW 635CSi. Strycek won the championship despite not winning a single race.

== Calendar ==
Race	Circuit	Event	Dates
1	(Belgium) Circuit Zolder, Heusden-Zolder	Bergischer Löwe	10–11 March
2	(Germany) Hockenheimring, Hockenheim	XVIII Deutschland Trophäe (XV Jim Clark Gedächtnisrennen)	8 April
3	(Germany) AVUS, Berlin	ADAC AVUS Rennen	13 May
4	(Germany) AVUS, Berlin	ADAC AVUS Rennen	13 May
5	(Germany) Flugplatz Mainz Finthen, Mainz	AvD/HMSC Flugplatzrennen Mainz-Finthen	26–27 May
6	(Germany) Wunstorf Airfield Circuit, Lower Saxony	ADAC-Flugplatzrennen Wunstorf	9–11 June
7	(Germany) Nürburgring, Nürburg	XIX. ADAC 300 km Rennen	15–17 June
8	(Germany) Nürburgring, Nürburg	XIX. ADAC 300 km Rennen	15–17 June
9	(Germany) Norisring, Nuremberg (Nürnberg)	200 Meilen von Nürnberg	1 July
10	(Germany) Nürburgring, Nürburg	Grosser Preis der Tourenwagen	6–8 July
11	(Germany) Diepholz Airfield Circuit, Diepholz	Internationales ADAC-Flugplatzrennen Diepholz	21–22 July
12	(Germany) Hockenheimring, Hockenheim	XLII Großer Preis von Deutschland	3–4 August
13	(Germany) Hockenheimring, Hockenheim	XLII Großer Preis von Deutschland	3–4 August
14	(Belgium) Circuit Zolder, Heusden-Zolder	18. ADAC Westfalen-Pokal-Rennen	18–19 August
15	(Germany) Nürburgring, Nürburg	ADAC-Bilstein Super-Sprint Nürburgring	22–23 September
