= 1985 Deutschen Produktionswagen Meisterschaft =

German production car championship season

1985 Deutsche Tourenwagen Meisterschaft

Seasons
- ← 1984 1986 →

The 1985 Deutsche Produktionswagen Meisterschaft was the second season of premier German touring car championship and also last season before the championship was renamed to the Deutsche Tourenwagen Meisterschaft.

The championship was run under modified Group A regulations, which was won by Per Stureson driving a Volvo 240 Turbo.
