= Deutsche Tourenwagen Meisterschaft =

Defunct German car racing series (1984–1996)

- Category: Touring cars
- Country: Germany
- Inaugural season: 1984
- Folded: 1996
- Constructors: Mercedes-Benz; Audi; Opel; Alfa Romeo; BMW
- Tyre suppliers: Michelin, Dunlop, Bridgestone
- Last Drivers' champion: (Germany) Manuel Reuter
- Last Teams' champion: (Germany) Opel
- Official website: www.dtm.de

The Deutsche Tourenwagen Meisterschaft (DTM) was a touring car racing series held from 1984 to 1996. Originally based in Germany, it held additional rounds elsewhere in Europe and later worldwide.

The original DTM had resumed racing with production based cars, as the former Deutsche Rennsport Meisterschaft had switched to Group 5 in 1977 and even to expensive Group C sportscars in 1982, leading to its decline. Since 2000, a new DTM has been run as the Deutsche Tourenwagen Masters, again organised by ITR and former Formula 1 driver Gerhard Berger.

== History ==
=== Rise of the original DTM ===
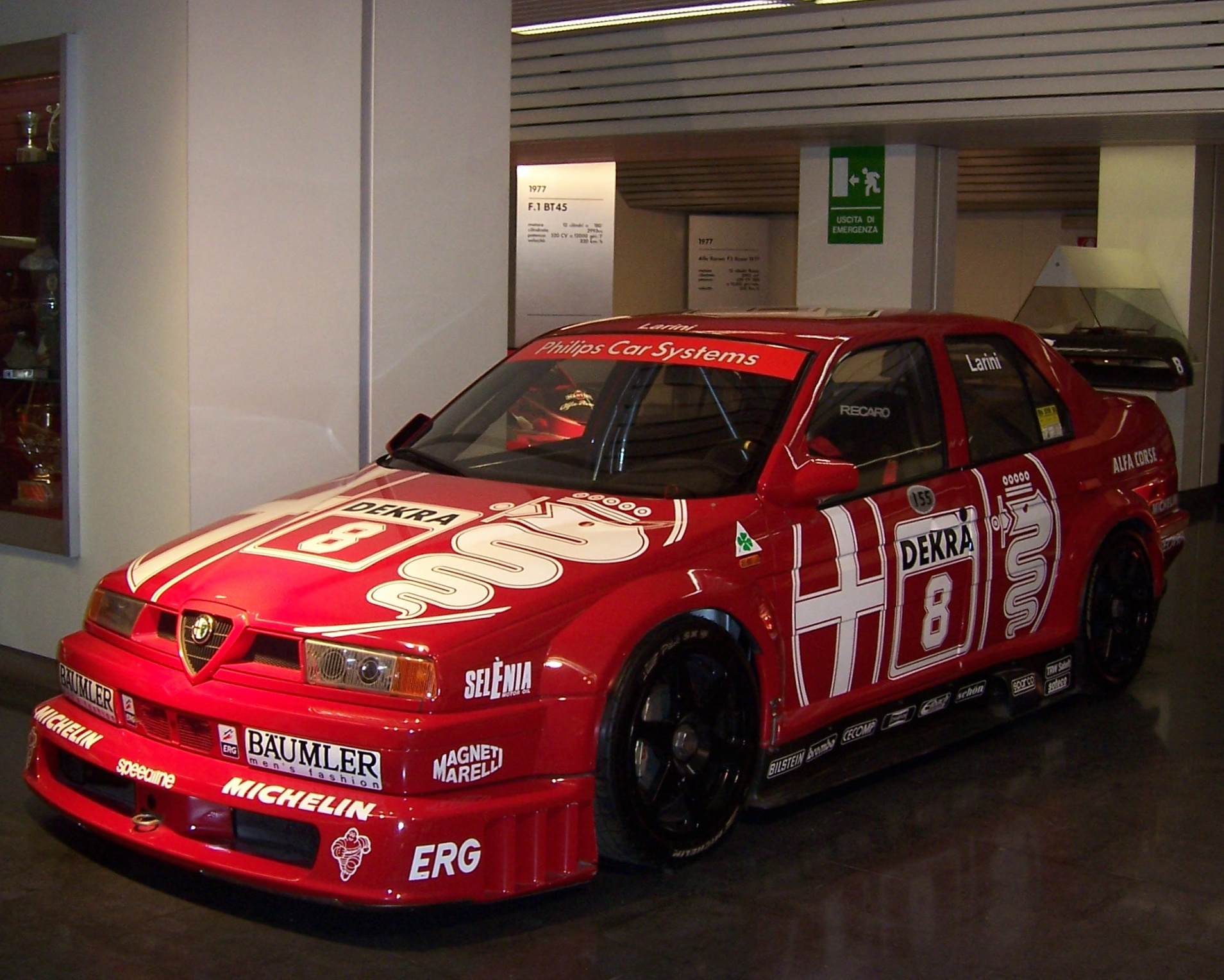
The Alfa Romeo 155 V6 TI DTM of 1993 champion Nicola Larini. The 155 holds the all-time record of 38 victories in DTM

The original DTM was started in 1984 as Deutschen Produktionswagen Meisterschaft (German Production Car Championship), with cars entered by privateer teams and under FIA Group A rules, but was extensively modified throughout the years, allowing more modifications. In the late 1980s, works teams joined the DTM, and it became one of the most popular motorsport championships in Europe.

Turbochargers were banned at the start of 1990 season due to costs.

In 1993, the Group A rules were abandoned in favor of a more liberalised 2.5 L engine category called FIA Class 1 Touring Cars, with extensive use of ABS, four-wheel drive, electronic driver aids and carbon fibre chassis, the former three were technologies that were banned from F1. Opel, Mercedes-Benz and Alfa Romeo all fielded works teams after Audi and BMW had abandoned earlier.

=== DTM to ITC and demise ===
The DTM expanded its horizons for the 1995 season and the teams contested the inaugural FIA International Touring Car Series as well as the traditional DTM. The former was contested over ten races, all held outside of Germany and the latter over fourteen races within Germany. Plans were then made to combine the two into one new series, the International Touring Car Championship, for 1996. The ITR governing body then sought approval and support from the FIA to begin the new series. In exchange for FIA support, the ITR let the organisation take control over many aspects of the way the ITC was run: crucially, the financial side of the championship was revolutionised. A large proportion of the revenue generated by the championship went to the FIA, with the result that less went to the teams who subsequently complained of little return on their increasingly large investment in the high-tech series (this was further exacerbated by the travel costs to the new international rounds in Suzuka, Japan and Interlagos, Brazil). The FIA also increased the price for television rights dramatically with the result that television coverage of the series disappeared from all European countries except Italy, Germany and Finland, prices for tickets to races were almost doubled, and access to the circuit paddock to meet the drivers (which had previously been a big hit with fans) was drastically reduced. The choices of circuits on which to hold rounds of the championship were also unsuccessful – the rounds at Magny-Cours, France and particularly Interlagos suffered very poor attendance. Opel and Alfa Romeo both left the championship after the 1996 season, leaving only Mercedes; the championship was consequently cancelled.

=== The new DTM ===
The DTM returned in 2000 with different rules including low-cost control method and with semi-International Championship status. The DTM initials stands for Deutsche Tourenwagen Masters.

== Champions ==
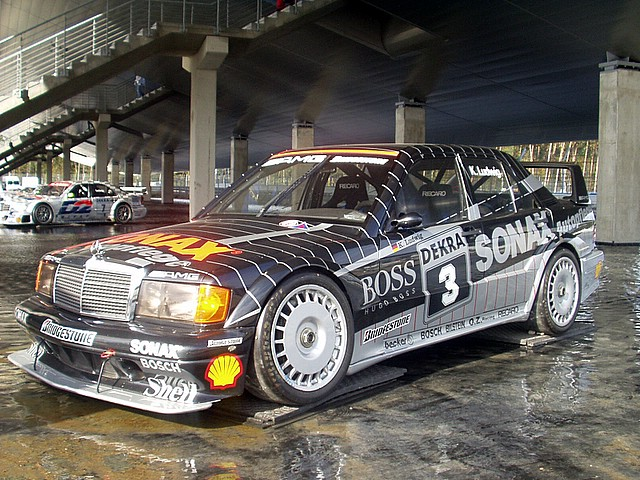
Klaus Ludwig won the 1992 drivers' title with a Mercedes-Benz 190E

Season	Series Name	Champion / Car	Second	Third	Manufacturers Champion
1984	Deutschen Produktionswagen Meisterschaft	(Germany) Volker Strycek (BMW 635CSi)	(Germany) Olaf Manthey	(Germany) Harald Grohs	not awarded
1985	Deutschen Produktionswagen Meisterschaft	(Sweden) Per Stureson (Volvo 240 Turbo)	(Germany) Olaf Manthey	(Germany) Harald Grohs	not awarded
1986	Deutsche Tourenwagen Meisterschaft	(Denmark) Kurt Thiim (Rover Vitesse)	(Germany) Volker Weidler	(Germany) Kurt König	not awarded
1987	Deutsche Tourenwagen Meisterschaft	(Belgium) Eric van de Poele (BMW M3)	(Germany) Manuel Reuter	(Germany) Marc Hessel	not awarded
1988	Deutsche Tourenwagen Meisterschaft	(Germany) Klaus Ludwig (Ford Sierra RS500)	(Germany) Roland Asch	(Germany) Armin Hahne	not awarded
1989	Deutsche Tourenwagen Meisterschaft	(Italy) Roberto Ravaglia (BMW M3)	(Germany) Klaus Niedzwiedz	(France) Fabien Giroix	not awarded
1990	Deutsche Tourenwagen Meisterschaft	(Germany) Hans-Joachim Stuck (Audi V8 Quattro)	(Venezuela) Johnny Cecotto	(Denmark) Kurt Thiim	not awarded
1991	Deutsche Tourenwagen Meisterschaft	(Germany) Frank Biela (Audi V8 Quattro)	(Germany) Klaus Ludwig	(Germany) Hans-Joachim Stuck	(Germany) Mercedes-Benz
1992	Deutsche Tourenwagen Meisterschaft	(Germany) Klaus Ludwig (Mercedes-Benz 190E Evo 2)	(Denmark) Kurt Thiim	(Germany) Bernd Schneider	(Germany) Mercedes-Benz
1993	Deutsche Tourenwagen Meisterschaft	(Italy) Nicola Larini (Alfa Romeo 155 V6 Ti)	(Germany) Roland Asch	(Germany) Bernd Schneider	(Italy) Alfa Romeo
1994	Deutsche Tourenwagen Meisterschaft	(Germany) Klaus Ludwig (Mercedes-Benz C Class)	(Germany) Jörg van Ommen	(Italy) Nicola Larini	(Germany) Mercedes-Benz
1995	Deutsche Tourenwagen Meisterschaft	(Germany) Bernd Schneider (Mercedes C-Class V6)	(Germany) Jörg van Ommen	(Germany) Klaus Ludwig	(Germany) Mercedes-Benz
1995	International Touring Car Series	(Germany) Bernd Schneider (Mercedes C-Class V6)	(Denmark) Jan Magnussen	(United Kingdom) Dario Franchitti	(Germany) Mercedes-Benz
1996	International Touring Car Championship	(Germany) Manuel Reuter (Opel Calibra V6 4x4)	(Germany) Bernd Schneider	(Italy) Alessandro Nannini	(Germany) Opel
1997– 1999	DTM / ITC	not held			
2000– present	Deutsche Tourenwagen Masters	See Deutsche Tourenwagen Masters			

- In 1995 there were two different series with same drivers and teams competing. DTM consisted of seven German (2x Hockenheim, Avus, Norisring, Diepholz, Nürburgring and Singen) events and ITC five non-German (Mugello, Helsinki, Donington, Estoril, Magny-Cours) events.

== See also ==
- Deutsche Tourenwagen Masters
- V8Star Series
