= 1986 Deutsche Tourenwagen Meisterschaft =

German touring car championship season

Seasons
- ← 1985 1987 →

The 1986 Deutsche Tourenwagen Meisterschaft was the third season of premier German touring car championship and also first season under the moniker of Deutsche Tourenwagen Meisterschaft.

The championship was run under modified Group A regulations, which was won by Kurt Thiim driving a Rover Vitesse.

== Schedule and results ==
Round	Country	Circuit	Date	Pole position	Fastest lap	Winning driver	Winning team	Report
1	Belgium	Zolder	30 March	(Germany) Harald Grohs	(Denmark) Kurt Thiim	(Denmark) Kurt Thiim	ATN Autotechnik Nickel	Report
2	Germany	Hockenheimring	13 April	(Denmark) Kurt Thiim	(Sweden) Per-Gunnar Andersson	(Sweden) Per-Gunnar Andersson	Team Beckers	Report
3	Germany	Nürburgring	27 April	(Germany) Manuel Reuter	(Denmark) Kurt Thiim	(Germany) Volker Weidler	RSM Marko	Report
4	Germany	AVUS	11 May	(Germany) Klaus Niedzwiedz	(Germany) Roland Asch	(Germany) Volker Weidler	RSM Marko	Report
5	Germany	Mainz-Finthen	1 June	(Austria) Franz Klammer	(Germany) Klaus Niedzwiedz	(Germany) Klaus Niedzwiedz	Ford Rennsport HWRT	Report
6	Germany	Wunstorf	8 June	(Germany) Klaus Niedzwiedz	(Germany) Volker Weidler	(Denmark) Kurt Thiim	ATN Autotechnik Nickel	Report
7	Germany	Nürburgring	13 July	(Germany) Klaus Niedzwiedz	(Germany) Volker Weidler	(Denmark) Kurt Thiim	ATN Autotechnik Nickel	Report
8	Belgium	Zolder	17 August	(Germany) Jörg van Ommen	(Germany) Kurt König	(Germany) Kurt König		Report
9	Germany	Nürburgring	21 September	(Germany) Klaus Niedzwiedz	(Germany) Manuel Reuter	(Germany) Manuel Reuter	Ringshausen ABR Motorsport	Report

== Championship standings ==
=== Scoring system ===
Points were awarded to the top eighteen classified finishers. Only the best eight round results were retained.

Position	**1st**	**2nd**	**3rd**	**4th**	**5th**	**6th**	**7th**	**8th**	**9th**	**10th**	**11th**	**12th**	**13th**	**14th**	**15th**	**16th**	**17th**	**18th**
Points	20	18	16	15	14	13	12	11	10	9	8	7	6	5	4	3	2	1

=== Drivers' standings ===
Pos	Driver	ZOL1 (Belgium)	HOC (Germany)	NÜR1 (Germany)	AVU (Germany)	MAI (Germany)	WUN (Germany)	NÜR2 (Germany)	ZOL2 (Belgium)	NÜR3 (Germany)	Punkte
1	(Denmark) Kurt Thiim	1	**Ret**	2	4	3	1	1	13	4	130
2	(Germany) Volker Weidler			1	1	4	2	2	15	2	113
3	(Germany) Kurt König	4	4	24	6	8	13	5	1	9	104
4	(Sweden) Per Stureson	3	2	9	7	11	7	11	2	(13)	102
5	(Germany) Volker Strycek	12	(13)	8	9	6	9	6	5	8	89
6	(Germany) Klaus Niedzwiedz	6	3	4	**Ret**	1	**Ret**	**10**	9	**Ret**	83
7	(Germany) Anton Goeser	20	11	7	Ret	2	8	3	8	Ret	76
8	(Sweden) Per-Gunnar Andersson	2	1	5	DSQ	Ret	5	Ret		10	75
9	(Germany) Manuel Reuter	Ret	12	**Ret**	Ret	7	4		4	1	69
10	(Germany) Fritz Müller	Ret	6	6	8	Ret	10	7		19	58
11	(Germany) Beate Nodes	18	9	11	3	14	11	Ret	18	12	56
12	(Austria) Franz Klammer	10	Ret	DNS	Ret	**5**	3	19	16	7	54
13	(Germany) Johannes Breuer	11	7	22	2	12	14				50
14	(Germany) Walter Prüser	16	15	12	11	15	(18)	12	11	16	45
15	(Germany) Walter Mertes	9	Ret	Ret	Ret	10	17	13	3	Ret	43
15	(Germany) Olaf Manthey	8	Ret	3	5	Ret			17		43

Colour	Result
Gold	Winner
Silver	Second place
Bronze	Third place
Green	Points classification
Blue	Non-points classification
Blue	Non-classified finish (NC)
Purple	Retired, not classified (Ret)
Red	Did not qualify (DNQ)
Red	Did not pre-qualify (DNPQ)
Black	Disqualified (DSQ)
White	Did not start (DNS)
White	Withdrew (WD)
White	Race cancelled (C)
Blank	Did not practice (DNP)
Blank	Did not arrive (DNA)
Blank	Excluded (EX)

**Bold** – Pole
Italics – Fastest Lap
