= 1987 Deutsche Tourenwagen Meisterschaft =

German touring car championship season

Seasons
- ← 1986 1988 →

The 1987 Deutsche Tourenwagen Meisterschaft was the fourth season of premier German touring car championship and also second season under the moniker of Deutsche Tourenwagen Meisterschaft.

The championship was run under modified Group A regulations, which was won by Eric van de Poele driving a BMW M3.
