= Per Stureson =

Per Göran Stureson (born 22 March 1948) is a Swedish racecar driver. He was 1985 DTM champion.

== Career ==
From 1984 to 1988, Stureson participated in 55 DTM races. He won his first DTM race, driving a Volvo 240 Turbo. He won the 1985 Deutsche Produktionswagen Meisterschaft, driving a Volvo 240 Turbo. He won two races, three pole-positions and set two fastest laps.
