= AVUS =

Public road in Berlin, Germany

Automobil-Verkehrs- und Übungsstraße (AVUS)
- Grand Prix Circuit (1951–1967)
- Location: Berlin, Germany
- Coordinates: 52°28′50″N 13°15′05″E
- Opened: 24 September 1921; 105 years ago
- Closed: 3 May 1998; 28 years ago
- Major events: Formula One; German Grand Prix (1926, 1959); Porsche Carrera Cup Germany (1986–1990, 1993, 1995, 1998); Super Tourenwagen Cup (1995–1996); DTM (1984–1995); German F3 (1975–1976, 1983–1985, 1987, 1989–1995); Interserie (1977, 1984–1985, 1987); DRM (1978, 1983, 1985); BMW M1 Procar Championship (1980); European F3 (1976); FIM EWC (1963); World Sportscar Championship (1962)

Grand Prix Circuit with Chicane (1994–1998)
- Length: 2.660 km (1.653 mi)
- Turns: 6
- Race lap record: 0:53.440 ( (Italy) Stefano Modena, Alfa Romeo 155 V6 TI, 1994, Class 1)

Grand Prix Circuit (1992–1993)
- Length: 2.639 km (1.640 mi)
- Turns: 4
- Race lap record: 0:54.920 ( (Italy) Max Angelelli, Dallara F393, 1993, F3)

Grand Prix Circuit (1989–1991)
- Length: 4.879 km (3.032 mi)
- Turns: 4
- Race lap record: 1:30.050 ( (Germany) Hans-Joachim Stuck, Audi V8 Quattro, 1991, Group A)

Grand Prix Circuit with Unbanked Nord Kehre (1968–1988)
- Length: 8.109 km (5.039 mi)
- Turns: 4
- Race lap record: 2:02.130 ( (West Germany) Volkert Merl, Porsche 956, 1983, Group C)

Grand Prix Circuit (1951–1967)
- Length: 8.300 km (5.157 mi)
- Turns: 4
- Banking: 43° (Nord Kehre)
- Race lap record: 2:04.500 ( (United Kingdom) Tony Brooks, Ferrari Dino 246, 1959, F1)

Grand Prix Circuit (1937–1939)
- Length: 19.291 km (11.987 mi)
- Turns: 4
- Banking: 43° (Nord Kehre)
- Race lap record: 4:11.200 ( (Germany) Bernd Rosemeyer, Auto Union Type C, 1937, GP)

Original Grand Prix Circuit (1921–1936)
- Length: 19.569 km (12.160 mi)
- Turns: 4
- Banking: 10° (Nord Kehre)
- Race lap record: 4:32.000 (Auto Union Type B, (Germany) Hans Stuck, 1935, GP)

Comparison of AVUS track banking to two other tracks

The Automobil-Verkehrs- und Übungsstraße ('Automobile traffic and training road'), known as AVUS (German pronunciation: [ˈaːvʊs]), is a public road in Berlin, Germany. Opened in 1921, it was also used as a motor racing circuit until 1998. Today, the AVUS forms the northern part of the Bundesautobahn 115. It hosted several pre-World War II races and one Formula One World Championship race - the 1959 German Grand Prix.

== Circuit ==
The highway is located in the southwestern districts of Berlin, linking the Stadtring at the Funkturm junction in Charlottenburg with Nikolassee. It runs through the Grunewald forest along the historic Königsweg road from Charlottenburg to Potsdam and the parallel Berlin-Blankenheim railway line.

It is unusually shaped for a race track as it is essentially two long straights in the form of a dual carriageway, with a hairpin corner at each end. The north curve featured a steep banking from 1937 to 1967. While the original layout was 19.569 km (12.160 mi) long, the southern turn was moved several times, to shorten the track to 8.300 km (5.157 mi), then 8.109 km (5.039 mi) without the banking, 4.879 km (3.032 mi) and finally 2.639 km (1.640 mi).

== History ==
=== Construction ===
In 1907 the Kaiserlicher Automobilclub (KAC) association devised a fee-financed circuit, as both a motor-sport venue and a testing track for the motor industry. A developing company was established in 1909; however, a lack of finances and official authorisations delayed the start of construction until spring 1913. During the Great War works discontinued, and though Russian Army prisoners were temporarily employed in AVUS's construction, the track was still unfinished. From 1920 the remaining road work was financed by businessman and politician Hugo Stinnes.

=== Early years ===
The circuit was inaugurated during the first post-war International Automobile Exhibition (IAA) with a motor race on 24 September 1921. Afterwards the road was open to the public at a charge of ten Marks.

At the time of opening, AVUS was 19.569 km (12.160 mi) long – each straight being approximately half that length, and joined at each end by flat, large-radius curves, driven counter-clockwise. The facilities included a gate building and several stands.

The circuit from 1922 was the site of motorcycle races. On 11 July 1926 the track played host to the first international German Grand Prix for sports cars, organised by the Automobilclub von Deutschland, the former KAC. The 1921 roadway turned out to be insufficient: Already, in practice two days before, the young Italian driver Enrico Platé (not to be confused with the Argentinian driver and team owner of the same name) was involved in a crash that killed his mechanic. During the race, in heavy rain, two track marshals died when Adolf Rosenberger lost control and hit the indicator board and the timekeeper's box, with a third employee succumbing to his injuries in hospital a few hours later. The Grand Prix was won by his fellow team-member, the so-far unknown Mercedes-Benz salesman Rudolf Caracciola, from Remagen, driving a private, eight-cylinder "Monza" Kompressor type. The fastest lap of 161 km/h (100 mph) was set by Ferdinando Minoia in an OM.

From 1927 the German Grand Prix was relocated to the new and more secure Nürburgring circuit in the Western German Eifel range, while the AVUS received a new asphalt surface and served as an experimental track for rocket cars.

On 23 May 1928 Fritz von Opel ("Rocket Fritz") achieved a speed record of 238 km/h (148 mph) in an Opel RAK2.

Due to the Great Depression annual auto races were not resumed until 1931, when Caracciola again won in a Mercedes-Benz SSK, succeeded by Manfred von Brauchitsch the next year after Caracciola had switched to Alfa Romeo.

The competition on 22 May 1932 saw further notable participants like the Earl Howe, Hans Stuck and Sir Malcolm Campbell. The Czechoslovak driver, Prince George Christian of Lobkowicz, died when his Bugatti Type 54 crashed in the southern hairpin. The following events were won by Achille Varzi (1933) and Guy Moll (1934), to the great annoyance of the new Nazi rulers, who declared the victory of German drivers and cars a matter of national pride. They strongly backed the construction of the new Silver Arrows (Silberpfeile) generation of Mercedes-Benz and Auto Union.

In 1935 Luigi Fagioli won the race in a Mercedes-Benz W25; however, the track was no longer adequate for cars reaching average race speeds of far over 200 km/h (124 mph). In an effort to make AVUS the "world's fastest race track", the 1936 season was skipped and while the track hosted the cycling road race, the marathon and 50 km walk athletic events of the 1936 Summer Olympics, the north curve was turned into a steeply banked turn (43°) made of bricks. It became dubbed the wall of death, especially as it had no retaining barrier, so cars that missed the turn easily flew off it. The Silver Arrows raced only once on the banked version, in 1937. As the AVUS race did not count towards the championship, non-GP cars were allowed, which permitted the use of streamlined cars, similar to the cars used for high speed record attempts. This race was run in two heats; during qualifying for the second heat, Luigi Fagioli stuck his Auto Union Type C on pole position, with a time of 4 minutes and 8.2 seconds at an average speed of 284.31 km/h (176.66 mph) - which was the fastest motor racing lap in history until this time was bettered by Tony Bettenhausen in qualifying for the 1957 Race of Two Worlds at Monza. It was also bettered by four drivers during the 1971 Indianapolis 500. Mercedes driver Hermann Lang's average race speed of about 276 km/h (171 mph) was the fastest road race in history for nearly five decades, and was not matched on a high-speed banked-circuit until the mid-1980s at the 1986 Indianapolis 500.

No major race was held after 1937 as, in early 1938, the popular German race driver Bernd Rosemeyer was killed in a land speed record attempt on a straight section of the Autobahn Frankfurt–Darmstadt (present-day Bundesautobahn 5), at which point the high-speed AVUS was considered too dangerous for the fast Grand Prix race cars. Furthermore, it was to be connected to the growing Reichsautobahn network in 1940 by extending it south towards the Berliner Ring, therefore the original hairpin at Nikolassee was demolished and replaced by a junction. A planned banked south turn was never built; the cleared grounds in the Grunewald forest were used as a proving ground ("Keerans Range") by the American occupation forces after World War II.

=== Post-war ===
The first AVUS race after the war was held on 1 July 1951 for Formula Two and Formula Three cars, won by East German driver Paul Greifzu. For post-war racing, the original extremely long straights were shortened by the introduction of a new south turn roughly in the middle (just before the Hüttenweg exit, where it can still be seen), reducing the track length to 8.300 km (5.157 mi).

After World War II, the Berlin Wall, with its Checkpoint Bravo at Dreilinden/Drewitz, came no closer than about one mile (1.6 km) to the former South Turn. It is a common yet incorrect belief that the Berlin Wall cut the AVUS in half.

It was not until 19 September 1954 that this shorter track hosted a non-championship Formula One race. This "Grand Prix of Berlin" was mainly a show dominated by the Mercedes-Benz W196 drivers Karl Kling (the winner) and Juan Manuel Fangio. No serious competition was present, as many teams had refused to show up and the German Grand Prix was still held on the Nürburgring.

AVUS hosted its only world championship Formula One race with the 1959 German Grand Prix on 2 August, won by Tony Brooks. This race weekend also saw the death of French driver Jean Behra in a supporting sports car race, as his Porsche RSK flew over the top of the north turn banking, as there was no wall or fence. German driver and journalist Richard von Frankenberg had previously walked away from a similar spectacular crash at the same site, but Behra would have no such luck as his body impacted a flagpole head-first after he was flung from his car.

After 1961, Grand Prix racing did not race on banked circuits until 2000. The banked sections at Autodromo Nazionale Monza and Autodrome de Linas-Montlhéry were considered dangerous by international racing standards. They were used in connection with chicanes for some time, then abandoned. Banking only returned to Formula One in 2000 when the series used a road course at the Indianapolis Motor Speedway.

The AVUS banking was dismantled in 1967 to give way to an expanded intersection under the Funkturm tower. From the top of this tower, one can see that the AVUS is not perfectly straight.

The old banked circuit can be seen in the film A Dandy in Aspic (1968) featuring period racing cars.

=== Final years ===
Racing was continued with a flat north turn, but AVUS only held national touring cars DTM and Formula Three events. The length of the track was roughly cut in half twice in the 1980s and 1990 as racing on straights became unpopular. Also, chicanes were added to reduce entry speed into the North Curve. Yet, some incidents and accidents occurred. The BMW of Dieter Quester rolled over when exiting the last corner, and crossed the finish line sliding on its roof, with sparks flying, for a podium finish. The car of John Winter hit a barrier and exploded into a fireball in North Curve, which he survived.

In 1995, the race 2 of Super Tourenwagen Cup had to be cancelled, after a multi-car pileup blocked the circuit; later that September, British driver Kieth O'dor was killed in a Super Touring Car event when his car spun and was rammed sideways, with the impact on the driver's side.

=== AVUS today ===
After the fall of the Berlin wall, the closure of the AVUS for race events became increasingly problematic over traffic and associated environmental concerns. After the last races in 1998, a farewell event with veterans was held in 1999. Since 2000, the new EuroSpeedway Lausitz in Brandenburg is considered the replacement venue for competition. The round race control tower at the north end still remains with its prominent Mercedes-Benz and Bosch sponsorship insignia. It was used as a (now closed) public restaurant and motel. The old wooden grandstand is protected as a historic monument.

== Gallery ==
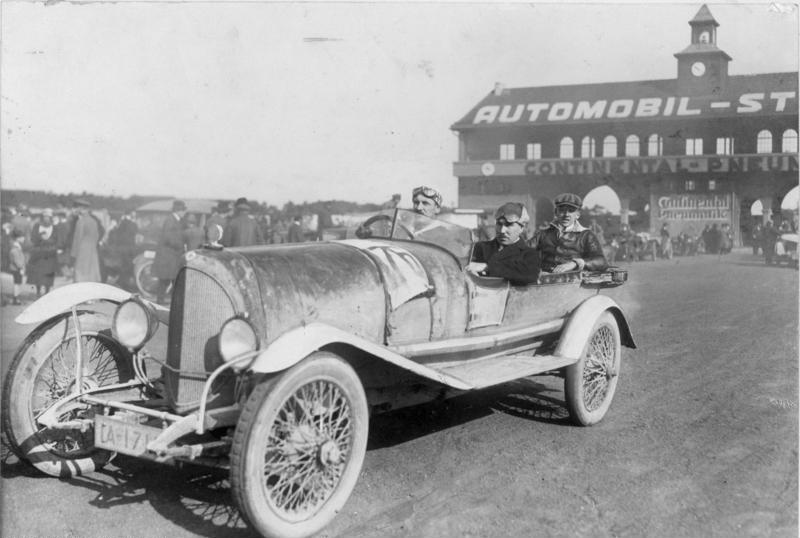
ADAC Reichsfahrt, 1922

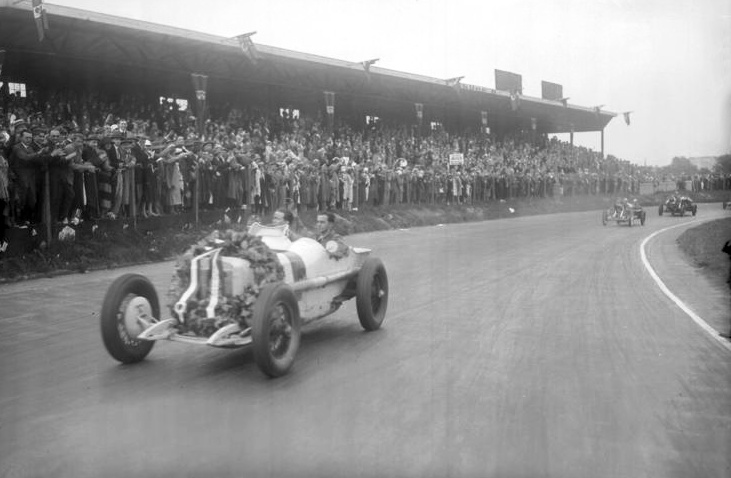
Caracciola (left) after winning the 1926 German Grand Prix

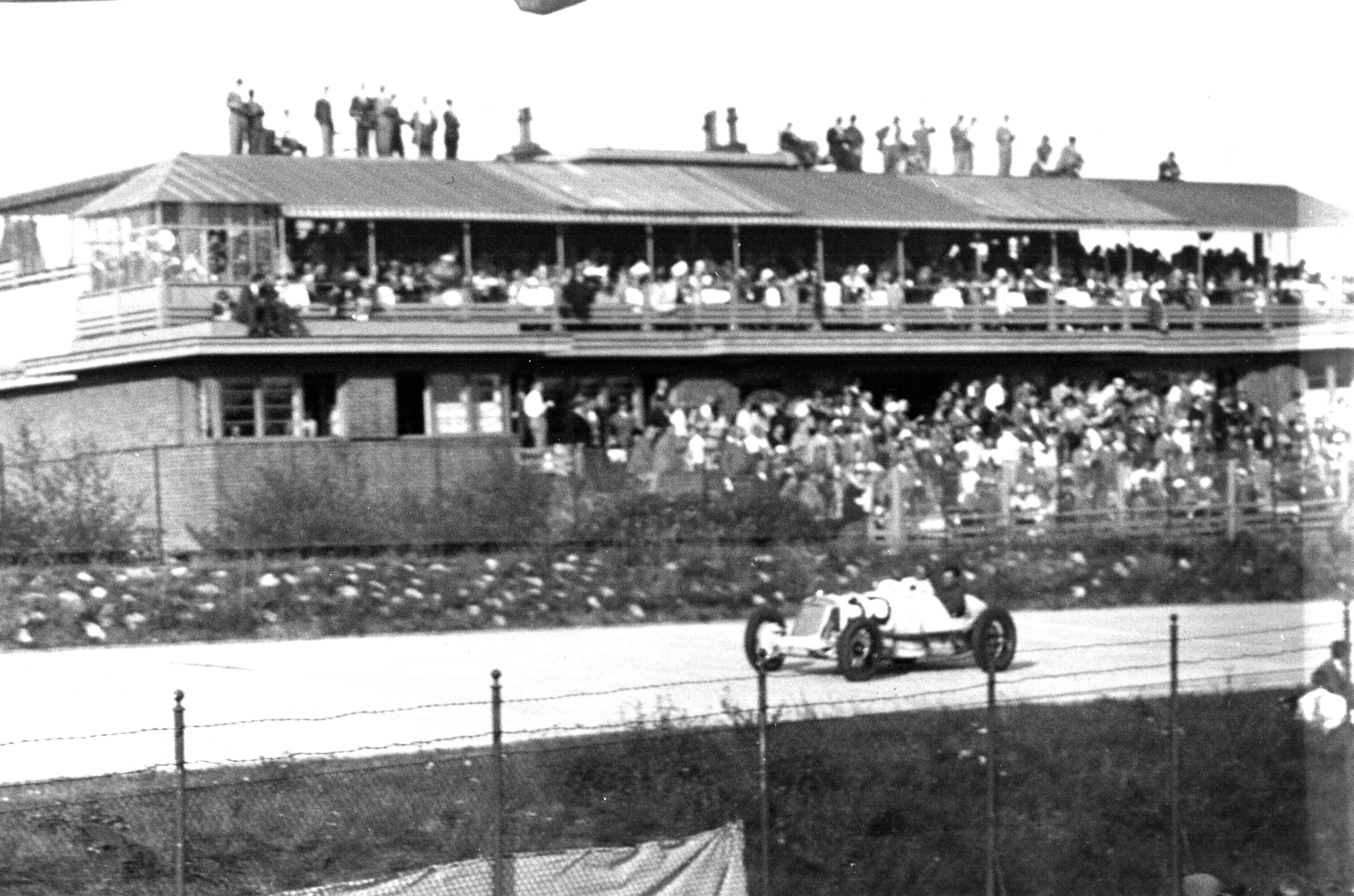
AVUS race, 1931

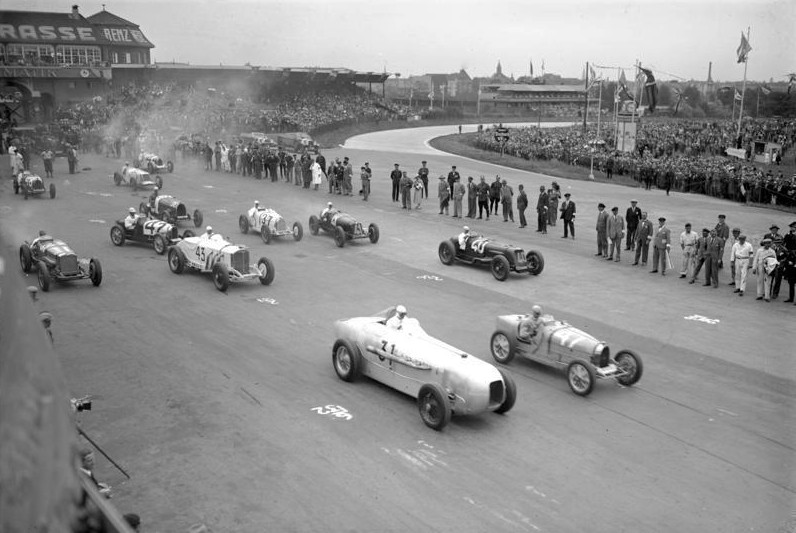
Start of the 1932 race, with Manfred von Brauchitsch in front

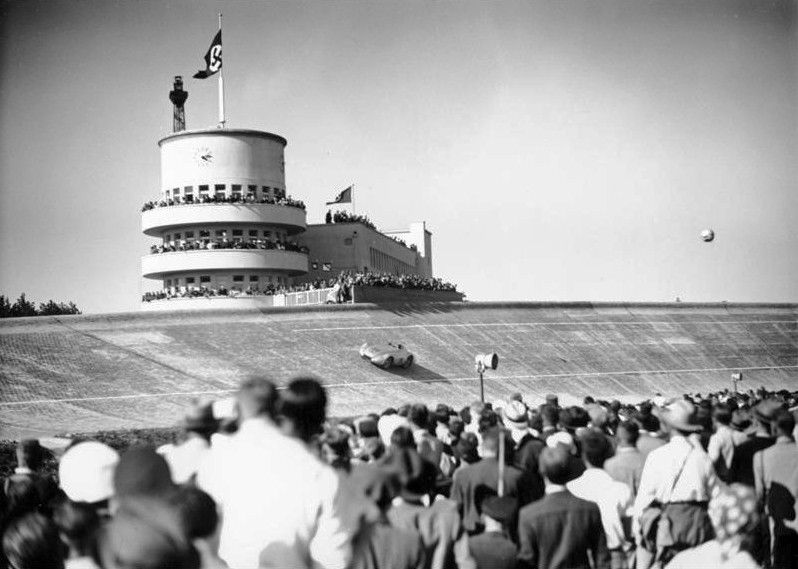
Streamlined Mercedes-Benz W25 Silver Arrow on the banking, 1937

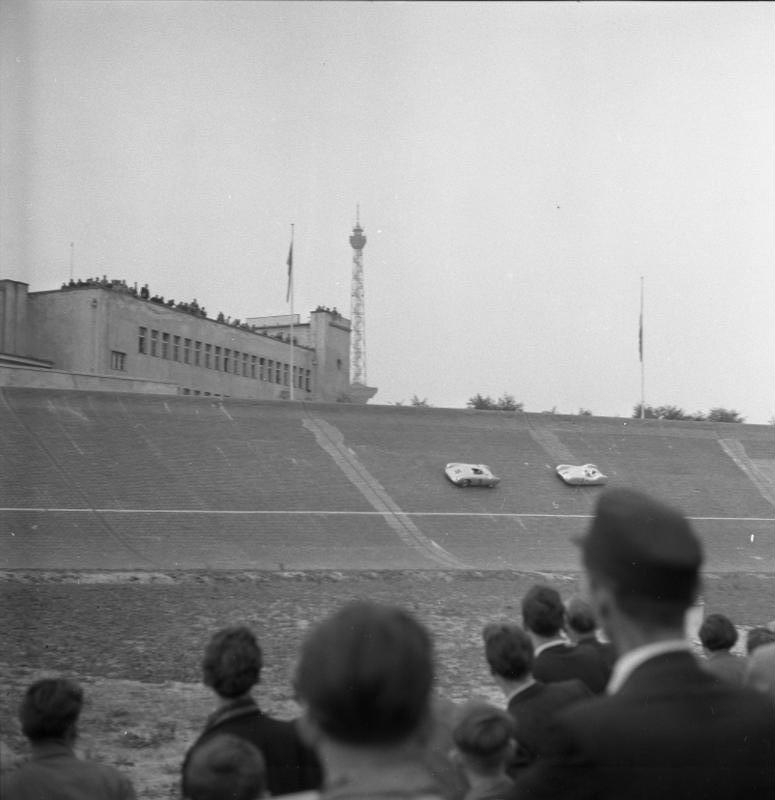
1955 race, two cars on the north banking

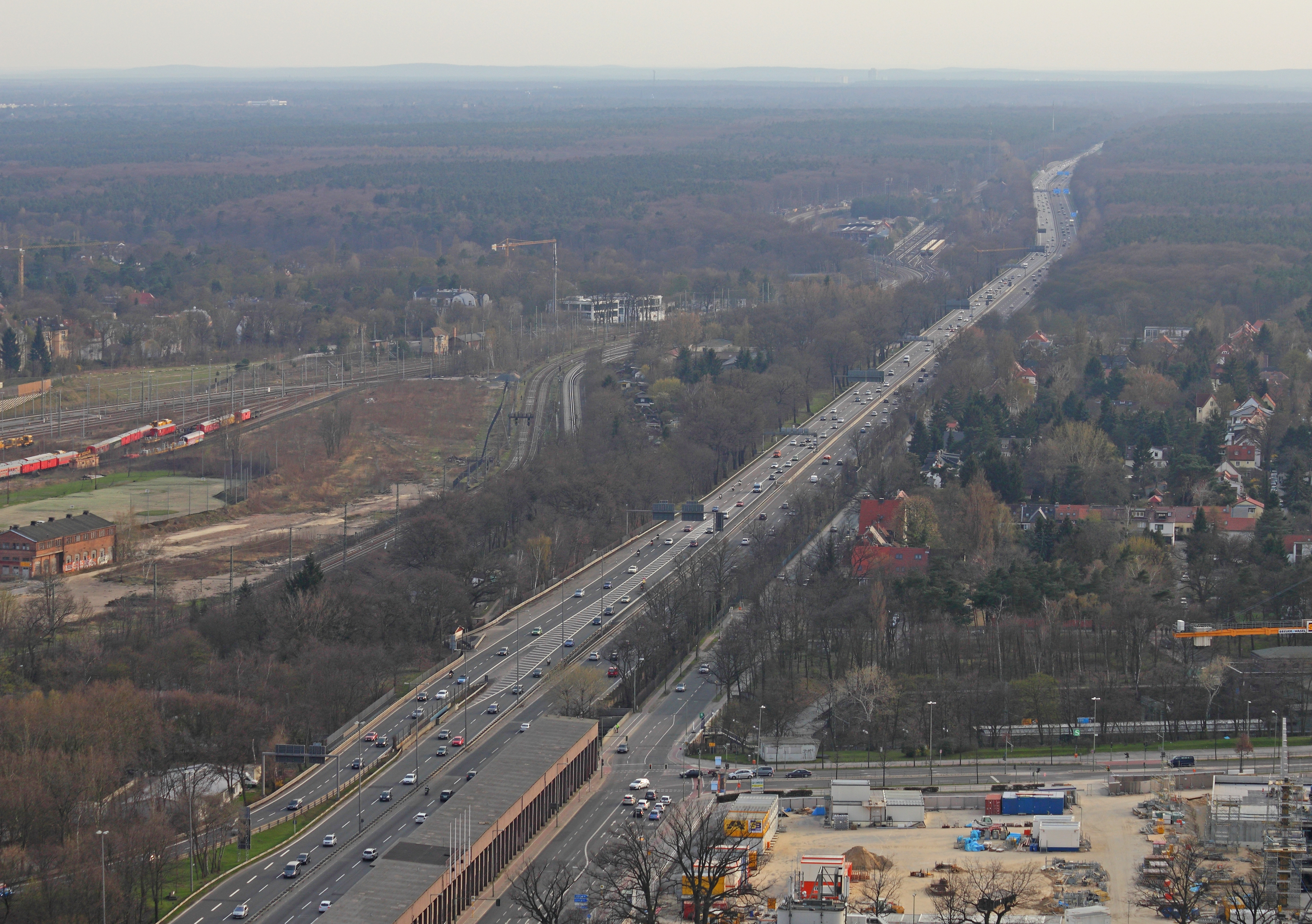
North end, view from Nordspitze

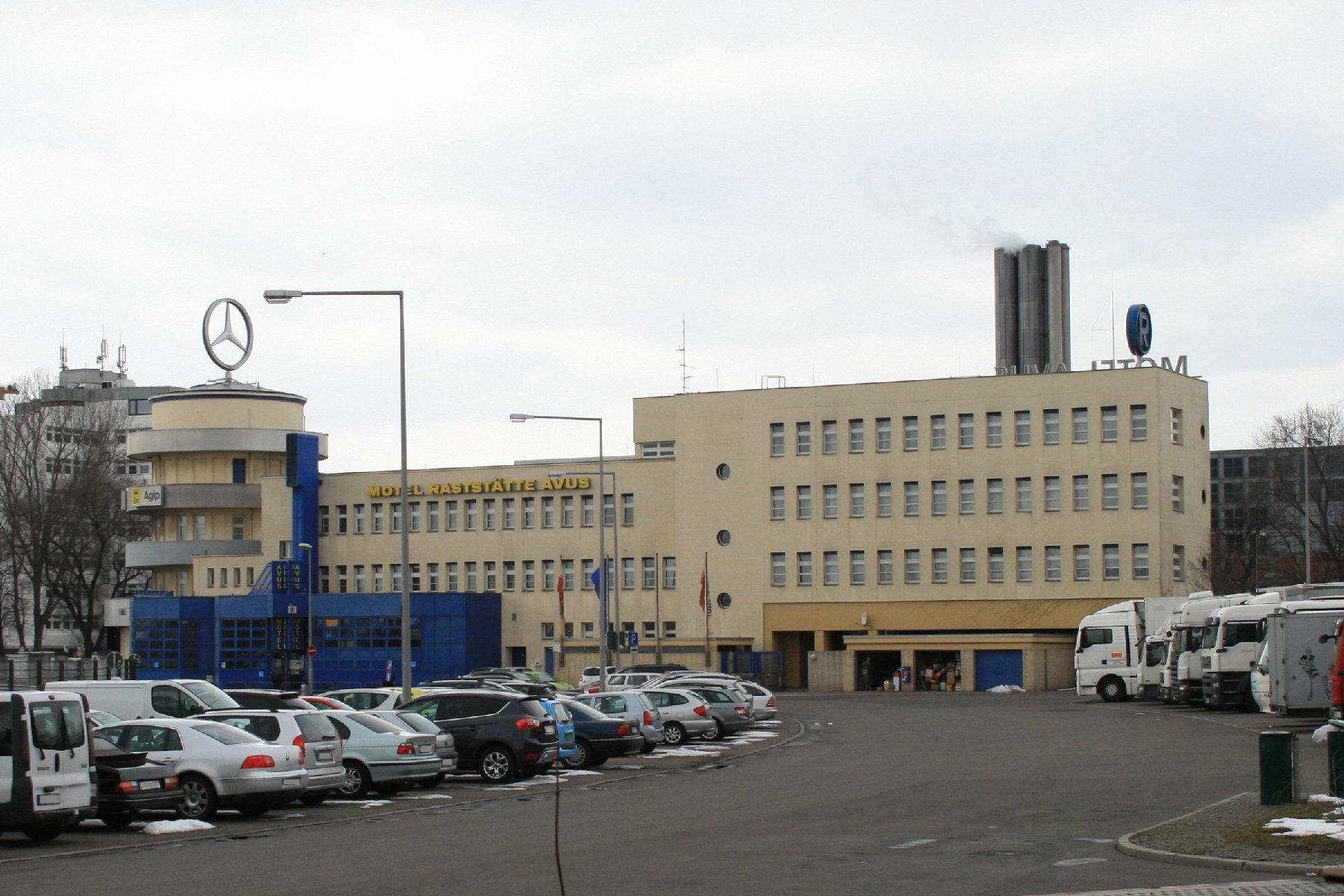
Motel with former control tower

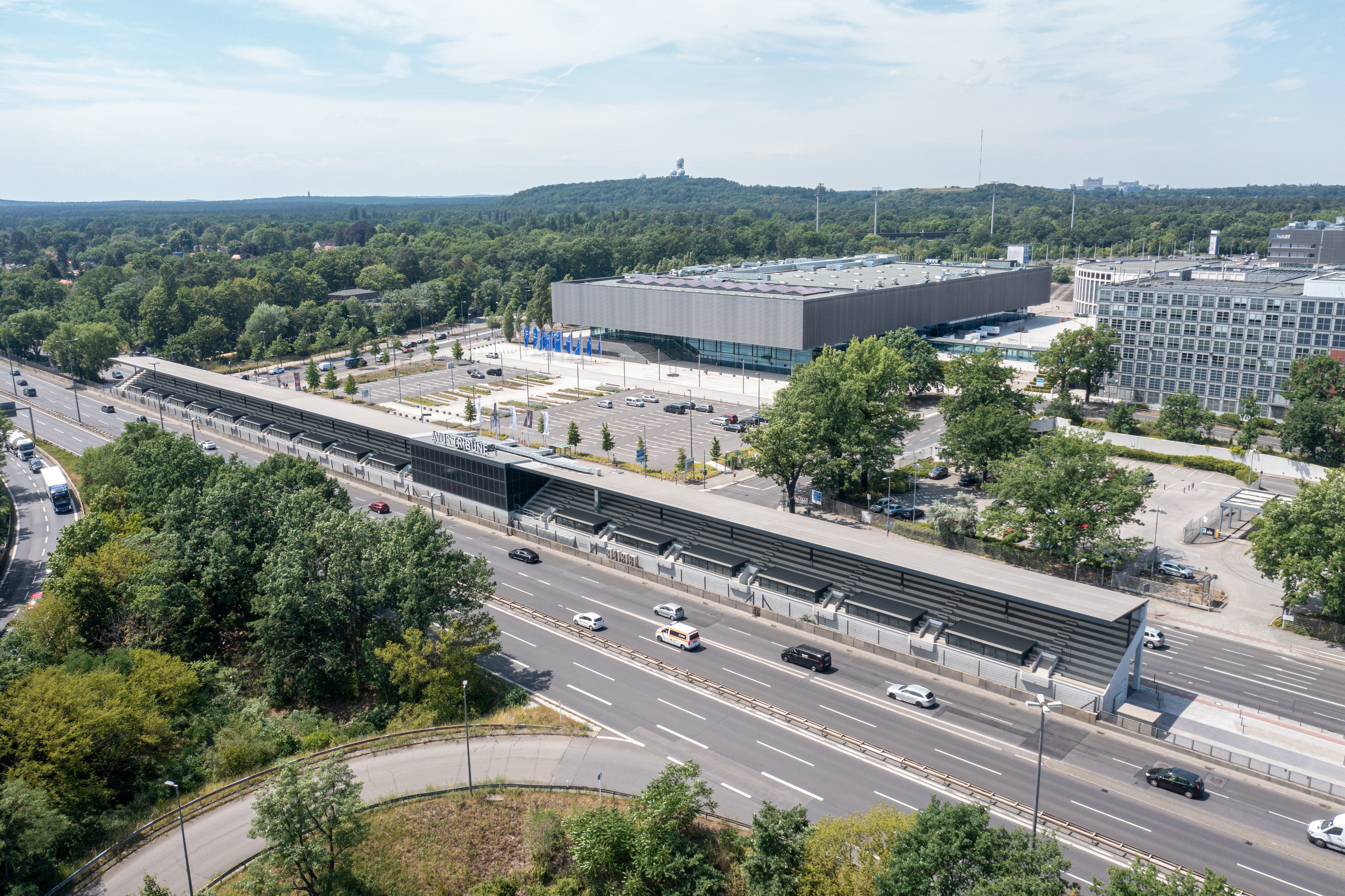
The grandstand in 2022

== Lap times ==
The fastest official race lap records at AVUS are listed as:

Category	Time	Driver	Vehicle	Event
Grand Prix Circuit with Chicane (1994–1998): 2.660 km (1.653 mi)
Class 1 Touring Cars	0:53.440	(Italy) Stefano Modena	Alfa Romeo 155 V6 TI	1994 AVUS DTM round
Formula Three	0:54.100	(Germany) Jörg Müller	Dallara F394	1994 AVUS German F3 round
Super Touring	0:59.620	(Germany) Roland Asch	Ford Mondeo Ghia	1995 AVUS STW Cup round
Group B	1:00.240	(Germany) Ralf Kelleners	Porsche 911 (964) Carrera RSR 3.8	1994 Internationales ADAC Avus Rennen
Grand Prix Circuit (1992–1993): 2.639 km (1.640 mi)
Formula Three	0:54.920	(Italy) Max Angelelli	Dallara F393	1993 AVUS German F3 round
Class 1 Touring Cars	0:56.480	(Italy) Nicola Larini	Alfa Romeo 155 V6 TI	1993 AVUS DTM round
Group A	0:57.020	(Germany) Bernd Schneider	Mercedes 190E 2.5-16 Evo2	1992 AVUS DTM round
Group B	1:02.510	(Germany) Harald Grohs	Porsche 911 (964) Carrera RSR 3.8	1993 Internationales ADAC-Avus-Rennen
Grand Prix Circuit (1989–1991): 4.879 km (3.032 mi)
Group A	1:30.050	(Germany) Hans-Joachim Stuck	Audi V8 Quattro	1991 AVUS DTM round
Formula Three	1:32.300	(Germany) Meik Wagner	Eufra 391	1991 AVUS German F3 round
Grand Prix Circuit (1968–1988): 8.109 km (5.039 mi)
Group C	2:02.130	(West Germany) Volkert Merl	Porsche 956	1983 Int. ADAC-Avus-Rennen um den Großen Preis der BZ
Group 5 Special Production	2:03.400	(Netherlands) Toine Hezemans	Porsche 935/77A	1978 Internationales ADAC Mampe Avus-Rennen
Group 5 Sports Car	2:04.400	(United Kingdom) Derek Bell	Alfa Romeo T/33/TT/12	1977 AVUS Interserie round
BMW M1 Procar	2:14.510	(Netherlands) Jan Lammers	BMW M1 Procar	1980 AVUS BMW M1 Procar round
Group B	2:16.170	(West Germany) Harald Grohs	BMW M1	1983 Int. ADAC-Avus-Rennen um den Großen Preis der BZ
Sports 2000	2:19.120	(West Germany) Rolf Götz	Chevron B31	1984 Int. ADAC-Avus-Rennen um den Großen Preis der BZ
Group A	2:26.270	(West Germany) Armin Hahne	Ford Sierra RS500 Cosworth	1988 AVUS DTM round
Formula Three	2:26.340	(West Germany) Harald Brutschin	Ralt RT3	1984 AVUS German F3 round
Grand Prix Circuit (1951–1967): 8.300 km (5.157 mi)
Formula One	2:04.500	(United Kingdom) Tony Brooks	Ferrari Dino 246	1959 German Grand Prix
Group 4	2:13.500	(West Germany) Gerhard Koch	Porsche 906	1967 AVUS Grand Prix
Formula Two	2:31.900	(West Germany) Theo Helfrich	Veritas RS	1953 Avusrennen
Sports car racing	2:40.100	(Switzerland) Robert Jenny	Fiat-Abarth 1000	1962 Berlin Grand Prix
Grand Prix Circuit (1937–1939): 19.291 km (11.987 mi)
GP	4:11.200	(Germany) Bernd Rosemeyer	Auto Union Type C	1937 Avusrennen
Voiturette	5:51.200	(United Kingdom) Charlie Martin	ERA A-Type	1937 Avus Voiturette race
Original Grand Prix Circuit (1921–1936): 19.573 km (12.162 mi)
GP	4:32.000	(Germany) Hans Stuck	Auto Union Type B	1935 Avusrennen
Voiturette	6:17.000	(France) Pierre Veyron	Bugatti T51A	1933 Avus Voiturette race

== See also ==
- List of Formula One circuits
- Lausitzring

== Bibliography ==
- Eckhart Stolzenburg. Die grössten AVUS Rennen: Chronik (in German). Allgemeiner Deutscher Automobil-Club (ADAC) Gau Berlin e.V. ASIN B0CNW91D6N.
- Richard Kitschigin (1972). Rennen, Reifen und Rekorde - Die AVUS-Story (in German). Motorbuch Verlag. ISBN 978-3879432066.
- Ulrich Kubisch & Gert Rietner (1987). Die AVUS im Rückspiegel: Rennen, Rekorde, Rückstaus (in German). Elefanten Press - ESPRESSO Verlag. ISBN 978-3885202325.
- Richard Kitschigin (1995). Mythos AVUS: Automobilsport in Berlin (in German). Ullstein Verlag. ISBN 978-3550069000.
- Axel Kirchner (28 February 2008). Die AVUS: Deutschlands legendäre Rennstrecke – Acht Jahrzehnte Motorsport (in German). Delius Klasing. ISBN 978-3768824521.
- Ulf Schulz & Sven Wedemeyer (30 August 2021). AVUS 100: Ein rasantes Jahrhundert (in German). Prestel Verlag. ISBN 978-3-7913-8831-1.
- Antonia Schulemann (20 October 2021). Perspektive AVUS: Im Rausch der Zeit (in German). Books on Mars / GH Medienhaus Berlin. ISBN 978-3000701153.
