= 1989 Deutsche Tourenwagen Meisterschaft =

German touring car championship season

Seasons
- ← 1988 1990 →

The 1989 Deutsche Tourenwagen Meisterschaft was the sixth season of premier German touring car championship and also fourth season under the moniker of Deutsche Tourenwagen Meisterschaft.

The championship was the last to run under heavily modified Group A regulations, including the use of air restrictors. The champion was Roberto Ravaglia with 3 victories driving a BMW M3 Evo.

1989 was the final season of DTM that featured turbocharged engines until 2019, as in 1990 the DTM would move to a more unique ruleset varying greatly from the traditional Group A regulations.

== Bibliography ==
- Osterroth, Jochen von (1989). Deutsche Tourenwagen-Meisterschaft 1989: Das offizielle Jahrbuch (in German). Essen: Klartext Verlag. ISBN 978-3-88474-442-0.
- Voigt, Thomas (1989). Tourenwagen Story '89 (in German). Hamburg: tsv top special Verlag.
