= 1988 Deutsche Tourenwagen Meisterschaft =

German touring car championship season

Seasons
- ← 1987 1989 →

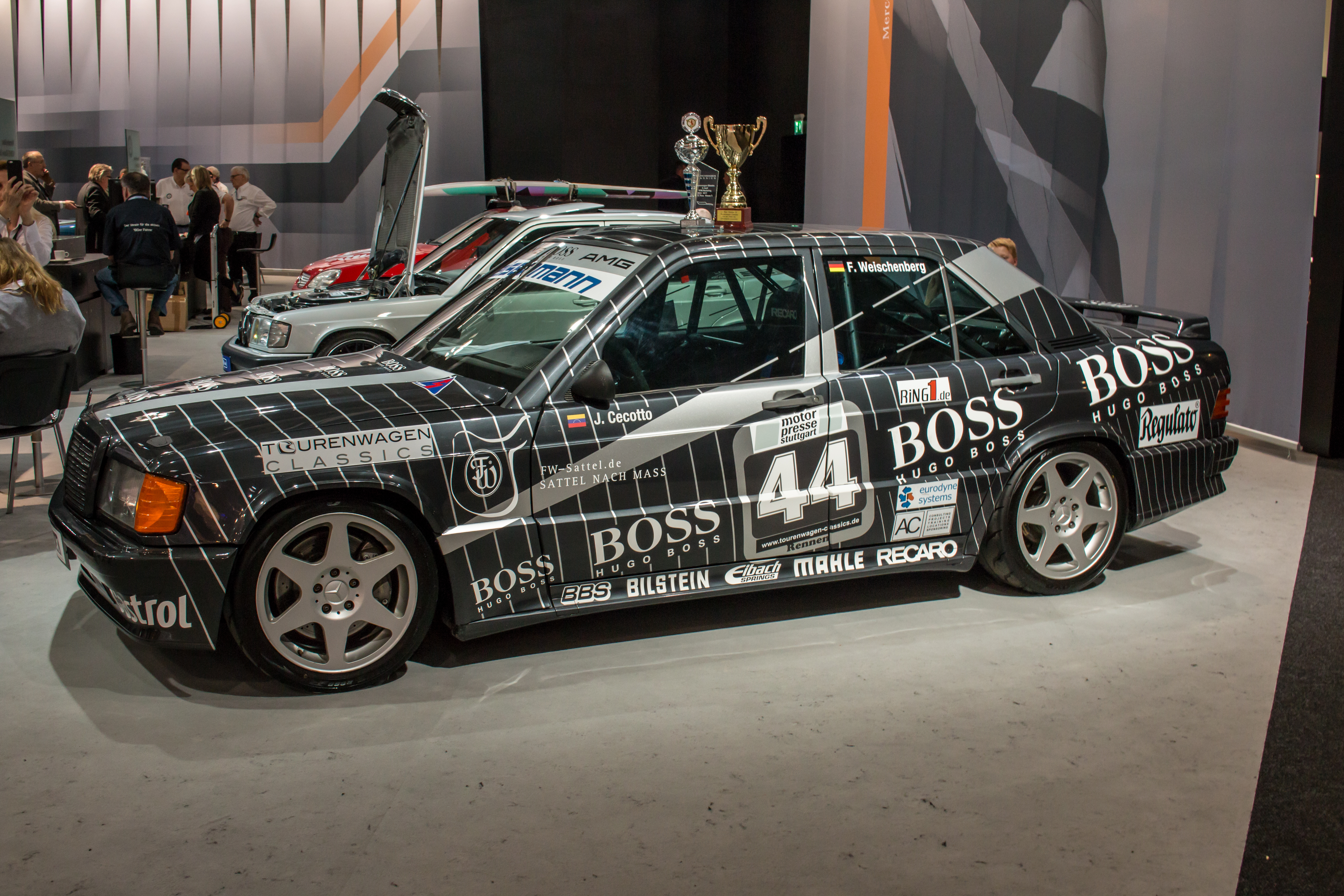
Mercedes-Benz 190 E 2.3-16 of Johnny Cecotto

The 1988 Deutsche Tourenwagen Meisterschaft was the fifth season of premier German touring car championship and also third season under the moniker of Deutsche Tourenwagen Meisterschaft.

The championship was run under heavily modified Group A regulations, including the use of air restrictors. The champion was Klaus Ludwig with 5 victories driving a Ford Sierra RS500 Cosworth.

== Bibliography ==
- Osterroth, Jochen von (1988). Deutsche Tourenwagen-Meisterschaft 1988: Das offizielle Jahrbuch (in German). Essen: Klartext Verlag. ISBN 978-3-88474-434-5.
- Voigt, Thomas (1988). Tourenwagen Story '88 (in German). Hamburg: tsv top special Verlag.
