= 1991 Deutsche Tourenwagen Meisterschaft =

German touring car championship season

Seasons
- ← 1990 1992 →

The 1991 Deutsche Tourenwagen Meisterschaft was the eighth season of premier German touring car championship and also sixth season under the moniker of Deutsche Tourenwagen Meisterschaft. The season had twelve rounds with two races each.

The winner was Frank Biela in Audi V8 quattro with 174 points.

== Teams and drivers ==
Team	Car	No.	Drivers	Rounds
(Germany) Schmidt Motorsport Technik	Audi V8 quattro	1	(Germany) Hans-Joachim Stuck	All
(Germany) Schmidt Motorsport Technik	Audi V8 quattro	2	(Germany) Hubert Haupt	1–9, 11–12
(Germany) Schmidt Motorsport Technik	Audi V8 quattro	46	(Germany) Walter Röhrl	10
(Germany) Schnitzer Motorsport	BMW M3 Sport Evolution	3	(Venezuela) Johnny Cecotto	All
(Germany) Schnitzer Motorsport	BMW M3 Sport Evolution	4	(Germany) Joachim Winkelhock	All
(Germany) Schnitzer Motorsport	BMW M3 Sport Evolution	5	(Denmark) Kris Nissen	All
(Germany) AMG-Mercedes	Mercedes 190E 2.5-16 Evo2	7	(Denmark) Kurt Thiim	All
(Germany) AMG-Mercedes	Mercedes 190E 2.5-16 Evo2	8	(Germany) Klaus Ludwig	All
(Germany) AMG-Mercedes	Mercedes 190E 2.5-16 Evo2	78	(Germany) Ellen Lohr	All
(Germany) AMG-Mercedes	Mercedes 190E 2.5-16 Evo2	87	(Germany) Fritz Kreutzpointner	All
(Germany) Snobeck S.A.	Mercedes 190E 2.5-16 Evo2	9	(France) Alain Cudini	All
(Germany) Snobeck S.A.	Mercedes 190E 2.5-16 Evo2	10	(France) Jacques Laffite	All
(Italy) BMW M Team Bigazzi	BMW M3 Sport Evolution	11	(United Kingdom) Steve Soper	All
(Italy) BMW M Team Bigazzi	BMW M3 Sport Evolution	12	(Germany) Armin Hahne	All
(Germany) Unitron Motorsport	BMW M3 Sport Evolution	13	(Germany) Peter Zakowski	All
(Germany) Unitron Motorsport	BMW M3 Sport Evolution	14	(Germany) Ralf Kelleners	All
(Germany) Linder Motorsport	BMW M3 Sport Evolution	15	(Austria) Dieter Quester	1–8, 11–12
(Germany) Linder Motorsport	BMW M3 Sport Evolution	16	(Germany) Altfrid Heger	All
(Germany) Linder Motorsport	BMW M3 Sport Evolution	17	(Germany) Annette Meeuvissen	1–10
(Germany) Linder Motorsport	BMW M3 Sport Evolution	65	(Switzerland) Alain Menu	9–10
(Germany) Team Zakspeed	Mercedes 190E 2.5-16 Evo2	18	(France) Fabien Giroix	1–5
(Germany) Team Zakspeed	Mercedes 190E 2.5-16 Evo2	19	(Germany) Roland Asch	All
(Germany) Team Zakspeed	Mercedes 190E 2.5-16 Evo2	20	(Germany) Michael Schumacher	6–7
(Germany) Team Zakspeed	Mercedes 190E 2.5-16 Evo2	88	(Germany) Bernd Schneider	8–10, 12
(Germany) MS-Jet-Racing	Mercedes 190E 2.5-16 Evo2	22	(Germany) Frank Schmickler	1–7
(Germany) MS-Jet-Racing	Mercedes 190E 2.5-16 Evo2	23	(Germany) Jörg van Ommen	All
(Germany) MS-Jet-Racing	Mercedes 190E 2.5-16 Evo2	24	(Germany) Jochen Mass	1, 5, 7
(Germany) Eggenberger Motorenbau	Opel Omega 3000 Evo 500	25	(Germany) Klaus Niedzwiedz	All
(Germany) Eggenberger Motorenbau	Opel Omega 3000 Evo 500	26	(France) Alain Ferté	All
(Germany) Clim Air	BMW M3 Sport Evolution	28	(Germany) Kurt König	All
(Germany) Isert Motorsport	BMW M3 Sport Evolution	29	(Germany) Markus Oestreich	6
(Germany) Isert Motorsport	BMW M3 Sport Evolution	30	(Germany) Leopold von Bayern	1–4, 6–10
(Germany) MM-Diebels	BMW M3 Sport Evolution	31	(Germany) Christian Danner	1–5, 8–10
(Germany) MM-Diebels	BMW M3 Sport Evolution	32	(Germany) Otto Rensing	1–5, 9–10
(Germany) MM-Diebels	BMW M3 Sport Evolution	33	(Germany) Günter Murmann	4, 6, 11
(Germany) Valier Motorsport	BMW M3 Sport Evolution	34	(Italy) Luca Maggiorelli	2–8
(Germany) Irmscher	Opel Omega 3000 Evo 500	22	(Germany) Frank Schmickler	8, 10
(Germany) Irmscher	Opel Omega 3000 Evo 500	36	(Germany) Franz Engstler	1–6, 8–12
(Germany) Irmscher	Opel Omega 3000 Evo 500	37	(Germany) Volker Strycek	2–10
(Germany) Irmscher	Opel Omega 3000 Evo 500	74	(Austria) Sepp Haider	7
(Germany) Tauber Motorsport	BMW M3 Sport Evolution	38	(Germany) Michael Ickenstein	1
(Germany) Tauber Motorsport	BMW M3 Sport Evolution	39	(Germany) Franz Dufter	2
(Germany) Tauber Motorsport	BMW M3 Sport Evolution	43	(Canada) Allen Berg	3–10
(Germany) Ruch Motorsport	Ford Mustang GT	40	(Germany) Gerd Ruch	3–12
(Germany) Ruch Motorsport	Ford Mustang GT	41	(Germany) Fred Räker	3, 5–9, 12
(Germany) Ruch Motorsport	Ford Mustang GT	47	(Germany) Jürgen Ruch	4
(Netherlands) Marlboro BMW Dealer Team	BMW M3 Sport Evolution	42	(Netherlands) Cor Euser	1, 3, 5–8, 10
(Germany) Audi Zentrum Reutlingen	Audi V8 quattro	44	(Germany) Frank Jelinski	All
(Germany) Audi Zentrum Reutlingen	Audi V8 quattro	45	(Germany) Frank Biela	All
(Germany) BAS Motorsport	Mercedes 190E 2.5-16 Evo2	50	(Germany) Armin Bernhard	All
(Germany) Gronemeyer Automobiltechnik	Ford Mustang GT	51	(Germany) Heinz Becker	4–5
(Czechoslovakia) Team Vanicek	BMW M3 Sport Evolution	55	(Germany) Harald Becker	1–6, 8–10
(Czechoslovakia) Team Vanicek	BMW M3 Sport Evolution	57	(Czechoslovakia) Josef Venc	11
(Germany) Team Schübel	Opel Omega 3000 Evo 500	66	(Germany) Peter Oberndorfer	1–7, 9–12
(Germany) Team Schübel	Opel Omega 3000 Evo 500	99	(Germany) Manuel Reuter	8

== Schedule and results ==
Round		Country	Circuit	Date	Pole position	Fastest lap	Winning driver	Winning team	Report
1	R1	Belgium	Zolder	31 March	(Venezuela) Johnny Cecotto	(Germany) Joachim Winkelhock	(Venezuela) Johnny Cecotto	Schnitzer Motorsport	Report
1	R2	Belgium	Zolder	31 March		(France) Alain Cudini	(Venezuela) Johnny Cecotto	Schnitzer Motorsport	Report
2	R1	Germany	Hockenheimring	14 April	(Germany) Armin Hahne	(United Kingdom) Steve Soper	(United Kingdom) Steve Soper	BMW M Team Bigazzi	Report
2	R2	Germany	Hockenheimring	14 April		(United Kingdom) Steve Soper	(United Kingdom) Steve Soper	BMW M Team Bigazzi	Report
3	R1	Germany	Nürburgring	21 April	(Denmark) Kurt Thiim	(Germany) Joachim Winkelhock	(Germany) Klaus Ludwig	AMG-Mercedes	Report
3	R2	Germany	Nürburgring	21 April		(Venezuela) Johnny Cecotto	(Germany) Klaus Ludwig	AMG-Mercedes	Report
4	R1	Germany	AVUS	5 May	(Germany) Hans-Joachim Stuck	(Germany) Hubert Haupt	(Germany) Hans-Joachim Stuck	Schmidt Motorsport Technik	Report
4	R2	Germany	AVUS	5 May		(Germany) Hans-Joachim Stuck	(Germany) Frank Biela	Audi Zentrum Reutlingen	Report
5	R1	Germany	Wunstorf	9 June	(Venezuela) Johnny Cecotto	(Germany) Joachim Winkelhock	(Germany) Joachim Winkelhock	Schnitzer Motorsport	Report
5	R2	Germany	Wunstorf	9 June		(Venezuela) Johnny Cecotto	(Venezuela) Johnny Cecotto	Schnitzer Motorsport	Report
6	R1	Germany	Norisring	30 June	(Germany) Roland Asch	(Denmark) Kurt Thiim	(Denmark) Kurt Thiim	AMG-Mercedes	Report
6	R2	Germany	Norisring	30 June		(Germany) Hans-Joachim Stuck	(Germany) Hans-Joachim Stuck	Schmidt Motorsport Technik	Report
7	R1	Germany	Diepholz Airfield Circuit	4 August	(France) Jacques Laffite	(Germany) Roland Asch	(Germany) Hans-Joachim Stuck	Schmidt Motorsport Technik	Report
7	R2	Germany	Diepholz Airfield Circuit	4 August		(Germany) Klaus Ludwig	(Germany) Steve Soper	BMW M Team Bigazzi	Report
8	R1	Germany	Nürburgring	8 September	(Germany) Roland Asch	(Germany) Roland Asch	(Germany) Klaus Ludwig	AMG-Mercedes	Report
8	R2	Germany	Nürburgring	8 September		(France) Jacques Laffite	(Germany) Klaus Ludwig	AMG-Mercedes	Report
9	R1	Germany	Alemannenring	15 September	(Germany) Frank Biela	(Germany) Hans-Joachim Stuck	(Germany) Frank Biela	Audi Zentrum Reutlingen	Report
9	R2	Germany	Alemannenring	15 September		(Germany) Bernd Schneider	(Germany) Hans-Joachim Stuck	Schmidt Motorsport Technik	Report
10	R1	Germany	Hockenheimring	29 September	(Germany) Frank Biela	(Germany) Frank Biela	(Germany) Frank Biela	Audi Zentrum Reutlingen	Report
10	R2	Germany	Hockenheimring	29 September		(Germany) Hans-Joachim Stuck	(Germany) Frank Biela	Audi Zentrum Reutlingen	Report
11	R1	Czechoslovakia	Brno	6 October	(Germany) Roland Asch	(Germany) Klaus Ludwig	(Germany) Klaus Ludwig	AMG-Mercedes	Report
11	R2	Czechoslovakia	Brno	6 October		(Germany) Altfrid Heger	(United Kingdom) Steve Soper	Bigazzi	Report
12	R1	(United Kingdom) Great Britain	Donington Park	20 October	(Germany) Frank Biela	(United Kingdom) Steve Soper	(Germany) Frank Biela	Audi Zentrum Reutlingen	Report
12	R2	(United Kingdom) Great Britain	Donington Park	20 October		(Germany) Frank Biela	(Germany) Frank Biela	Audi Zentrum Reutlingen	Report

DTM race
ITR race

== Championship standings ==
Points system
1st	2nd	3rd	4th	5th	6th	7th	8th	9th	10th
20	15	12	10	8	6	4	3	2	1

Pos.	Driver	ZOL (Belgium)		HOC1 (Germany)		NÜR1 (Germany)		AVU (Germany)		WUN (Germany)		NOR (Germany)		DIE (Germany)		NÜR2 (Germany)		ALE (Germany)		HOC2 (Germany)		BRN (Czechoslovakia)		DON (United Kingdom)		Pts.
1	(Germany) Frank Biela	15	3	19	3	6	7	2	1	5	4	5	11	4	6	8	11	1	DSQ	1	1	11	7	1	1	174
2	(Germany) Klaus Ludwig	2	14	7	7	1	1	7	Ret	3	3	Ret	7	8	3	1	1	9	Ret	6	5	1	Ret	4	4	166
3	(Germany) Hans-Joachim Stuck	9	2	11	26	10	Ret	1	2	16	11	6	1	1	4	9	16	3	1	14	2	Ret	Ret	Ret	8	158
4	(Venezuela) Johnny Cecotto	1	1	9	DSQ	2	Ret	6	5	6	1	14	6	12	2	10	4	5	Ret	4	13	5	5	3	3	147
5	(United Kingdom) Steve Soper	5	15	1	1	Ret	16	5	4	20	6	9	4	2	1	5	14	6	16	Ret	29	2	1	2	2	133
6	(France) Alain Cudini	7	Ret	4	2	7	5	NC	Ret	2	9	4	Ret	15	8	2	2	Ret	DNS	9	8	9	10	8	Ret	106
7	(Germany) Joachim Winkelhock	8	Ret	3	17	Ret	3	8	6	1	2	11	Ret	DSQ	5	7	Ret	Ret	4	5	15	6	Ret	7	6	101
8	(Denmark) Kurt Thiim	4	4	6	4	Ret	9	13	Ret	12	Ret	1	2	9	Ret	27	7	2	Ret	8	11	4	4	10	Ret	97
9	(Germany) Roland Asch	10	7	8	Ret	4	Ret	10	7	7	7	3	3	7	7	4	5	Ret	Ret	7	6	3	2	21	Ret	91
10	(Germany) Frank Jelinski	17	10	12	6	11	8	3	Ret	Ret	Ret	7	5	21	Ret	Ret	Ret	4	3	2	3	16	6	6	16	83
11	(France) Jacques Laffite	21	Ret	5	9	5	6	15	21	4	5	13	8	3	Ret	3	3	DNS	DNS	12	12	13	Ret	5	7	81
11	(Denmark) Kris Nissen	3	Ret	28	13	8	4	32	10	19	Ret	2	DNS	10	13	13	Ret	8	10	DNS	DNS	15	8	9	5	46
13	(Germany) Jörg van Ommen	14	8	10	10	3	2	9	8	Ret	15	Ret	Ret	16	11	DSQ	Ret	13	Ret	Ret	9	10	Ret	11	9	39
14	(Germany) Armin Hahne	6	Ret	2	12	Ret	13	Ret	Ret	9	20	10	Ret	5	Ret	15	Ret	7	12	31	DNS	8	3	Ret	13	36
15	(Germany) Bernd Schneider															11	6	23	2	10	7			Ret	DNS	26
16	(Germany) Hubert Haupt	19	DNS	26	DNS	15	11	4	3	10	Ret	8	Ret	DSQ	16	Ret	DNS	DSQ	DNS			12	Ret	Ret	DNS	26
17	(Germany) Walter Röhrl																			3	4					22
18	(Germany) Altfrid Heger	16	11	16	24	9	Ret	14	Ret	8	8	Ret	10	28	Ret	6	8	12	Ret	11	17	7	Ret	12	11	18
19	(Germany) Fritz Kreutzpointner	12	5	14	29	14	Ret	12	9	Ret	10	12	9	11	Ret	12	9	10	Ret	13	10	17	9	Ret	10	17
20	(Germany) Otto Rensing	Ret	18	Ret	20	18	14	25	20	Ret	DNS							17	5	27	Ret					8
21	(Germany) Christian Danner	23	6	18	14	16	12	Ret	DNS	22	Ret	DNQ	DNQ	DNS	DNS	Ret	12	14	Ret	29	19					6
22	(Germany) Peter Oberndorfer	27	20	Ret	DNS	29	DNS	19	12	18	Ret	18	18	30	DNS			24	6	30	Ret	20	DNS	14	14	6
23	(France) Fabien Giroix	19	9	Ret	8	Ret	17	17	19	11	12															5
24	(Germany) Peter Zakowski	20	13	30	DNS	17	15	22	14	17	14	DSQ	15	DNS	DNS	24	Ret	20	7	20	26	23	15	15	Ret	4
25	(Canada) Allen Berg					22	19	27	Ret	15	NC	DNS	Ret	29	17	28	21	19	8	22	Ret					3
26	(Germany) Volker Strycek			Ret	DNS	Ret	Ret	21	13	NC	13	DNQ	DNQ	14	9	Ret	DNS	16	11	Ret	23					2
27	(Germany) Armin Bernhard	28	21	Ret	22	Ret	DNS	31	24	25	18	DNS	19	20	Ret	Ret	DNS	22	9	26	28	Ret	Ret	20	20	2
28	(Germany) Ellen Lohr	13	Ret	27	15	13	10	16	Ret	13	Ret	DNQ	DNQ	13	21	14	10	11	Ret	Ret	DNS	14	11	Ret	12	2
29	(Germany) Leopold von Bayern	26	Ret	22	Ret	27	Ret	20	22			Ret	DNS	19	10	21	Ret	15	DNS	17	18					1
	(Germany) Frank Schmickler	22	12	13	11	12	Ret	11	11	Ret	DNS	23	Ret	Ret	Ret	23	22			Ret	25					0
	(Austria) Dieter Quester	24	Ret	15	27	Ret	DNS	18	Ret	14	17	15	12	Ret	DNS	16	Ret					19	12	13	Ret	0
	(Italy) Luca Maggiorelli			20	Ret	28	DNS	23	15	Ret	DNS	16	Ret	18	12	29	13	25	DNS	16	19					0
	(Netherlands) Cor Euser	18	19			20	Ret			Ret	DNS	21	13	17	Ret	22	20			21	14					0
	(Germany) Gerd Ruch					NC	NC	NC	25	Ret	21	DNQ	DNQ	DNS	DNS	Ret	DNS	DNS	13	28	Ret	26	17	DNS	21	0
	(Germany) Franz Engstler	Ret	16	29	Ret	21	18	Ret	DNS	15	Ret	DNQ	DNQ			17	Ret	Ret	Ret	Ret	20	24	14	Ret	18	0
	(Switzerland) Alain Menu																	19	14	15	16					0
	(Germany) Markus Oestreich											19	14													0
	(Germany) Michael Schumacher											25	Ret	Ret	14											0
	(Germany) Kurt König	Ret	Ret	21	18	23	20	24	16	Ret	DNS	20	Ret	22	DNS	25	18	21	15	16	18	21	Ret	18	19	0
	(Germany) Ralf Kelleners	DSQ	DNS	17	16	19	23	DNS	DNS	23	DNS	22	Ret	26	Ret	30	DNS	Ret	DNS	25	21	22	Ret	19	17	0
	(Germany) Annette Meeuvissen	Ret	23	31	25	25	22	30	18	NC	16	DNS	16	24	15	31	Ret	Ret	DNS	23	32					0
	(Germany) Günter Murmann							29	Ret			Ret	Ret									25	16			0
	(Germany) Klaus Niedzwiedz	Ret	DNS	24	19	Ret	21	28	17	Ret	Ret	Ret	DNS	25	20	Ret	DNS	Ret	DNS	17	24	Ret	DNS	17	Ret	0
	(Germany) Harald Becker	29	22	25	28	26	24	Ret	DNS	21	19	Ret	17			26	23	Ret	DNS	Ret	27					0
	(Germany) Manuel Reuter															20	17									0
	(Germany) Fred Räker					Ret	25			Ret	Ret	DNQ	DNQ	DNS	DNS	Ret	Ret	DNS	17					22	Ret	0
	(Austria) Sepp Haider													Ret	19											0
	(Germany) Michael Ickenstein	20	Ret																							0
	(Germany) Franz Dufter			NC	21																					0
	(Germany) Jochen Mass	Ret	DNS							Ret	DNS			Ret	23											0
	(Czechoslovakia) Josef Venc																					27	Ret			0
	(Germany) Jürgen Ruch					Ret	DNS																			0
	(Germany) Heinz Becker							DNS	DNS	DNS	DNS															0
Pos.	Driver	ZOL (Belgium)		HOC1 (Germany)		NÜR1 (Germany)		AVU (Germany)		WUN (Germany)		NOR (Germany)		DIE (Germany)		NÜR2 (Germany)		ALE (Germany)		HOC2 (Germany)		BRN (Czechoslovakia)		DON (United Kingdom)		Pts.

DTM race
ITR race, non-DTM championship race

== Bibliography ==
- Knupp, Willy (1991). Rennreport '91: Formel 1, DTM, Sportwagen (in German). Stuttgart: Motorbuch Verlag. ISBN 978-3-613-01413-8.
- Voigt, Thomas; Bock, Friedemann (1991). Tourenwagen Story '91: Die Rennen, die Fahrer, die Technik (in German). Hamburg: tsv top special Verlag.
