= Kurt Thiim =

Danish racing driver (born 1956)

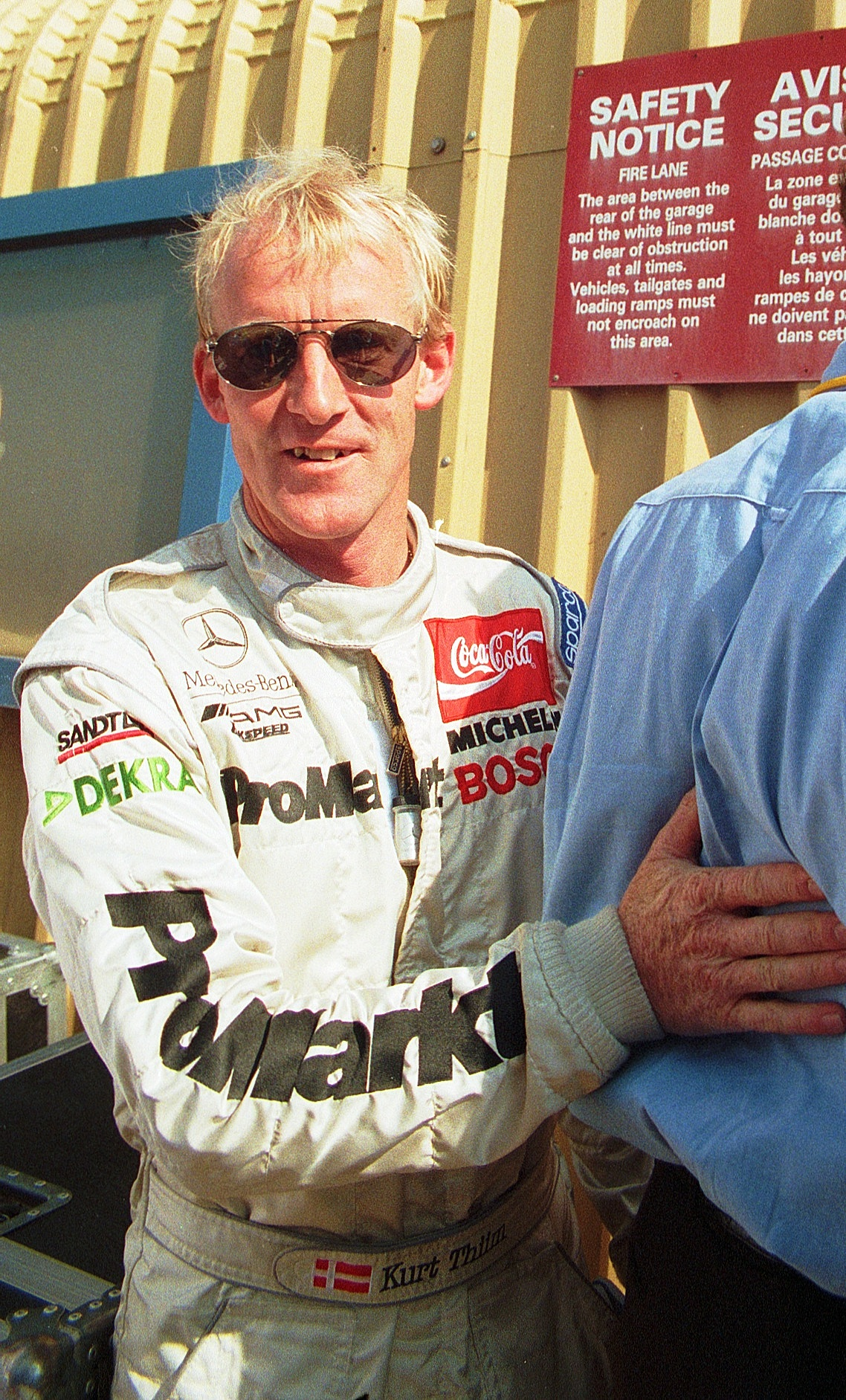
Kurt Thiim in 1995.

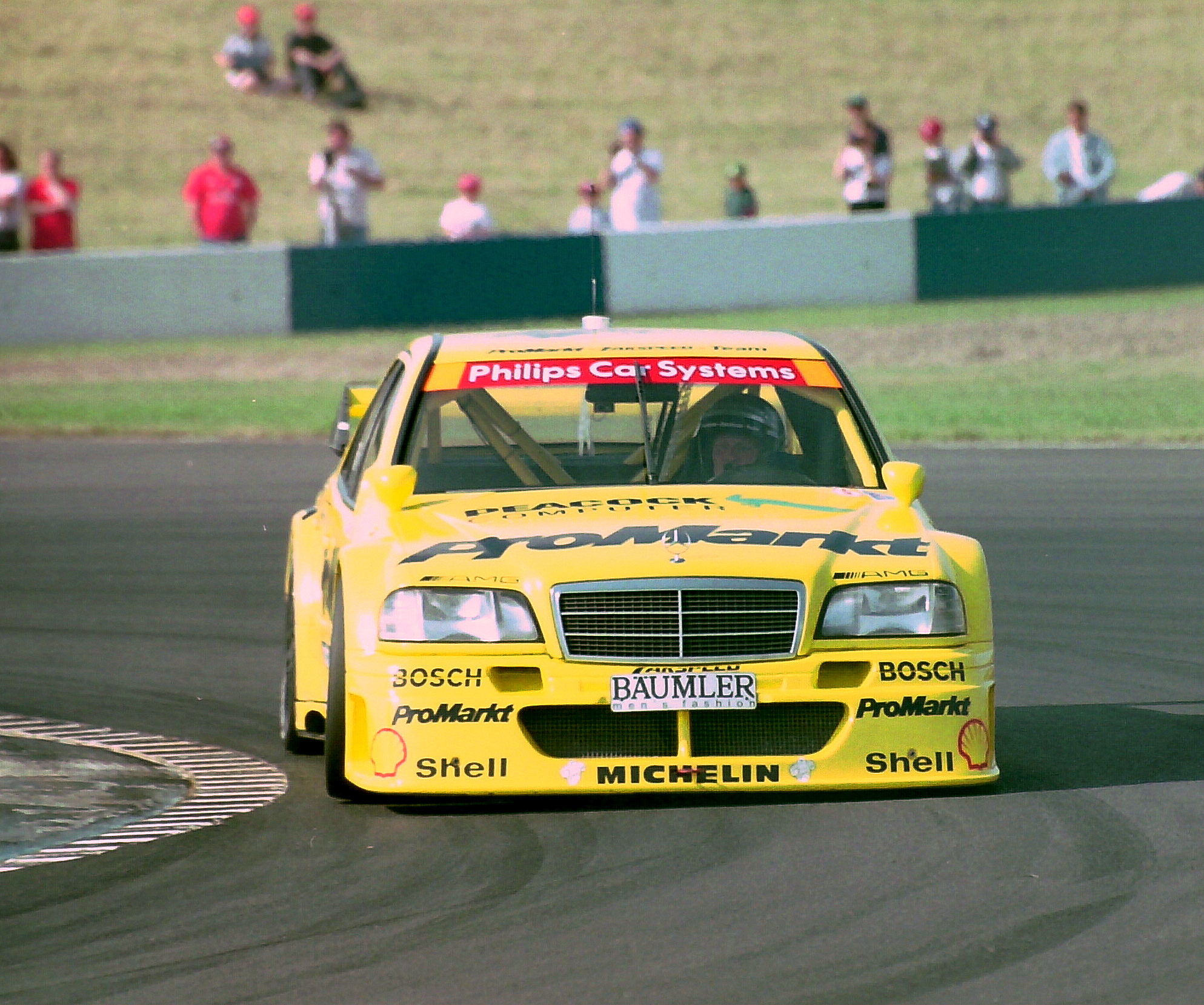
Kurt Thiim - Promarkt-Zakspeed Team - AMG-Mercedes C-Klasse at Melbourne Hairpin, 1994 DTM Donington Park.

Kurt Thiim (born 3 August 1956 in Vojens) is a Danish racing driver. After his karting career, he raced in single-seaters from 1978 to 1984 before moving to the DTM. He won the championship in his debut year in 1986 driving a Rover Vitesse, and raced an Alfa Romeo 75 in 1987. Despite not winning a second title, he remained one of the series' top drivers for the next decade as a Mercedes-Benz driver. He joined the AMG team in 1988, then Zakspeed in 1992, and returned to AMG in 1996, resulting runner-up in 1992, third in 1990, fourth in 1989 and 1995, fifth in 1994, and sixth in 1993. He collected 19 wins during his DTM career.

After the series was discontinued after 1996, Thiim raced in several other touring car categories, including the German Supertouring Championship and the Danish Touring Car Championship, where he won a title in 2002.

Thiim is the father of racing driver Nicki Thiim.

== Racing record ==
=== Complete Deutsche Tourenwagen Meisterschaft results ===
(key) (Races in bold indicate pole position) (Races in italics indicate fastest lap)

Year	Team	Car	1	2	3	4	5	6	7	8	9	10	11	12	13	14	15	16	17	18	19	20	21	22	23	24	Pos.	Pts
1986	ATN Autotechnik Nickel	Rover Vitesse	ZOL; 1	**HOC**; Ret	NÜR; 2	AVU; 4	MFA; 3	WUN; 1	NÜR; 1	ZOL; 13	NÜR; 4																1st	130
1987	ATN Autotechnik Nickel	Rover Vitesse	HOC; 8																								22nd	31
1987	ATN Autotechnik Nickel	Alfa Romeo 75 Turbo		ZOL; 8	NÜR; 23	AVU	MFA; 26	NOR; 10	NÜR; 21	WUN; Ret	DIE; Ret	SAL; Ret															22nd	31
1988	MK Motorsport	BMW M3	ZOL; 1	ZOL; 2	HOC; 1	HOC; 2	NÜR; 1; 1	NÜR; 2; 3	BRN; 1; 15	BRN; 2 Ret	AVU; 1	AVU; 2	MFA; 1; 25	MFA; 2 Ret	NÜR; 1	NÜR; 2											18th	111
1988	AMG Motorenbau GmbH	Mercedes 190E 2.3-16															NOR; 1; 4	NOR; 2; 5	WUN; 1 Ret	WUN; 2; 11	SAL; 1	SAL; 2	HUN; 1; 2	HUN; 2; 3	HOC; 1 Ret	HOC; 2 DSQ	18th	111
1989	AMG Motorenbau GmbH	Mercedes 190E 2.3-16	ZOL; 1; 5	ZOL; 2; 8	HOC; 1; 7	HOC; 2; 6	NÜR; 1; 6	NÜR; 2; 13	MFA; 1; 5	MFA; 2; 1	AVU; 1; 6	AVU; 2; 7															4th	237
1989	AMG Motorenbau GmbH	Mercedes 190E 2.5-16 Evo											NÜR; 1 Ret	NÜR; 2; 5	NOR; 1; 1	NOR; 2 Ret	HOC; 1; 2	HOC; 2; 6	DIE; 1 Ret	DIE; 2 DNS	NÜR; 1; 2	NÜR; 2; 4	HOC; 1; 8	HOC; 2; 19			4th	237
1990	AMG Motorenbau GmbH	Mercedes 190E 2.5-16 Evo	**ZOL**; **1**; 1	**ZOL**; **2**; 1	HOC; 1; 3	HOC; 2; 3	NÜR; 1; 17	NÜR; 2; 7	AVU; 1; 6	AVU; 2; 6	MFA; 1; 5	MFA; 2; 5	WUN; 1; 7	WUN; 2; 7		NÜR; 2; 7											3rd	162
1990	AMG Motorenbau GmbH	Mercedes 190E 2.5-16 Evo2													NÜR; 1 Ret		NOR; 1 Ret	NOR; 2; 12	DIE; 1; 1	DIE; 2; 16	NÜR; 1; 4	NÜR; 2; 5	HOC; 1; 4	HOC; 2; 6			3rd	162
1991	AMG Motorenbau GmbH	Mercedes 190E 2.5-16 Evo2	ZOL; 1; 4	ZOL; 2; 4	HOC; 1; 6	HOC; 2; 4	**NÜR**; **1** Ret	NÜR; 2; 9	AVU; 1; 13	AVU; 2 Ret	WUN; 1; 12	WUN; 2 Ret	NOR; 1; 1	NOR; 2; 2	DIE; 1; 9	DIE; 2 Ret	NÜR; 1; 27	NÜR; 2; 7	ALE; 1; 2	ALE; 2 Ret	HOC; 1; 8	HOC; 2; 11	BRN; 1; 4	BRN; 2; 4	DON; 1; 10	DON; 2 Ret	8th	97
1992	Diebels Zakspeed Team	Mercedes 190E 2.5-16 Evo2	**ZOL**; **1**; 1	**ZOL**; **2**; 1	**NÜR**; **1**; 4	NÜR; 2; 2	WUN; 1; 3	WUN; 2; 5	AVU; 1; 7	AVU; 2; 21	HOC; 1 Ret	HOC; 2; 4	NÜR; 1; 5	NÜR; 2; 5	NOR; 1 Ret	NOR; 2; 9	**BRN**; **1** Ret	BRN; 2 Ret	DIE; 1; 4	DIE; 2; 3	ALE; 1; 2	ALE; 2; 2	NÜR; 1; 5	NÜR; 2 Ret	**HOC**; **1**; 2	HOC; 2 Ret	2nd	192
1993	Diebels Zakspeed Team	Mercedes 190E 2.5-16 Evo2	ZOL; 1; 8	ZOL; 2; 6																							6th	138
1993	Diebels Zakspeed Team	Mercedes 190E 2.5-16 93			HOC; 1; 3	HOC; 2; 5	NÜR; 1; 5	NÜR; 2; 5	WUN; 1; 3	WUN; 2; 1	NÜR; 1; 9	NÜR; 2 Ret	**NOR**; **1**; 8	NOR; 2 Ret	DON; 1; 2	DON; 2; 4	DIE; 1; 5	DIE; 2; 8	ALE; 1; 7	ALE; 2; 5	AVU; 1; 10	AVU; 2; 4	**HOC**; **1**; 3	HOC; 2; 4			6th	138
1994	Promarkt-Zakspeed-Team	Mercedes C-Class V6	ZOL; 1; 6	ZOL; 2 Ret	**HOC**; **1**; 1	**HOC**; **2**; 2	NÜR; 1; 9	NÜR; 2; 10	**MUG**; **1**; 1	**MUG**; **2** Ret	**NÜR**; **1**; 21	NÜR; 2; 6	NOR; 1; 4	NOR; 2; 3	**DON**; **1**; 7	DON; 2; 3	DIE; 1; 4	DIE; 2; 6	NÜR; 1; 11	NÜR; 2; 6	**AVU**; **1**; 2	AVU; 2; 3	ALE; 1 Ret	ALE; 2 Ret	**HOC**; **1**; 1	**HOC**; **2** Ret	5th	141
1995	Zakspeed Mercedes	Mercedes C-Class V6	HOC; 1 Ret	HOC; 2; 5	**AVU**; **1**; 1	**AVU**; **2**; 1	NOR; 1 Ret	NOR; 2 DNS	DIE; 1 Ret	DIE; 2 DNS	NÜR; 1 Ret	NÜR; 2; 4	ALE; 1; 1	**ALE**; **2**; 1	HOC; 1; 19	HOC; 2; 11											4th	78

=== Complete International Touring Car Championship results ===
(key) (Races in bold indicate pole position) (Races in italics indicate fastest lap)

Year	Team	Car	1	2	3	4	5	6	7	8	9	10	11	12	13	14	15	16	17	18	19	20	21	22	23	24	25	26	Pos.	Pts
1995	Zakspeed Mercedes	Mercedes C-Class V6	MUG; 1 Ret	MUG; 2; 4	HEL; 1 Ret	HEL; 2; 6	DON; 1; 3	DON; 2; 4	EST; 1; 6	EST; 2; 16	MAG; 1; 10	MAG; 2 Ret																	8th	45
1996	UPS Mercedes-AMG	Mercedes C-Class	HOC; 1; 12	HOC; 2; 8	NÜR; 1; 8	NÜR; 2; 12†	EST; 1 DNS	EST; 2 DNS	HEL; 1; 18†	HEL; 2 Ret	NOR; 1 Ret	NOR; 2 Ret	DIE; 1; 14	DIE; 2; 11	SIL; 1 Ret	SIL; 2; 10	NÜR; 1; 10	NÜR; 2 Ret	MAG; 1; 11	MAG; 2; 10	MUG; 1; 8	MUG; 2; 4	HOC; 1; 10	HOC; 2 Ret	INT; 1	INT; 2	SUZ; 1	SUZ; 2	18th	23

- † — Retired, but was classified as he completed 90% of the winner's race distance.

=== Complete Super Tourenwagen Cup results ===
(key) (Races in bold indicate pole position) (Races in italics indicate fastest lap)

Year	Team	Car	1	2	3	4	5	6	7	8	9	10	11	12	13	14	15	16	17	18	19	20	Pos.	Pts
1997	Opel Team Zakspeed	Opel Vectra	HOC; 1 Ret	HOC; 2; 19	ZOL; 1; 24	ZOL; 2; 13	NÜR; 1	NÜR; 2	SAC; 1; 20	SAC; 2; 20	NOR; 1; 20	NOR; 2; 11	WUN; 1; 4	WUN; 2; 4	ZWE; 1 Ret	ZWE; 2 DNS	SAL; 1; 9	SAL; 2; 13	REG; 1; 8	REG; 2; 5	NÜR; 1; 9	NÜR; 2 Ret	18th	180

=== Complete 24 Hours of Le Mans results ===
Year	Team	Co-Drivers	Car	Class	Laps	Pos.	Class Pos.
1991	(Germany) Team Sauber Mercedes	(United Kingdom) Jonathan Palmer (Sweden) Stanley Dickens	Mercedes-Benz C11	C2	223	DNF	DNF

=== Britcar 24 Hour results ===
Year	Team	Co-Drivers	Car	Car No.	Class	Laps	Pos.	Class Pos.
2007	(United Kingdom) RJN Motorsport	(United Kingdom) Alex Buncombe (United Kingdom) Owen Mildenhall (United Kingdom) Anthony Reid	Nissan 350Z	40	GTC	50	23rd	8th

Sporting positions
Preceded by Franz Konrad	German Formula Three champion 1984	Succeeded by Volker Weidler
