= Frank Jelinski =

German racing driver (born 1958)

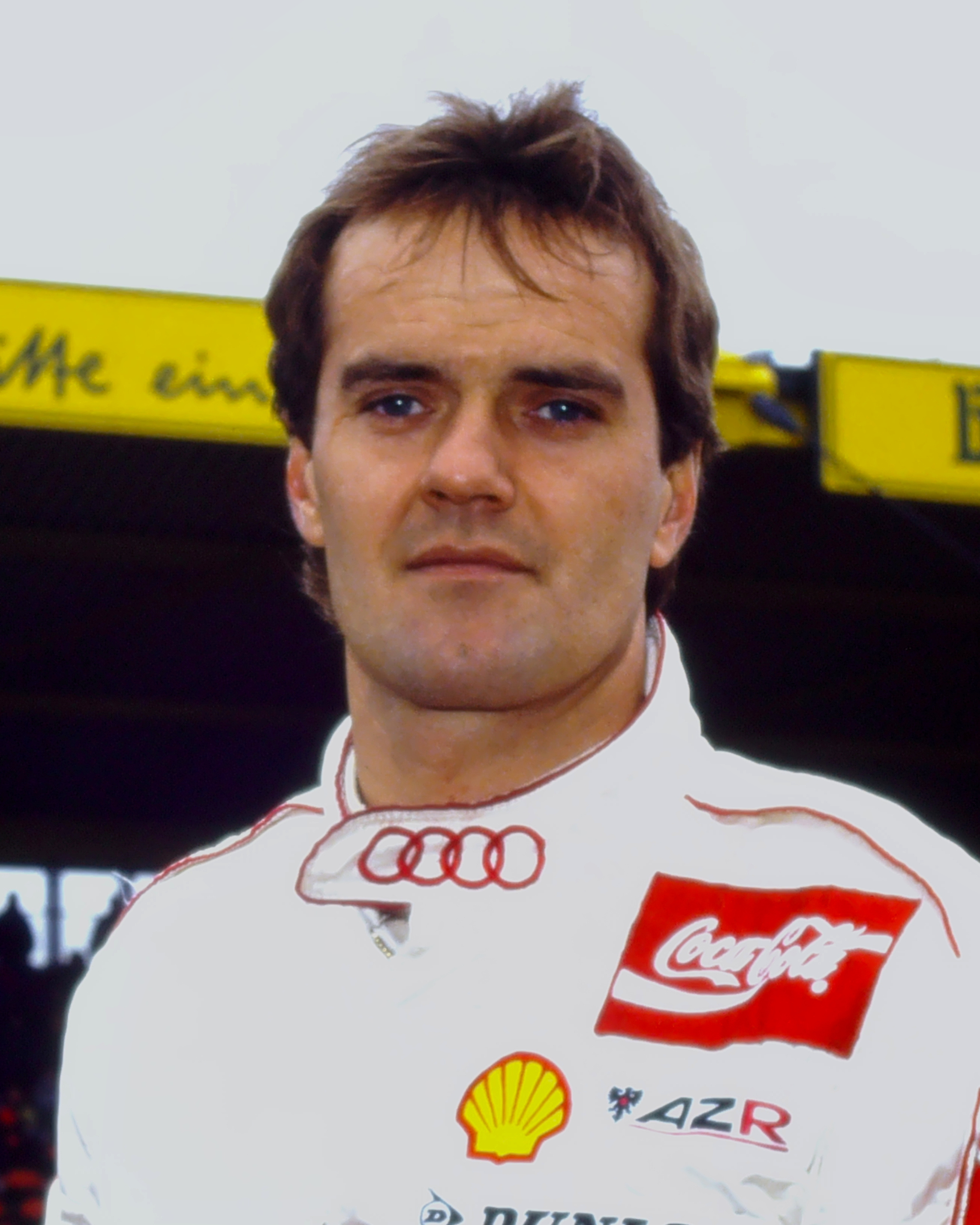
Frank Jelinski with Audi Sport for the 1992 DTM

Frank Jelinski (born 23 May 1958 in Bad Münder am Deister) is a German former racing driver.

== Career ==
After karting, Jelinski moved to the German Formula Three Championship in 1978 and European Formula Super Vee in 1979 finishing fourth. In 1980, he won the German F3 championship and finished 13th in the European championship. He repeated his German F3 championship in 1981. He moved to Formula Two in 1982 and finished 12th. In 1983, he made four F2 starts and began a transition to sports cars that would last the rest of his career. In 1984, he made six World Sportscar Championship starts and two DTM starts. He captured his first World Sportscar Championship win in 1986 driving for Brun Motorsport and moved to Joest Racing in 1987. He continued with Joest until the 1991 24 Hours of Daytona, which he won with teammates Hurley Haywood, "John Winter", Henri Pescarolo, and Bob Wollek. He moved to DTM full-time that year driving an AZR Audi to tenth in points. He retired from full-time racing in 1992, but returned for the 24 Hours of Le Mans every year until 1995, and has since occasionally come out of retirement for one-off appearances.

== Racing record ==
=== Complete European Formula Two Championship results ===
(key)

Year	Entrant	Chassis	Engine	1	2	3	4	5	6	7	8	9	10	11	12	13	Pos.	Pts
1982	Bertram Schäfer Racing	Maurer MM82	BMW	SIL; 17	HOC; 8	THR; 9	NÜR; 7	MUG; 11	VAL; Ret	PAU; 4	SPA; 11	HOC; 5	DON; Ret	MAN; Ret	PER; 5	MIS; 10	12th	7
1983	Bertram Schäfer Racing	Maurer MM82	BMW	SIL; Ret	THR; 6	HOC	NÜR; 8	VAL	PAU	JAR	DON	MIS	PER				20th	1
1983	Maurer Motorsport	Maurer MM83	BMW											ZOL; Ret	MUG		20th	1

=== 24 Hours of Le Mans results ===
Year	Team	Co-Drivers	Car	Class	Laps	Pos.	Class Pos.
1983	(Germany) Porsche Kremer Racing	(France) Patrick Gaillard (United Kingdom) Derek Warwick	Porsche-Kremer CK5	C	76	DNF	DNF
1985	(Germany) Team Labatt	(Canada) John Graham (United Kingdom) Nick Adams	Gebhardt JC853-Ford Cosworth	C2	224	NC	NC
1986	(Switzerland) Brun Motorsport	(Switzerland) Walter Brun (Italy) Massimo Sigala	Porsche 962C	C1	75	DNF	DNF
1987	(Germany) Joest Racing	(United States) Hurley Haywood (Sweden) Stanley Dickens	Porsche 962C	C1	7	DNF	DNF
1988	(Germany) Blaupunkt Joest Racing	(Sweden) Stanley Dickens (Germany) Louis Krages	Porsche 962C	C1	385	**3rd**	**3rd**
1989	(Germany) Joest Racing	(France) Pierre-Henri Raphanel (Germany) Louis Krages	Porsche 962C	C1	124	DNF	DNF
1990	(Germany) Joest Porsche Racing	(Germany) Hans-Joachim Stuck (United Kingdom) Derek Bell	Porsche 962C	C1	350	4th	4th
1991	(Austria) Konrad Motorsport (Germany) Joest Porsche Racing	(Germany) Hans-Joachim Stuck (United Kingdom) Derek Bell	Porsche 962C	C1	347	7th	7th
1993	(Germany) Joest Porsche Racing	(Germany) Manuel Reuter (Germany) John Winter	Porsche 962C	C2	282	DNF	DNF
1994	(United States) Callaway Sport Inc.	(United States) Boris Said (France) Michel Maisonneuve	Callaway Corvette SuperNatural	GT2	142	DSQ	DSQ
1995	(United States) Callaway Sport Inc.	(Italy) Enrico Bertaggia (United States) Johnny Unser	Callaway Corvette	LMGT2	273	9th	**2nd**

=== Complete Deutsche Tourenwagen Meisterschaft results ===
(key) (Races in bold indicate pole position; races in italics indicate fastest lap.)

Year	Team	Car	1	2	3	4	5	6	7	8	9	10	11	12	13	14	15	16	17	18	19	20	21	22	23	24	Pos.	Pts
1984	Fischhaber-Racing	Alfa Romeo Alfetta GTV6	ZOL; 11	HOC	AVU	AVU	MFA	WUN	NÜR	NÜR	NOR	NÜR	DIE	HOC	HOC	ZOL											25th	18
1984	Liqui Moly Equipe	BMW 635 CSi															NÜR; 11										25th	18
1990	Schmidt Motorsport Technik	Audi V8 Quattro	ZOL; 1	ZOL; 2	HOC; 1	HOC; 2	NÜR; 1	NÜR; 2	AVU; 1	AVU; 2	MFA; 1	MFA; 2	WUN; 1	WUN; 2	NÜR; 1	NÜR; 2	NOR; 1	NOR; 2	DIE; 1	DIE; 2	NÜR; 1	NÜR; 2	**HOC**; **1**; 2	HOC; 2; 2			18th	30
1991	Audi Zentrum Reutlingen	Audi V8 Quattro Evo	ZOL; 1; 17	ZOL; 2; 10	HOC; 1; 12	HOC; 2; 6	NÜR; 1; 11	NÜR; 2; 8	AVU; 1; 3	AVU; 2 Ret	WUN; 1 Ret	WUN; 2 Ret	NOR; 1; 7	NOR; 2; 5	DIE; 1; 21	DIE; 2 Ret	NÜR; 1 Ret	NÜR; 2 Ret	ALE; 1; 4	ALE; 2; 3	HOC; 1; 2	HOC; 2; 3	BRN; 1; 16	BRN; 2; 6	DON; 1; 6	DON; 2; 16	10th	83
1992	Audi Zentrum Reutlingen	Audi V8 Quattro Evo	ZOL; 1; 15	ZOL; 2 Ret	NÜR; 1; 3	NÜR; 2; 11	WUN; 1; 12	WUN; 2; 13	AVU; 1 Ret	AVU; 2 DNS	HOC; 1 Ret	HOC; 2; 12	NÜR; 1 Ret	NÜR; 2 Ret	NOR; 1	NOR; 2	BRN; 1	BRN; 2	DIE; 1	DIE; 2	ALE; 1	ALE; 2	NÜR; 1	NÜR; 2	HOC; 1	HOC; 2	19th	12

Sporting positions
Preceded by Michael Korten	German Formula Three champion 1980-1981	Succeeded by John Nielsen
