= 1992 Deutsche Tourenwagen Meisterschaft =

German touring car championship season

Seasons
- ← 1991 1993 →

The 1992 Deutsche Tourenwagen Meisterschaft was the ninth season of premier German touring car championship and also seventh season under the moniker of Deutsche Tourenwagen Meisterschaft. The season had twelve rounds with two races each; additional two rounds were held in Belgium and Czechoslovakia.

On 24 May at Hockenheimring, Ellen Lohr became DTM's first (and to date, only) female driver to win a race.

== Entry list ==
Manufacturer	Vehicle	Team	No.	Drivers	Events
Audi	V8 quattro Evolution	Audi Zentrum Reutlingen	1	(Germany) Frank Biela	1–6
Audi	V8 quattro Evolution	Audi Zentrum Reutlingen	2	(Germany) Frank Jelinski	1–6
Audi	V8 quattro Evolution	Schmidt Motorsport	44	(Germany) Hans-Joachim Stuck	1–6
Audi	V8 quattro Evolution	Schmidt Motorsport	45	(Germany) Hubert Haupt	1–5
BMW	M3 Sport Evolution	Schnitzer Motorsport	7	(Venezuela) Johnny Cecotto	All
BMW	M3 Sport Evolution	Schnitzer Motorsport	14	(Germany) Joachim Winkelhock	All
BMW	M3 Sport Evolution	Schnitzer Motorsport	15	(Italy) Roberto Ravaglia	All
BMW	M3 Sport Evolution	Schnitzer Motorsport	16	(Germany) Altfrid Heger	All
BMW	M3 Sport Evolution	Scuderia Bigazzi	9	(Italy) Emanuele Pirro	All
BMW	M3 Sport Evolution	Scuderia Bigazzi	10	(United Kingdom) Steve Soper	1–10, 12
BMW	M3 Sport Evolution	Scuderia Bigazzi	22	(France) Olivier Grouillard	11
BMW	M3 Sport Evolution	Linder Rennsport	19	(Germany) Armin Hahne	All
BMW	M3 Sport Evolution	Linder Rennsport	20	(Australia) Wayne Gardner	11–12
BMW	M3 Sport Evolution	Unitron Sports	21	(Denmark) Kris Nissen	1–8
BMW	M3 Sport Evolution	Isert Motorsport	21	(Denmark) Kris Nissen	10, 12
BMW	M3 Sport Evolution	Isert Motorsport	30	(Germany) Leopold von Bayern	All
BMW	M3 Sport Evolution	Valier Motorsport	35	(Germany) Alexander Burgstaller	9
BMW	M3 Sport Evolution	Valier Motorsport	36	(Germany) Franz Engstler	All
BMW	M3 Sport Evolution	MM Team	37	(Germany) Thomas von Löwis	1–4
BMW	M3 Sport Evolution	MM Team	38	(Germany) Fritz Kreutzpointner	All
BMW	M3 Sport Evolution	MM Team	57	(Germany) Thomas Winkelhock	5
BMW	M3 Sport Evolution	VAC	40	(Czech Republic) Josef Venc	8
BMW	M3 Sport Evolution	Auto Maass	42	(Germany) Harald Becker	2–12
BMW	M3 Sport Evolution	Tauber Motorsport	46	(Germany) Franz Dufter	7, 9
BMW	M3 Sport Evolution	Tauber Motorsport	48	(Germany) Siegfried Maier	4–5
BMW	M3 Sport Evolution	Václav Bervid	49	(Czech Republic) Václav Bervid	8–12
BMW	M3 Sport Evolution	BMW Sweden	50	(Sweden) Per-Gunnar Andersson	7, 9
Ford	Mustang Mk.3	Gerd Ruch Motorsport	33	(Germany) Gerd Ruch	All
Ford	Mustang Mk.3	Gerd Ruch Motorsport	34	(Germany) Fred Räker	1–4, 6–7
Ford	Mustang Mk.3	Gerd Ruch Motorsport	66	(Germany) Jürgen Ruch	8, 12
Ford	Mustang Mk.3	Challenger Racing GmbH	51	(Germany) Jürgen Feucht	1–2, 4, 9–10, 12
Mercedes-Benz	190E 2.5 Evo2	AMG Motorenbau GmbH	3	(Germany) Klaus Ludwig	All
Mercedes-Benz	190E 2.5 Evo2	AMG Motorenbau GmbH	4	(Germany) Bernd Schneider	All
Mercedes-Benz	190E 2.5 Evo2	AMG Motorenbau GmbH	5	(Germany) Ellen Lohr	All
Mercedes-Benz	190E 2.5 Evo2	AMG Motorenbau GmbH	6	(Finland) Keke Rosberg	All
Mercedes-Benz	190E 2.5 Evo2	MS Racing	11	(France) Jacques Laffite	All
Mercedes-Benz	190E 2.5 Evo2	MS Racing	12	(Germany) Jörg van Ommen	All
Mercedes-Benz	190E 2.5 Evo2	Zakspeed	17	(Germany) Roland Asch	All
Mercedes-Benz	190E 2.5 Evo2	Zakspeed	18	(Denmark) Kurt Thiim	All
Mercedes-Benz	190E 2.5 Evo2	Zakspeed	28	(Germany) "John Winter"	9–12
Mercedes-Benz	190E 2.5 Evo2	BAS Reifen Autotechnik	27	(Germany) Armin Bernhard	1–7, 9–12
Mercedes-Benz	190E 2.5 Evo2	Manthey Racing	55	(Germany) Olaf Manthey	6, 9–10
Opel	Omega A 3000 Evo500	Irmscher Motorsport	26	(Germany) Volker Strycek	6

== Schedule and results ==
Round		Country	Circuit	Date	Pole position	Fastest lap	Winning driver	Winning team	Report
1	R1	Belgium	Zolder	5 April	(Denmark) Kurt Thiim	(Germany) Klaus Ludwig	(Denmark) Kurt Thiim	Zakspeed	Report
1	R2	Belgium	Zolder	5 April		(Germany) Klaus Ludwig	(Denmark) Kurt Thiim	Zakspeed	Report
2	R1	Germany	Nürburgring	19 April	(Denmark) Kurt Thiim	(Finland) Keke Rosberg	(Germany) Frank Biela	Audi Zentrum Reutlingen	Report
2	R2	Germany	Nürburgring	19 April		(Germany) Roland Asch	(Germany) Roland Asch	Zakspeed	Report
3	R1	Germany	Wunstorf	3 May	(Germany) Frank Biela	(Italy) Roberto Ravaglia	(Germany) Jörg van Ommen	Mass-Schons	Report
3	R2	Germany	Wunstorf	3 May		(Finland) Keke Rosberg	(Finland) Keke Rosberg	AMG-Mercedes	Report
4	R1	Germany	AVUS	10 May	(Germany) Frank Biela	(France) Jacques Laffite	(United Kingdom) Steve Soper	Bigazzi	Report
4	R2	Germany	AVUS	10 May		(Germany) Bernd Schneider	(Germany) Bernd Schneider	AMG-Mercedes	Report
5	R1	Germany	Hockenheimring	24 May	(Germany) Klaus Ludwig	(Germany) Ellen Lohr	(Germany) Ellen Lohr	AMG-Mercedes	Report
5	R2	Germany	Hockenheimring	24 May		(Germany) Bernd Schneider	(Germany) Roland Asch	Zakspeed	Report
6	R1	Germany	Nürburgring	18 June	(Venezuela) Johnny Cecotto	(Germany) Klaus Ludwig	(Germany) Klaus Ludwig	AMG-Mercedes	Report
6	R2	Germany	Nürburgring	18 June		(Venezuela) Johnny Cecotto	(Germany) Klaus Ludwig	AMG-Mercedes	Report
7	R1	Germany	Norisring	28 June	(Germany) Roland Asch	(Italy) Emanuele Pirro	(Germany) Joachim Winkelhock	Schnitzer Motorsport	Report
7	R2	Germany	Norisring	28 June		(Finland) Keke Rosberg	(United Kingdom) Steve Soper	Bigazzi	Report
8	R1	Czechoslovakia	Brno	12 July	(Denmark) Kurt Thiim	(Germany) Bernd Schneider	(Venezuela) Johnny Cecotto	Fina Motorsport	Report
8	R2	Czechoslovakia	Brno	12 July		(Finland) Keke Rosberg	(Venezuela) Johnny Cecotto	Fina Motorsport	Report
9	R1	Germany	Diepholz Airfield Circuit	16 August	(Germany) Klaus Ludwig	(Germany) Klaus Ludwig	(Germany) Klaus Ludwig	AMG-Mercedes	Report
9	R2	Germany	Diepholz Airfield Circuit	16 August		(Germany) Bernd Schneider	(Germany) Klaus Ludwig	AMG-Mercedes	Report
10	R1	Germany	Alemannenring	6 September	(Germany) Bernd Schneider	(Germany) Bernd Schneider	(Germany) Bernd Schneider	AMG-Mercedes	Report
10	R2	Germany	Alemannenring	6 September		(Germany) Bernd Schneider	(Germany) Bernd Schneider	AMG-Mercedes	Report
11	R1	Germany	Nürburgring	20 September	(Finland) Keke Rosberg	(Germany) Bernd Schneider	(Germany) Bernd Schneider	AMG-Mercedes	Report
11	R2	Germany	Nürburgring	20 September		(Germany) Klaus Ludwig	(Germany) Klaus Ludwig	AMG-Mercedes	Report
12	R1	Germany	Hockenheimring	11 October	(Denmark) Kurt Thiim	(Italy) Roberto Ravaglia	(Italy) Roberto Ravaglia	Schnitzer Motorsport	Report
12	R2	Germany	Hockenheimring	11 October		(Germany) Joachim Winkelhock	(Italy) Roberto Ravaglia	Schnitzer Motorsport	Report

== Championship standings ==
Points system
1st	2nd	3rd	4th	5th	6th	7th	8th	9th	10th
20	15	12	10	8	6	4	3	2	1

Pos	Driver	ZOL (Belgium)		NÜR (Germany)		WUN (Germany)		AVU (Germany)		HOC (Germany)		NORD (Germany)		NOR (Germany)		BRN (Czechoslovakia)		DIE (Germany)		SIN (Germany)		NÜR2 (Germany)		HOC2 (Germany)		Pts
1	(Germany) Klaus Ludwig	2	11	7	5	2	3	4	7	Ret	2	1	1	8	12	Ret	4	1	1	Ret	4	4	1	3	Ret	228
2	(Denmark) Kurt Thiim	1	1	4	2	3	5	7	21	Ret	4	5	5	Ret	9	Ret	Ret	4	3	2	2	5	Ret	2	Ret	192
3	(Germany) Bernd Schneider	5	Ret	10	Ret	7	4	3	1	2	Ret	4	4	Ret	4	7	Ret	2	Ret	1	1	1	3	Ret	Ret	191
4	(Venezuela) Johnny Cecotto	12	Ret	6	Ret	5	Ret	2	6	9	8	2	2	7	7	1	1	5	5	4	12	3	4	7	2	185
5	(Finland) Keke Rosberg	11	Ret	17	8	4	1	12	15	3	Ret	3	3	Ret	18	Ret	2	3	2	Ret	6	2	2	Ret	DNS	147
6	(Germany) Roland Asch	7	2	5	1	6	Ret	Ret	11	5	1	7	6	2	5	5	5	12	10	Ret	11	9	7	6	Ret	143
7	(Italy) Roberto Ravaglia	8	4	11	6	19	17	15	Ret	6	3	8	7	5	3	2	3	8	Ret	Ret	Ret	Ret	Ret	1	1	134
8	(Germany) Joachim Winkelhock	Ret	9	9	4	10	Ret	5	Ret	11	7	12	11	1	2	Ret	6	6	9	Ret	Ret	7	5	4	3	110
9	(United Kingdom) Steve Soper	4	13	Ret	7	23	Ret	1	9	4	5	6	8	4	1	Ret	Ret	Ret	7	5	7			19	Ret	109
10	(Germany) Jörg van Ommen	10	5	20	9	1	2	11	5	20	9	10	12	9	10	4	Ret	10	11	3	3	10	9	5	Ret	106
11	(Germany) Ellen Lohr	13	15	19	Ret	Ret	9	8	2	1	Ret	13	13	3	6	Ret	7	7	4	8	5	6	6	Ret	6	105
12	(Italy) Emanuele Pirro	6	3	14	3	Ret	16	23	3	10	Ret	21	10	6	8	3	Ret	Ret	Ret	6	10	Ret	8	9	5	85
13	(France) Jacques Laffite	9	14	18	10	8	6	9	4	7	6	11	9	11	11	Ret	13	18	8	10	8	Ret	Ret	Ret	DNS	43
14	(Germany) Altfrid Heger	Ret	7	8	13	13	8	14	Ret	8	Ret	9	22	10	Ret	8	9	9	6	11	9	8	10	8	Ret	38
15	(Germany) Frank Biela	3	Ret	1	18	DSQ	DSQ	Ret	8	21	14	14	15													35
16	(Germany) Franz Engstler	17	8	15	Ret	14	10	Ret	10	Ret	Ret	22	Ret	13	Ret	6	8	13	12	9	Ret	15	11	11	4	26
17	(Denmark) Kris Nissen	14	6	13	17	9	7	13	Ret	14	10	Ret	DNS	12	13	9	11			7	13			10	7	24
18	(Germany) Hans-Joachim Stuck	Ret	Ret	2	12	11	Ret	6	Ret	19	Ret	23	Ret													21
19	(Germany) Frank Jelinski	15	Ret	3	11	12	13	Ret	DNS	Ret	12	Ret	Ret													12
20	(Germany) Harald Becker			21	20	17	15	19	13	15	NC	17	18	17	16	Ret	DNS	21	Ret	12	Ret	16	16	Ret	8	3
21	(Germany) Armin Bernhard	Ret	DNS	24	Ret	16	12	21	16	16	Ret	18	20	16	Ret			20	14	Ret	14	19	15	14	9	2
	(Germany) Armin Hahne	Ret	10	16	15	18	Ret	16	Ret	12	Ret	Ret	16	14	Ret	Ret	10	11	Ret	13	Ret	12	12	12	Ret	2
23	(Germany) Gerd Ruch	21	DNS	Ret	Ret	22	Ret	22	20	17	16	20	DNS	20	Ret	11	Ret	19	Ret	15	Ret	17	Ret	NC	10	1
	(Germany) Hubert Haupt	16	Ret	12	14	15	Ret	10	Ret	Ret	DNS															1
	(Germany) Leopold von Bayern	18	Ret	25	Ret	20	14	18	14	Ret	13	16	17	Ret	15	10	14	Ret	Ret	Ret	DNS	13	14	15	Ret	1
26	(Germany) Fritz Kreutzpointner	19	12	22	16	21	11	17	12	13	11	Ret	19	15	Ret	14	12	14	Ret	Ret	DNS	Ret	DNS	13	11	0
	(France) Olivier Grouillard																					11	13			0
	(Czechoslovakia) Josef Venc															12	16									0
	(Germany) Olaf Manthey											15	14					15	13	DNS	DNS					0
	(Czechoslovakia) Vaclav Bervid															13	15	Ret	18	Ret	DNS	18	Ret	Ret	Ret	0
	(Germany) "John Winter"																	17	17	14	15	Ret	DNS	17	Ret	0
	(Australia) Wayne Gardner																					14	Ret	16	Ret	0
	(Sweden) Peggen Andersson													19	14			Ret	Ret							0
	(Germany) Franz Dufter													18	17			16	15							0
	(Germany) Siegfried Maier							24	18	18	15															0
	(Germany) Alexander Burgstaller																	Ret	16							0
	(Germany) Fred Räker	20	NC	26	NC	DNS	DNS	Ret	17			19	21	Ret	Ret											0
	(Germany) Jürgen Ruch															Ret	DNS							18	Ret	0
	(Germany) Thomas von Löwis	Ret	DNS	23	19	Ret	DNS	20	19																	0
	(Germany) Jürgen Feucht	Ret	Ret	Ret	DNS			Ret	DNS									Ret	Ret	Ret	DNS			Ret	DNS	0
	(Germany) Volker Strycek											DNS	DNS													0
	(Germany) Thomas Winkelhock									DNS	DNS															0
Pos	Driver	ZOL (Belgium)		NÜR (Germany)		WUN (Germany)		AVU (Germany)		HOC (Germany)		NORD (Germany)		NOR (Germany)		BRN (Czechoslovakia)		DIE (Germany)		SIN (Germany)		NÜR2 (Germany)		HOC2 (Germany)		Pts

== Bibliography ==
- Voigt, Thomas; Bock, Friedemann (December 1992). Tourenwagen Story '92: Die Rennen, die Fahrer, die Technik (in German). Hamburg: tsv top special Verlag.
- Knupp, Willy (1992). Grand Prix '92: Live – Formel 1 und DTM (in German). Düsseldorf: Zeitgeist Verlag. ISBN 978-3-926972-23-1.
- Robert Weber (March 2023). Automobilsport Racing / History / Passion #35: The 1992 DTM Season. Sportfahrer Verlag. ISSN 2199-126X.
