= 1990 Deutsche Tourenwagen Meisterschaft =

German touring car championship season

Seasons
- ← 1989 1991 →

The 1990 Deutsche Tourenwagen Meisterschaft was the seventh season of premier German touring car championship and also fifth season under the moniker of Deutsche Tourenwagen Meisterschaft. The season had twelve rounds with two races each. It was the first season that all Deutsche Tourenwagen Meisterschaft cars mandatory used the naturally-aspirated engines as turbocharged engines had been banned at the end of 1989 for a few reasons; the governing body did not want a single car to dominate (as per other touring car championships around the world) and manufacturers would not be required to develop turbocharged engines to be competitive which would significantly increase costs due to the homologation requirements at the time.

The champion was Hans-Joachim Stuck.

== Teams and drivers ==
No.	Driver	Team	Car	Notes
1	(Italy) Roberto Ravaglia	Schnitzer Motorsport	BMW M3 Sport Evolution	Rounds 15-16
2	(France) Fabien Giroix	Schnitzer Motorsport	BMW M3 Sport Evolution	
3	(Venezuela) Johnny Cecotto	Schnitzer Motorsport	BMW M3 Sport Evolution	
4	(Germany) Klaus Niedzwiedz	Irmscher	Opel Omega 3000 24V	Rounds 7-22
5	(Germany) Markus Oestreich	Irmscher	Opel Omega 3000 24V	Rounds 7-10, 17-22
6	(Denmark) Kurt Thiim	AMG-Mercedes	Mercedes 190E 2.5-16 Evo; Mercedes 190E 2.5-16 Evo2	
7	(Germany) Klaus Ludwig	AMG-Mercedes	Mercedes 190E 2.5-16 Evo; Mercedes 190E 2.5-16 Evo2	
8	(United Kingdom) Steve Soper	Bigazzi	BMW M3 Sport Evolution	
9	(Germany) Joachim Winkelhock	Bigazzi	BMW M3 Sport Evolution	
10	(France) Jacques Laffite	Bigazzi	BMW M3 Sport Evolution	
11	(Germany) Altfrid Heger	Linder	BMW M3 Sport Evolution	
12	(Denmark) Kris Nissen	Linder	BMW M3 Sport Evolution	
13	(Germany) Franz Engstler	Bigazzi	BMW M3 Sport Evolution	Rounds 19-20
14	(Germany) Roland Asch	Snobeck	Mercedes 190E 2.5-16 Evo; Mercedes 190E 2.5-16 Evo2	
15	(France) Alain Cudini	Snobeck	Mercedes 190E 2.5-16 Evo; Mercedes 190E 2.5-16 Evo2	
16	(Germany) Frank Biela	MS-Jet-Racing	Mercedes 190E 2.5-16 Evo; Mercedes 190E 2.5-16 Evo2	
17	(Germany) Jörg van Ommen	MS-Jet-Racing	Mercedes 190E 2.5-16 Evo; Mercedes 190E 2.5-16 Evo2	
18	(Austria) Dieter Quester	Zakspeed	BMW M3 Sport Evolution	
19	(Germany) Armin Hahne	Zakspeed	BMW M3 Sport Evolution	
20	(Germany) Annette Meeuvissen	Zakspeed	BMW M3 Sport Evolution	
22	(Germany) Harald Grohs	Valier Motorsport	BMW M3 Sport Evolution	Rounds 1-2, 5-6, 15-18, 21-22
23	(Germany) Olaf Manthey	Team Isert	BMW M3 Sport Evolution	Rounds 7-18, 21-22
24	(Germany) Leopold von Bayern	Isert Motorsport	BMW M3 Sport Evolution	Rounds 1-2, 5-22
25	(Switzerland) Phillip Müller	Bemani Motorenbau	Toyota Supra	Rounds 9-10, 13-14
26	(Switzerland) Toni Seiler	Bemani Motorenbau	Toyota Supra	Rounds 9-10
27	(Germany) Peter Oberndorfer	Opel Team Schübel	Opel Kadett GSi 16V	Rounds 1-12
28	(Germany) Kurt König	Auto, Test & Tuning	BMW M3 Sport Evolution	Rounds 1-6, 9-16, 19-22
29	(Italy) Emanuele Pirro	Schnitzer Motorsport	BMW M3 Sport Evolution	Rounds 19-22
30	(Germany) Günter Murmann	MM-Motorsport GmbH	BMW M3 Sport Evolution	
31	(Germany) Frank Schmickler	MM Diebels	BMW M3 Sport Evolution	Rounds 5-22
32	(Germany) Christian Danner	Schnitzer Motorsport	BMW M3 Sport Evolution	Rounds 15-16, 21-22
33	(Germany) Gerd Ruch	Ruch Motorsport	Ford Mustang GT	Round 3-12, 19-22
34	(Belgium) Eric van de Poele	Schnitzer Motorsport	BMW M3 Sport Evolution	Rounds 21-22
35	(Germany) Franz Dufter	Tauber Motorsport	BMW M3 Sport Evolution	Rounds 15-16
36	(Germany) Carsten Struwe	Tauber Motorsport	BMW M3 Sport Evolution	Rounds 3-12, 17-18, 21-22
37	(Germany) Georg Severich	Tauber Motorsport	BMW M3 Sport Evolution	Rounds 19-20
40	(Germany) Armin Bernhard	BAS Motorsport	Mercedes 190E 2.3-16; Mercedes 190E 2.5-16 Evo	Round 1-4, 7-22
44	(Germany) Hans-Joachim Stuck	Schmidt Motorsport Technik	Audi V8 quattro	
45	(Germany) Walter Röhrl	Schmidt Motorsport Technik	Audi V8 quattro	
46	(Germany) Frank Jelinski	Audi Zentrum Reutlingen	Audi V8 quattro	Rounds 19-20
54	(Germany) Volker Strycek	Irmscher	Opel Omega 3000 Evo 500	
55	(Germany) Harald Becker	Team Vanicek	BMW M3 Sport Evolution	Rounds 1-12, 15-20
65	(Switzerland) Alain Menu	Linder	BMW M3 Sport Evolution	Rounds 17-20
66	(Germany) Peter Oberndorfer	Team Schübel	Opel Omega 3000 Evo 500	Rounds 1-14, 17-24
74	(Germany) Sepp Haider	Irmscher	Opel Omega 3000 Evo 500	Rounds 13-14
78	(Germany) Ellen Lohr	AMG-Mercedes	Mercedes 190E 2.5-16 Evo2	Rounds 1-10, 13-24
87	(Germany) Fritz Kreutzpointner	AMG-Mercedes	Mercedes 190E 2.5-16 Evo2	
88	(Germany) Bernd Schneider	AMG-Mercedes	Mercedes 190E 2.5-16 Evo2	Rounds 16-20, 23-24
99	(Germany) Manuel Reuter	Team Schübel	Opel Omega 3000 Evo 500	Rounds 15-16
?	(Czechoslovakia) Josef Venc	Team Vanicek	BMW M3 Sport Evolution	Rounds 21-22
?	(Germany) Jürgen Ruch	Ruch Motorsport	Ford Mustang GT	Round 3

== Results and standings ==
=== Point System ===
In 1990, points were awarded to the top 10 finishers in both races.

Position	1st	2nd	3rd	4th	5th	6th	7th	8th	9th	10th
Points	20	15	12	10	8	6	4	3	2	1

=== Calendar ===
Race		Date	Pole position	Fastest lap	Winning driver	Chassis	Entrant
ZOL (Belgium)	1	March 31, 1990	(Denmark) Kurt Thiim	(Germany) Hans-Joachim Stuck	(Denmark) Kurt Thiim	Mercedes 190E 2.5-16 Evo	AMG-Mercedes
ZOL (Belgium)	2	April 1, 1990	//////////////////////	(Denmark) Kurt Thiim	(Denmark) Kurt Thiim	Mercedes 190E 2.5-16 Evo	AMG-Mercedes
HOC1 (Germany)	1	April 8, 1990	(Germany) Klaus Ludwig	(Venezuela) Johnny Cecotto	(Germany) Klaus Ludwig	Mercedes 190E 2.5-16 Evo	AMG-Mercedes
HOC1 (Germany)	2	April 9, 1990	//////////////////////	(Germany) Joachim Winkelhock	(Venezuela) Johnny Cecotto	BMW M3 Sport Evolution	Schnitzer Motorsport
NÜR1 (Germany)	1	April 22, 1990	(Germany) Altfrid Heger	(United Kingdom) Steve Soper	(United Kingdom) Steve Soper	BMW M3 Sport Evolution	Bigazzi
NÜR1 (Germany)	2	April 23, 1990	//////////////////////	(France) Jacques Laffite	(United Kingdom) Steve Soper	BMW M3 Sport Evolution	Bigazzi
AVU (Germany)	1	May 6, 1990	(Germany) Hans-Joachim Stuck	(Germany) Hans-Joachim Stuck	(Germany) Hans-Joachim Stuck	Audi V8 quattro	Schmidt Motorsport Technik
AVU (Germany)	2	May 7, 1990		(Germany) Hans-Joachim Stuck	(Germany) Hans-Joachim Stuck	Audi V8 quattro	Schmidt Motorsport Technik
MAI (Germany)	1	May 20, 1990	(Germany) Roland Asch	(Germany) Klaus Ludwig	(Venezuela) Johnny Cecotto	BMW M3 Sport Evolution	Schnitzer Motorsport
MAI (Germany)	2	May 21, 1990		(Venezuela) Johnny Cecotto	(Venezuela) Johnny Cecotto	BMW M3 Sport Evolution	Schnitzer Motorsport
WUN (Germany)	1	June 3, 1990	(Germany) Hans-Joachim Stuck	(Germany) Hans-Joachim Stuck	(Germany) Hans-Joachim Stuck	Audi V8 quattro	Schmidt Motorsport Technik
WUN (Germany)	2	June 4, 1990		(Germany) Jörg van Ommen	(Germany) Hans-Joachim Stuck	Audi V8 quattro	Schmidt Motorsport Technik
NÜR2 (Germany)	1	June 16, 1990	(Germany) Klaus Ludwig	(France) Jacques Laffite	(France) Jacques Laffite	BMW M3 Sport Evolution	Bigazzi
NÜR2 (Germany)	2	June 17, 1990		(France) Jacques Laffite	(Germany) Frank Biela	Mercedes 190E 2.5-16 Evo	MS-Jet-Racing
NOR (Germany)	1	July 1, 1990	(Italy) Roberto Ravaglia	(Germany) Walter Röhrl	(Germany) Hans-Joachim Stuck	Audi V8 quattro	Schmidt Motorsport Technik
NOR (Germany)	2	July 2, 1990		(Germany) Altfrid Heger	(Italy) Roberto Ravaglia	BMW M3 Sport Evolution	Schnitzer Motorsport
DIE (Germany)	1	August 5, 1990	(Germany) Armin Hahne	(Germany) Joachim Winkelhock	(Denmark) Kurt Thiim	Mercedes 190E 2.5-16 Evo	AMG-Mercedes
DIE (Germany)	2	August 6, 1990		(Germany) Joachim Winkelhock	(Germany) Joachim Winkelhock	BMW M3 Sport Evolution	Bigazzi
NÜR3 (Germany)	1	September 2, 1990	(Germany) Armin Hahne	(Italy) Emanuele Pirro	(Italy) Emanuele Pirro	BMW M3 Sport Evolution	Schnitzer Motorsport
NÜR3 (Germany)	2	September 3, 1990		(Germany) Joachim Winkelhock	(Germany) Walter Röhrl	Audi V8 quattro	Schmidt Motorsport Technik
HOC2 (Germany)	1	October 14, 1990	(Germany) Frank Jelinski	(Italy) Emanuele Pirro	(Germany) Hans-Joachim Stuck	Audi V8 quattro	Schmidt Motorsport Technik
HOC2 (Germany)	2	October 15, 1990		(Germany) Klaus Ludwig	(Germany) Hans-Joachim Stuck	Audi V8 quattro	Schmidt Motorsport Technik
Source:.

== Bibliography ==
- Osterroth, Jochen von (1990). Deutsche Tourenwagen-Meisterschaft 1990: Das offizielle Jahrbuch (in German). Essen: Klartext Verlag. ISBN 978-3-88474-453-6.
- Voigt, Thomas (1990). Tourenwagen Story '90 (in German). Hamburg: tsv top special Verlag.
