= Roland Asch =

German racing driver (born 1950)

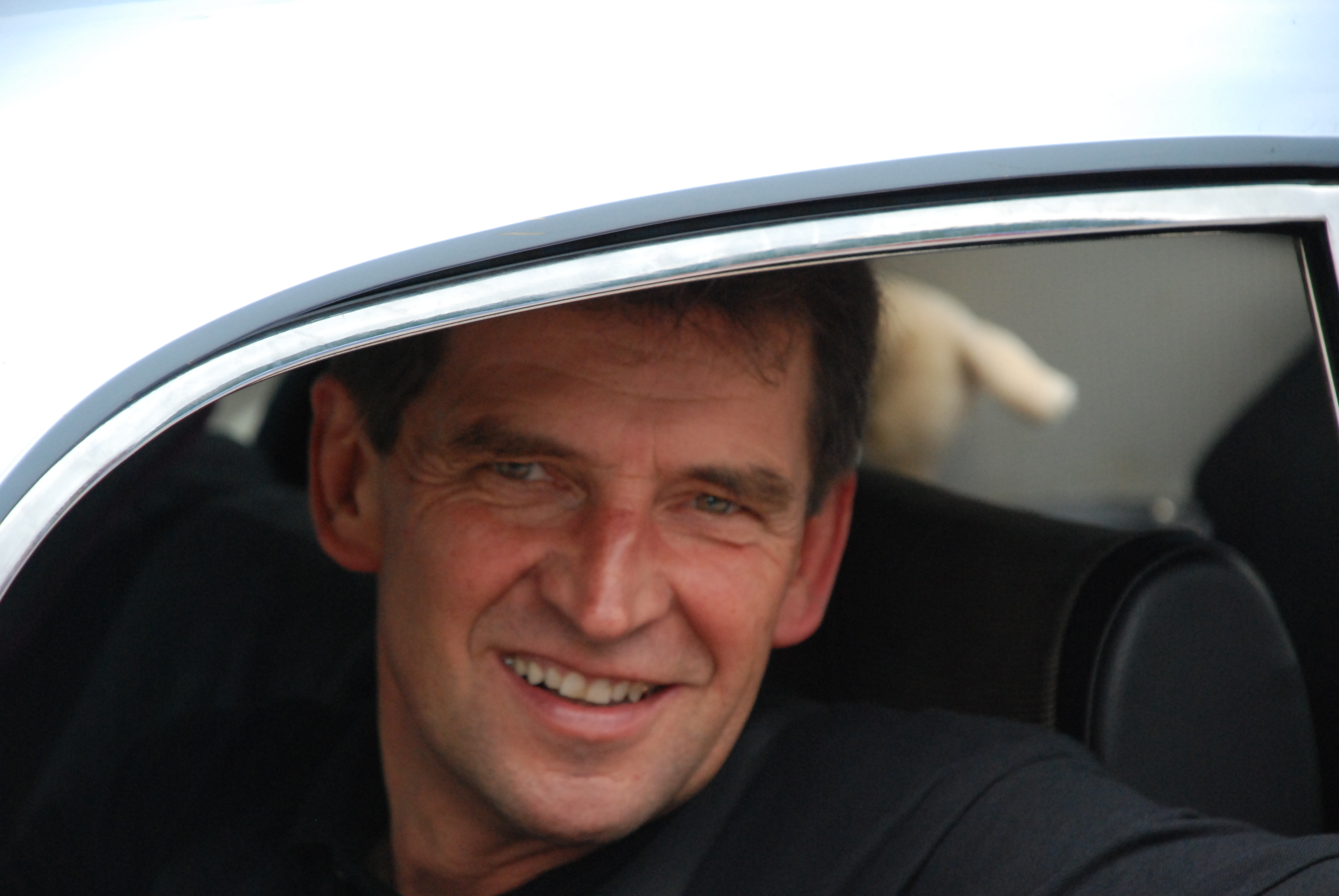
- Asch in 2008
- Born: 12 October 1950 (age 75); Altingen, Ammerbuch, West Germany
- Relatives: Sebastian Asch (son)

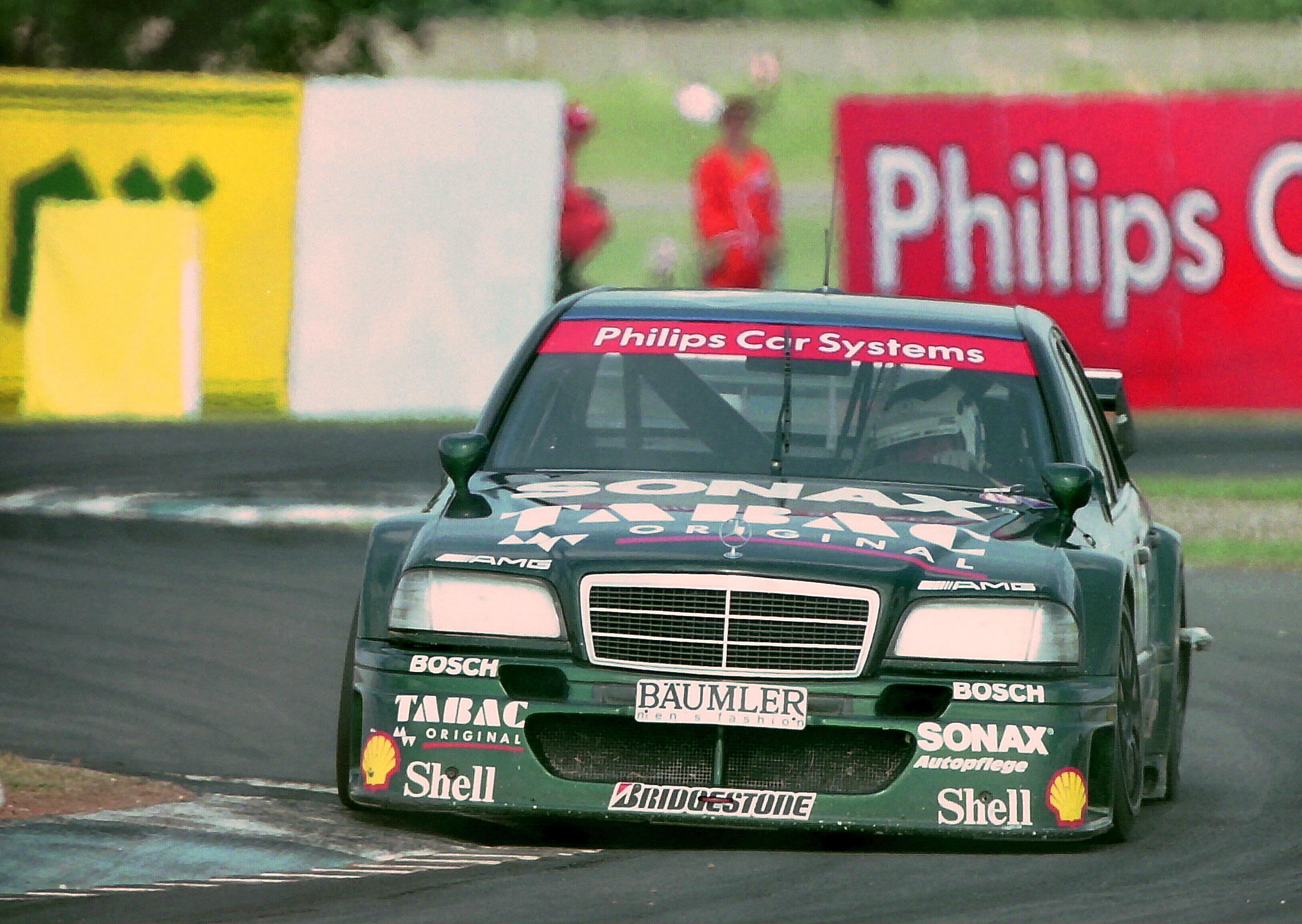
Roland Asch – AMG-Mercedes Tabac Original Sonax Team – AMG-Mercedes C-Klasse, 1994 DTM Donington Park.

Roland Asch (born 12 October 1950) is a German race car driver from Ammerbuch, near Stuttgart. He was a distinctive figure on the German motor racing scene in the 1990s.

== Racing career ==
Asch's career started in 1973 with slalom before moving to hillclimbing to become German Champion in 1981. After racing on circuits in the lower Trophy division of the Deutsche Rennsport Meisterschaft, he made his Deutsche Tourenwagen Meisterschaft (DTM) début at age 34 in 1985. From 1985 to 1994, Asch drove for Mercedes in DTM, moving to the German Supertouring Championship (STW) in 1995 for four years when the DTM faltered.

Apart from touring car racing, Asch was also busy in Porsche series. He won the German Porsche 944 Turbo Cup twice, in 1988 and 1989, before winning the German Porsche Carrera Cup in 1991.

In his 50s, Asch returned to the German Porsche Carrera Cup, where he raced until 2003, bar a one-off race during the 2004 season. In 2004, he also drove races in the European Touring Car Championship for RS-Line Ford, the brand he runs a dealership for at Ammerbuch.

From 1999 until 2005, Asch raced the 24 Hours Nürburgring, aboard the Nissan Skyline GT-R entry of Japanese team Falken every year as their lead driver. He last appeared on the race in 2010, in a project made by German magazine Sport auto (Germany) and Porsche test driver Walter Röhrl, who did not take part for health reasons.

Currently, Asch is supporting his son Sebastian Asch, who is racing in the SEAT León Cup.

=== Incidents ===
In 1994, Asch was involved in a controversial incident in DTM at the Alemannenring. Alessandro Nannini, racing for rivals Alfa Romeo, was running directly ahead of an already lapped Asch. While closing on a car in front, Nannini momentarily locked his rear wheels on the entry to the hairpin. He then regained control and took the racing line into the corner. Asch intentionally plowed into the side of Nannini, spinning him and damaging his car. As a result of this, Asch's Mercedes teammate Klaus Ludwig won the championship. After entering the pits, Nannini rejoined behind Asch and intentionally rammed him off the track in revenge at the same hairpin.

At the end of the 1999 and final STW season at the Nürburgring, Asch was again accused by some of hitting an opponent intentionally to support his Opel teammate Uwe Alzen. Asch was called into the pits for a jump start penalty, but later stated that his radio had failed. On the last lap, he was driving behind championship contenders and race leaders Alzen and Christian Abt, who were about to lap Abt's teammate Kris Nissen. With the championship already going Abt's way as per the running order, Nissen tangled with Alzen on the second-to-last corner, causing heavy damage to Alzen's car. Asch then hit the Audi of Abt in the last corner, handing the cup to Alzen, who came home second with his damaged car. While this incident was initially considered a race accident, Asch was punished for ignoring the penalty. Alzen celebrated immediately after the race, but the championship was given to Abt in November after Asch's move on him in the last corner was considered deliberate action by a DMSB court of appeal, based on video evidence.

== Racing record ==
=== Complete Deutsche Tourenwagen Meisterschaft results ===
(key) (Races in bold indicate pole position) (Races in italics indicate fastest lap)

Year	Team	Car	1	2	3	4	5	6	7	8	9	10	11	12	13	14	15	16	17	18	19	20	21	22	23	24	Pos.	Pts
1984		BMW 323i	ZOL	HOC; 11	AVU	AVU	MFA	WUN	NÜR	NÜR	NOR	NÜR	DIE	HOC	HOC	ZOL	NÜR										44th	8
1985	ABR Ringhausen Rennsport	Ford Mustang 5.0 GT	ZOL; Ret	WUN; 4	AVU; 3	MFA; 14	ERD; 5	ERD	DIE; 5	DIE; 7	ZOL; 8	SIE; 2	NÜR; 10														4th	94
1986	Ford Ringshausen	Ford Mustang 5.0 GT	ZOL; 5	HOC; 19	NÜR	AVU; Ret	MFA	WUN																			19th	29
1986	Ford Ringshausen	Ford Sierra XR4 TI							NÜR; 4	ZOL	NÜR																19th	29
1988	BMK-Motorsport	Mercedes 190E 2.3-16	ZOL; 1; 14	ZOL; 2; 11	HOC; 1; 8	HOC; 2; 9	NÜR; 1; 3	NÜR; 2; 4	BRN; 1; 4	BRN; 2; 11	AVU; 1; 14	AVU; 2 Ret	MFA; 1; 2	MFA; 2; 2	NÜR; 1; 2	NÜR; 2 Ret	NOR; 1; 2	NOR; 2; 3	WUN; 1; 9	WUN; 2 Ret	SAL; 1	SAL; 2	HUN; 1; 7	HUN; 2; 11	HOC; 1; 2	HOC; 2; 2	2nd	242
1989	MS-Jet Racing	Mercedes 190E 2.3-16	ZOL; 1; 12	ZOL; 2; 10	HOC; 1; 8	HOC; 2; 7	NÜR; 1; 5	NÜR; 2 Ret	MFA; 1; 1	**MFA**; **2**; 9																	10th	161
1989	MS-Jet Racing	Mercedes 190E 2.5-16 Evo									AVU; 1 Ret	AVU; 2 DNS	NÜR; 1; 6	NÜR; 2 Ret	NOR; 1; 13	NOR; 2; 12	HOC; 1 Ret	HOC; 2 Ret	DIE; 1; 6	DIE; 2 Ret	NÜR; 1; 8	NÜR; 2; 5	HOC; 1; 12	HOC; 2; 12			10th	161
1990	Snobeck Racing Service	Mercedes 190E 2.5-16 Evo	ZOL; 1; 8	ZOL; 2; 13	HOC; 1 Ret	HOC; 2 DNS	NÜR; 1; 20	NÜR; 2; 9	AVU; 1; 15	AVU; 2; 7	**MFA**; **1** Ret	**MFA**; **2** Ret	WUN; 1; 13	WUN; 2; 10	NÜR; 1 Ret	NÜR; 2; 14	NOR; 1; 10	NOR; 2; 11	DIE; 1 Ret	DIE; 2; 12							21st	13
1990	Snobeck Racing Service	Mercedes 190E 2.5-16 Evo2																			NÜR; 1; 13	NÜR; 2; 9	HOC; 1 Ret	HOC; 2 Ret			21st	13
1991	Zakspeed Racing	Mercedes 190E 2.5-16 Evo2	ZOL; 1; 10	ZOL; 2; 7	HOC; 1; 8	HOC; 2 Ret	NÜR; 1; 4	NÜR; 2 Ret	AVU; 1; 10	AVU; 2; 7	WUN; 1; 7	WUN; 2; 7	**NOR**; **1**; 3	**NOR**; **2**; 3	DIE; 1; 7	DIE; 2; 7	**NÜR**; **1**; 4	**NÜR**; **2**; 5	ALE; 1 Ret	ALE; 2 Ret	HOC; 1; 7	HOC; 2; 6	**BRN**; **1**; 3	**BRN**; **2**; 2	DON; 1; 21	DON; 2 Ret	9th	91
1992	Diebels Zakspeed Team	Mercedes 190E 2.5-16 Evo2	ZOL; 1; 7	ZOL; 2; 2	NÜR; 1; 5	NÜR; 2; 1	WUN; 1; 6	WUN; 2 Ret	AVU; 1 Ret	AVU; 2; 11	HOC; 1; 5	HOC; 2; 1	NÜR; 1; 7	NÜR; 2; 6	**NOR**; **1**; 2	**NOR**; **2**; 5	BRN; 1; 5	BRN; 2; 5	DIE; 1; 12	DIE; 2; 10	ALE; 1 Ret	ALE; 2; 11	NÜR; 1; 9	NÜR; 2; 7	HOC; 1; 6	HOC; 2 Ret	6th	143
1993	AMG-Mercedes Sonax	Mercedes 190E 2.5-16 Evo2	ZOL; 1; 3	ZOL; 2; 4	HOC; 1; 2	HOC; 2; 4	NÜR; 1; 4	NÜR; 2; 3	WUN; 1; 6	WUN; 2; 4																	2nd	204
1993	AMG-Mercedes Sonax	Mercedes 190E 2.5-16 93									NÜR; 1; 7	NÜR; 2; 17	NOR; 1; 5	NOR; 2; 2	DON; 1; 5	DON; 2; 5	DIE; 1; 1	**DIE**; **2**; 5	ALE; 1 Ret	ALE; 2; 6	AVU; 1; 1	**AVU**; **2**; 1	HOC; 1; 6	HOC; 2; 3			2nd	204
1994	AMG Mercedes Tabac-Original Sonax	Mercedes C-Class V6	ZOL; 1; 2	ZOL; 2; 2	HOC; 1 Ret	HOC; 2; 11	NÜR; 1; 12	NÜR; 2; 6	MUG; 1; 7	MUG; 2; 4	NÜR; 1; 6	NÜR; 2; 4	NOR; 1 Ret	NOR; 2 DNS	DON; 1; 4	DON; 2; 8	DIE; 1; 2	DIE; 2; 11	NÜR; 1; 4	NÜR; 2; 3	AVU; 1; 5	AVU; 2; 2	ALE; 1; 8	ALE; 2; 7	HOC; 1; 8	HOC; 2; 9	6th	124
2000	Abt Sportsline 1	Abt-Audi TT-R 2000	HOC; 1	HOC; 2	OSC; 1; 15	OSC; 2 Ret	NOR; 1	NOR; 2	SAC; 1	SAC; 2	NÜR; 1	NÜR; 2	LAU; 1	LAU; 2	OSC; 1	OSC; 2	NÜR; 1	NÜR; 2	HOC; 1	HOC; 2							21st	0

=== Complete Super Tourenwagen Cup results ===
(key) (Races in bold indicate pole position) (Races in italics indicate fastest lap)

Year	Team	Car	1	2	3	4	5	6	7	8	9	10	11	12	13	14	15	16	17	18	19	20	DC	Points
1995	Ford Team Eggenberger	Ford Mondeo	ZOL; 1 Ret	ZOL; 2 Ret	SPA; 1; 9	SPA; 2; 12	ÖST; 1; 9	ÖST; 2; 8	HOC; 1 Ret	HOC; 2; 11	NÜR; 1; 1	NÜR; 2; 2	SAL; 1; 6	SAL; 2; 8	AVU; 1; 5	AVU; 2; 6	NÜR; 1; 7	NÜR; 2; 9					8th	268
1996	Ford Mondeo Team Schübel	Ford Mondeo	ZOL; 1; 12	ZOL; 2 Ret	ASS; 1; 12	ASS; 2; 10	HOC; 1; 14	HOC; 2; 10	SAC; 1; 12	SAC; 2; 14	WUN; 1; 13	WUN; 2; 13	ZWE; 1 Ret	ZWE; 2 Ret	SAL; 1 Ret	SAL; 2; 9	AVU; 1; 9	AVU; 2; 9	NÜR; 1; 19	NÜR; 2; 16			14th	188
1997	Nissan Primera Racing	Nissan Primera	HOC; 1; 13	HOC; 2; 10	ZOL; 1; 21	ZOL; 2; 18	NÜR; 1; 9	NÜR; 2; 9	SAC; 1; 10	SAC; 2; 9	NOR; 1; 12	NOR; 2; 6	WUN; 1; 11	WUN; 2; 12	ZWE; 1; 13	ZWE; 2; 11	SAL; 1; 14	SAL; 2; 11	REG; 1 Ret	REG; 2; 12	NÜR; 1; 11	NÜR; 2; 9	8th	285
1998	Nissan Primera Racing	Nissan Primera	HOC; 1; 15	HOC; 1; 10	**NÜR**; **1**; 1	**NÜR**; **2**; 4	SAC; 1 Ret	SAC; 2; 3	NOR; 1; 3	NOR; 2; 6	REG; 1; 6	REG; 2; 7	WUN; 1 Ret	WUN; 2 DNS	ZWE; 1; 6	ZWE; 2; 3	SAL; 1; 22	SAL; 2; 11	OSC; 1; 10	OSC; 2; 13	NÜR; 1 Ret	NÜR; 2; 21	8th	327
1999	Irmscher Sport	Opel Vectra	SAC; 1; 9	SAC; 2; 8	ZWE; 1; 10	ZWE; 2; 9	OSC; 1; 11	OSC; 2; 10	NOR; 1; 8	NOR; 2; 9	MIS; 1; 9	MIS; 2; 9	NÜR; 1 Ret	NÜR; 2 Ret	SAL; 1; 5	SAL; 2; 8	OSC; 1; 6	OSC; 2; 6	HOC; 1; 5	HOC; 2; 16	NÜR; 1; 5	NÜR; 2 DSQ	10th	307

Sporting positions
Preceded by Joachim Winkelhock	Porsche Carrera Cup Germany champion 1987–1989	Succeeded by Olaf Manthey
Preceded by Olaf Manthey	Porsche Carrera Cup Germany champion 1991	Succeeded by Uwe Alzen
