= Audi V8 =

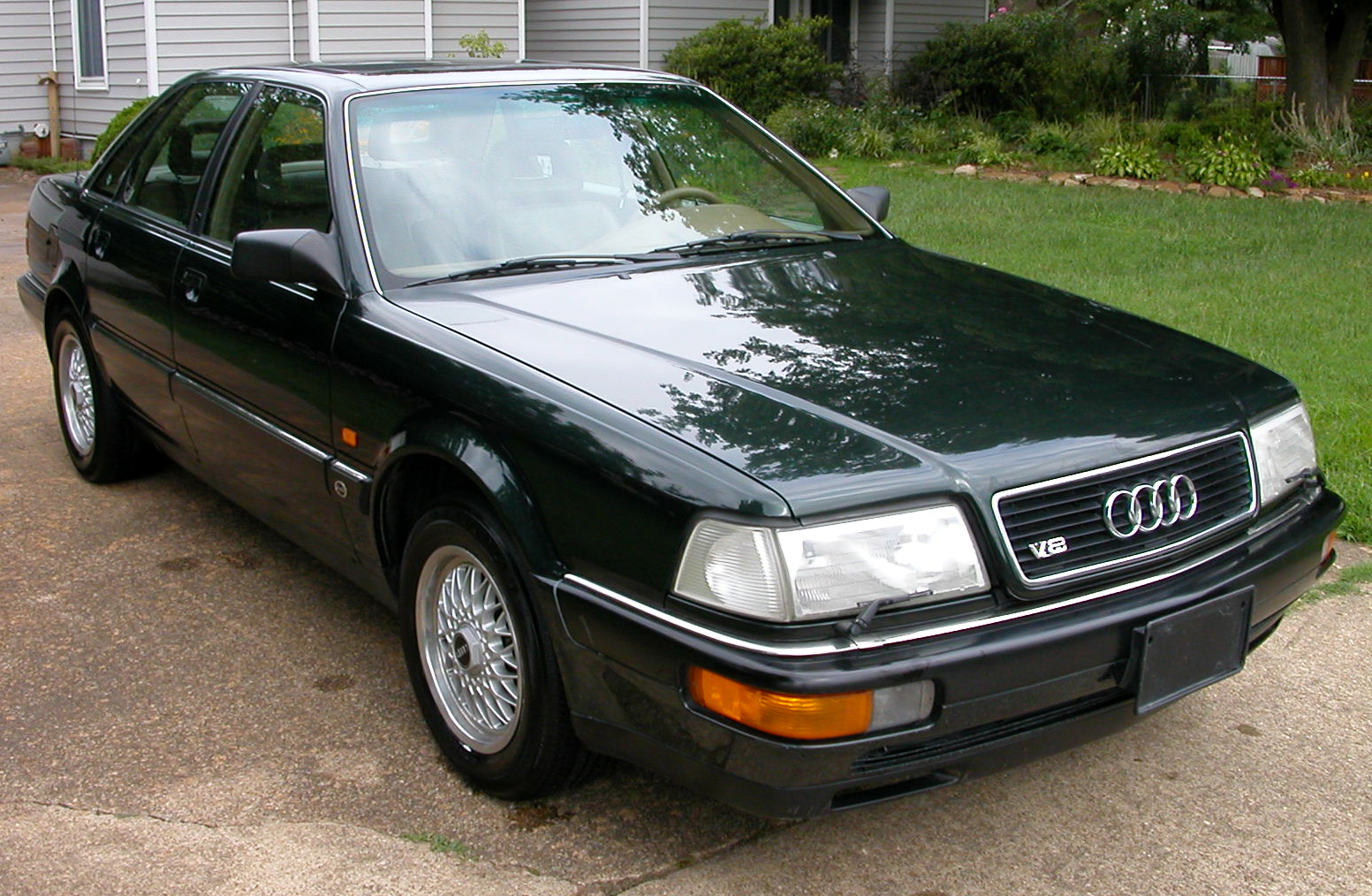
- Audi V8

Overview
- Manufacturer: Audi AG
- Model code: 4C
- Production: October 1988 – November 1993
- Assembly: Germany: Neckarsulm
- Designer: Erwin Leo Himmel (1984)

Body and chassis
- Class: Full-size luxury car
- Body style: 4-door saloon
- Layout: Longitudinal front engine Quattro permanent four-wheel drive
- Platform: Volkswagen Group D1 (aka D11)
- Related: Audi 100/200

Powertrain
- Engine: 3.6 L PT V8; 4.2 L ABH V8
- Transmission: 4-speed ZF 4HP24A automatic 5-speed manual (3.6 V8); 6-speed manual (4.2 V8)

Dimensions
- Wheelbase: SWB: 2,702 mm (106.4 in); LWB: 3,020 mm (118.9 in)
- Length: SWB: 4,861 mm (191.4 in); LWB: 5,190 mm (204.3 in)
- Width: 1,814 mm (71.4 in)
- Height: 1,420 mm (55.9 in)
- Curb weight: 3.6: 1,710 kg (3,770 lb); 4.2: 1,810 kg (3,990 lb) (Quattro); LWB: 1,770 kg (3,900 lb)

Chronology
- Successor: Audi A8

The Audi V8 (Typ 4C) is a four-door, full-size luxury saloon, designed, manufactured and marketed by Audi in Germany from 1988 to 1993, as the company's flagship. As the first car from Audi to use a V8 engine, it also was the first Audi to combine a quattro system with an automatic transmission. Early cars used 3.6-litre V8s, while later cars featured a 4.2-litre version of the engine. The Audi V8 was replaced by the Audi A8 in 1994, although the A8 was not marketed in North America until 1996.

The competition model of the Audi V8 won back-to-back Deutsche Tourenwagen Meisterschaft driver's titles in 1990 and 1991, with the championship winners being Hans-Joachim Stuck and Frank Biela respectively. Audi was the first company to win back-to-back DTM titles.

== Overview ==
Standard features for the Audi V8 included a 32-valve, double overhead camshaft (DOHC) V8 engine and a four-speed electronically controlled ZF 4HP24A automatic transmission providing Audi's quattro permanent four-wheel drive system. A five-speed (later in production six-speed) manual transmission was also available.

The Audi V8 had a galvanized steel body, with a 10-year anti-perforation warranty (against corrosion). The Audi V8 was specifically designed to be a top of the range 'flagship' car and included a number of luxury features as standard equipment, including leather seating and Audi's quattro all wheel drive system (see standard features list). The Audi V8 created a new elevated image for the company, providing a viable alternative to established competitors such as Mercedes-Benz and BMW. In this regard, the car was a cornerstone in developing the history of the Audi marque as it is today.

Factory production commenced in October 1988, and ceased in November 1993, although sales of completed vehicles continued in 1994. It was replaced by the Audi A8 in 1994.

== Body style ==
The Audi V8 used an enlarged version of the bodyshell from the Typ 44 Audi 100 and 200 models, and was based on a stretched version of their Volkswagen Group C3 automobile platform, known either as the D1 or D11 platform. The Audi V8 differed from the Audi 100/200 with a unique grille attached to the hood, new bumpers and headlights, all-red tail lamps, 12 mm extended wheelbase, wider track, pronounced fenders, and more wood trim in the interior. Furthermore, only alloy wheels were offered, ranging from 15 to 17 inches.

In addition to the standard-length model, there was also a long wheelbase (LWB), ('Lang' in German) version of the V8 (refer to the infobox for differences in dimensions). It was assembled at Steyr-Daimler-Puch factory in Graz (see production figures). This tradition would continue with the A8, offered in "A8L" format (though only in year 2010 A8L reached the size of the V8L).

A once-off experimental Avant (estate) version was built for the wife of former Audi CEO Ferdinand Piech. This car is no longer on display at the Audi Forum Ingolstadt, but in storage in Neckarsulm.

== Powertrain ==
Powertrain detail of the Audi V8 featured one of two all-new, all-aluminium alloy engines – both petrol engines, and both in V8 configuration with 32 valves (four valves per cylinder) with dual valve springs, and four overhead camshafts (DOHC). The design set the pattern for future Audi-developed Volkswagen Group V8 engines. In addition to using an all-aluminum alloy cylinder block (when the established material was grey cast iron), the camshafts were driven using a hybrid method. A rubber/kevlar toothed timing belt, driven from the front of the crankshaft operated only the exhaust camshaft in each bank. The inlet camshafts were then operated via a simplex roller chain from the exhaust camshaft – the right bank, (cylinders 1–4) at the rear of the engine, and the left bank (cylinders 5–8) at the front of the engine, immediately behind the timing belt. This method reduced the complexity of the timing belt layout, and as a result, required fewer components, such as idler rollers and guides, and led to easier and less costly maintenance of the timing belt and associated components. The intervals for changing the timing belts varied; the 3.6 V8 (PT) required changing every 90,000 kilometres (60,000 mi), whereas the 4.2 V8 (ABH) had a longer interval at 120,000 kilometres (75,000 mi). A thermostatically controlled electric cooling fan also became standard, replacing the engine-driven viscous fans on earlier cars. This not only provided forced airflow for the engine coolant radiator, but also for the smaller engine oil cooler.

Audi's 'trademark' quattro permanent (or semi-permanent, dependent on gearbox type) four-wheel drive system was the only offering for the drivetrain. This normally distributes the engine torque as a 'default' 50:50 between front and rear axles, but can automatically dynamically apportion up to a bias of 20:80 to 80:20 front and rear. The automatic transmission utilizes a hydraulically controlled multi-plate clutch to apportion drive between front and rear axles, whereas the manual transmission variants utilize a Torsen type 1 Torque Sensing center differential. The rear axle final drive unit contains a Torsen type 1 Torque Sensing differential, instead of the more common hypoid open differential.

=== Engines ===
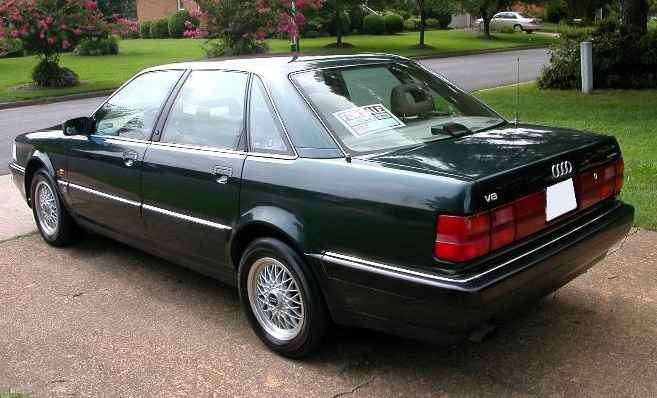
1993 Audi V8 4.2 (US) with chrome 'V8' badge

Both available engines used a Bosch Motronic fully electronic engine control unit (ECU), with cylinder bank selective knock control, dual-barrel throttle valve, lambda mixture control via intake air volume metering and exhaust gas temperature sensor, and required unleaded petrol. Fuel was delivered to the combustion chambers via eight intake manifold-sited electronic fuel injectors, fed from two common fuel rails (one per cylinder bank), and were sequentially 'fired' or activated in accordance with the engine's firing order. Whilst the 3.6 V8 was able to use 95 RON (91 AKI) fuel, for the 4.2 V8, the more expensive 98 RON (93 AKI) 'SuperPlus' unleaded was required in order to achieve the quoted power output. The usage of 95 RON in the 4.2 V8 resulted in a lower power output, as well as increased fuel consumption.

At the initial launch of the Audi V8, the only offering was the 3.6-litre powerplant, which displaced 3,562 cubic centimetres (217.4 cu in). This V8 engine was derived from the 1.8 16V engine from the Golf GTI. It was DIN-rated with a maximum motive power output of 184 kilowatts (250 PS; 247 bhp) at 5,800 revolutions per minute (rpm), and generated a torque turning force of 340 newton-metres (251 lbf⋅ft) at 4,000 rpm. In August 1991, Audi introduced a 4.2-litre engine, displacing 4,172 cubic centimetres (254.6 cu in), to complement the choice of the existing 3.6-litre V8. This shared many components from the 3.6 V8, and the 4.2 unit was identical to the optional V8 used in the Audi S4 (aka Ur-S4), sharing the same rated outputs and ABH identification code. Like the 3.6 V8 model, the existing four-speed automatic gearbox remained available. However, a new six-speed manual gearbox replaced the five-speed manual. This powerplant is identified by chrome 'V8' badges on the front grille and at trunk lid, where in some cars also '4.2 quattro' badge is present.

==== Details and performance ====
Engine (code)	Displacement, Type Valvetrain	Fuel grade	Max. Motive Power at rpm (DIN 80/1269/EWG)	Max. torque at rpm	Transmissions	0-100 km/h (62 mph)	Top speed	Dates
3.6 V8 (PT)	3,562 cc V8 engine 32 valve DOHC	95 RON (91 AKI) unleaded petrol	184 kW (250 PS; 247 bhp) @ 5,800	340 N⋅m (251 lbf⋅ft) @ 4,000	4-sp ZF 4HP24A auto 5-sp manual	9.9 secs‡ 7.6 secs*	232 km/h (144.2 mph)‡ 244 km/h (151.6 mph)*	10/88 ÷ 11/93
4.2 V8 (ABH)	4,172 cc V8 engine 32 valve DOHC	98 RON (93 AKI) unleaded petrol	206 kW (280 PS; 276 bhp) @ 5,800	400 N⋅m (295 lbf⋅ft) @ 4,000	4-sp ZF 4HP24A auto 6-sp manual	7.7 secs‡ 6.8 secs*	250 km/h (155.3 mph)	08/91 ÷ 07/92
‡ = with automatic transmission * = with manual transmission

=== Transmissions ===
A choice of transmissions were offered. A ZF Friedrichshafen-sourced four-speed 4HP24A automatic transmission with a torque converter was available throughout the V8 production run. Automatic transmission has three modes: "S" – Sport; "E" – Economic and "M" – Manual operation. St mode changes gears at higher rpms than E; M allows the driver to select gears using the lever. There were also two manual transmission offerings – for the 3.6: a five-speed manual gearbox, or later for the 4.2, a six-speed manual. Both manual transmission variants used a 240-millimetre (9.4 in) single-plate clutch.

==== Details ====
The details of Audi V8 transmission are shown in the table below:

Transmission type	Identification		Gear ratios							
Transmission type	Parts code	ID codes	1st	2nd	3rd	4th	5th	6th	Reverse	Final drive
4-speed automatic	018	AKD, AYU, AZG	2.480	1.480	1.000	0.728	—	—	2.086	4.111
5-speed manual	016	AWW	3.500	1.889	1.231	0.903	0.730	—	2.200	4.111
6-speed manual	01E	CBM, CBN	3.500	1.889	1.320	1.034	0.857 (CBM), 0.806 (CBN)	0.730 (CBM), 0.684 (CBN)	2.750	4.111

== Steering, brakes, wheels ==
The Audi V8 came equipped with rack and pinion power assisted steering (PAS) as standard. An electronically controlled variable assisted 'servotronic' version was also available. It was fitted with a high-performance brake system, which included radially ventilated disc brakes front and rear. The fronts were rather unusual – designed by Continental AG and sized at 310 millimetres (12.2 in) in diameter by 25 millimetres (0.98 in) thick, but the caliper was mounted inside the disc. The fronts also incorporated electronic brake pad wear sensors. The rears were 269 millimetres (10.6 in) by 20 millimetres (0.79 in), and incorporated a cable-operated parking brake. A Bosch anti-lock braking system (ABS) was also standard.

Standard wheels were 7.5J x 15 H2 ET35 'aero' style light alloy wheels fitted with 215/60 R15 steel-belted radial tyres. Optional multi-spoke BBS-sourced (with Audi centre-cap badge) alloy wheels were also available, in either 8.0J x 16, or 8.0J x 17 sizes.

== Features ==
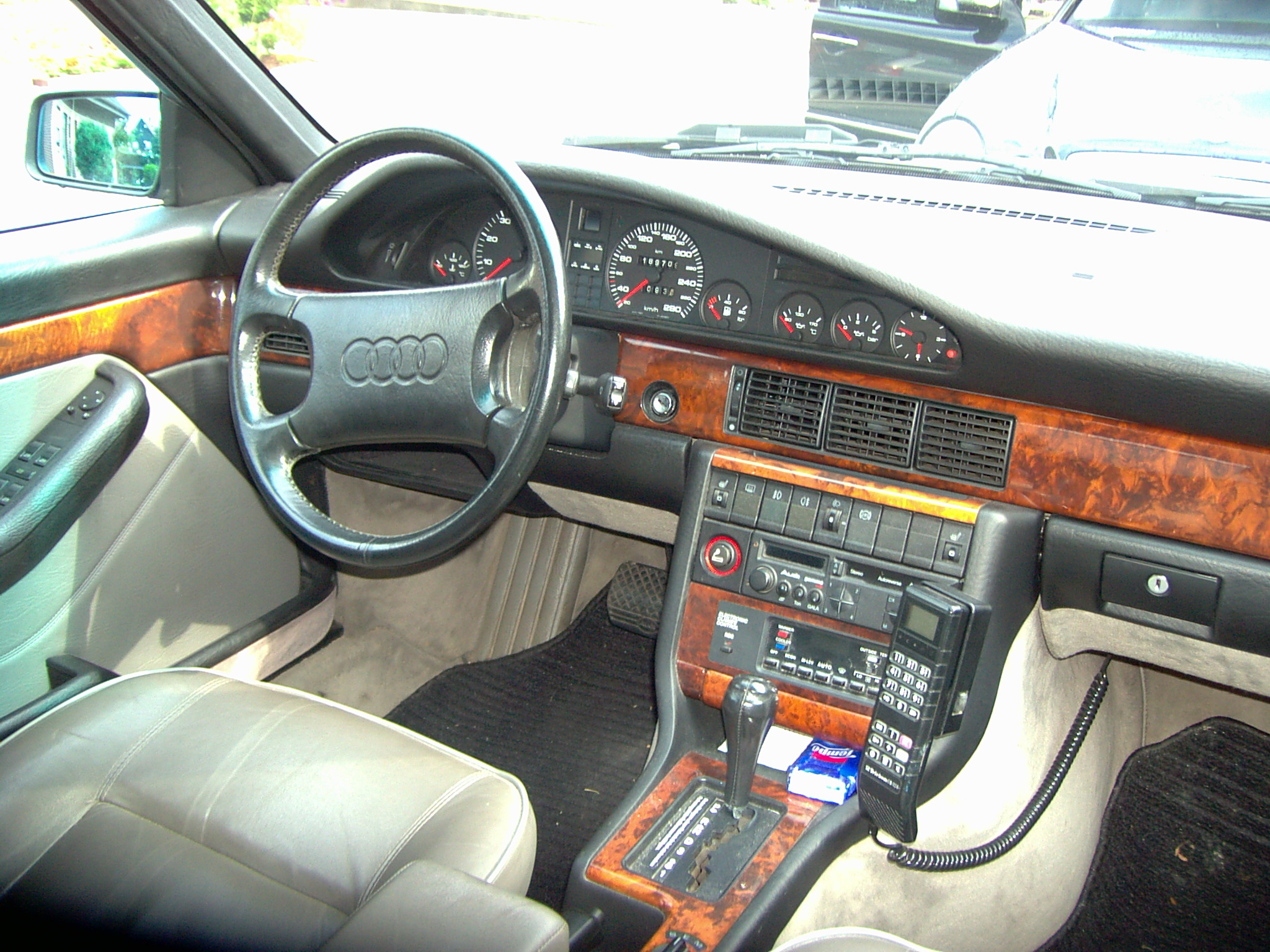
Audi V8 interior

The Audi V8 came standard with a range of features, including a BOSE audio system with eight speakers, walnut wood trim, leather interior, and heated seats. Some available colors included pearl white, lago blue (teal), blue mica, tornado red and black. All paint finishes were pearlescent or metallic. The lists below detail other standard and optional features.

=== Standard ===
Standard features that came with the Audi V8.

- Anti-theft vehicle alarm system
- Drivers frontal airbag (from 1991, front passenger airbag)
- Three-point seatbelts front & rear
- Procon-ten safety system
- Child safety door locks
- First aid kit (built in armrest in the rear seats)
- Two-side galvanized bodywork
- Automatic climate control system
- Electronic cruise control
- Dual power side mirrors with electrically heated defog
- Power windows with rear window disable
- Power central locking system
- Trip information computer (6 function)
- Auto check system with radio function display
- Expandable storage/ski sack
- Tinted glass
- Rear window defogger
- Interior lighting courtesy delay
- Illuminated vanity mirrors, trunk engine compartment, glovebox, lighters and ashtray
- Audi/Bose eight-speaker music system
- GSM cellular telephone with hands-free feature (built in armrest between front seats)
- Walnut wood trim, woven wool carpets
- Power front seats with 4-position driver memory
- Electrically heatable front & rear seats
- Aerodynamic halogen headlamps with wiper/washer system
- Front wipers with intermittent mode and heated windshield washer nozzles
- Front & rear fog lights

=== Optional ===
Optional features that were offered with the Audi V8.

- Electrically heated door lock cylinders
- Sports front seats with extendable thigh support
- Power operated rear window roller sunblind, with manual operated rear side window roller sunblinds
- Webasto fuel-burning cabin heater

== Motorsport ==
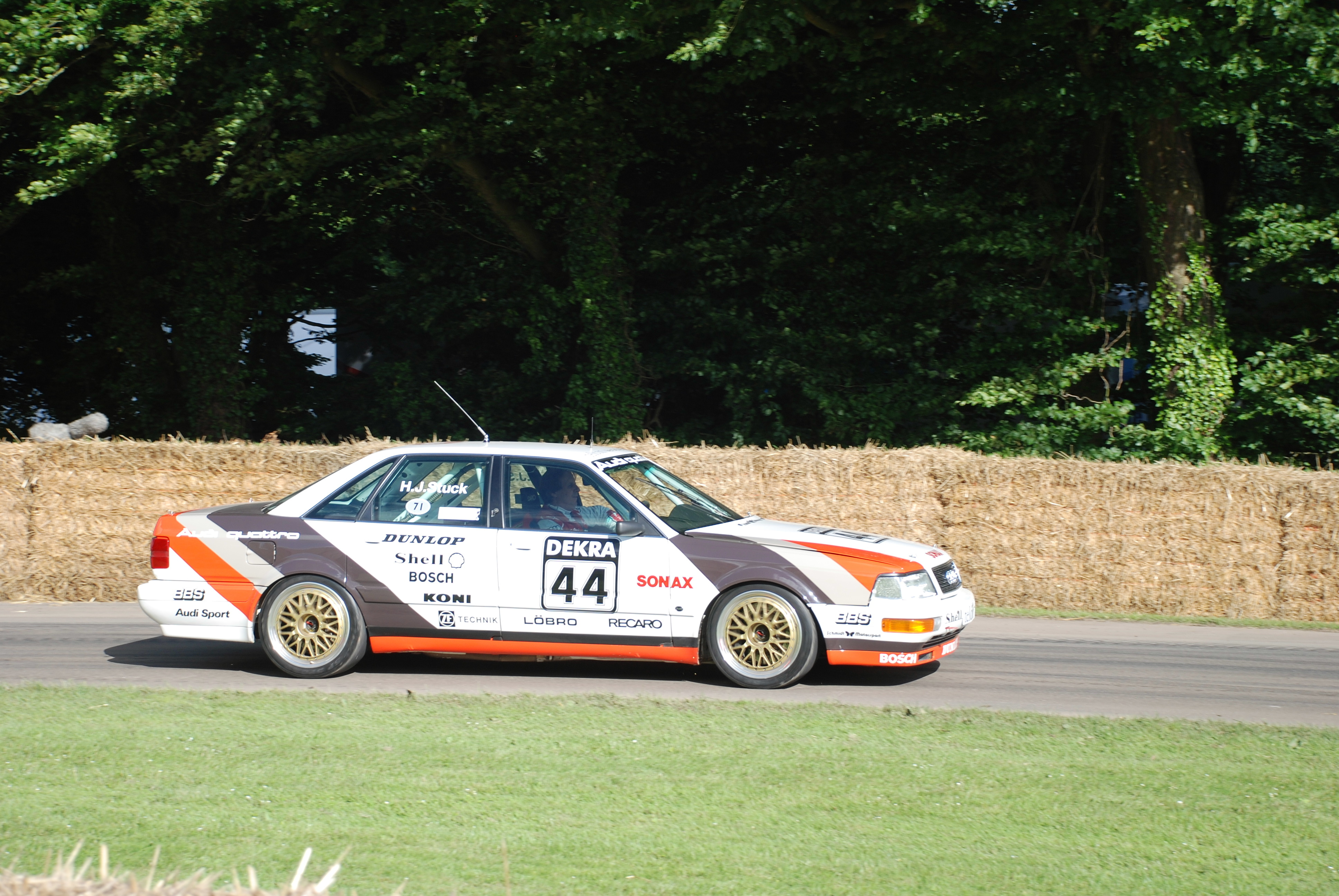
Audi V8 DTM

Audi developed a Group A competition version of the Audi V8 for entry into the Deutsche Tourenwagen Meisterschaft (DTM) (German Touring Car Championship) auto racing series equipped with a 309 kW (420 PS; 414 bhp), later 340 kW (462 PS; 456 bhp), 3.6 V8 engine and 6-speed manual transmission, and began racing with it in 1990 with Schmidt MotorSport (SMS) running the operation, and Hans-Joachim Stuck, Walter Röhrl and Frank Jelinski driving. In the 1990 DTM season all of the three teams claimed together the entire podium (1st, 2nd and 3rd places) at Hockenheimring race. Stuck won the title, and the following year, Audi added a second team to the mix, Audi Zentrum Reutlingen (AZR). SMS continued with Stuck and Jelinski, while AZR raced with Frank Biela and Hubert Haupt. Biela gave Audi another crown in 1991, but was unable to defend the title in 1992.

For the 1992 season, Audi had changed their engines to use a 180° flatplane crankshaft, which they said had been re-forged and bent from the original 90° crossplane part as used in production model. The DTM organisers found this highly modified crankshaft deviated from original homologated standard crankshaft, and therefore deemed it illegal. Audi subsequently withdrew from the championship.

During its presence at DTM the Audi V8 competed with much smaller and about 300 kg (661 lb) lighter Mercedes 190, BMW M3, and slightly smaller Opel Omega 3000. None of those cars were equipped with V8 engines or 4-wheel drive.

== Sales ==
Year	Production
1988	
1989	6,918
1990	4,816
1991	3,126
1992	3,031
1993	1,439
