= Procon-ten =

Safety restraint system used by Audi

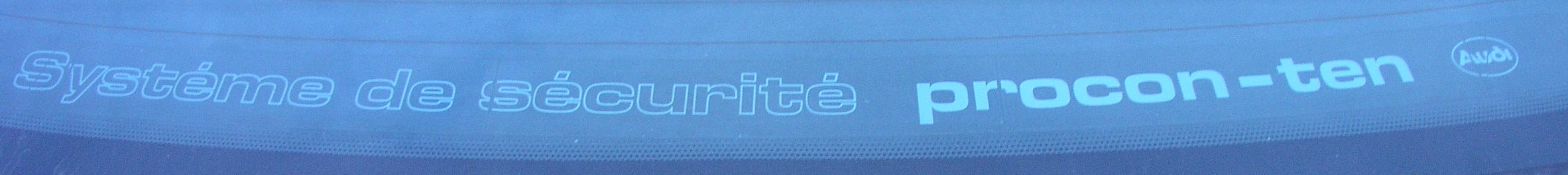
Sticker on the rear window of a procon-ten equipped Audi

procon-ten (lower case initial "p") (an acronym for Programmed Contraction-Tension) is a proprietary Safety Restraint System (SRS), used by German car manufacturer Audi from 1986 until the mid-1990s.

Audi was one of the last German manufacturers to employ airbags in their cars, mainly due to the high reliability and cost-effectiveness of the technology they trademarked as "procon-ten".

The procon-ten system used thick cables, similar to winch cables, running around the rear of the engine, and linked to it. In the event of a frontal impact, the force and momentum of the impact would shift the engine rearwards, tensioning and 'pulling' the cables, which were in turn connected to the steering column and seat belt mounts. When the cable was pulled tight by the engine, the cables would pull the steering wheel towards the front of the car, clear of the driver, and also remove any slack in the seat belts, holding the occupants more firmly in their seats until the accident had finished.

Audi engines were by tradition mounted longitudinally, in front of the front wheels, as opposed to transverse engine configuration. This meant the engine was very close to the front bumper, (especially on 5 cylinder variants) and that the radiator often had to be offset to halfway down one side of the engine bay. One advantage of this technique is that the engine is one of the first things to be struck in a frontal impact, taking much of the force, and allowing for high responsiveness of the procon-ten system. One key disadvantage however, is that the system is relatively ineffective in an offset impact (rather than directly head-on) since the engine can only absorb part of the collision energy. It is also unsuitable for cars with a transverse engine configuration.

The procon-ten system was available for cars such as the 100 / 200 and the V8, as well as the 80 / 90. It was discontinued in 1994, with the introduction of the new A4 and A8 series, and the 100-based Audi A6, all in 1994, for the 1995 model year.
