= Lola T110 =

- Category: Group 6 Group 7
- Constructor: Lola
- Designer: Eric Broadley

Technical specifications
- Chassis: Fiberglass body over tubular spaceframe
- Suspension (front): double wishbones, coil springs over shock absorbers, anti-roll bar
- Suspension (rear): reversed lower wishbones, top links, coil springs over shock absorbers
- Engine: BMW Apfelbeck 1,990 cc (2 L; 121 cu in) straight-four engine naturally-aspirated mid-engined
- Power: 260–280 hp (190–210 kW)

Competition history
- Notable drivers: Dieter Quester

The Lola T110 was a Group 6 and Group 7 sports prototype race car, designed, developed, and built by British manufacturer Lola, specifically to compete in hill climb racing briefly alongside the T120, in 1967. It was powered by a 2.0 L (120 cu in) BMW Apfelbeck straight-four engine.

The name was also used for an unraced stillborn conceptual Formula One race car, which was planned to have been constructed in 1967 by Eric Broadley and John Surtees, but never raced.
