= Beppe Bigazzi =

Italian journalist (1933–2019)

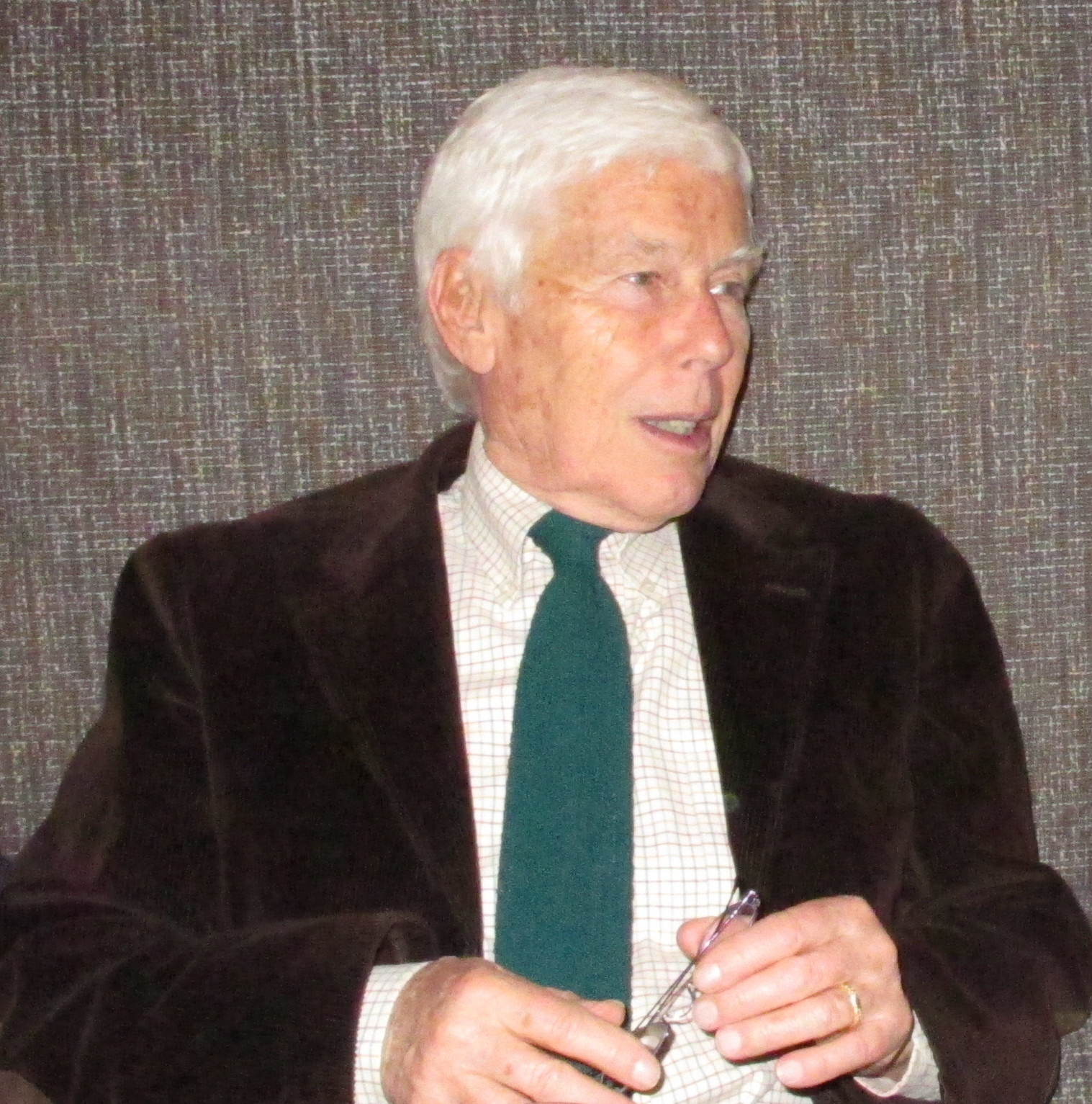
Bigazzi in 2010

Giuseppe "Beppe" Bigazzi (Terranuova Bracciolini, 20 January 1933 – Arezzo, 7 October 2019) was an Italian executive, journalist, television presenter and writer. He was a television presenter for the RAI show La prova del cuoco.

In February 2010, on a television cooking show, the Italian food writer Beppe Bigazzi mentioned that during the famine in World War II cat stew was a "succulent" and well-known dish in his home area of Valdarno, Tuscany. Later he claimed he had been joking, but added that cats used to be eaten in the area during famine periods, historically. He was widely criticised in the media for his comments and ultimately dropped from the television network.

== Biography ==
Graduated in 1959 from the Faculty of Political Science at the University of Florence with 110/110 cum laude and publication. Served in the military from 1960 to 1961 as an officer in the Italian Air Force at Perdasdefogu. From 1961 to 1966 he worked at the Bank of Italy.

He approached the world of journalism and publishing as early as 1961 when he was editor of the monthly magazine directed by Giulio Pastore, Il Nuovo Osservatore, and in 1963 he was vice-president of Idoc, a cultural association on the great monotheistic religions, with which he would edit a series of book and magazine series published by Arnoldo Mondadori Editore. In 1966 he edited, with Renzo De Felice, I Lavoratori dello Stato, a critical edition of Giulio Pastore's collection of writings and speeches.

In 1968, he was appointed deputy secretary general of the Committee of Ministers for the Mezzogiorno as well as a member of various interministerial committees for economic planning until 1970. In 1970 he was hired at ENI where he worked until 1993, when he retired, and during these years also became ENI's director of foreign relations (1970-1973), general manager and later CEO of Lanerossi (1973-1978), and president of various companies such as GEPI, Maserati, Innocenti, and Tirsotex. From 1984 to 1990 he was CEO of Agip and from 1990 to 1993 chairman of AGIP Coal and president of 53 AGIP companies.

He participated in the last four editions of the Mille Miglia, the 1954 Carrera Panamericana and three editions of the Targa Florio.

He began to dedicate himself to his passion for gastronomy by editing, from 1997 to 1999, the Luoghi di Delizia column in the newspaper Il Tempo; also in 1997 he published La Natura come Chef, which won the “Verdicchio d'oro” award.

On television he edited from 1995 to 2000 the column “La borsa della spesa” within the program Unomattina on Rai 1, and since 2000 he has been co-host of La prova del cuoco together with Antonella Clerici, also on the same channel. Later, he moved to Sky channel Alice, where he was co-host of the program Bischeri e bischerate. Since September 2013, he has made a permanent return to the cast of La Prova del cuoco.

He died in Rome at the age of 86 on October 7, 2019 from cancer.

== Books ==
- 1998 – La Cucina semplice dei Sapori d'Italia
- 1999 – Cinquanta itinerari italiani
- 2002 – La Farmacia e la Dispensa del Buon Dio
