= Bigazzi =

Bigazzi is an Italian surname. Notable people with the surname include:

- Beppe Bigazzi (1933–2019), Italian executive, journalist, television presenter and writer
- Giancarlo Bigazzi (1940–2012), Italian composer and author
- Luca Bigazzi (born 1958), Italian cinematographer
- Mirko Bigazzi (born 1989), Italian professional footballer
