= Flugplatz Mainz-Finthen =

Airport in Germany

Mainz-Finthen Airfield Flugplatz Mainz-Finthen
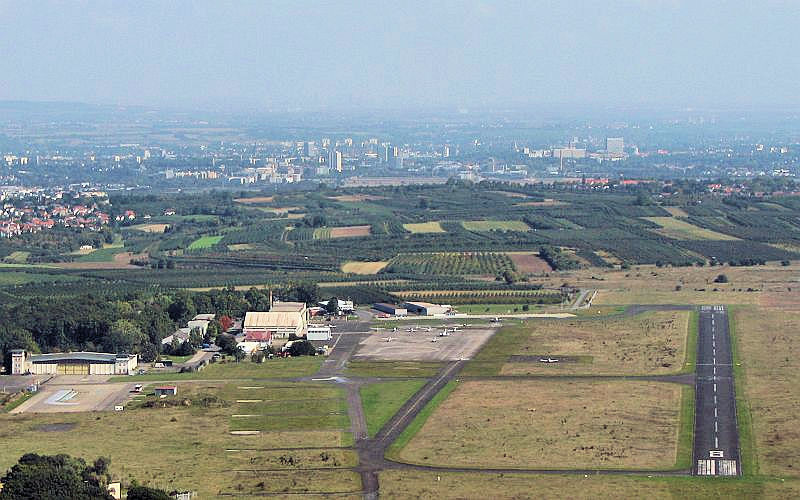
- IATA: none; ICAO: EDFZ

Summary
- Airport type: Civil
- Serves: Mainz, Germany
- Elevation AMSL: 525 ft / 160 m
- Coordinates: 49°58′08″N 008°08′47″E

Map

Runways
Direction	Length		Surface
Direction	m	ft	Surface
07/25	1,000	3,281	Asphalt
07R/25L	1,000	3,281	Grass

Mainz-Finthen Airfield (German: Flugplatz Mainz-Finthen) (ICAO: EDFZ) is a recreational aerodrome in Germany, located about 3 miles (5 km) southwest of Mainz and approximately 320 miles (510 km) southwest of Berlin.

The airfield serves the general aviation community, with no commercial airline service available. There are also a large number of sailplanes at the airfield. The operator is holding Flugplatz Mainz Betriebsgesellschaft mbH on behalf of the former operator of the Mainz Aviation Club.

== Facilities ==
In addition to the airfield operations, Mainz Finthen offers instructional training for helicopters, ultralight aircraft and gyrocopters. Powered flight and gliding training are also offered. The aerodrome has a modern refueling system offering AvGas, Jet-A1 and premium gasoline.

The United States Army operates a SIGINT station at the airport. The geographically closest US Army unit is the 66th Military Intelligence Brigade at Wiesbaden Army Airfield. US Army also maintains an urban warfare training facility consisting of a few houses at the Mainz Finthen airport.

The airfield has a commercial café and snack bar (open during summer flight season). The viewing platform offers a view over the flight operations.

== History ==
The aerodrome was first opened in 1939 as a Luftwaffe military airfield (Fliegerhorst Ober-Olm). It was seized by the United States Army in 1945, and used by the United States as a NATO facility (Finthen Army Airfield) until the end of the Cold War. In 1992, the military airfield was returned to the Federal German Government, which made it available to private operators as a civil aerodrome. A US Army Radar station and a training facility remained at the airport.

=== Luftwaffe use 1939–1945 ===
Originally named Fliegerhorst Ober-Olm, the airfield was built as a Luftwaffe military airfield, which opened in 1939. It was constructed by the Reich Labor Service from 1939 to 1942 as maintained by conscript laborers of the SS special camp Hinzert from 1942 until its capture by the United States Army in 1945.

During the early part of World War II, the Luftwaffe stationed several combat units at Ober-Olm during April and May 1940 in preparation for the attack in the West, those being:

- Jagdgeschwader 52 (JG 52), Messerschmitt Bf 109E fighters
- Jagdgeschwader 76 (JG 76), Messerschmitt Bf 109E fighters
- Kampfgeschwader 2 (KG 2), Dornier Do 17Z light bombers

From Ober-Olm JG 52 and 76 were involved in the air fighting during the Battle of France, both units moving west along with the advancing German forces. (KG 2) (Battle Wing 2) fielded 36 Dornier Do 17s, with 22 aircraft serviceable. KG2 supported German Army Group A's crossing of the river Meuse. It supported Heinz Guderian's Panzerkorps in the vicinity of Sedan during the battle of the 12–14 May. It also hit French Air Force airfields in Amiens, Reims, Champagne and Arras. It moved into France in early June.

After the combat in France ended, Ober-Olm became a "Defense of the Reich" airfield, with numerous night fighter units (NJG) moving in and out until the spring of 1945.

Allied army units moved into the Mainz area in mid-March 1945 as part of the Western Allied invasion of Germany and Ober-Olm airfield was attacked by Ninth Air Force Martin B-26 Marauder medium bombers and Republic P-47 Thunderbolt fighter-bombers to deny the retreating German forces use of the facility.

=== American wartime use 1945 ===
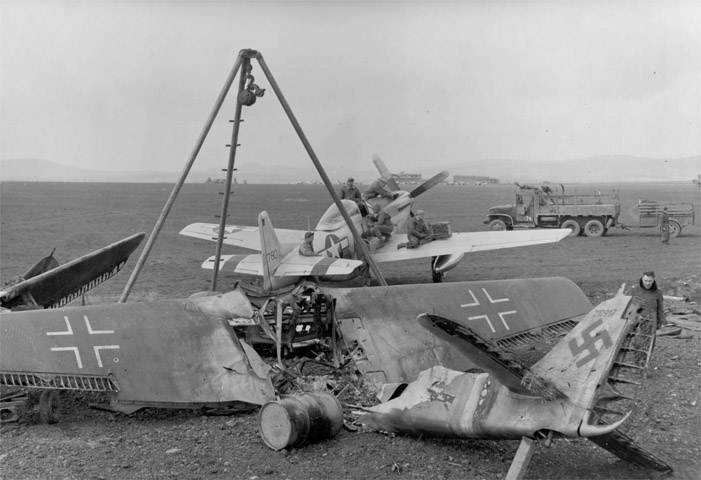
A 354th FG P-51D at Ober-Olm Airfield in April 1945.

The airfield was taken by elements of the XII Corps, 90th Division, of the Third United States Army under the command of General George S. Patton, Jr. on 22 March 1945. Combat engineers from IX Engineer command moved in with the 832d Engineering Aviation Battalion arriving on 25 March 1945, to repair the runway for use by combat aircraft. The engineers laid down a 5000' Square Mesh (SMT) all-weather runway over the existing east–west (07/25) bomb-cratered concrete runway, and laid out a second 4000' sod runway aligned 08/26. The engineers also performed minimal repairs to the facility to make it operational. On 27 March, the airfield was declared ready for Allied use and was designated as Advanced Landing Ground "Y-64 Ober Olm".

Once repaired, the Ninth Air Force 10th Reconnaissance Group of the United States Army Air Forces moved in, with photo-reconnaissance Lockheed P-38 Lightning (F-4) and North American P-51 Mustang (F-5) aircraft to provide forward tactical reconnaissance to Army ground units moving into central Germany. On 8 April, Republic P-47 Thunderbolts of the 354th Fighter Group moved in and attacked German army units, bridges and other ground targets of opportunity throughout Germany. In addition to the combat units, Douglas C-47 Skytrain transports used the grass runway for combat resupply and casualty evacuation (S&E) missions constantly, moving munitions and supplies up to the battlefield and evacuating wounded to rear areas.

With the end of the war, Ober Olm Airfield was closed on 20 June 1945. United States Army forces moved out of Ober Olm, as French forces moved into the Rhineland as part of their occupation zone of Germany.

=== Postwar/Cold War use ===
The airfield was taken over by the French military in July 1945, and engineers moved in to clear the wartime wreckage and rebuild the facility. The wartime runways were removed and a new, 1,000-metre-long asphalt runway was laid down. In the spring of 1949, the French withdrew from the Rhineland (Rhineland-Palatinate after 30 August 1946) as part of the establishment of the Federal Republic of Germany (German: Bundesrepublik Deutschland, BRD) on 23 May 1949.

As part of their commitment to NATO, US Armed forces returned to the Mainz area and took over the airfield, which was renamed Finthen Army Airfield. As a result of the establishment of the United States Air Force (USAF) in 1947, the Army could use the airfield for helicopters, light LSO and observation aircraft only.

Former stationed US Army units:

- 1960–1963 – 41 Transportation Battalion/245th Transport Company (medium helicopter) - 91st Transport Company (light helicopter) operating OH-13 Sioux and OH-23 Raven helicopters - 7th Army Transportation Depot.
- 1964–1977 – 8th Infantry Division/8th Aviation Battalion operating CH-34's, UH-1B's and OH-13's. Fixed-wing aircraft at the airfield included the U-1A Otter and the Bearcat.
- 1973–1987 – F-Detachment 62nd Aviation Company operating 4x UH-1H and 2x OH-58.
- 1969–1987 – 295th Aviation Company (10x CH-54 Tarhe heavy helicopters and 1x UH-1H Iroquois) and its support unit 326th Transportation Detachment.
- 1978–1987 – 8 Combat Aviation Battalion operating AH-1 Cobra helicopters activated on September 21, 1978 at Finthen Army Airfield with 5 companies and 116 helicopters. The battalion had 2 Attack Companies, 1 Combat Support Company and 1 Aviation Intermediate Maintenance Company (AVIM). Battalion HQ, attack and maintenance companies were located at Finthen Army Airfield. The Combat Support Company was dislocated at Bad Kreuznach and Baumholder Army Airfields. The CSC, with 41 aircraft, was the largest company in the battalion. Its mission was to support the divisional brigades, the Division Support Command, Division Artillery and the Division Command Group. The two attack companies, with 42x AH-1S Cobra/TOW, 6x UH-1 Utility, and 28x OH-58 Kiowa observation helicopters, gave the division a mobile and flexible anti-armor capability. The OH-58's and Cobras worked as teams, using nap-of-the-earth flight techniques. The division's anti-armor capability was increased with the highly maneuverable asset when integrated with armor and infantry. The AVIM kept all the aircraft mechanically combat ready to perform the missions.
- 1973–1988 – TRANSCOM/4th Transportation Brigade/205th Aviation Company (assault support) operating 16x CH-47 Chinook cargo helicopters and 2x UH-1H's. Primary mission was providing air transportation of sensitive cargo (special weapons) in Europe. Secondary mission was providing air transportation support to USAFE.

Supporting units:

- US Army 66th Aviation Company Air Traffic Control
- USAF 7th Weather Squadron, Detachment 12

On 16 and 17 November 1980, Holy Mass was celebrated by Pope John Paul II during his first major pastoral visit to Germany on the airfield with thousands of believers attending.

In the course of the war of the United States against Libya in 1986/87, the area was cordoned off because of the increased need for security fencing and militarily.

=== Current use ===
With the end of the Cold War and the subsequent reorganization of U.S. forces, Finthen Army Airfield began to be closed down beginning in December 1991. In September 1992 the airfield was decommissioned and the facility turned over the Federal Republic of Germany. Today however there is a small unit remaining which is being operated by the US Army 1st Military Intelligence Battalion. This TENCAP unit relocated in 2005 from Bad Aibling and is a SIGINT and IMINT gathering detachment which is operational from 2006. 1st Mil Intel Btn is under command of 66th Military Intelligence Brigade at the Lucius D. Clay Kaserne, Wiesbaden.

Since the withdrawal of the US Army, the airfield has been operated by the Mainz Aviation Club beginning in 1994, and on 1 August 2008, turned over to a commercial airport operator.

The airfield has numerous World War II relics, the largest being the wartime German hangar. Several concrete dispersal hardstands can be found to the north side of the runway, along with the wartime parking apron. On the south side of the runway the wartime grass runway is still in use, along with the outline many dispersal pads and taxiways still visible in the grass area south of the runway. In addition to the airfield, many of the buildings in the former support area date back to their German wartime origins.

== Mainz-Finthen Circuit ==
Mainz-Finthen Air Base Circuit
- Full Circuit without Hairpin (1971–1989)
- Location: Mainz, Rhineland-Palatinate
- Opened: 14 June 1964; 62 years ago
- Closed: 20 May 1990; 36 years ago
- Major events: DTM (1984–1990); German F3 (1973–1974, 1983–1984, 1988); DRM (1972–1983); Interserie (1975–1976)
- Website: https://www.edfz.de/

Full Circuit without Hairpin (1971–1989)
- Length: 2.150 km (1.336 mi)
- Turns: 7
- Race lap record: 0:46.790 ( (West Germany) Klaus Ludwig, Zakspeed C1/4, 1983, Group C)

Full Circuit with Hairpin (1964–1990)
- Length: 2.268 km (1.409 mi)
- Turns: 8
- Race lap record: 0:55.200 ( (Austria) Dieter Quester, Lola T110, 1968, Sports car racing)

From 1964 to 1990, the aerodrome hosted some car races, e.g. ″Internationales HMSC-Flugplatz-Rennen 1964″. From 1972 to 1983, the Deutsche Rennsport Meisterschaft raced in this circuit. The circuit also hosted the Deutsche Tourenwagen Meisterschaft races from 1984 to 1990.

=== Lap records ===
The fastest official race lap records at the Mainz-Finthen Airport circuit are listed as:

Category	Time	Driver	Vehicle	Event
Full Circuit without Hairpin (1971–1990): 2.150 km (1.336 mi)
Group C	0:46.790	Klaus Ludwig	Zakspeed C1/4	1983 Mainz-Finthen DRM round
Group 5	0:47.040	Klaus Ludwig	Ford Capri III Turbo	1982 Mainz-Finthen DRM round
Group 7	0:50.700	Peter Hoffmann	McLaren M8F	1976 Mainz-Finthen Interserie round
Formula Three	0:51.100	Willi Deutsch	March 733	1973 Mainz-Finthen German F3 round
Group 4	0:52.900	Tim Schenken	Porsche 934	1976 Mainz-Finthen DRM round
Group 2	0:54.600	Hans Heyer	Ford Capri RS	1973 Mainz-Finthen DRM round
Group B	0:56.200	Kurt König	BMW M1	1983 Mainz-Finthen DRM round
Full Circuit with Hairpin (1964–1990): 2.268 km (1.409 mi)
Sports car racing	0:55.200	Dieter Quester	Lola T110	1968 Mainz-Finthen International Sports Car race
Formula Three	0:55.530	Otto Rensing	Ralt RT3	1988 Mainz-Finthen German F3 round
Group A	1:00.060	Klaus Ludwig	Mercedes 190 E 2.5-16 Evo2	1990 Mainz-Finthen DTM round
Group 3	1:06.200	Franco Patria	Abarth Simca 2000	1964 Mainz-Finthen Deutsche Rundstrecken-Meisterschaft GT round

== See also ==
- Transport in Germany
- List of airports in Germany
- Flight school in Mainz Finthen
