= Michael Bartels =

German racing driver (born 1968)

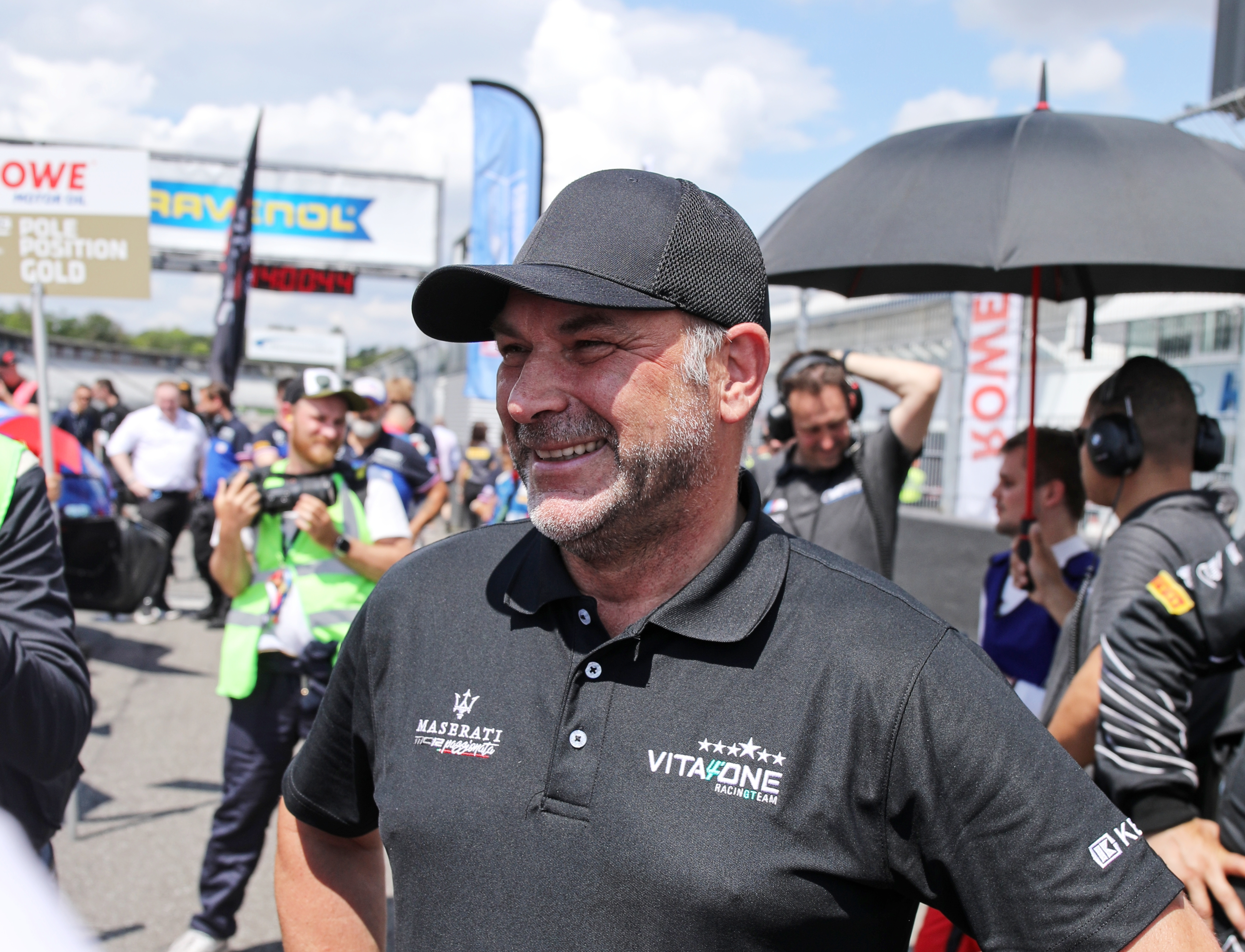
- Michael Bartels in Hockenheimring 2024
- Born: Michael Wilhelm Bartels; 8 March 1968 (age 58) Plettenberg, North Rhine-Westphalia, West Germany

FIA GT1 World Championship career
- Debut season: 2010
- Current team: Vitaphone Racing
- Categorisation: FIA Platinum (until 2018); FIA Gold (2019–)
- Car number: 18
- Starts: 38
- Wins: 8
- Poles: 3
- Fastest laps: 2
- Best finish: 1st in 2010

Formula One World Championship career
- Nationality: (Germany) German
- Active years: 1991
- Team: Lotus
- Entries: 4 (0 starts)
- Championships: 0
- Wins: 0
- Podiums: 0
- Career points: 0
- Pole positions: 0
- Fastest laps: 0
- First entry: 1991 German Grand Prix
- Last entry: 1991 Spanish Grand Prix

Previous series
- 2004-09 2004 2003 2000-02 1997-99 1994-1996 1990-93 1988-89 1986-87: FIA GT Championship; Le Mans Series; V8Star Series; DTM; Super Tourenwagen Cup; DTM; International Formula 3000; German F3; Formula Ford

Championship titles
- 1986 2006, 08-09 2010: German Formula Ford 1600; FIA GT Championship GT1; FIA GT1 World Championship

Michael Wilhelm Bartels (born 8 March 1968) is a German professional racing driver. He is an FIA GT1 world champion for Vitaphone and a former Grand Prix driver who attempted to qualify for four races in 1991 with Lotus.

== Career ==
Bartels was the 1985 German karting champion and the 1986 German Formula Ford 1600 champion. He competed in the German Formula Three Championship in 1988 and 1989, before stepping up to International Formula 3000 in 1990.

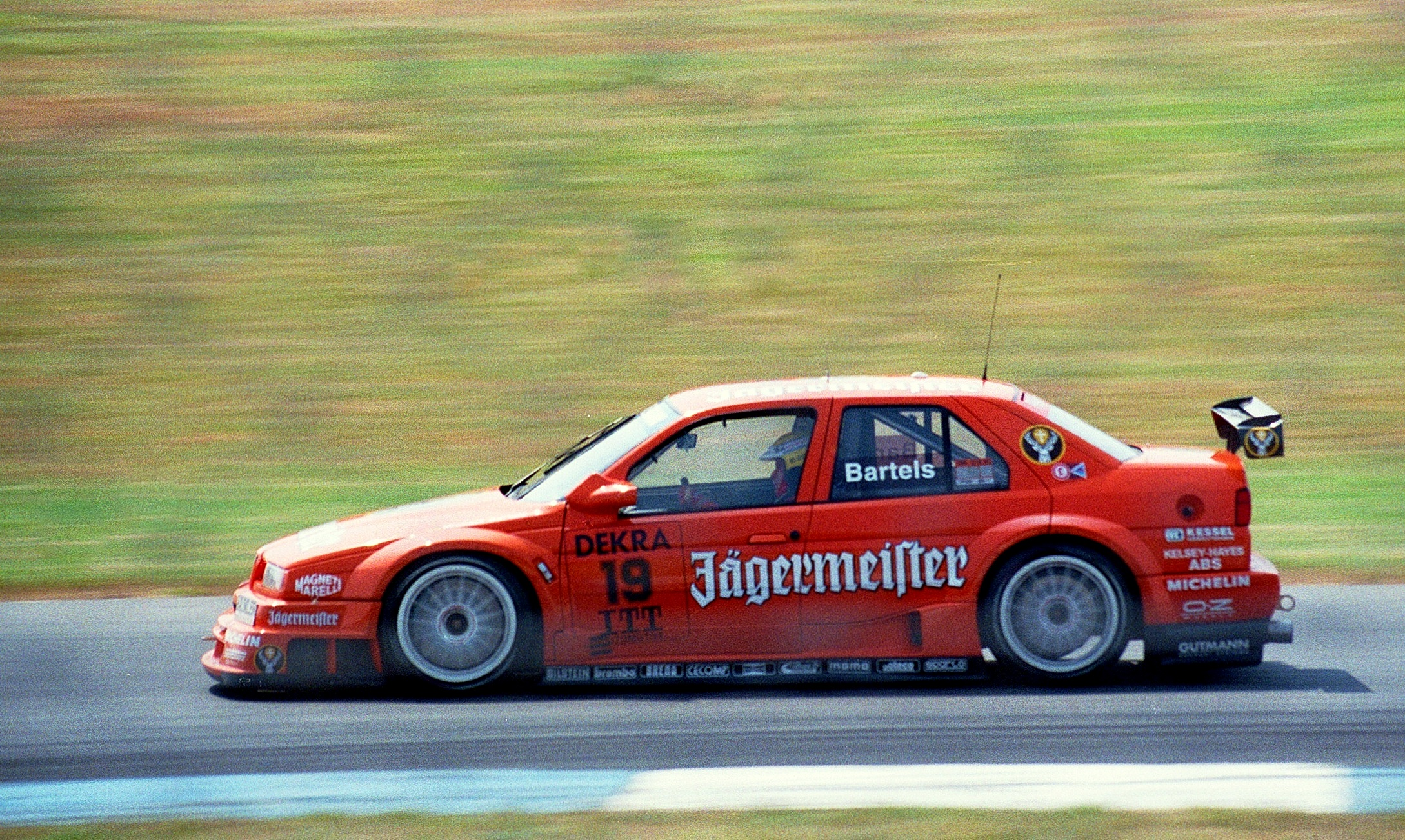
Michael Bartels' Alfa Romeo 155 V6 Ti exits Old Hairpin at Donington 1995

Bartels filled in at Lotus for Johnny Herbert, who had commitments in Japanese Formula 3000, at four Grands Prix during the 1991 Formula One season, but failed to qualify at all four races. Bartels continued in F3000, finishing fourth in 1992, before switching to the DTM in 1994, where he continued to race until the series ended at the end of 1996. Bartels raced in the Super Tourenwagen Cup for the next three years, before the DTM was resurrected in 2000. He won the 24 Hours Nürburgring in 2000 (in a works Porsche 911 GT3) and 2001 (in a Chrysler Viper GTS-R).

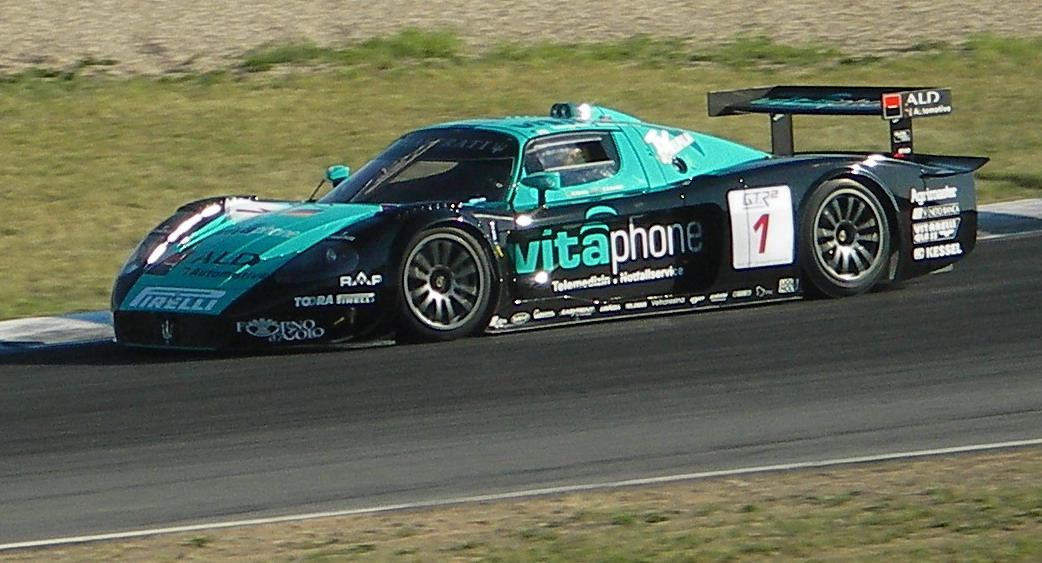
Michael Bartels in the Vitaphone Racing Maserati MC12 at Oschersleben 2006

After racing in the final year of the V8Star Series in 2003, finishing third behind Pedro Lamy and Thomas Mutsch, Bartels switched to the FIA GT Championship for 2004 with Konrad Motorsport (in a Saleen S7R). For the 2005 season, he began racing a Maserati MC12 for his own Bartels Motor & Sport team under the Vitaphone Racing banner, alongside compatriot Timo Scheider. Andrea Bertolini replaced Scheider for 2006 and the pairing won the championship in 2006, 2008 and 2009. Bartels also won the Spa 24 Hours in 2005, 2006 and 2008.

== Personal life ==
From 1992 to 1999, Bartels dated tennis player Steffi Graf.

== Racing record ==
=== Complete International Formula 3000 results ===
(key) (Races in bold indicate pole position) (Races in italics indicate fastest lap)

Year	Entrant	Chassis	Engine	1	2	3	4	5	6	7	8	9	10	11	Pos.	Pts
1990	CoBRa Motorsport	Reynard 90D	Mugen Honda	DON; 11	SIL; Ret	PAU; DSQ	JER; Ret	MNZ; Ret	PER; 7†	HOC; Ret	BRH; 11	BIR; Ret	BUG; 13	NOG; 6	22nd	1
1991	GA Motorsport	Ralt RT23	Ford Cosworth	VAL; DNQ											24th	0
1991	First Racing	Reynard 91D	Ford Cosworth		PAU; 8	JER; Ret	MUG; 15	PER	HOC	BRH	SPA	BUG	NOG		24th	0
1992	Crypton Engineering	Reynard 92D	Ford Cosworth	SIL; Ret	PAU; 2	CAT; Ret	PER; 4	HOC; 2	NÜR; 2	SPA; 3	ALB; Ret	NOG; Ret	MAG; DSQ		4th	25
1993	Pacific Racing	Reynard 93D	Ford Cosworth	DON; Ret	SIL; 3	PAU; Ret	**PER**; Ret	HOC; Ret	NÜR; Ret	SPA; Ret	MAG	NOG			11th	4

=== Complete Formula One results ===
(key) (Races in bold indicate pole position, races in italics indicate fastest lap)

Year	Entrant	Chassis	Engine	1	2	3	4	5	6	7	8	9	10	11	12	13	14	15	16	WDC	Pts
1991	Team Lotus	Lotus 102B	Judd EV 3.5 V8	USA	BRA	SMR	MON	CAN	MEX	FRA	GBR	GER; DNQ	HUN; DNQ	BEL	ITA; DNQ	POR	ESP; DNQ	JPN	AUS	NC	0

=== Complete Deutsche Tourenwagen Meisterschaft/Masters results ===
(key) (Races in bold indicate pole position) (Races in italics indicate fastest lap)

Year	Team	Car	1	2	3	4	5	6	7	8	9	10	11	12	13	14	15	16	17	18	19	20	21	22	23	24	Pos.	Pts
1987		Ford Sierra XR4 TI	HOC	ZOL	NÜR	AVU	MFA; 19	NOR	NÜR	WUN	DIE	SAL															NC	0
1994	Jägermeister Schübel Engineering	Alfa Romeo 155 V6 Ti	ZOL; 1 Ret	ZOL; 2 DNS	HOC; 1; 12	HOC; 2; 12	NÜR; 1 Ret	NÜR; 2; 14	MUG; 1; 9	MUG; 2; 8	NÜR; 1 Ret	NÜR; 2 DNS	NOR; 1; 8	NOR; 2; 9	DON; 1	DON; 2	DIE; 1; 12	DIE; 2 Ret	NÜR; 1; 12	NÜR; 2; 9	AVU; 1 Ret	AVU; 2 DNS	ALE; 1 Ret	ALE; 2 DNS	HOC; 1; 7	HOC; 2; 3	15th	23
1995	Euroteam	Alfa Romeo 155 V6 Ti	HOC; 1 Ret	HOC; 2 DNS	AVU; 1; 6	AVU; 2 Ret	NOR; 1; 10†	NOR; 2 Ret	**DIE**; **1**; 1	**DIE**; **2**; 1	NÜR; 1; 10	NÜR; 2 Ret	ALE; 1 Ret	ALE; 2 DNS	HOC; 1; 13	HOC; 2 Ret											10th	47
2000	Opel Team Phoenix	Opel Astra Coupé 2000	HOC; 1; 8	HOC; 2; 3	OSC; 1; 18	OSC; 2 Ret	NOR; 1; 5	NOR; 2; 5	SAC; 1; 6	SAC; 2; 6	NÜR; 1; 14	NÜR; 2; 10	OSC; 1; 7	OSC; 2; 5	NÜR; 1; 6	NÜR; 2; 8	HOC; 1; 4	HOC; 2; 3									7th	87
2001	Opel Team Holzer 2	Opel Astra Coupé 2001	HOC; QR; 14	HOC; CR; Ret	NÜR; QR; 20	NÜR; CR; 14	OSC; QR; 17	OSC; CR; 14	SAC; QR; 17	SAC; CR; 10	NOR; QR; 8	NOR; CR; 6	LAU; QR; 14	LAU; CR; Ret	NÜR; QR; 14	NÜR; CR; 11	A1R; QR; 8	A1R; CR; Ret	ZAN; QR; 18	ZAN; CR; 10	**HOC**; **QR**; 4	HOC; CR; 12					18th	8
2002	OPC Team Holzer	Opel Astra V8 Coupé 2002	HOC; QR; 13	HOC; CR; 14	ZOL; QR; 3	ZOL; CR; 8	DON; QR; 13	DON; CR; Ret	SAC; QR; 10	SAC; CR; 11	NOR; QR; DSQ	NOR; CR; 11	LAU; QR; 19	LAU; CR; 17	NÜR; QR; 19	NÜR; CR; 11	A1R; QR; 21	A1R; CR; 15	ZAN; QR; 10	ZAN; CR; Ret	HOC; QR; 16	HOC; CR; Ret					15th	1

- † — Retired, but was classified as he completed 90% of the winner's race distance.

=== Complete Super Tourenwagen Cup results ===
(key) (Races in bold indicate pole position) (Races in italics indicate fastest lap)

Year	Team	Car	1	2	3	4	5	6	7	8	9	10	11	12	13	14	15	16	17	18	19	20	Pos.	Pts
1994	Nissan Primera Racing	Nissan Primera eGT	AVU; 12	WUN; 7	ZOL; Ret	ZAN; 14	ÖST; 2	SAL; 4	SPA; 7	NÜR; Ret													6th	33
1997	Opel Team SMS	Opel Vectra	HOC; 1; 18	HOC; 2; 13	ZOL; 1; 17	ZOL; 2; 26	NÜR; 1; 8	NÜR; 2; 10	SAC; 1 Ret	SAC; 2 DNS	NOR; 1; 15	NOR; 2; 17	WUN; 1; 13	WUN; 2; 9	ZWE; 1; 16	ZWE; 2; 16	SAL; 1; 5	SAL; 2; 4	REG; 1; 10	REG; 2; 6	NÜR; 1; 4	NÜR; 2; 5	11th	263
1998	Peugeot Esso	Peugeot 406	HOC; 1	HOC; 2	NÜR; 1	NÜR; 2	SAC; 1	SAC; 2	NOR; 1	NOR; 2	REG; 1	REG; 2	WUN; 1	WUN; 2	ZWE; 1; 11	ZWE; 2; 8	SAL; 1; 10	SAL; 2; 3	OSC; 1; 15	OSC; 2; 9	NÜR; 1; 9	NÜR; 2; 14	19th	143
1999	Jever Audi-Team AZK Phoenix	Audi A4 Quattro	SAC; 1; 5	SAC; 2; 4	ZWE; 1; 6	ZWE; 2 Ret	OSC; 1; 6	OSC; 2; 13	NOR; 1; 6	NOR; 2; 5	MIS; 1; 7	MIS; 2; 6	NÜR; 1; 9	NÜR; 2; 6	SAL; 1; 8	SAL; 2; 7	OSC; 1; 11	OSC; 2; 7	HOC; 1; 4	HOC; 2; 2	NÜR; 1; 7	NÜR; 2; 4	7th	419

=== Complete International Touring Car Championship results ===
(key) (Races in bold indicate pole position) (Races in italics indicate fastest lap)

Year	Team	Car	1	2	3	4	5	6	7	8	9	10	11	12	13	14	15	16	17	18	19	20	21	22	23	24	25	26	Pos.	Pts
1995	Euroteam	Alfa Romeo 155 V6 Ti	MUG; 1; 13	MUG; 2 DNS	**HEL**; **1** Ret	HEL; 2 DNS	DON; 1; 19	DON; 2 Ret	EST; 1; 21†	EST; 2 DNS	MAG; 1; 18†	MAG; 2 DNS																	26th	0
1996	JAS Motorsport	Alfa Romeo 155 V6 TI	HOC; 1; 14	HOC; 2; 14	NÜR; 1; 11	NÜR; 2 Ret	EST; 1; 18	EST; 2 DNS	HEL; 1; 4	HEL; 2 Ret	NOR; 1 Ret	NOR; 2 DNS	DIE; 1; 8	DIE; 2 Ret	SIL; 1 DSQ	SIL; 2; 8	NÜR; 1; 15	NÜR; 2; 14	MAG; 1 Ret	MAG; 2 Ret	MUG; 1; 20†	MUG; 2 DNS	HOC; 1; 13	HOC; 2 Ret	INT; 1 Ret	INT; 2; 17	SUZ; 1; 15	SUZ; 2; 17†	21st	16

=== Complete GT1 World Championship results ===
Year	Team	Car	1	2	3	4	5	6	7	8	9	10	11	12	13	14	15	16	17	18	19	20	Pos.	Pts
2010	Vitaphone Racing Team	Maserati MC12	ABU; QR; 3	ABU; CR; 4	SIL; QR; 3	SIL; CR; 7	BRN; QR; 1	BRN; CR; 5	PRI; QR; 1	PRI; CR; 1	SPA; QR; Ret	SPA; CR; 7	NÜR; QR; 10	NÜR; CR; 6	ALG; QR; 2	ALG; CR; 1	NAV; QR; 7	NAV; CR; 6	INT; QR; 8	INT; CR; 9	SAN; QR; 12	SAN; CR; 7	**1st**	**138**
2012	BMW Team Vita4One	BMW Z4 (E89)	NOG; QR; 11	NOG; CR; 10	ZOL; QR; 1	ZOL; CR; 2	NAV; QR; 3	NAV; QR; 5	SVK; QR; 3	SVK; CR; 1	ALG; QR; 2	ALG; CR; 5	SVK; QR; 1	SVK; CR; 1	MOS; QR; 10	MOS; CR; 7	NÜR; QR; 4	NÜR; CR; 4	DON; QR; 9	DON; CR; 9			**3rd**	**144**

=== Complete Blancpain Sprint Series results ===
Year	Team	Car	Class	1	2	3	4	5	6	7	8	9	10	11	12	13	14	Pos.	Pts
2014	Vita4one Racing Team	BMW Z4 GT3	Pro-Am	NOG; QR	NOG; CR	BRH; QR	BRH; CR	ZAN; QR	ZAN; CR	SVK; QR	SVK; CR	ALG; QR	ALG; CR	ZOL; QR; 18	ZOL; CR; 16	BAK; QR	BAK; CR	55th	0

Sporting positions
Preceded by Joachim Winkelhock	Guia Race; Winner; 1999	Succeeded by Patrick Huisman
Preceded by Gabriele Gardel	FIA GT Championship; Champion; 2006; With: Andrea Bertolini	Succeeded by Thomas Biagi
Preceded by Thomas Biagi	FIA GT Championship; Champion; 2008-2009; With: Andrea Bertolini	Succeeded by None (Series Ended)
Preceded by Inaugural	FIA GT1 World Championship; Champion; 2010; With: Andrea Bertolini	Succeeded by Lucas Luhr; Michael Krumm
