= Laurent Aïello =

French racing driver (born 1969)

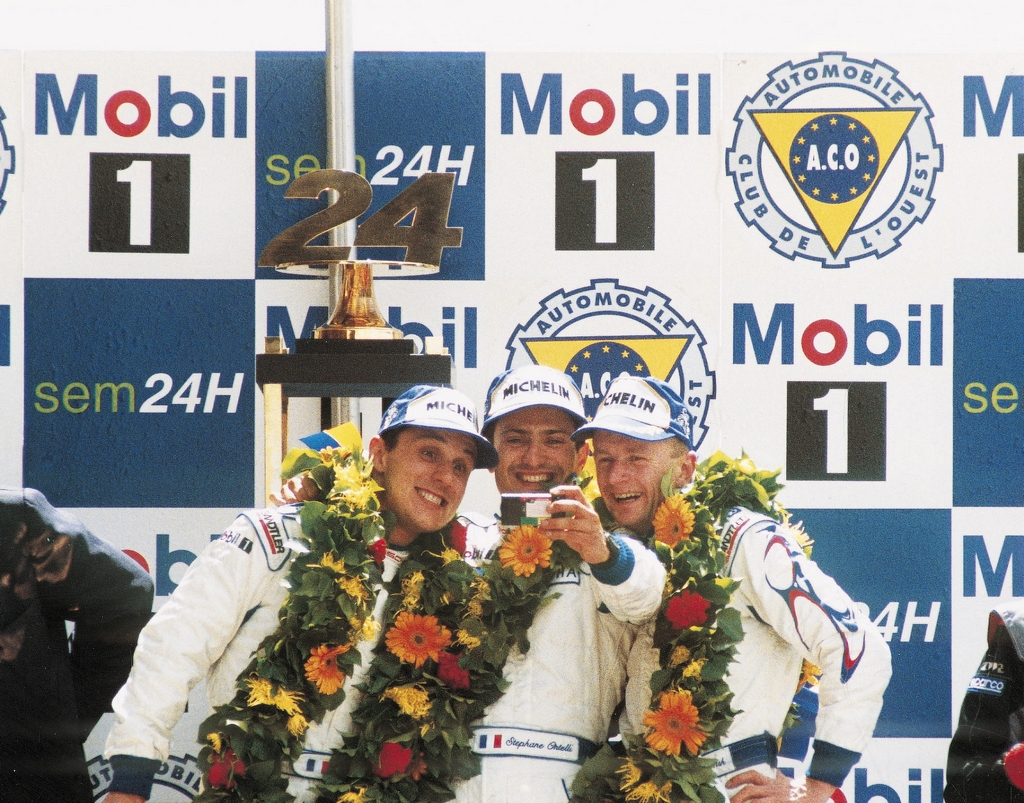
- Aïello (left) on the podium at the 1998 24 Hours of Le Mans endurance race
- Nationality: (France) French
- Born: 23 May 1969 (age 57) Fontenay-aux-Roses, France
- Retired: 2005

DTM
- Years active: 2000–2005
- Former teams: Abt Sportsline; Team Phoenix
- Starts: 79
- Championships: 1 (2002)
- Wins: 13
- Podiums: 22
- Poles: 7
- Fastest laps: 8

Previous series
- 1999 1998–2001 1996–1998 1996 1993 1993–1995 1991–1992 1989–1992 1988 1983-1985: BTCC; 24 Hours of Le Mans; STW; Porsche Carrera Cup France; Italian Superturismo; French Supertouring Championship; International Formula 3000; French Formula 3 Volant Avia; French Karting Championship

Championship titles
- 2002 1999 1998 1997 1994 1992 1983–1985: DTM; BTCC; 24 Hours of Le Mans; STW; French Supertouring Championship; French Formula 3 French Karting Championship

24 Hours of Le Mans career
- Years: 1998 – 2001
- Teams: Porsche AG; Audi Sport Team Joest; Audi Sport North America
- Best finish: 1st (1998)
- Class wins: 1 (1998)

Laurent Aïello (born 23 May 1969) is a French former race car driver, most notable for winning the 24 Hours of Le Mans in 1998, the British Touring Car Championship (BTCC) in 1999, and the Deutsche Tourenwagen Masters (DTM) series in 2002.

Aïello's racing career lasted from 1988 until 2005, and, in addition to the 24 Hours of Le Mans, the BTCC and DTM, saw him enter the International Formula 3000, the French Supertouring Championship (CFS), the Italian Super Touring Championship (ISTC), and the Super Tourenwagen Cup (STW), in addition to several other series. He took the CFS title in 1994, and the STW title in 1997.

== Career ==
=== Early career ===
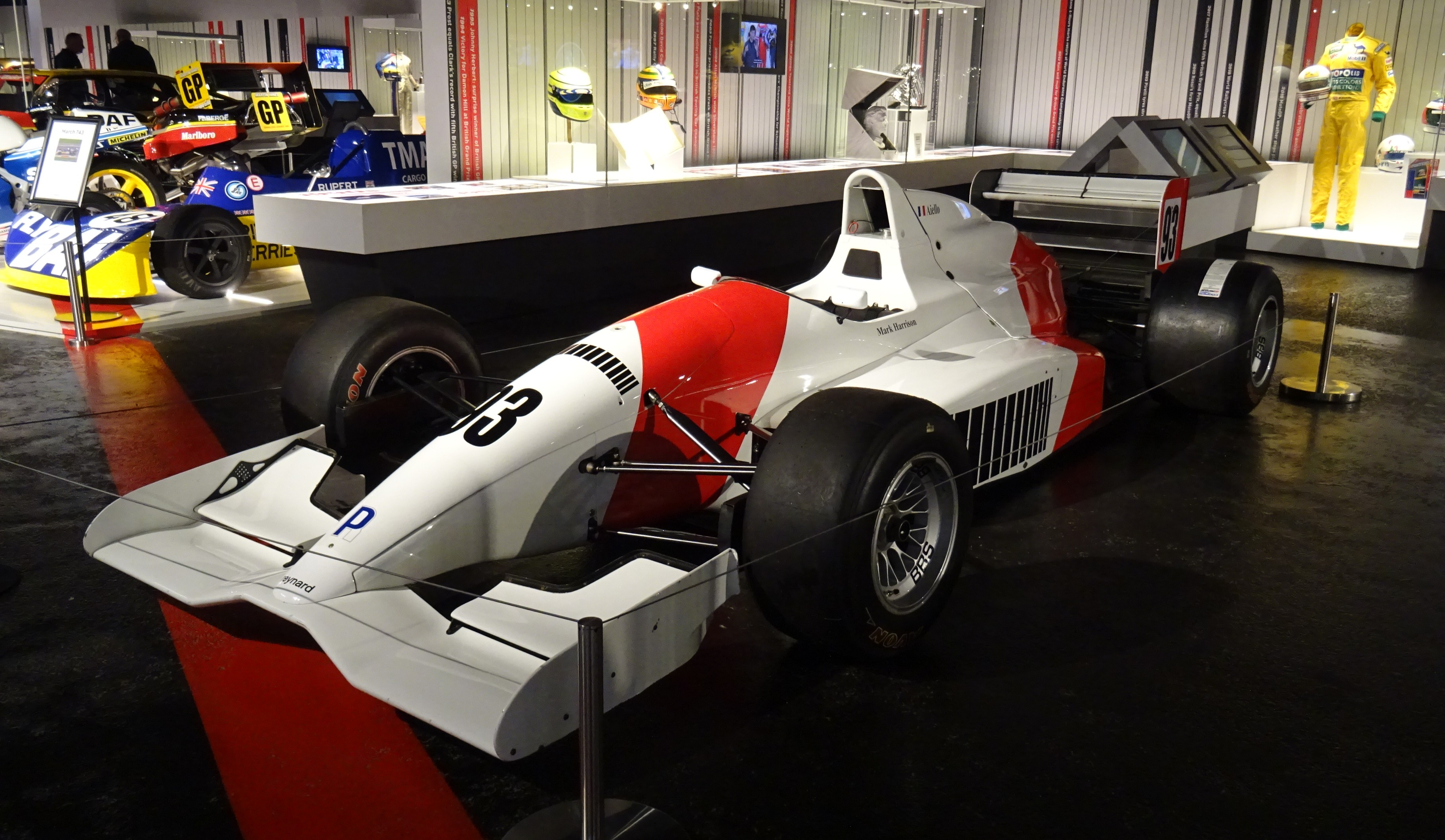
Aïello's 1992 F3000 Reynard 92D

Aïello won the French Karting Championship for three years in a row, in 1983, 1984, and 1985. He made his car racing debut in 1988 in the Volant Avia, and his professional racing debut in 1989, entering 11 rounds of the French Formula 3, driving for Daniel Gache Racing, with his best result being a solitary podium. In 1990 Aïello won the Monaco Grand Prix Formula Three support race, in addition to finishing fourth in the Macau GP for Bowman Racing, and fifth in the French F3 for Graff Racing, with four wins from 11 races. He moved to the International Formula 3000 for 1991 and 1992 (for DAMS and Pacific Racing, respectively) but he was not successful, finishing 15th overall in both seasons. He did, however, take the 1992 French Formula 3 title.

=== 1993-1996 ===
In 1993, Aïello switched to touring car racing in the French Supertouring Championship (CFS), finishing runner up, whilst driving for the non-works team Oreca. Also during this year, he also entered the Italian Super Touring Championship, finishing 17th overall, with 11 points. His first title was the 1994 French Supertouring Championship, where he won five races driving for the works Peugeot team in their 405 MI-16 model. Due to Peugeot's links with Jordan Grand Prix, he tested a Jordan 194 Formula 1 car in an Estoril test session, and set the tenth fastest time. After a less-successful 1995 season, where he finished third overall, and won just one race, he made the switch to the Super Tourenwagen Cup (STW) in Germany for 1996, still driving for Peugeot, but in their new 406 model, following their withdrawal from the CFS. He finished third overall in this first season, with three wins. He also entered a round of the Porsche Carrera Cup France, winning the race.

=== 1997-1999 ===
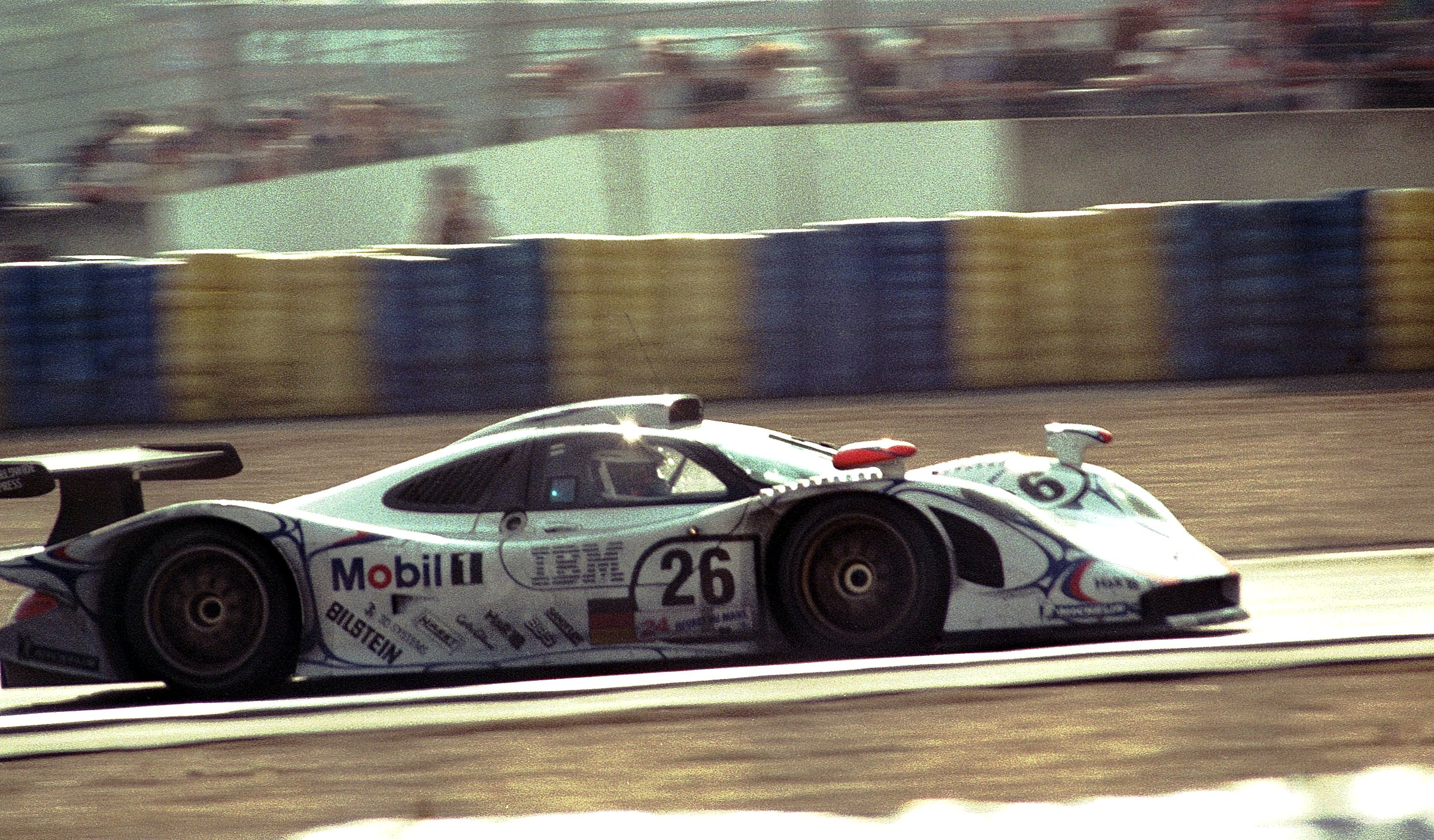
Aïello in his 1998 Le Mans winning 911 GT1-98

Aïello took the STW title for the first time in 1997, with 11 wins, finishing 52 points ahead of BMW's Joachim Winkelhock. 1998 would be his third and final season in the STW, with six wins only being enough for a second place, with the Venezuelan driver Johnny Cecotto beating him by just three points. During the 1998 season, he won the 24 Hours of Le Mans race in a Porsche 911 GT1, his first attempt at the endurance race.

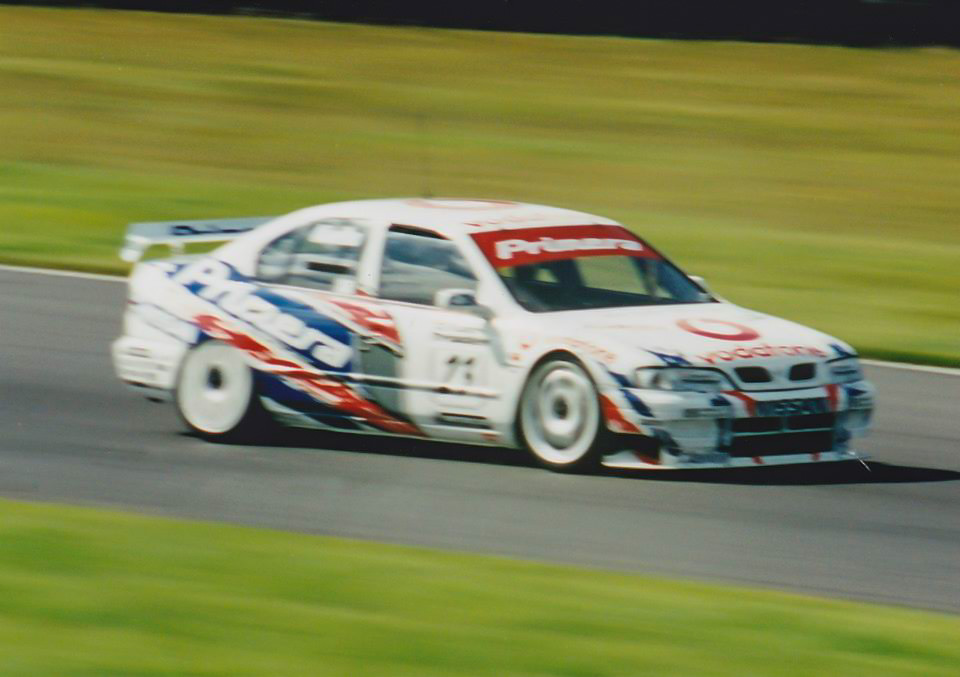
Aïello at Donington Park in his title-winning year of 1999

For 1999, Aïello switched to the British Touring Car Championship (BTCC), driving for the works Nissan team in their Primera model, replacing the outgoing Anthony Reid, who had moved to Ford. He had initially been offered the drive at Renault, but rejected the offer as WilliamsF1, who ran the team, refused to allow him to enter the 24 Hours of Le Mans. The season would prove to be highly successful, as he took the title in his one and only season in the series, with ten wins helping him finish 16 points ahead of teammate David Leslie, and Nissan taking a comfortable Manufacturer's and Team's championship victory. His performances in the BTCC saw him win the National Racing Driver of the Year award in the Autosport Awards. He also entered the 24 Hours of Le Mans in 1999, this time for Audi in their Audi R8R, and he finished third in class.

=== 2000-2002 ===
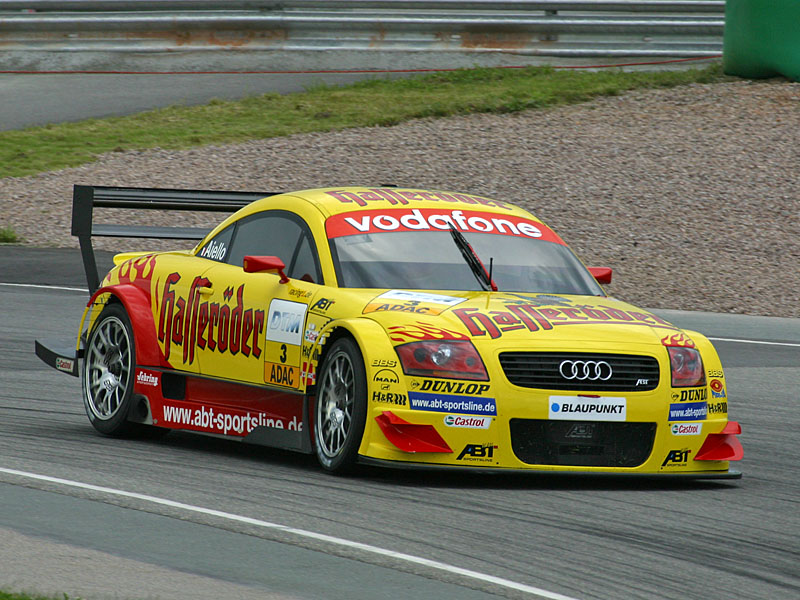
Aïello at the Sachsenring in 2002, his championship year in the DTM.

Following Nissan's withdrawal from the BTCC at the end of the 1999 season, a potential drive for Honda fell through (that spot being taken by Tom Kristensen), Aïello made the switch to the new Deutsche Tourenwagen Masters series, driving for the Abt Sportsline team in their Audi TT-R, a move that surprised some. The first season was unsuccessful, with no victories, as the Audi TT proved to be uncompetitive against the faster Mercedes-Benz CLK and Opel Astra rivals, its best finish being Aïello's fifth place at the second Oschersleben sprint race. He entered his third 24 Hours of Le Mans, driving for Audi, and finished second.

Following heavy development on the car, 2001 would prove to be more successful: Aïello was the first member of the Abt team to win in the series, at the Nürburgring sprint race. He would take 3 more victories that season, all three at the Nürburgring. He once more returned to the 24 Hours of Le Mans with Audi, and finished second once more.

2002 would be an even more successful year — Aïello defeated reigning champion Bernd Schneider to take the title by six points, winning 12 races in the process. Although initially signed to drive once more for Audi in the 2002 edition of the 24 Hours of Le Mans, he would not appear, with Christian Pescatori being entered instead.

=== 2003-2005 ===
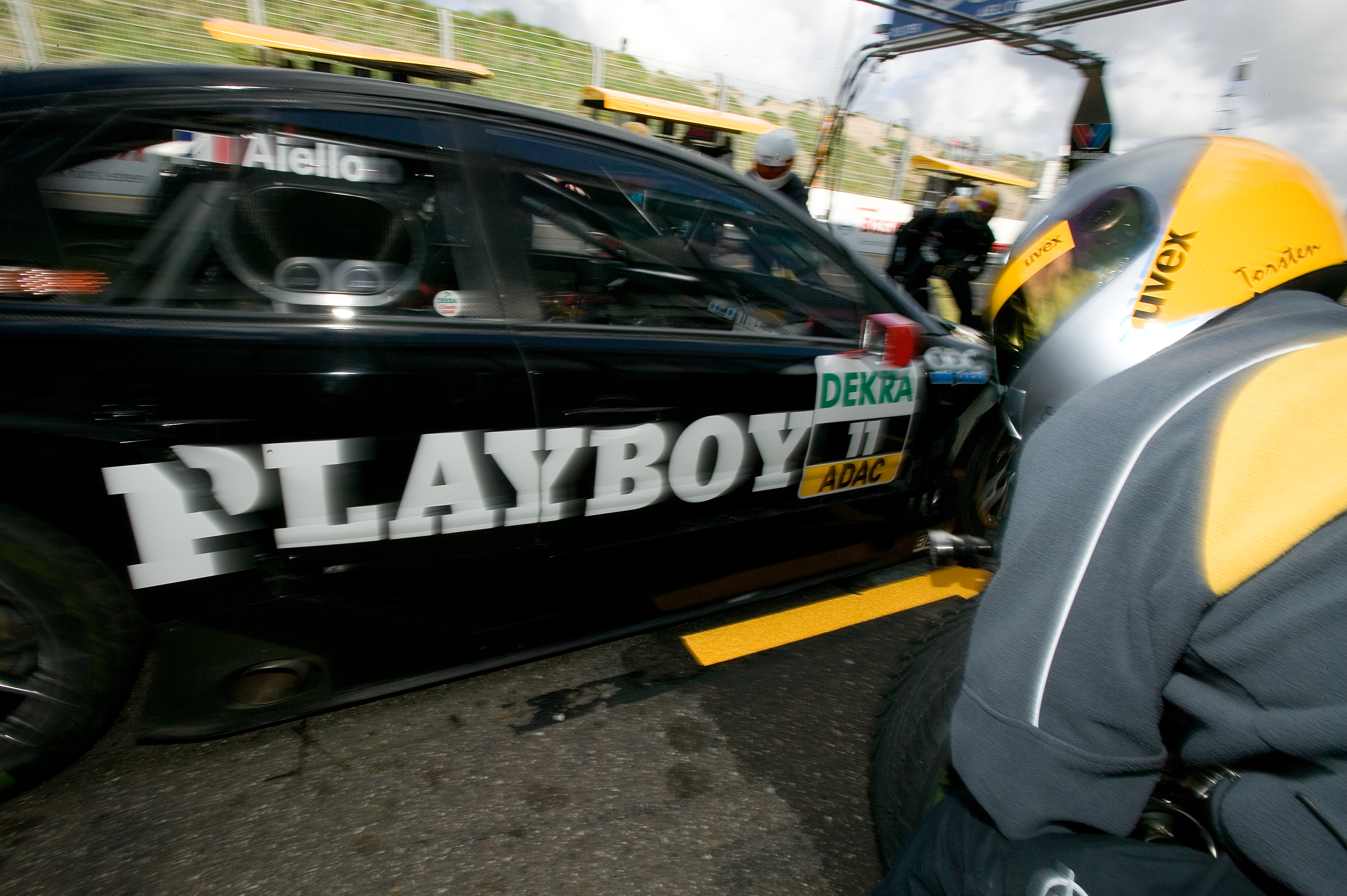
Aiello in the pits at Circuit Zandvoort in 2005

Abt Sportsline, and Aïello, would be much less successful in 2003, winning just one race, and after switching to Opel for the 2004 and 2005 seasons, without any further victories (the firm's new Vectra GTS proved to be unsuccessful), Aïello announced his retirement from racing at the end of the season, aged 36, finishing ninth in his final race at Hockenheim. During his final season, he tested a "breathable overall" at the Nürburgring round.

In a 2005 poll run by Motorsport Magazine, Aïello was voted the 13th best touring car driver of all time.

== Personal life ==
Aïello is married to Géraldine and has two children: a daughter named Marie, and a son named Tom. He has a passion for jetskis, and enjoys DJing.

== Racing record ==
=== Complete International Formula 3000 results ===
(key) (Races in bold indicate pole position; races in italics indicate fastest lap.)

Year	Entrant	Chassis	Engine	1	2	3	4	5	6	7	8	9	10	DC	Points
1991	DAMS	Lola T91/50	Mugen	VAL; Ret	PAU; DNS	JER; 7	MUG; Ret	PER; Ret	HOC; 7	BRH; 9	**SPA**; 3	BUG; Ret	NOG; Ret	15th	4
1992	Pacific Racing	Reynard 92D	Mugen	SIL; Ret	PAU; Ret	CAT; 15	PER; 11	HOC; 10	NÜR; 5	SPA; 6	ALB; 15	NOG; 7	MAG; Ret	15th	3

=== Complete 24 Hours of Le Mans results ===
Year	Team	Co-Drivers	Car	Class	Laps	Pos.	Class Pos.
1998	(Germany) Porsche AG	(United Kingdom) Allan McNish (Monaco) Stephane Ortelli	Porsche 911 GT1-98	GT1	351	**1st**	**1st**
1999	(Germany) Audi Sport Team Joest	(Italy) Michele Alboreto (Italy) Rinaldo Capello	Audi R8R	LMP	346	4th	**3rd**
2000	(Germany) Audi Sport Team Joest	(United Kingdom) Allan McNish (Monaco) Stephane Ortelli	Audi R8	LMP900	367	**2nd**	**2nd**
2001	(Germany) Audi Sport North America	(Italy) Rinaldo Capello (Italy) Christian Pescatori	Audi R8	LMP900	320	**2nd**	**2nd**

=== Complete Super Tourenwagen Cup results ===
(key) (Races in bold indicate pole position; races in italics indicate fastest lap)

Year	Team	Car	1	2	3	4	5	6	7	8	9	10	11	12	13	14	15	16	17	18	19	20	Pos	Pts
1996	Peugeot Esso	Peugeot 406	ZOL; 1; 20	ZOL; 2 Ret	ASS; 1; 2	ASS; 2; 1	HOC; 1 Ret	HOC; 2 DNS	SAC; 1; 9	SAC; 2; 6	WUN; 1; 9	WUN; 2; 2	ZWE; 1; 1	ZWE; 2; 1	SAL; 1; 7	SAL; 2; 4	AVU; 1; 14	AVU; 2; 12	NÜR; 1; 2	NÜR; 2; 2			3rd	422
1997	Peugeot Esso	Peugeot 406	HOC; 1; 1	HOC; 2; 1	ZOL; 1; 3	ZOL; 2; 3	NÜR; 1; 1	NÜR; 2; 1	SAC; 1; 2	SAC; 2; 2	NOR; 1; 2	NOR; 2 Ret	WUN; 1; 1	WUN; 2; 1	ZWE; 1; 1	ZWE; 2; 4	SAL; 1; 1	SAL; 2; 1	REG; 1; 2	REG; 2; 20	NÜR; 1; 1	NÜR; 2; 1	1st	696
1998	Peugeot Esso	Peugeot 406	HOC; 1; 4	HOC; 2; 2	NÜR; 1; 4	NÜR; 2; 3	SAC; 1; 3	SAC; 2; 5	NOR; 1; 6	NOR; 2; 1	REG; 1; 12	REG; 2; 10	WUN; 1; 1	WUN; 2 Ret	ZWE; 1; 3	ZWE; 2; 5	SAL; 1; 1	SAL; 2; 1	OSC; 1; 1	OSC; 2; 1	NÜR; 1; 3	NÜR; 2; 6	2nd	592

=== Complete British Touring Car Championship results ===
(key) (Races in bold indicate pole position – 1 point awarded all races) (Races in italics indicate fastest lap) (* signifies that driver lead feature race for at least one lap – 1 point awarded)

Year	Team	Car	1	2	3	4	5	6	7	8	9	10	11	12	13	14	15	16	17	18	19	20	21	22	23	24	25	26	Pos	Pts
1999	Vodafone Nissan Racing	Nissan Primera GT	DON; 1; 11	DON; 2 Ret	SIL; 1; 1	**SIL**; **2**; 6	THR; 1; 1	THR; 2; 1*	BRH; 1; 3	**BRH**; **2**; 1*	**OUL**; **1**; 1	**OUL**; **2**; 1*	DON; 1 Ret	DON; 2; 2*	CRO; 1; 5	CRO; 2; 3	**SNE**; **1** Ret	**SNE**; **2**; 7	THR; 1; 1	THR; 2; 5*	**KNO**; **1**; 1	KNO; 2 DSQ	**BRH**; **1**; 2	BRH; 2; 1*	OUL; 1; 1	OUL; 2; 2	**SIL**; **1**; 9	**SIL**; **2** Ret	**1st**	**244**

=== Complete Deutsche Tourenwagen Masters results ===
(key) (Races in bold indicate pole position) (Races in italics indicate fastest lap)

Year	Team	Car	1	2	3	4	5	6	7	8	9	10	11	12	13	14	15	16	17	18	19	20	Pos.	Pts
2000	Abt Sportsline	Abt-Audi TT-R	HOC; 1; 15	HOC; 2 DNS	OSC; 1	OSC; 2	NOR; 1 Ret	NOR; 2 DNS	SAC; 1; 12	SAC; 2; 14	NÜR; 1; 11	NÜR; 2; 14	OSC; 1; 5	OSC; 2; 11	NÜR; 1; 9	NÜR; 2; 7	HOC; 1 Ret	HOC; 2 DNS					16th	14
2001	Abt Sportsline	Abt-Audi TT-R	HOC; QR; 8	HOC; CR; 7	**NÜR**; **QR**; 1	**NÜR**; **CR**; 1	OSC; QR; 2	OSC; CR; 5	SAC; QR	SAC; CR	NOR; QR; 10	NOR; CR; 12	LAU; QR; 6	LAU; CR; 12	**NÜR**; **QR**; 1	**NÜR**; **CR**; 1	A1R; QR; 4	A1R; CR; 2	ZAN; QR; 5	ZAN; CR; Ret	HOC; QR; Ret	HOC; CR; DNS	5th	75
2002	Abt Sportsline	Abt-Audi TT-R	**HOC**; **QR**; 2	HOC; CR; 1	ZOL; QR; 1	**ZOL**; **CR**; 1	DON; QR; 18	DON; CR; DSQ	**SAC**; **QR**; 1	**SAC**; **CR**; 1	NOR; QR; 4	NOR; CR; 1	**LAU**; **QR**; 1	**LAU**; **CR**; 4	NÜR; QR; 2	NÜR; CR; 2	**A1R**; **QR**; 3	A1R; CR; 5	**ZAN**; **QR**; DSQ	ZAN; CR; 6	HOC; QR; 1	**HOC**; **CR**; 6	**1st**	**70**
2003	Abt Sportsline	Abt-Audi TT-R	HOC; 3	ADR; 3	NÜR; 3	LAU; 8	NOR; 6	DON; Ret	NÜR; 1	A1R; 4	ZAN; 9	HOC; 5											6th	41
2004	OPC Team Phoenix	Opel Vectra GTS V8 2004	HOC; 9	EST; 8	ADR; 6	LAU; 4	NOR; Ret	SHA^{1}	NÜR; 9	OSC; 6	ZAN; Ret	BRN; 15	HOC; Ret										10th	12
2005	OPC Team Phoenix	Opel Vectra GTS V8 2005	HOC; Ret	LAU; 10	SPA; 7	BRN; 16	OSC; 7	NOR; 12†	NÜR; 9	ZAN; 14	LAU; 4	IST; 6	HOC; 9										11th	12

^{1} – A non-championship one-off race was held in 2004, in Shanghai, China.

- † — Retired, but was classified as he completed 90% of the winner's race distance.

Awards and achievements
Preceded by Rickard Rydell	Autosport; National Racing Driver of the Year; 1999	Succeeded by Antônio Pizzonia
Sporting positions
Preceded by Antonio Tamburini	Monaco Formula Three; Race Winner; 1990	Succeeded by Jörg Müller
Preceded by Frank Biela	French Touring Car Champion; 1994	Succeeded by Yvan Muller
Preceded by Emanuele Pirro	Super Tourenwagen Cup Champion; 1997	Succeeded by Johnny Cecotto
Preceded by Michele Alboreto; Stefan Johansson; Tom Kristensen	Winner of the 24 Hours of Le Mans; 1998 with: Allan McNish; Stéphane Ortelli	Succeeded by Pierluigi Martini; Yannick Dalmas; Joachim Winkelhock
Preceded by Rickard Rydell	British Touring Car Champion; 1999	Succeeded by Alain Menu
Preceded by Bernd Schneider	DTM Champion; 2002	Succeeded by Bernd Schneider
