= 1998 Super Tourenwagen Cup =

Motorsport season

Seasons
- ← 1997 1999 →

The 1998 ADAC Deutsche Super Touren Wagen-Cup was the fifth edition of the Super Tourenwagen Cup (STW).

== Season summary ==
After an open start to the season with four different winners in the first four races, BMW driver Johnny Cecotto and reigning champion and Peugeot driver Laurent Aïello soon emerged as the two championship contenders. Cecotto built up a sizeable lead during the season, but a late four-race winning streak ahead of the final weekend helped Aiello close the gap. After finishing third in the sprint race at the final event, one place ahead of Cecotto, Aiello passed Cecotto in the championship and led his Venezuelan rival by a single point before the deciding feature race. In that race, Cecotto would go on to finish fourth, two places ahead of Aiello, allowing him to claim the title.

== Teams and drivers ==
Team	Car	No	Drivers	Rounds	Class
(France) Peugeot Esso	Peugeot 406	1	(France) Laurent Aïello	All	M
(France) Peugeot Esso	Peugeot 406	2	(Germany) Jörg van Ommen	All	M
(Germany) Paulaner Team Holzer	Opel Vectra	3	(Germany) Alexander Burgstaller	All	M
(Germany) Opel Team Holzer	Opel Vectra	4	(Germany) Uwe Alzen	All	M
(Germany) Abt Sportsline	Audi A4	5	(Italy) Emanuele Pirro	All	M
(Germany) TNT Team SMS	Opel Vectra	6	(France) Éric Hélary	All	M
(Germany) Opel Team SMS	Opel Vectra	7	(Germany) Manuel Reuter	All	M
(Germany) BMW Team Schnitzer	BMW 320i	8	(Germany) Joachim Winkelhock	All	T
(Germany) BMW Team Schnitzer	BMW 320i	9	(Venezuela) Johnny Cecotto	All	T
(Italy) Euroteam	Alfa Romeo 156	10	(Italy) Stefano Modena	All	T
(Italy) JAS Team Honda Sport	Honda Accord	11	(Italy) Gabriele Tarquini	All	M
(Italy) JAS Team Honda Sport	Honda Accord	12	(Denmark) Tom Kristensen	All	M
(Germany) Mamerow Racing Team	Audi A4 Quattro	14	(Germany) Peter Mamerow	1-4	T
(Germany) Mamerow Racing Team	BMW 320i	14	(Germany) Peter Mamerow	5-10	T
(Germany) Oliver Mayer Motorsport	Audi A4 Quattro	15	(Germany) Oliver Mayer	1-4, 6-7, 9-10	T
(Germany) Auto Dienst Bemani Team	Opel Vectra	16	(Germany) Marco Bromberger	1-5, 7-10	T
(Germany) Auto Plus Bemani Team	Opel Vectra	17	(Germany) Klaus Niedzwiedz	All	T
(Germany) Abt Sportsline	Audi A4	18	(Germany) Christian Abt	All	M
(Germany) Irmscher Motorsport	Opel Vectra	19	(Germany) Franz Engstler	All	T
(Italy) Alfa Corse	Alfa Romeo 156	20	(Italy) Nicola Larini	4	T
(France) Peugeot Esso	Peugeot 406	21	(Germany) Michael Bartels	7-10	M
(Germany) Nissan Primera Racing	Nissan Primera GT	22	(Germany) Michael Krumm	All	M
(Germany) Nissan Primera Racing	Nissan Primera GT	23	(Germany) Roland Asch	All	M
(Germany) Team Isert	BMW 320i	25	(Germany) Leopold Prinz von Bayern	All	T
(Germany) Team Isert	BMW 320i	26	(Germany) Christian Menzel	All	T
(Italy) Alfa Corse	Alfa Romeo 156	30	(Italy) Fabrizio Giovanardi	4	T
(Germany) Abt Sportsline	Audi A4	45	(Germany) Frank Biela	All	M

Icon	Class
M	Drivers eligible to score points in the Manufactures Trophy
T	Drivers eligible to score points in the Team Trophy

== Race calendar and results ==
Round		Circuit	Date	Pole position	Winning driver	Winning team
1	R1	(Germany) Hockenheimring	19 April	(France) Laurent Aïello	(Germany) Uwe Alzen	Opel Team Holzer
1	R2	(Germany) Hockenheimring	19 April		(Germany) Manuel Reuter	Opel Team SMS
2	R1	(Germany) Nürburgring	10 May	(Germany) Roland Asch	(Germany) Roland Asch	Nissan Primera Racing
2	R2	(Germany) Nürburgring	10 May		(Venezuela) Johnny Cecotto	BMW Team Schnitzer
3	R1	(Germany) Sachsenring	24 May	(Venezuela) Johnny Cecotto	(Venezuela) Johnny Cecotto	BMW Team Schnitzer
3	R2	(Germany) Sachsenring	24 May		(Venezuela) Johnny Cecotto	BMW Team Schnitzer
4	R1	(Germany) Norisring	6 July	(France) Éric Hélary	(Germany) Jörg van Ommen	Peugeot Esso
4	R2	(Germany) Norisring	6 July		(France) Laurent Aïello	Peugeot Esso
5	R1	(Germany) Lahr	19 July	(Germany) Uwe Alzen	(Germany) Uwe Alzen	Opel Team Holzer
5	R2	(Germany) Lahr	19 July		(Italy) Gabriele Tarquini	JAS Team Honda Sport
6	R1	(Germany) Wunstorf	2 August	(Germany) Manuel Reuter	(France) Laurent Aïello	Peugeot Esso
6	R2	(Germany) Wunstorf	2 August		(Germany) Manuel Reuter	Opel Team SMS
7	R1	(Germany) Zweibrücken	16 August	(Germany) Manuel Reuter	(Venezuela) Johnny Cecotto	BMW Motorsport Team Schnitzer
7	R2	(Germany) Zweibrücken	16 August		(Venezuela) Johnny Cecotto	BMW Motorsport Team Schnitzer
8	R1	(Austria) Salzburgring	30 August	(Denmark) Tom Kristensen	(France) Laurent Aïello	Peugeot Esso
8	R2	(Austria) Salzburgring	30 August		(France) Laurent Aïello	Peugeot Esso
9	R1	(Germany) Oschersleben	13 September	(France) Laurent Aïello	(France) Laurent Aïello	Peugeot Esso
9	R2	(Germany) Oschersleben	13 September		(France) Laurent Aïello	Peugeot Esso
10	R1	(Germany) Nürburgring	4 October	(Germany) Manuel Reuter	(Germany) Manuel Reuter	Opel Team SMS
10	R2	(Germany) Nürburgring	4 October		(France) Éric Hélary	TNT Team SMS

== Championship results ==
Points system
Race 1	1st	2nd	3rd	4th	5th	6th	7th	8th	9th	10th	11th	12th	13th	14th	15th	16th	17th	18th	19th	20th
	30	24	20	17	16	15	14	13	12	11	10	9	8	7	6	5	4	3	2	1
Race 2	1st	2nd	3rd	4th	5th	6th	7th	8th	9th	10th	11th	12th	13th	14th	15th	16th	17th	18th	19th	20th
	60	48	40	34	32	30	28	26	24	22	20	18	16	14	12	10	8	6	4	2

Pos	Driver	HOC (Germany)		NÜR (Germany)		SAC (Germany)		NOR (Germany)		LAH (Germany)		WUN (Germany)		ZWE (Germany)		SAL (Austria)		OSC (Germany)		NÜR (Germany)		Pts
1	(Venezuela) Johnny Cecotto	8	8	3	1	1	1	8	4	4	2	9	10	1	1	12	10	3	2	4	4	595
2	(France) Laurent Aïello	4	2	4	3	3	5	6	1	12	10	1	Ret	3	5	1	1	1	1	3	6	592
3	(Germany) Uwe Alzen	1	17	6	5	4	Ret	2	3	1	4	5	2	15	6	2	13	5	5	5	2	482
4	(France) Éric Hélary	Ret	9	2	2	19	7	7	2	2	3	7	4	8	4	Ret	DNS	9	6	2	1	473
5	(Germany) Manuel Reuter	2	1	5	11	16	6	Ret	10	20	6	2	1	5	20	3	15	8	Ret	1	3	423
6	(Germany) Joachim Winkelhock	3	3	7	7	9	2	10	5	Ret	Ret	10	11	2	2	13	16	4	3	Ret	10	405
7	(Italy) Gabriele Tarquini	7	11	8	Ret	5	4	5	7	3	1	Ret	DNS	4	22	5	4	16	12	21	9	335
8	(Germany) Roland Asch	15	10	1	4	Ret	3	3	6	6	7	Ret	DNS	6	3	22	11	10	13	Ret	21	327
9	(Germany) Michael Krumm	11	4	12	21	6	Ret	Ret	12	7	Ret	6	6	7	12	9	6	2	4	12	8	312
10	(Germany) Jörg van Ommen	Ret	DNS	9	6	11	9	1	DNS	Ret	11	4	3	Ret	7	6	5	14	11	11	13	311
11	(Denmark) Tom Kristensen	9	12	Ret	DNS	7	Ret	14	8	8	16	3	5	Ret	9	8	7	13	10	7	5	293
12	(Germany) Christian Abt	6	5	11	8	8	8	4	9	9	Ret	15	8	Ret	14	4	Ret	6	Ret	13	18	267
13	(Germany) Christian Menzel	5	Ret	10	9	2	DSQ	15	18	11	9	11	12	12	13	15	12	12	7	14	15	254
14	(Germany) Frank Biela	13	Ret	14	12	Ret	11	20	Ret	10	5	8	Ret	13	11	14	9	11	8	6	11	242
15	(Germany) Alexander Burgstaller	10	16	13	14	Ret	Ret	17	Ret	5	15	16	7	9	15	11	8	17	14	8	7	227
16	(Italy) Emanuele Pirro	16	7	Ret	13	17	Ret	19	19	13	8	Ret	Ret	14	Ret	7	2	7	Ret	10	12	205
17	(Germany) Klaus Niedzwiedz	17	14	16	15	18	15	11	Ret	15	12	13	13	16	16	18	14	21	16	15	Ret	156
18	(Italy) Stefano Modena	18	18	15	12	10	17	Ret	DNS	14	Ret	Ret	9	10	10	16	Ret	18	15	22	17	146
19	(Germany) Michael Bartels													11	8	10	3	15	9	9	14	143
20	(Germany) Peter Mamerow	Ret	DNS	17	14	16	10	9	13	16	17	14	14	19	17	20	Ret	20	17	16	Ret	130
21	(Germany) Franz Engstler	14	19	18	18	10	14	16	15	17	14	12	15	20	Ret	21	DNS	24	19	18	16	119
22	(Germany) Marco Bromberger	19	15	19	17	15	13	21	17	19	13			18	18	19	17	22	20	20	19	98
23	(Germany) Leopold Prinz von Bayern	20	6	20	20	20	16	Ret	16	18	Ret	Ret	16	17	21	17	Ret	19	18	17	Ret	98
24	(Germany) Oliver Mayer	12	13	21	19	13	12	18	Ret			17	17	19	21			23	21	19	20	78
25	(Italy) Fabrizio Giovanardi							13	11													28
26	(Italy) Nicola Larini							12	14													23
Pos	Driver	HOC (Germany)		NÜR (Germany)		SAC (Germany)		NOR (Germany)		REG (Germany)		WUN (Germany)		ZWE (Germany)		SAL (Austria)		OSC (Germany)		NÜR (Germany)		Pts

Colour	Result
Gold	Winner
Silver	Second place
Bronze	Third place
Green	Points classification
Blue	Non-points classification
Blue	Non-classified finish (NC)
Purple	Retired, not classified (Ret)
Red	Did not qualify (DNQ)
Red	Did not pre-qualify (DNPQ)
Black	Disqualified (DSQ)
White	Did not start (DNS)
White	Withdrew (WD)
White	Race cancelled (C)
Blank	Did not practice (DNP)
Blank	Did not arrive (DNA)
Blank	Excluded (EX)

=== Manufacturers' Trophy ===
Pos	Manufacturer	Points
1	(Germany) Opel	673
2	(France) Peugeot	647
3	(Japan) Nissan	491
4	(Japan) Honda	440
5	(Germany) Audi	415

=== Teams Trophy ===
Pos	Team	Points
1	BMW Team Schnitzer	616
2	Team Isert	298
3	Auto Plus Bemani Team	156
4	Euroteam	146
5	Mamerow Racing Team	130
6	Irmscher Motorsport	119
7	Auto Diesnst Bemani Team	98
8	Oliver Mayer Motorsport	78
9	Alfa Corse	29
