= 1997 Super Tourenwagen Cup =

1997 ADAC Super Tourenwagen Cup was the fourth season of the German touring car series

Seasons
- ← 1996 1998 →

The 1997 ADAC Deutsche Super Touren Wagen-Cup was the fourth edition of the Super Tourenwagen Cup (STW).

== Season summary ==
The 1997 season saw a battle for the championship between Laurent Aïello for Peugeot and Joachim Winkelhock for BMW. Aiello took an early lead which he held throughout the season, scoring an impressive 11 wins and 17 podiums in 20 races. Winkelhock meanwhile emerged as the prime challenger after an even start between him and teammate Johnny Cecotto, but despite a mid-season four-race winning streak he could not catch Aiello, who claimed the title for Peugeot. Reigning champions Audi meanwhile struggled, despite a star lineup including Emanuele Pirro, Yvan Muller and Tamara Vidali, with Pirro winning only a single race and the other two drivers failing to reach the podium.

== Teams and drivers ==
Team	Car	No	Drivers	Rounds	Class
(France) ROC Auto/A.Z.K.	Audi A4 Quattro	1	(Italy) Emanuele Pirro	1-7	M
(France) ROC Auto/A.Z.K.	Audi A4	1	(Italy) Emanuele Pirro	8-10	M
(France) ROC Auto/A.Z.K.	Audi A4 Quattro	2	(Austria) Philipp Peter	All	M
(France) ROC Auto/A.Z.K.	Audi A4	3	(France) Yvan Muller	All	T
(France) ROC Auto/A.Z.K.	Audi A4 Quattro	4	(Italy) Tamara Vidali	All	T
(Italy) BMW Team Bigazzi	BMW 320i	5	(Venezuela) Johnny Cecotto	All	M
(Italy) BMW Team Bigazzi	BMW 320i	6	(Germany) Joachim Winkelhock	All	M
(France) Peugeot Esso	Peugeot 406	9	(Germany) Jörg van Ommen	All	M
(France) Peugeot Esso	Peugeot 406	10	(France) Laurent Aïello	All	M
(Germany) Team Honda Sport	Honda Accord	11	(Germany) Altfrid Heger	All	M
(Germany) Team Honda Sport	Honda Accord	12	(Germany) Marco Werner	All	M
(Germany) Cool Fire Alfa Romeo Team Engstler (Note: Cars 14, 15, 38, and 47. were entered as Cool Fire Alfa Romeo Team Engstler while cars 16. and 17. were entered as Beru Zündtechnik AR Engstler)	Alfa Romeo 155 TS	14	(Germany) Frank Schmickler	1-7	T
(Germany) Cool Fire Alfa Romeo Team Engstler	Alfa Romeo 155 TS	15	(Germany) Franz Engstler	All	T
(Germany) Beru Zündtechnik AR Engstler	Alfa Romeo 155 TS	16	(Germany) Marco Bromberger	All	T
(Germany) Beru Zündtechnik AR Engstler	Alfa Romeo 155 TS	17	(Germany) Danny Pfeil	All	T
(Germany) Abt Sportsline	Audi A4 Quattro	18	(Germany) Christian Abt	All	T
(Germany) Abt Sportsline	Audi A4 Quattro	19	(Denmark) Kris Nissen	All	T
(Germany) Opel Team Zakspeed	Opel Vectra	20	(Denmark) Kurt Thiim	1-2, 4-10	T
(Germany) Opel Team Zakspeed	Opel Vectra	21	(Germany) Uwe Alzen	All	M
(Germany) Nissan Primera Racing	Nissan Primera eGT	22	(Germany) Sascha Maassen	All	M
(Germany) Nissan Primera Racing	Nissan Primera eGT	23	(Germany) Roland Asch	All	M
(Germany) Isert BMW-Team	BMW 320i	24	(United Kingdom) Steve Soper	10	T
(Germany) Isert BMW-Team	BMW 320i	25	(Germany) Leopold Prinz von Bayern	1, 3-9	T
(Germany) Isert BMW-Team	BMW 320i	26	(Germany) Christian Menzel	All	T
(Germany) Opel Team SMS	Opel Vectra	27	(Germany) Manuel Reuter	All	M
(Germany) Opel Team SMS	Opel Vectra	28	(Germany) Michael Bartels	All	T
(Germany) Opel Team AM Holzer	Opel Vectra	30	(Germany) Alexander Burgstaller	1-5	T
(Germany) Opel Team AM Holzer	Opel Vectra	31	(Germany) Ronny Melkus	1-2, 4	T
(Germany) Team Honda Sport	Honda Accord	32	(United Kingdom) James Thompson	10	M
(Germany) PMC Sports	BMW 320i	33	(Germany) Marc Gindorf	1-5	T
(Italy) JAS Engineering	Alfa Romeo 155 TS	35	(Germany) Christian Danner	All	M
(Italy) JAS Engineering	Alfa Romeo 155 TS	36	(Italy) Stefano Modena	All	M
(Germany) Cool Fire Alfa Romeo Team Engstler	Alfa Romeo 155 TS	38	(Germany) Stephen Vollmair	10	T
(Germany) MHT Sports	BMW 318is	39	(Germany) Michael Heigert	1-3	T
(Germany) Isert BMW-Team	BMW 320i	40	(France) Éric Hélary	2	T
AUGROS-MIG Austria Team	Audi A4	44	(Germany) Klaus Niedzwiedz	All	T
AUGROS-MIG Austria Team	Audi A4	45	(Germany) Dirk Müller	4-6, 8-10	T
AUGROS-MIG Austria Team	Audi A4	46	(Austria) Raimund Baumschlager	7	T
(Germany) Cool Fire Alfa Romeo Team Engstler	Alfa Romeo 155 TS	47	(Italy) Gianni Giudici	8	T

Icon	Class
M	Drivers eligible to score points in the Manufactures Trophy
T	Drivers eligible to score points in the Team Trophy

== Race calendar and results ==
Round		Circuit	Date	Pole position	Fastest lap	Winning driver	Winning team
1	R1	(Germany) Hockenheimring	27 April	(France) Laurent Aiello	(France) Laurent Aiello	(France) Laurent Aiello	Peugeot Esso
1	R2	(Germany) Hockenheimring	27 April		(France) Laurent Aiello	(France) Laurent Aiello	Peugeot Esso
2	R1	(Belgium) Zolder	11 May	(Venezuela) Johnny Cecotto	(Germany) Joachim Winkelhock	(Venezuela) Johnny Cecotto	BMW Team Bigazzi
2	R2	(Belgium) Zolder	11 May		(France) Laurent Aiello	(Venezuela) Johnny Cecotto	BMW Team Bigazzi
3	R1	(Germany) Nürburgring	25 May	(France) Laurent Aiello	(France) Laurent Aiello	(France) Laurent Aiello	Peugeot Esso
3	R2	(Germany) Nürburgring	25 May		(France) Laurent Aiello	(France) Laurent Aiello	Peugeot Esso
4	R1	(Germany) Sachsenring	15 June	(France) Laurent Aiello	(Germany) Joachim Winkelhock	(Germany) Joachim Winkelhock	BMW Team Bigazzi
4	R2	(Germany) Sachsenring	15 June		(France) Laurent Aiello	(Germany) Joachim Winkelhock	BMW Team Bigazzi
5	R1	(Germany) Norisring	29 June	(France) Laurent Aiello	(France) Laurent Aiello	(Germany) Joachim Winkelhock	BMW Team Bigazzi
5	R2	(Germany) Norisring	29 June		(Germany) Jörg van Ommen	(Germany) Joachim Winkelhock	BMW Team Bigazzi
6	R1	(Germany) Wunstorf	13 July	(France) Laurent Aiello	(France) Laurent Aiello	(France) Laurent Aiello	Peugeot Esso
6	R2	(Germany) Wunstorf	13 July		(France) Laurent Aiello	(France) Laurent Aiello	Peugeot Esso
7	R1	(Germany) Zweibrücken	10 August	(France) Laurent Aiello	(France) Laurent Aiello	(France) Laurent Aiello	Peugeot Esso
7	R2	(Germany) Zweibrücken	10 August		(Germany) Joachim Winkelhock	(Italy) Emanuele Pirro	ROC Auto/A.Z.K.
8	R1	(Austria) Salzburgring	24 August	(France) Laurent Aiello	(France) Laurent Aiello	(France) Laurent Aiello	Peugeot Esso
8	R2	(Austria) Salzburgring	24 August		(France) Laurent Aiello	(France) Laurent Aiello	Peugeot Esso
9	R1	(Germany) Lahr	7 September	(Venezuela) Johnny Cecotto	(Germany) Uwe Alzen	(Venezuela) Johnny Cecotto	BMW Team Bigazzi
9	R2	(Germany) Lahr	7 September		(Germany) Christian Menzel	(Germany) Joachim Winkelhock	BMW Team Bigazzi
10	R1	(Germany) Nürburgring	5 October	(France) Laurent Aiello	(France) Laurent Aiello	(France) Laurent Aiello	Peugeot Esso
10	R2	(Germany) Nürburgring	5 October		(France) Laurent Aiello	(France) Laurent Aiello	Peugeot Esso

== Championship results ==
Points system
Race 1	1st	2nd	3rd	4th	5th	6th	7th	8th	9th	10th	11th	12th	13th	14th	15th	16th	17th	18th	19th	20th
	30	24	20	17	16	15	14	13	12	11	10	9	8	7	6	5	4	3	2	1
Race 2	1st	2nd	3rd	4th	5th	6th	7th	8th	9th	10th	11th	12th	13th	14th	15th	16th	17th	18th	19th	20th
	60	48	40	34	32	30	28	26	24	22	20	18	16	14	12	10	8	6	4	2

Pos	Driver	HOC (Germany)		ZOL (Belgium)		NÜR (Germany)		SAC (Germany)		NOR (Germany)		WUN (Germany)		ZWE (Germany)		SAL (Austria)		LAH (Germany)		NÜR (Germany)		Pts
1	(France) Laurent Aïello	1	1	3	3	1	1	2	2	2	Ret	1	1	1	4	1	1	2	20	1	1	696
2	(Germany) Joachim Winkelhock	4	2	2	2	Ret	Ret	1	1	1	1	2	3	2	5	4	2	7	1	3	2	644
3	(Venezuela) Johnny Cecotto	2	3	1	1	3	2	15	5	4	Ret	7	5	3	2	7	5	1	2	5	3	571
4	(Germany) Jörg van Ommen	3	4	9	19	4	5	5	4	3	2	6	10	17	Ret	2	24	6	21	2	4	377
5	(Germany) Uwe Alzen	9	26	15	15	6	7	3	3	25	12	3	2	7	25	3	3	3	3	6	Ret	370
6	(Italy) Emanuele Pirro	11	9	4	10	7	5	4	Ret	5	3	Ret	Ret	4	1	13	7	19	11	13	10	357
7	(France) Yvan Muller	12	11	10	11	20	Ret	13	6	11	19	Ret	Ret	6	6	6	6	4	4	7	6	298
8	(Germany) Roland Asch	13	10	21	18	9	9	10	9	12	6	11	12	13	11	14	11	Ret	12	11	9	285
9	(Denmark) Kris Nissen	5	6	16	6	14	13	8	19	16	4	24	14	14	14	15	10	11	8	26	16	273
10	(Germany) Sascha Maassen	14	Ret	8	7	10	8	7	11	9	20	Ret	8	15	12	18	12	13	9	18	11	263
11	(Germany) Michael Bartels	18	13	17	26	8	10	Ret	DNS	15	17	13	9	16	16	5	4	10	6	4	5	263
12	(Germany) Altfrid Heger	28	Ret	28	12	5	4	16	14	10	Ret	10	13	11	15	12	Ret	12	7	10	8	238
13	(Germany) Christian Abt	8	15	5	4	11	12	11	17	6	Ret	15	11	8	17	17	14	Ret	Ret	19	13	223
14	(Germany) Christian Menzel	7	8	11	16	Ret	Ret	9	7	Ret	DNS	8	7	25	9	8	8	5	Ret	Ret	DNS	222
15	(Italy) Tamara Vidali	23	Ret	13	Ret	13	11	Ret	8	7	5	20	15	10	7	27	19	14	13	17	14	207
16	(Austria) Philipp Peter	16	14	6	5	21	Ret	6	21	Ret	8	17	19	5	3	16	15	Ret	Ret	12	17	205
17	(Germany) Manuel Reuter	15	12	12	8	16	DNS	14	Ret	Ret	DNS	9	6	9	10	11	9	Ret	DNS	15	Ret	189
18	(Denmark) Kurt Thiim	Ret	19	24	13			20	20	20	11	4	4	Ret	DNS	9	13	8	5	9	Ret	180
19	(Germany) Marco Werner	6	5	30	25	2	3	Ret	DNS	8	10	5	17	Ret	Ret	10	16	9	Ret	14	Ret	170
20	(Italy) Stefano Modena	10	7	14	27	23	20	23	Ret	27	7	14	Ret	18	20	19	17	16	10	DNS	Ret	129
21	(Germany) Klaus Niedzwiedz	24	20	20	20	18	DNS	Ret	12	14	9	12	Ret	12	8	22	20	Ret	14	21	15	103
22	(Germany) Leopold Prinz von Bayern	29	17			15	14	17	10	26	DNS	16	21	26	18	26	23	17	15			85
23	(Germany) Alexander Burgstaller	25	18	18	14	12	15	12	13	13	Ret											79
24	(Germany) Franz Engstler	21	Ret	22	17	22	21	21	15	23	15	19	18	20	23	21	22	18	17	20	20	57
25	(Germany) Frank Schmickler	22	24	29	Ret	26	16	22	16	24	14	21	16	21	19							52
26	(Germany) Marc Gindorf	20	16	Ret	Ret	19	17	18	Ret	19	13											44
27	(United Kingdom) James Thompson																			8	7	41
28	(France) Éric Hélary			7	9																	38
29	(Germany) Christian Danner	17	23	23	23	17	Ret	Ret	Ret	17	Ret	18	Ret	24	21	20	18	20	18	23	18	37
30	(United Kingdom) Steve Soper																			16	12	23
31	(Germany) Danny Pfeil	26	21	26	22	24	19	25	22	21	16	23	20	23	22	25	Ret	Ret	DNS	24	19	23
32	(Germany) Dirk Müller							19	Ret	18	21	Ret	DNS			23	21	15	16	22	Ret	21
33	(Austria) Raimund Baumschlager													19	13							20
34	(Germany) Marco Bromberger	27	22	25	24	25	Ret	26	18	22	18	22	Ret	22	24	24	25	21	19	Ret	DNS	16
34	(Germany) Michael Heigert	Ret	25	27	Ret	27	18															8
35	(Germany) Ronny Melkus	19	Ret	19	21			24	DNS													4
36	(Germany) Stephan Vollmair																			25	DNS	0
37	(Italy) Gianni Giudici															Ret	DNS					0
Pos	Driver	HOC (Germany)		ZOL (Belgium)		NÜR (Germany)		SAC (Germany)		NOR (Germany)		WUN (Germany)		ZWE (Germany)		SAL (Austria)		REG (Germany)		NÜR (Germany)		Pts

Colour	Result
Gold	Winner
Silver	Second place
Bronze	Third place
Green	Points classification
Blue	Non-points classification
Blue	Non-classified finish (NC)
Purple	Retired, not classified (Ret)
Red	Did not qualify (DNQ)
Red	Did not pre-qualify (DNPQ)
Black	Disqualified (DSQ)
White	Did not start (DNS)
White	Withdrew (WD)
White	Race cancelled (C)
Blank	Did not practice (DNP)
Blank	Did not arrive (DNA)
Blank	Excluded (EX)

=== Manufacturers' Trophy ===
Pos	Manufacturer	Points
1	(Germany) BMW	1215
2	(France) Peugeot	1073
3	(Germany) Audi	562
4	(Germany) Opel	559
5	(Japan) Nissan	548
6	(Japan) Honda	442
7	(Italy) Alfa Romeo	166

=== Teams' Trophy ===
Pos	Team	Points
1	(France) ROC Auto/A.Z.K.	505
2	(Germany) Abt Sportsline	496
3	(Germany) Opel Team SMS	423
4	(Germany) Isert BMW-Team	368
5	AUGROS-MIG Austria Team	144
6	(Germany) Cool Fire Alfa Romeo Team Engstler	109
7	(Germany) Opel Team AM Holzer	83
8	(Germany) PMC Sports	44
9	(Germany) Beru Zündtechnik AR Engstler	38
10	(Germany) Opel Team Zakspeed	20
