= Super Tourenwagen Cup =

Touring car racing series in Germany

- Category: Super Touring
- Country: Germany
- Inaugural season: 1994
- Folded: 1999
- Last Drivers' champion: (Germany) Christian Abt
- Last Makes' champion: (Germany) Audi
- Last Teams' champion: (Germany) Abt Sportsline

The Super Tourenwagen Cup, or German Supertouring Championship, was a touring car racing series held between 1994 and 1999 in Germany.

The championship was established when BMW and Audi both left the Deutsche Tourenwagen Meisterschaft (DTM) in 1992, after the series had adopted the more expensive Class 1 Touring Cars rules. STW would run to Super Touring regulations for the full six years of its existence. The demise of the championship turned out to be the revival of the Deutsche Tourenwagen Masters (also abbreviated to DTM) in 2000, as the factory teams pulled out of the STW for the new series. The STW was succeeded by its second level series, the Deutsche Tourenwagen Challenge, and later the ADAC Procar Series.

== Full list of champions ==
Year	Champion	Car	Team
1994	(Venezuela) Johnny Cecotto	BMW 318is	BMW Motorsport
1995	(Germany) Joachim Winkelhock	BMW 320i	Schnitzer Motorsport
1996	(Italy) Emanuele Pirro	Audi A4 Quattro	A.Z.K/R.O.C.
1997	(France) Laurent Aïello	Peugeot 406	Peugeot Esso
1998	(Venezuela) Johnny Cecotto	BMW 320i	BMW Motorsport Team Schnitzer
1999	(Germany) Christian Abt	Audi A4 Quattro	Abt Sportsline

== Race winners ==
	Driver	Total
1	(France) Laurent Aïello	20
2	(Venezuela) Johnny Cecotto	12
2	(Italy) Emanuele Pirro	12
3	(Germany) Joachim Winkelhock	11
4	(Germany) Uwe Alzen	8
4	(Germany) Frank Biela	8
5	(Germany) Christian Abt	5
5	(Germany) Manuel Reuter	5
6	(Denmark) Tom Kristensen	3
6	(United Kingdom) Steve Soper	3
7	(Germany) Roland Asch	2
7	(Germany) Armin Hahne	2
7	(France) Éric Hélary	2
7	(Italy) Gabriele Tarquini	2
8	(Germany) Alexander Burgstaller	1
8	(Italy) Fabrizio Giovanardi	1
8	(Germany) Altfrid Heger	1
8	(United Kingdom) Keith O'Dor	1
8	(Germany) Jörg van Ommen	1
8	(Austria) Philipp Peter	1
8	(Denmark) Kris Nissen	1

	Manufactures	Total
1	(Germany) BMW	28
2	(Germany) Audi	27
3	(France) Peugeot	21
4	(Germany) Opel	15
5	(Japan) Honda	7
6	(Japan) Nissan	2
7	(Italy) Alfa Romeo	1
7	(United States) Ford	1

== Driver Statistics ==
	Driver	Pole Position	Victory	2nd Place	3rd Place	Total Podium	Total Race
1	(France) Laurent Aïello	11	20	9	6	35	58
2	(Venezuela) Johnny Cecotto	6	12	7	8	27	54
3	(Italy) Emanuele Pirro	5	12	7	6	25	70
4	(Germany) Joachim Winkelhock	1	11	12	5	28	58
5	(Germany) Uwe Alzen	5	8	9	11	28	60
6	(Germany) Frank Biela	2	8	2	4	14	44
7	(Germany) Christian Abt	1	5	4	6	15	78
8	(Germany) Manuel Reuter	4	5	3	5	13	60
9	(Denmark) Tom Kristensen	2	3	4	3	10	40
10	(United Kingdom) Steve Soper	3	3	3	5	11	26
11	(France) Éric Hélary	3	2	7	2	11	42
12	(Italy) Gabriele Tarquini	0	2	2	5	9	40
13	(Germany) Armin Hahne	1	2	1	3	6	34
13	(Germany) Roland Asch	1	2	1	3	6	34
14	(Germany) Altfrid Heger	3	1	4	1	6	62
15	(Germany) Jörg van Ommen	0	1	3	3	7	40
15	(Denmark) Kris Nissen	0	1	3	3	7	66
16	(Austria) Philipp Peter	2	1	2	1	4	38
17	(Germany) Alexander Burgstaller	0	1	1	2	4	72
18	(Italy) Fabrizio Giovanardi	1	1	0	0	1	4
18	(United Kingdom) Keith O'Dor	1	1	0	0	1	14
19	(Netherlands) Peter Kox	1	0	5	2	7	16
20	(Germany) Hans-Joachim Stuck	0	0	4	1	5	24
21	(Germany) Michael Bartels	0	0	2	1	3	48
22	(Italy) Roberto Ravaglia	1	0	1	3	4	19
23	(Italy) Tamara Vidali	0	0	1	2	3	54
23	(Austria) Karl Wendlinger	0	0	1	2	3	18
23	(Germany) Marco Werner	0	0	1	2	3	48
24	(Germany) Klaus Niedzwiedz	0	0	1	1	2	74
25	(Germany) Michael Krumm	0	0	1	0	1	20
25	(Germany) Christian Menzel	0	0	1	0	1	40
26	(United Kingdom) Anthony Reid	0	0	0	2	2	16
27	(Italy) Rinaldo Capello	0	0	0	1	1	12
27	(Italy) Nicola Larini	0	0	0	1	1	4
27	(Germany) Jörg Müller	0	0	0	1	1	22
27	(Germany) Markus Oestreich	0	0	0	1	1	8
28	(Germany) Patrick Bernhardt	1	0	0	0	0	8

== Manufactures Statistics ==
	Manufacture	Pole Position	Victory	2nd Place	3rd Place	Total Podium
1	(Germany) BMW	13	28	32	26	86
2	(Germany) Audi	13	27	27	27	81
3	(France) Peugeot	11	21	12	10	43
4	(Germany) Opel	12	15	19	19	53
5	(Japan) Honda	3	7	9	13	29
6	(Japan) Nissan	2	2	2	5	9
7	(United States) Ford	0	1	1	1	3
8	(Italy) Alfa Romeo	1	1	0	1	2
