= Regio-Ring =

Airfield circuit, Lahr, Germany

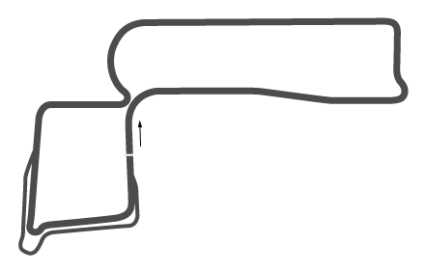
- Full Circuit (1996–1997)
- Location: Lahr, Baden-Württemberg, Germany
- Coordinates: 48°21′42″N 7°49′20″E
- Capacity: 32,000
- Operator: ADAC Südbaden (1996–1999)
- Opened: 1996
- Closed: 1999
- Major events: Super Tourenwagen Cup (1997–1998); German Formula Three Championship (1997–1998); Porsche Carrera Cup Germany (1998)

Full Circuit (1998)
- Surface: Asphalt/Concrete
- Length: 3.240 km (2.013 mi)
- Turns: 10
- Race lap record: 1:08.901 ( (Germany) Pierre Kaffer, Martini MK73, 1998, F3)

Full Circuit (1996–1997)
- Surface: Asphalt/Concrete
- Length: 3.352 km (2.083 mi)
- Turns: 10
- Race lap record: 1:13.113 ( (Germany) Norman Simon, Dallara F397, 1997, F3)

Regio-Ring was a motorsports racetack located on the Lahr Airport in Lahr, Baden-Württemberg, Germany. Created by ADAC Südbaden, the circuit's original length was 3.352 km (2.083 mi), and was shortened to 3.240 km (2.013 mi) in 1998.

The track was first used at the Divinol Tourenwagen Cup in August 1996. The Super Tourenwagen Cup and German Formula Three Championship raced at the venue in September 1997 and July 1998, with the Porsche Carrera Cup Germany also held in the latter.

The IDM Superbike Championship announced a race for 1999 but was later cancelled. The track was never used again, due to the expansion of the airport and the impossibility of operating three-day race events.

== Lap records ==
The fastest official race lap records at the Regio-Ring are listed as:

Category	Time	Driver	Vehicle	Event
Full Circuit (1998): 3.240 km (2.013 mi)
Formula Three	1:08.901	Pierre Kaffer	Martini MK73	1998 Lahr German F3 round
Super Touring	1:15.660	Johnny Cecotto (Note: Johnny Cecotto took the same lap time in both races of this round.)	BMW 320i	1998 Lahr STW round
Full Circuit (1996–1997): 3.352 km (2.083 mi)
Formula Three	1:13.113	Norman Simon	Dallara F397	1997 Lahr German F3 round
Super Touring	1:19.397	Christian Menzel	BMW 320i	1997 Lahr STW round
