= Peugeot 406 =

Mid-size car by Peugeot, 1995 to 2004

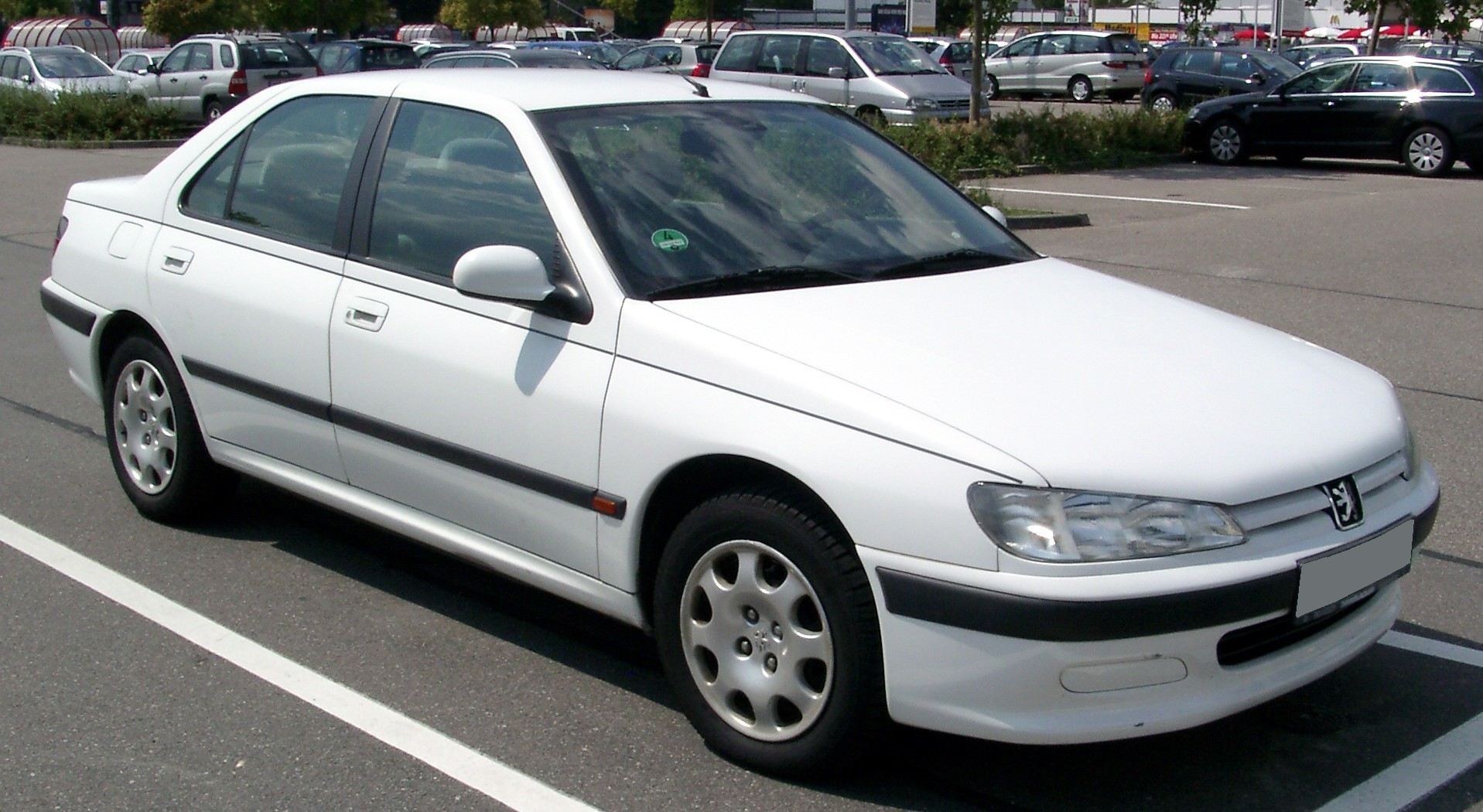

Overview
- Manufacturer: Peugeot
- Also called: Peugeot Coupé
- Production: 1995–2004 (France); 1996–2008 (Egypt); 1997–2005 (Coupé)
- Assembly: France: Sochaux (Sochaux Plant); Italy: Grugliasco & San Giorgio (Pininfarina: Coupé); Egypt: Cairo (AAV); Indonesia: Jakarta (Gaya Motor); Nigeria: Kaduna (PAN); Thailand: Lat Krabang (Yontrakit)
- Designer: Laurent Rossi (saloon) (1991); Davide Arcangeli and Lorenzo Ramaciotti at Pininfarina (coupé)

Body and chassis
- Class: Large family car (D)
- Body style: 4-door saloon 5-door estate 2-door coupé
- Layout: Front engine, front-wheel-drive
- Related: Citroën Xantia

Powertrain
- Engine: Petrol: 1.6 L XU5 8V I4; 1.8 L EW7 8V I4; 1.8 L EW7 16V I4; 2.0 L EW10 16V I4; 2.0 L EW10 HPi 16V I4; 2.0 L EW10 turbo 8V I4; 2.2 L EW12 16V I4; 3.0 L ES9 24V V6; Diesel: 1.9 L XUD9 TD 8V I4; 2.0 L DW10 HDi 8V I4; 2.1 L XUD11 12V TD I4; 2.2 L DW12 HDi 16V I4
- Transmission: 4-speed AL4 automatic 4-speed ZF 4HP20 automatic (V6 only); 5-speed manual

Dimensions
- Wheelbase: 2,700 mm (106.3 in)
- Length: 4,555 mm (179.3 in) (saloon); 4,736 mm (186.5 in) (estate); 4,615 mm (181.7 in) (coupé)
- Width: 1,764 mm (69.4 in) (saloon); 1,760 mm (69.3 in) (estate); 1,781 mm (70.1 in) (coupé)
- Height: 1,396 mm (55.0 in)

Chronology
- Predecessor: Peugeot 405; Peugeot 504 coupé (for coupé)
- Successor: Peugeot 407

The Peugeot 406 is a large family car that was produced by French automaker Peugeot between 1995 and 2004. Available in saloon, estate and coupé bodystyles with a choice of petrol or turbodiesel engines, the 406 replaced the Peugeot 405 in Peugeot's lineup, and was itself replaced by the Peugeot 407.

== Phase 1 ==
The styling of the 406 is heavily influenced by its predecessor, the 405, which began to be phased out from the 406's launch in September 1995, and eventually finished production in Europe in 1997, when the last estate models were discontinued. United Kingdom sales of the 406 began in February 1996.

The initial design of the Coupe was originally offered to Fiat by Pininfarina in about 1990, only for Fiat to reject the design and design its own coupe.

The 406 was notably successful in the United Kingdom, having broken into the country's key fleet sales market, with a high percentage of units becoming company cars and taxis.

In August 2002, a Peugeot 406 HDi set the world record for the longest distance driven on a single tank of fuel. The car travelled across Australia between Melbourne to Rockhampton, with a total distance of 2,348 km. Knock-down kit versions of the car were also built at the Yontrakit Industrial Factory in Lad Krabang, Bangkok, Thailand.

=== Equipment ===
Initial trim levels consisted of SR, ST and top of the line SV with various optional features. 406 had many advanced optional features such as electric seats with memory, rain sensor, variable electronic suspension control, speed sensitive power steering and rear windscreen wiper on the saloon.

There was also a factory body kit available.

=== Suspension ===
For the front suspension, it has an inverted MacPherson suspension. For the rear suspension, Peugeot developed an all new and model exclusive multilink called RS10. It consist of three transverse control arms and a longitudinal arm.

Special features of the RS10 was that it could produce more negative toe on the outer wheel for stability in corners and more negative camber for stability when the rear end rises in emergency braking.

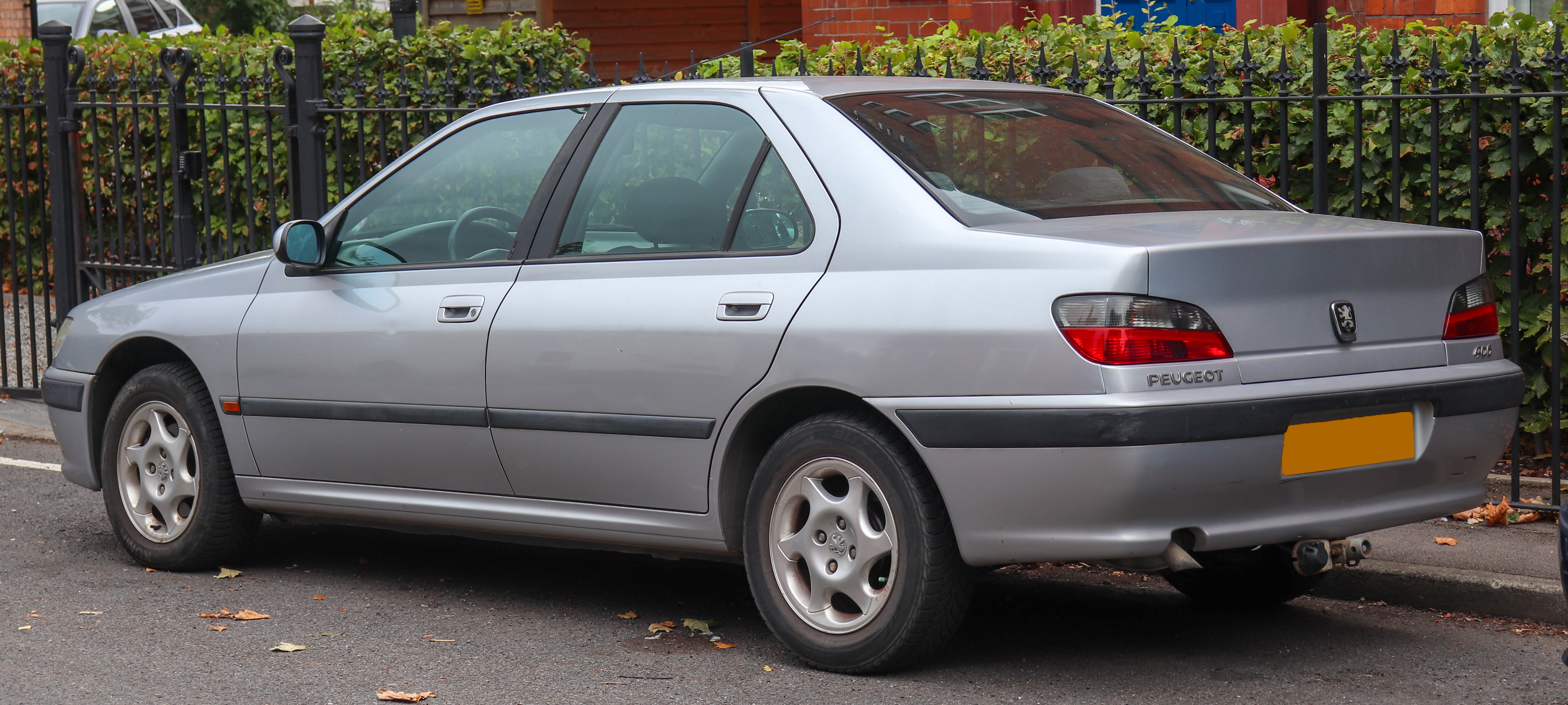
Peugeot 406 saloon (pre facelift)

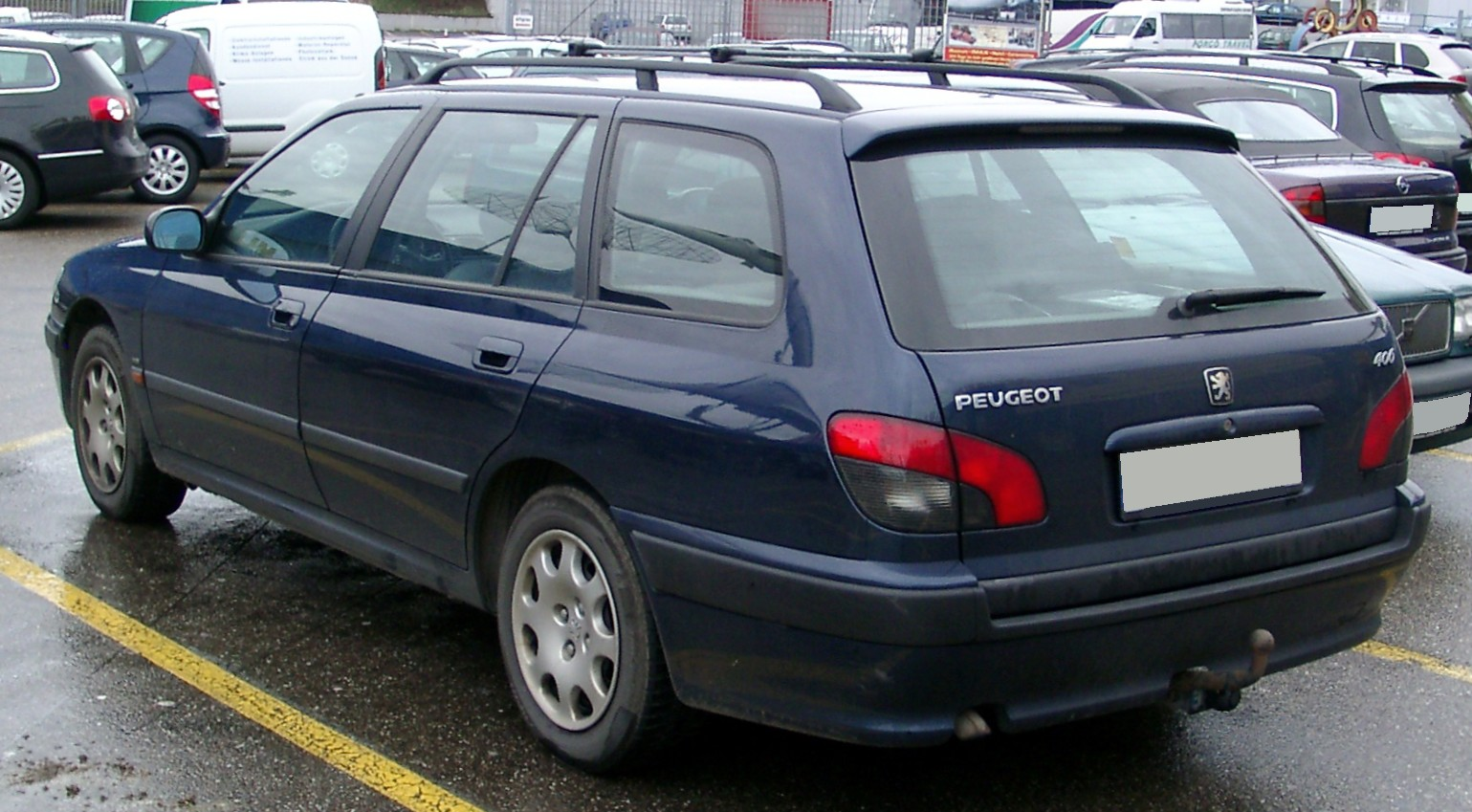
Peugeot 406 estate (pre facelift)

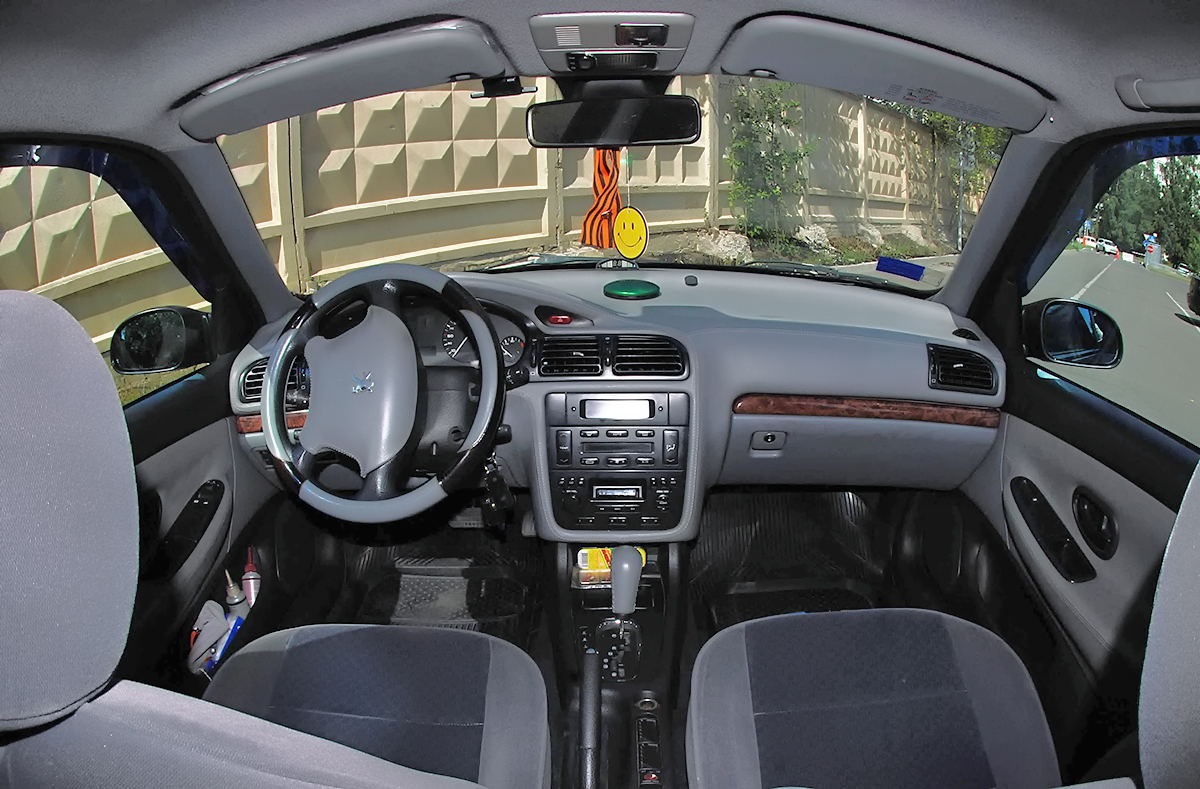
Interior (facelift)

== Coupé ==
The two door coupé, launched at the 1996 Paris Motor Show, was both designed and manufactured by Italian design studio Pininfarina, with choices of a 2.0 L four cylinder engine or a 3.0 L V6, and halfway through 2001, a 2.2 L HDi diesel engine. A total of 107,633 coupés were made.

The coupé has the same platform and suspension as saloon and estate but with some upgrades to enhance ride handling. All models had a wider track of 16mm from coupé specific rims and additional 36mm at the rear from different spindle and lower control arm. Ride height is lowered 16mm. V6 also received a 26 mm front strut brace and 305 mm Brembo 4-pot calipers front brakes.

The interior had the same dashboard, centre console and steering wheel as saloon and estate. It has a five gauge instrument panel with chrome rings on all models.

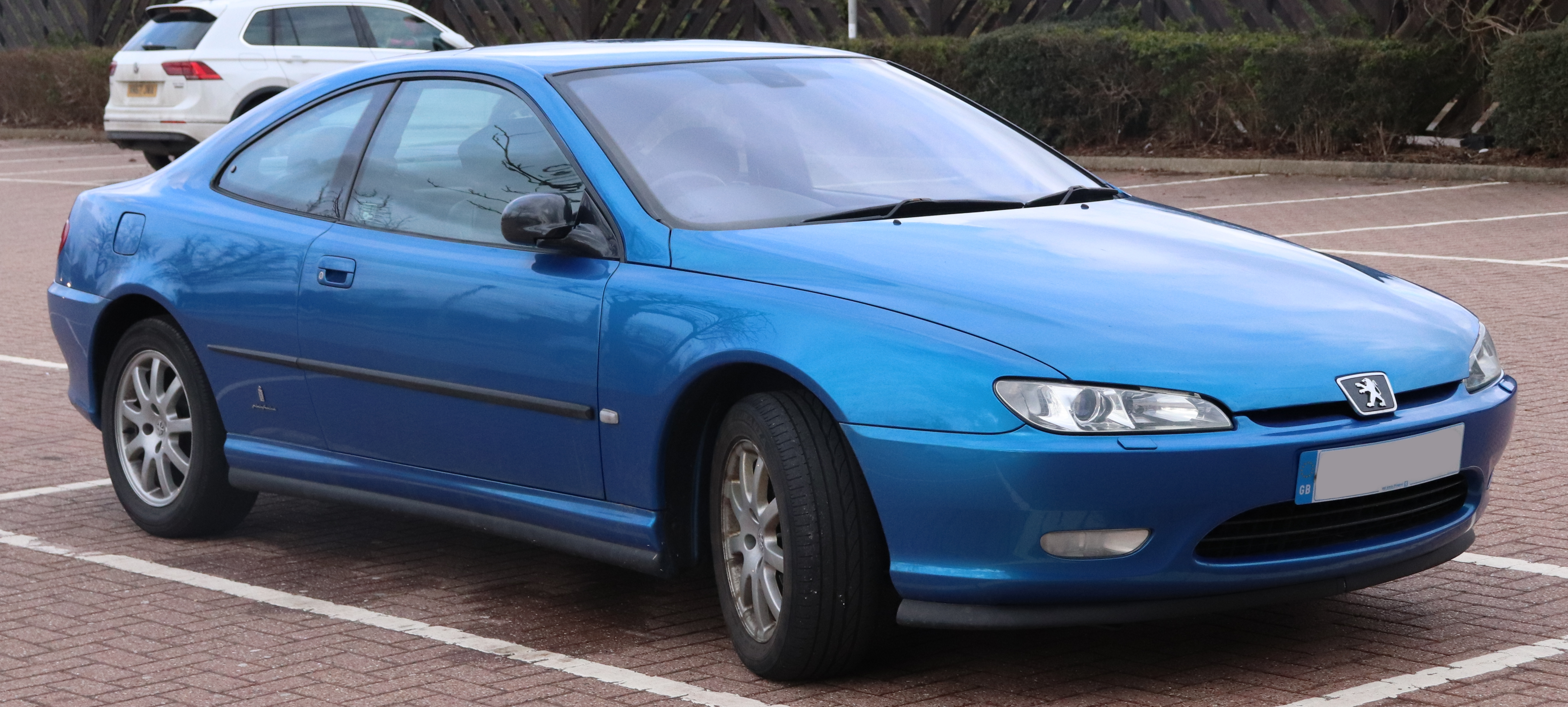
Front

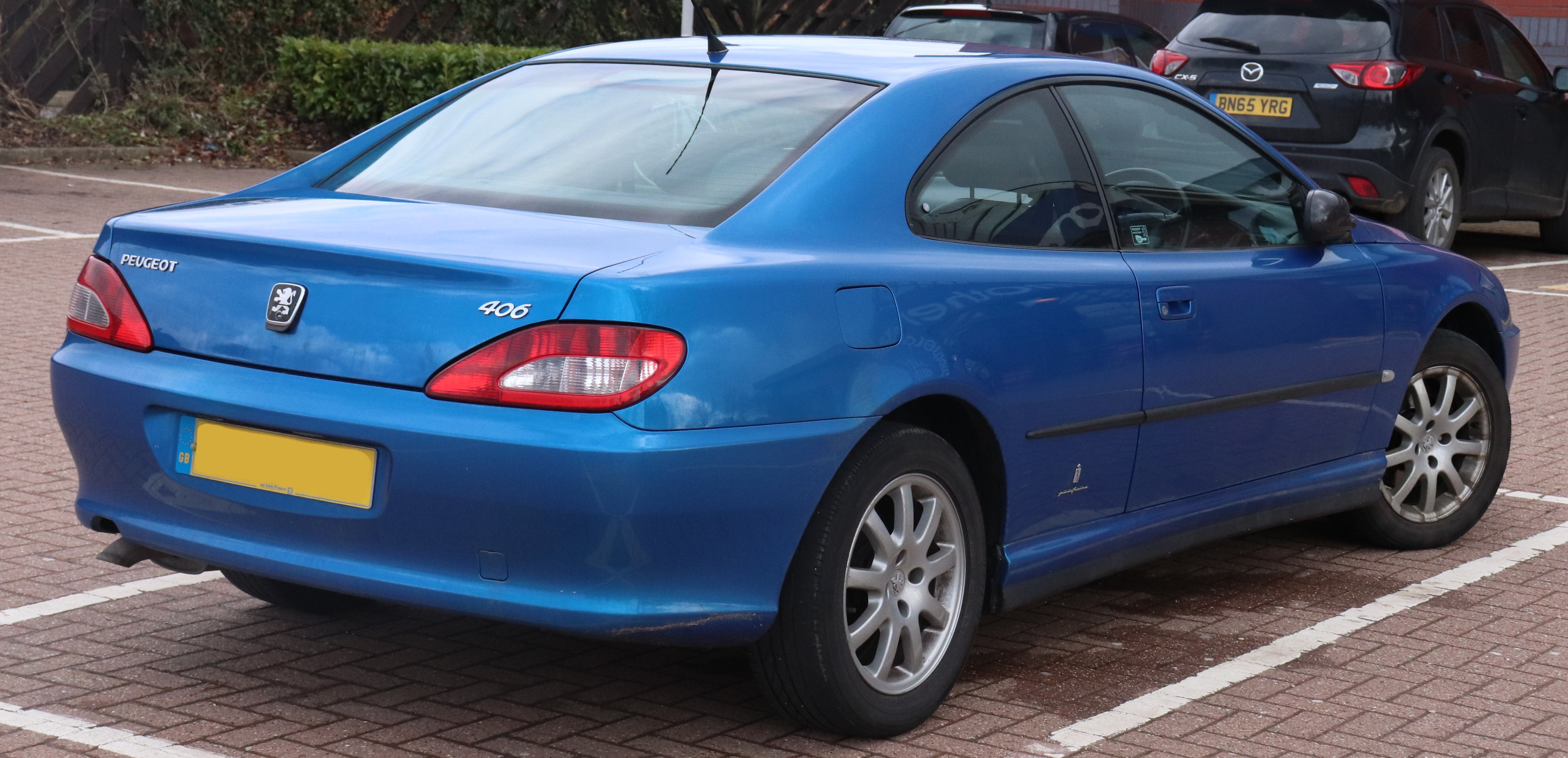
Rear

== Engines ==
The car was available with a range of petrol engines: 1.6 8V, 1.8 16V and 2.0 16V, 2.0 8V turbo and 3.0(2946cc) V6 24V

For diesel, there was three engines: 1.9 8V turbodiesel, 2.1 12V turbodiesel and 2.0HDi 8V

Model	Engine- type	Cylinders / valves	Displacement	Power / rpm	Torque / rpm	Years
Petrol
1.6	XU5 JP (BFZ)	4 / 8	1580 cc	88 PS (65 kW; 87 hp) / 6000	130 N⋅m (96 lb⋅ft) / 2600	1996–1997
1.8	XU7 JB	4 / 8	1761 cc	90 PS (66 kW; 89 hp) / 5000	147 N⋅m (108 lb⋅ft) / 2600	1997–1999
1.8	XU7 JP4	4 / 16	1761 cc	112 PS (82 kW; 110 hp) / 5500	155 N⋅m (114 lb⋅ft) / 4250	1996–2000
1.8	EW7 J4	4 / 16	1749 cc	117 PS (86 kW; 115 hp) / 5500	160 N⋅m (118 lb⋅ft) / 4000	1999–2004
2.0	XU10 J4R (RFV)	4 / 16	1998 cc	132 PS (97 kW; 130 hp) / 5500	180 N⋅m (133 lb⋅ft) / 4200	1996–2000
2.0	EW10 J4 (RFN)	4 / 16	1997 cc	136 PS (100 kW; 134 hp) / 6000	190 N⋅m (140 lb⋅ft) / 4100	1999–2003
2.0	EW10 J4 (RFR)	4 / 16	1997 cc	139 PS (102 kW; 137 hp) / 6000	197 N⋅m (145 lb⋅ft) / 4100	1999–2000
2.0 HPI	EW10 D (RLZ)	4 / 16	1997 cc	140 PS (103 kW; 138 hp) / 6000	192 N⋅m (142 lb⋅ft) / 4000	2001–2004
2.0 Turbo	XU10 J2TE	4 / 8	1998 cc	147 PS (108 kW; 145 hp) / 5300	235 N⋅m (173 lb⋅ft) / 2500	1997–1999
2.2	EW12 J4 (3FZ)	4 / 16	2231 cc	158 PS (116 kW; 156 hp) / 5650	217 N⋅m (160 lb⋅ft) / 3900	1999–2003
2.9 V6	ES9 J4 (XFZ)	6 / 24	2946 cc	190 PS (140 kW; 187 hp) / 5500	267 N⋅m (197 lb⋅ft) / 4000	1997–2000
2.9 V6	ES9 J4S (XFX)	6 / 24	2946 cc	207 PS (152 kW; 204 hp) / 6000	280 N⋅m (207 lb⋅ft) / 3750	1999–2003
Diesel
1.9 TD	XUD9 TE/Y	4 / 8	1905 cc	90 PS (66 kW; 89 hp) / 4000	196 N⋅m (145 lb⋅ft) / 2250	1995–1999
2.0 HDi	DW10 TD (RHY)	4 / 8	1997 cc	90 PS (66 kW; 89 hp) / 4000	205 N⋅m (151 lb⋅ft) / 1900	1999–2003
2.0 HDi	DW10 ATED (RHZ)	4 / 8	1997 cc	109 PS (80 kW; 108 hp) / 4000	250 N⋅m (184 lb⋅ft) / 1750	1999–2004
2.0 HDi	DW10 ATED (RHS)	4 / 8	1997cc	107 PS (79 kW; 106 hp)	250 N·m (184 lb·ft) / 1750	
2.1 TD	XUD11 BTE	4 / 12	2088 cc	109 PS (80 kW; 108 hp) / 4300	250 N⋅m (184 lb⋅ft) / 2000	1995–1999
2.2 HDi	DW12 TED4 (4HX)	4 / 16	2179 cc	133 PS (98 kW; 131 hp) / 4000	314 N⋅m (232 lb⋅ft) / 2000	2001–2003

== Phase 2 ==
Euro NCAP test results Peugeot 406 (1997)
Test	Score	Rating
Adult occupant:	15	2 /5 stars
Pedestrian:	N/A	2 /4 stars

Euro NCAP test results Peugeot 406 (2001)
Test	Score	Rating
Adult occupant:	18	3 /5 stars
Pedestrian:	14	2 /4 stars

The facelifted 406 saloon was introduced in February 1999 and safety, strength and speed enhancements resulted in improved Euro NCAP performance. Where the old 406 had one star and a struck off star, the post facelift models gained three stars.

New engine series was launched with the new and improved EW/DW Engine Family with greater power, torque and fuel efficiency along with increased refinement, making it comparatively quiet for a diesel. There was also a direct injected petrol dubbed HPi. The old 2.0 litre turbo petrol engine was succeeded by the N/A 2.2 petrol with VCT. Diesel engines received narrower radiator and the intercooler horizontally to the left beside the radiator.

The front and rear fascias received new bumpers and lights. As all models of the coupé the saloon and estate became equipped with 16-inch wheels in some of the trim levels.

The interior was also updated to improve comfort and sound insulation. Updated equipment included automated digital climate control/air conditioning on most models except the most basic and a multi function display for warning messages, trip computer, radio and external temperature. Rear view mirror with auto dim was also a new feature.

Halfway into 2001, there was an important update for the 406 with the implementation of the PSA and Renault developed VAN bus, can be recognised by the updated next generation steering column stalks that implemented the radio and cruise control stalk in one module. Also a new diesel engine appeared with this update; the 2.2HDi 16 valve with DPF.

The top of the range Executive model was fitted with a ten speaker JBL sound system, electrically adjusted and heated leather seats and a memory position for the electric seats and mirrors.

=== Gallery ===
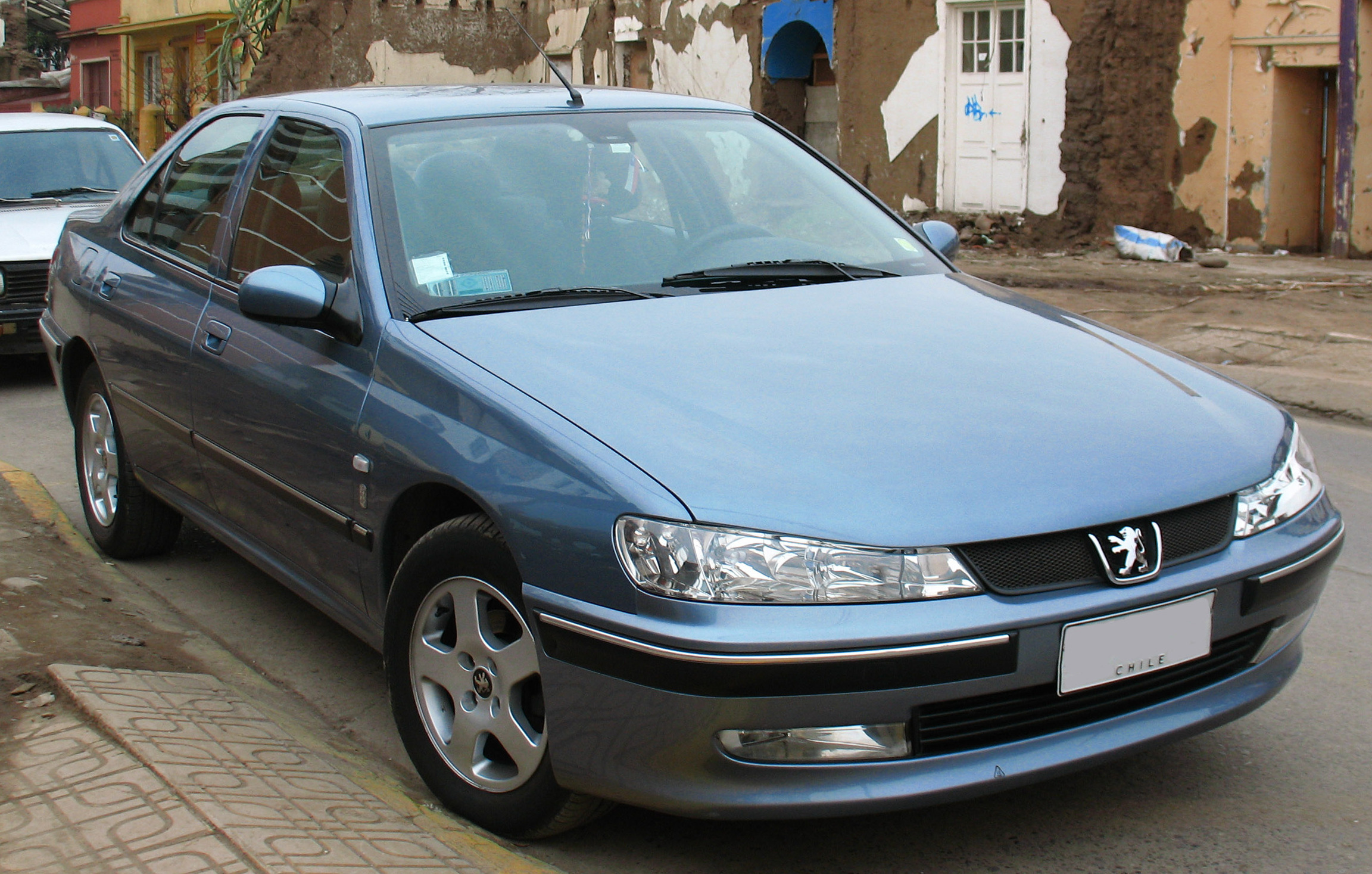
406 ST Phase 2 (Chile)

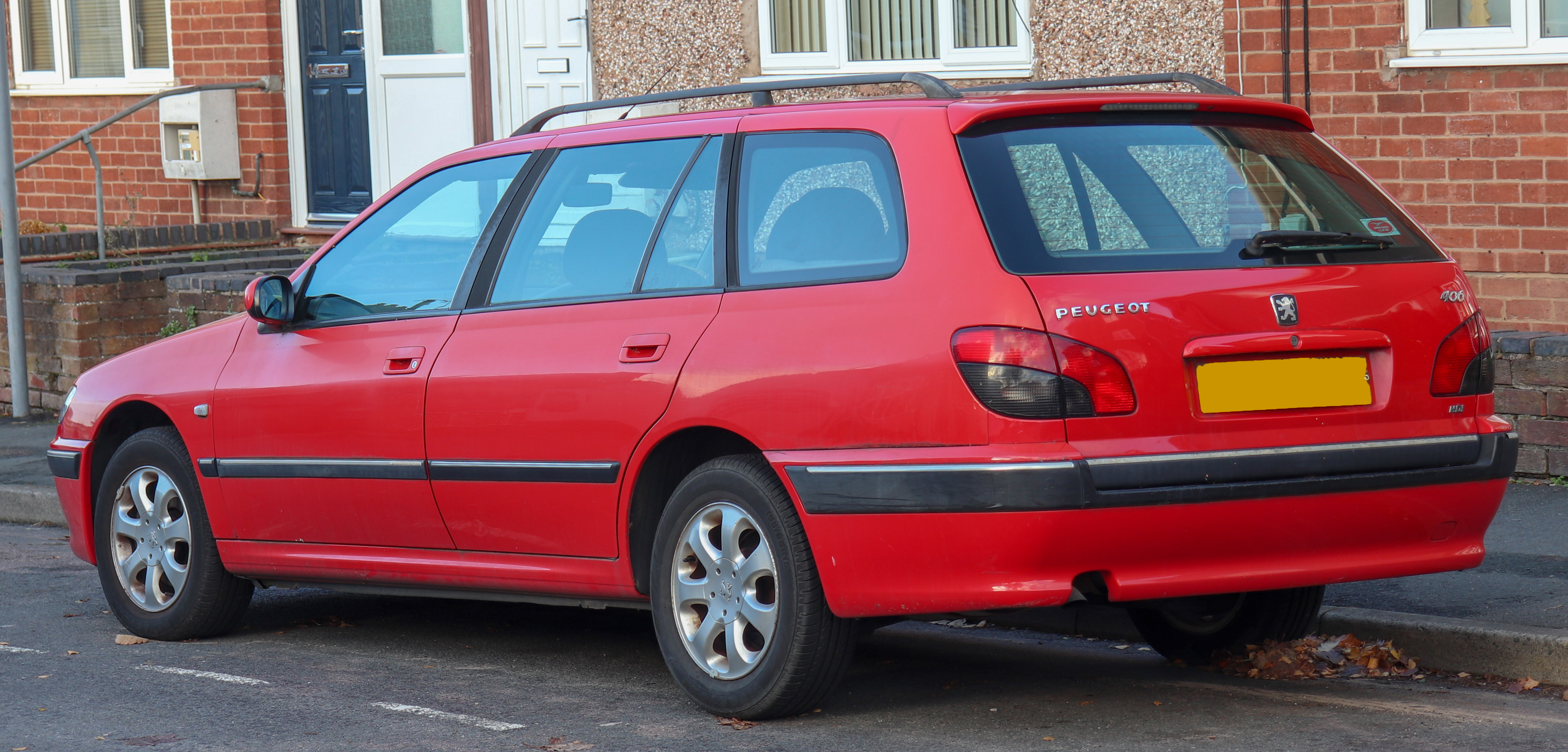
406 SW Phase II (UK)

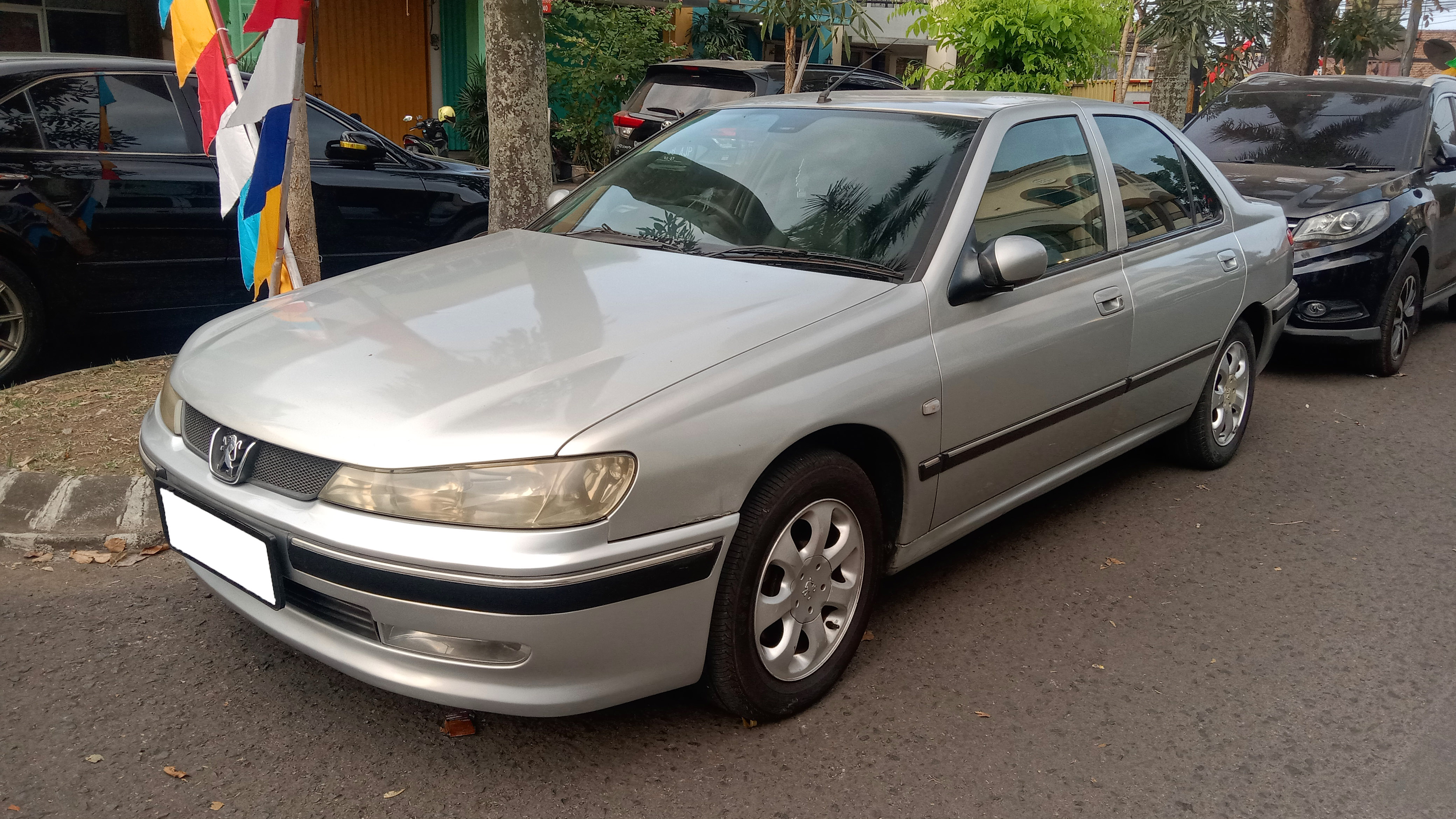
406 Phase 2 (Indonesia, front view)

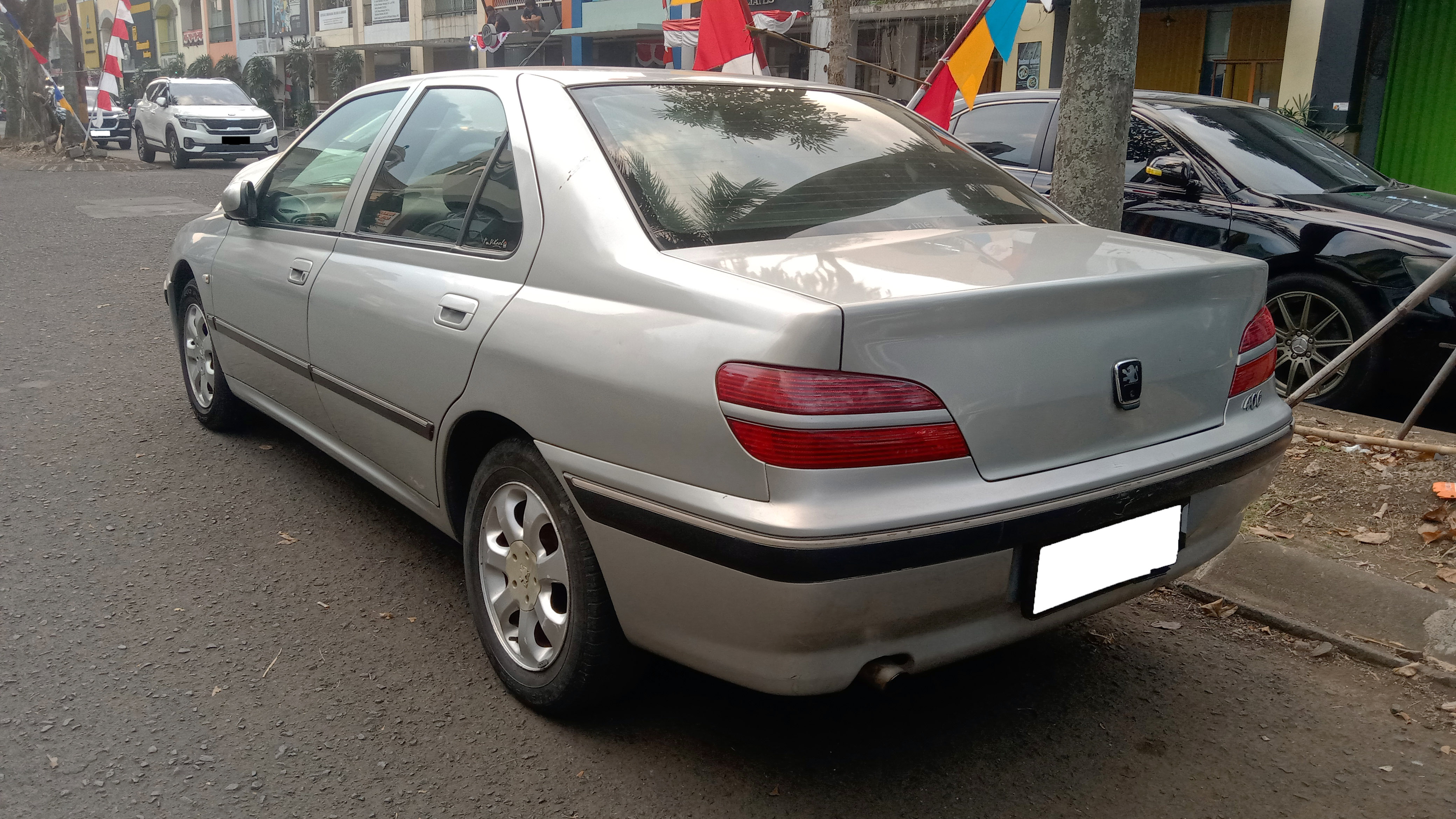
406 Phase 2 (Indonesia, rear view)

== Coupé Phase 2 ==
The exterior was mostly unchanged on the coupé. The side turnlight was the first update, and new rims and a new front bumper were added later on.

The interior was updated in the same manner as the saloon and estate, with updated dashboard and instrument panel and colours.

Technical updates also followed the saloon/estate, but the engine range grew to four with the addition of the 2.2 petrol and 2.2HDi, the latter with Brembo front brakes.

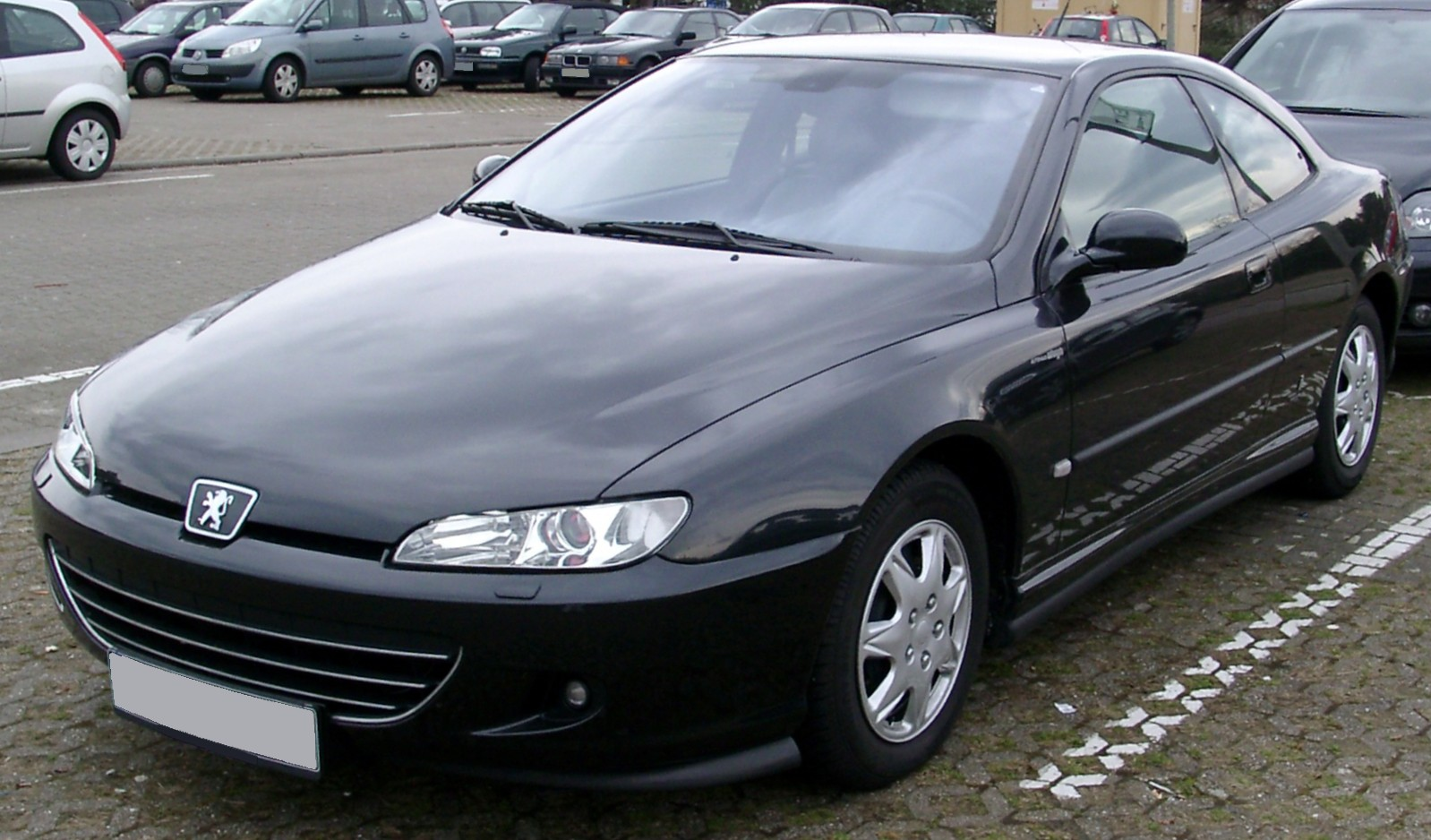
Peugeot 406 Coupé (2003 facelift)

== Awards ==
The 406 was awarded 1997 What Car? Car of the Year, as well as 1997 and 2001 Caravan Club Towcar of the Year. It was also awarded Semperit Irish Car of the Year for 1997, however, it lost out by a narrow margin of 15 points in the 1996 European Car of the Year award to the Fiat Bravo/Brava.

== Motorsport ==
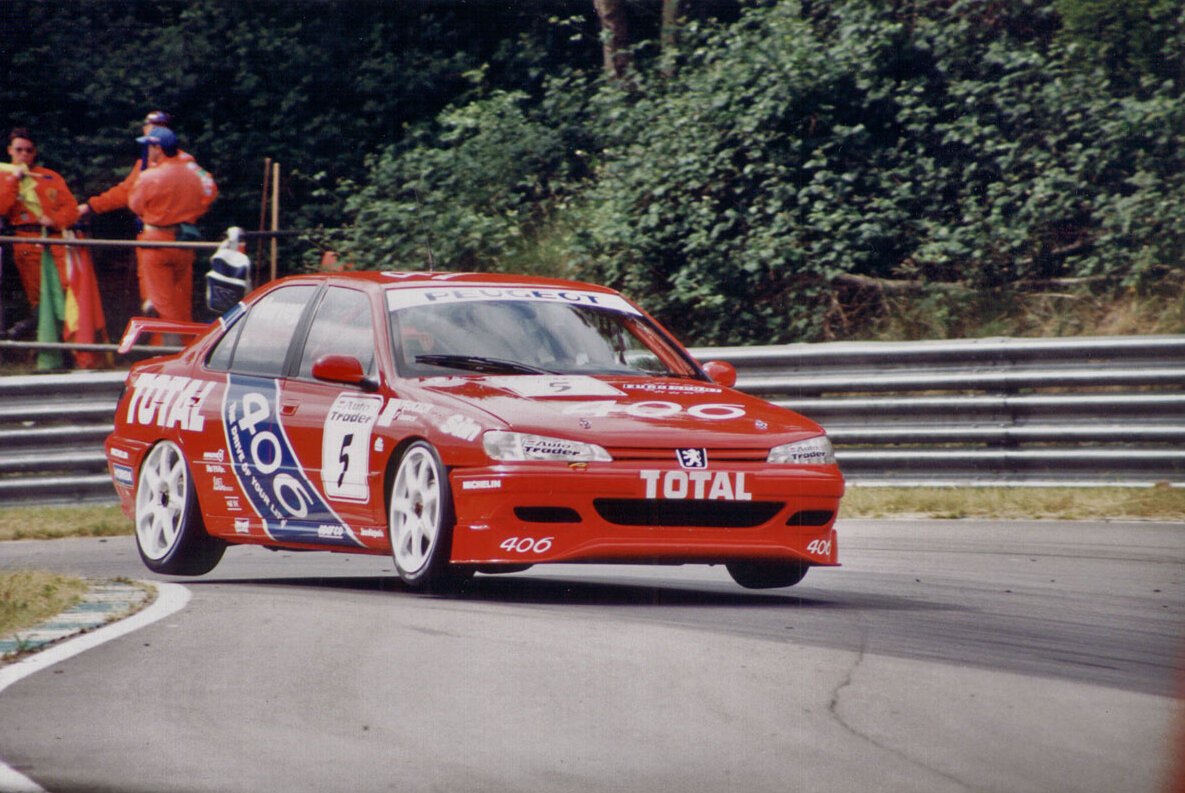
BTCC Peugeot 406 built to Super Touring regulations.

The Peugeot 406 competed in several Supertouring championships from 1996 to 2004. Laurent Aïello won the 1997 ADAC Deutsche Super Touren Wagen-Cup, while William David won the French Touring Car Championship in 1999 and 2000. Cacá Bueno and Emiliano Spataro shared the 1999 South American Super Touring Car Championship as they tied in points, wins and the remaining tiebreakers. The 406 Supertouring was also used in the British Touring Car Championship between 1996 and 2004.

The 406 also competed as silhouette at the French Touring Car Championship, winning the 2002 and 2004 titles with Soheil Ayari, as well as the Top Race.
