= Norisring Nürnberg 200 Speedweekend =

Layout of the Norisring

The ADAC Norisring Nürnberg 200 Speedweekend (previously known as ADAC Norisring Trophäe (Norisring Trophy)) is an auto racing event taking place at the Norisring temporary street circuit in Nuremberg, Germany. First ran in 1967, the Trophy has hosted a variety of national and international series, ranging from touring cars to sports cars. The Norisring Trophy is currently part of the Deutsche Tourenwagen Masters series.

== History ==
Sports car racing started at the Norisring in 1967 as a 200 mi (320 km) exhibition event backed by the Allgemeiner Deutscher Automobil-Club (ADAC) without any championship affiliation. By 1970 the event had become part of the Interserie championship calendar, remaining as the Trophy event even when it began to share with the new Deutsche Rennsport Meisterschaft (DRM) series in 1973. The DRM however became the holder of the Norisring Trophy from 1974 to 1977, with an exception for 1975 when it was awarded to a European GT Championship race.

Although the DRM continued to run at the Norisring, a non-championship race was held for the Norisring Trophy for a variety of years from 1978 to 1985. After the demise of the DRM at the end of 1985, the new ADAC Supercup series ran the Norisring Trophy, although the event was shared with the World Sports-Prototype Championship in 1986 and 1987. The Supercup series was however short lived, and in 1990 the Norisring Trophy switched to touring car series.

The national Deutsche Tourenwagen Meisterschaft series picked the Norisring Trophy as one of their events, holding twin races every year until 1996 (when the series ran under the International Tour Car Championship guise). This series too did not last, and a series based on the global Super Touring formula took over, running twin races until 1999.

A new Deutsche Tourenwagen Masters series was developed in 2000, and they once again competed for the Norisring Trophy. Their first year they used the twin race format before a single, longer race became the standard in 2001.

This race was also known after the death of Pedro Rodríguez during the 1971 event.

== Other races ==
The Norisring race weekend combines a variety of series and racing formats. However, only one race each year is designated the Norisring Trophy. This race, usually the longest race of the event at approximately 200 miles, is supported by several smaller series which run equal or shorter distances. Although the DRM raced at the Norisring every year from 1974 to 1985, it served as the support race several times. The BMW M1 Procar Championship also raced at the Norisring in 1980. The ADAC GT Masters sports car series currently serves as the support race for the DTM at the Norisring.

== Trophy winners ==
Year	Driver(s)	Team	Car	Series
3.9 km (2.4 mi) circuit
1967	(Australia) Frank Gardner	(United Kingdom) Sid Taylor	Lola T70 Mk.3-Chevrolet	Non-championship
1968	(United Kingdom) David Piper	(United Kingdom) Piper Racing	Ferrari 330 P3/4	Non-championship
1969	(United Kingdom) Brian Redman	(United Kingdom) Sid Taylor	Lola T70 Mk.3-Chevrolet	Non-championship
1970	(West Germany) Jürgen Neuhaus	(West Germany) Gesipa Racing Team	Porsche 917K	Interserie
1971	(United Kingdom) Chris Craft	(United Kingdom) Ecurie Evergreen	McLaren M8E-Chevrolet	Interserie
2.3 km (1.4 mi) circuit
1972	(Finland) Leo Kinnunen	(Finland) AAW Racing Team	Porsche 917/10 TC	Interserie
1973	(Finland) Leo Kinnunen	(Finland) AAW Racing Team	Porsche 917/10 TC	Interserie
1974	(West Germany) Hans-Joachim Stuck	(West Germany) BMW Motorsport GmbH	BMW 3.0 CSL	Non-championship
1975	(United Kingdom) John Fitzpatrick	(West Germany) Gelo Racing	Porsche Carrera RSR	Non-championship
1976	(France) Bob Wollek	(West Germany) Vaillant Kremer Racing	Porsche 934	DRM (Division 1)
1976	(West Germany) Klaus Ludwig	(West Germany) Europa Möbel Team Zakspeed	Ford Escort II	DRM (Division 2)
1977	(Liechtenstein) Manfred Schurti	(West Germany) Max Moritz	Porsche 935	Non-championship
1978	(France) Bob Wollek	(West Germany) Vaillant Kremer Racing	Porsche 935/77A	Non-championship
1979	(West Germany) Rolf Stommelen	(West Germany) Liqui Moly Equipe	Porsche 935J	Non-championship
1980	(United Kingdom) John Fitzpatrick	(United States) Dick Barbour Racing	Porsche 935 K3/80	DRM (Division 1)
1980	(Austria) Harald Ertl	(West Germany) Sachs Sporting	Ford Capri Turbo	DRM (Division 2)
1981	(France) Bob Wollek	(West Germany) Jägermeister Kremer Racing	Porsche 935 K4	Non-championship
1982	(Germany) Hans-Joachim Stuck	(West Germany) Schnitzer Eterna Meisterfoto Team	BMW M1	Non-championship
1983	(West Germany) Stefan Bellof	(West Germany) Rothmans Porsche	Porsche 956	Non-championship
1984	(West Germany) Manfred Winkelhock	(West Germany) Liqui Moly Kremer	Porsche 956B	Non-championship
1985	(West Germany) Klaus Ludwig	(West Germany) Porsche Kremer Racing	Porsche 956	Non-Championship
1986	(West Germany) Klaus Ludwig	(West Germany) Blaupunkt Joest Racing	Porsche 956B	WSPC & Supercup
1987	(United Kingdom) Jonathan Palmer (Italy) Mauro Baldi	(United Kingdom) Liqui Moly Equipe	Porsche 962C GTi	WSPC
1988	(France) Jean-Louis Schlesser	(Switzerland) Team Sauber Mercedes	Sauber C9-Mercedes	Supercup
1989	(West Germany) Frank Jelinski	(West Germany) Joest Racing	Porsche 962C	Supercup
1990	(West Germany) Hans-Joachim Stuck	(West Germany) SMS Competition	Audi V8 quattro	DTM (Race 1)
1990	(Italy) Roberto Ravaglia	(West Germany) Schnitzer Motorsport	BMW M3	DTM (Race 2)
1991	(Denmark) Kurt Thiim	(Germany) AMG Racing	Mercedes-Benz 190E	DTM (Race 1)
1991	(Germany) Hans-Joachim Stuck	(Germany) SMS Competition	Audi V8 quattro	DTM (Race 2)
1992	(Germany) Joachim Winkelhock	(Germany) Schnitzer Motorsport	BMW M3	DTM (Race 1)
1992	(United Kingdom) Steve Soper	(Italy) Scuderia Bigazzi	BMW M3	DTM (Race 2)
1993	(Italy) Nicola Larini	(Italy) Alfa Corse	Alfa Romeo 155 V6 TI	DTM (Race 1)
1993	(Italy) Nicola Larini	(Italy) Alfa Corse	Alfa Romeo 155 V6 TI	DTM (Race 2)
1994	(Italy) Nicola Larini	(Italy) Alfa Corse	Alfa Romeo 155 V6 TI	DTM (Race 1)
1994	(Denmark) Kris Nissen	(Germany) Schübel Engineering	Alfa Romeo 155 V6 TI	DTM (Race 2)
1995	(Germany) Christian Danner	(Germany) Schübel Engineering	Alfa Romeo 155 V6 TI	DTM (Race 1)
1995	(Germany) Bernd Schneider	(Germany) AMG Racing	Mercedes-Benz C-Klasse	DTM (Race 2)
1996	(Germany) Klaus Ludwig	(Germany) Opel Team Zakspeed	Opel Calibra V6	ITC (Race 1)
1996	(Germany) Klaus Ludwig	(Germany) Opel Team Zakspeed	Opel Calibra V6	ITC (Race 2)
1997	(Germany) Joachim Winkelhock	(Italy) BMW Team Bigazzi	BMW 320i	STW (Race 1)
1997	(Germany) Joachim Winkelhock	(Italy) BMW Team Bigazzi	BMW 320i	STW (Race 2)
1998	(Germany) Jörg van Ommen	(France) Peugeot Esso	Peugeot 406	STW (Race 1)
1998	(France) Laurent Aïello	(France) Peugeot Esso	Peugeot 406	STW (Race 2)
1999	(Germany) Uwe Alzen	(Germany) Warsteiner Team Holzer	Opel Vectra	STW (Race 1)
1999	(Germany) Manuel Reuter	(Germany) Warsteiner Team Holzer	Opel Vectra	STW (Race 2)
2000	(Germany) Joachim Winkelhock	(Germany) Opel Team Holzer	Opel Astra V8 Coupé	DTM (Race 1)
2000	(Germany) Bernd Schneider	(Germany) D2 AMG-Mercedes	Mercedes-Benz CLK-DTM	DTM (Race 2)
2001	(Germany) Uwe Alzen	(Germany) AMG-Mercedes	Mercedes-Benz CLK-DTM	DTM
2002	(France) Laurent Aïello	(Germany) Abt Sportsline	Abt Audi TT-R	DTM
2003	(Netherlands) Christijan Albers	(Germany) AMG-Mercedes	Mercedes-Benz CLK-DTM	DTM
2004	(United Kingdom) Gary Paffett	(Germany) AMG-Mercedes	Mercedes-Benz C-Klasse	DTM
2005	(United Kingdom) Gary Paffett	(Germany) AMG-Mercedes	Mercedes-Benz C-Klasse	DTM
2006	(Canada) Bruno Spengler	(Germany) H.W.A. GmbH	Mercedes-Benz C-Klasse	DTM
2007	(Canada) Bruno Spengler	(Germany) DaimlerChrysler Bank AMG-Mercedes	Mercedes-Benz C-Klasse	DTM
2008	(United Kingdom) Jamie Green	(Germany) Salzgitter AMG-Mercedes	Mercedes-Benz C-Klasse	DTM
2009	(United Kingdom) Jamie Green	(Germany) Persson Motorsport	Mercedes-Benz C-Klasse	DTM
2010	(United Kingdom) Jamie Green	(Germany) Persson Motorsport	Mercedes-Benz C-Klasse	DTM
2011	(Canada) Bruno Spengler	(Germany) Team H.W.A.	Mercedes-Benz C-Klasse	DTM
2012	(United Kingdom) Jamie Green	(Germany) Team H.W.A.	DTM AMG Mercedes C-Coupé	DTM
2013	No winner (Note: Mattias Ekström was disqualified from the race after infringing parc ferme regulations. Following an appeal by Abt Sportsline to the Deutscher Motor Sport Bund, the disqualification was confirmed; however, drivers were not promoted in the race results, and as such, no driver was officially recognised as having finished in first place.)			DTM
2014	(Canada) Robert Wickens	(Germany) HWA Team	DTM AMG Mercedes C-Coupé	DTM
2015	(Germany) Pascal Wehrlein	(Germany) HWA Team	DTM AMG Mercedes C-Coupé	DTM (Race 1)
2015	(Canada) Robert Wickens	(Germany) HWA Team	DTM AMG Mercedes C-Coupé	DTM (Race 2)
2016	(Italy) Edoardo Mortara	(Germany) Audi Sport Team Abt Sportsline	Audi RS5 DTM	DTM (Race 1)
2016	(Switzerland) Nico Müller	(Germany) Audi Sport Team Abt	Audi RS5 DTM	DTM (Race 2)
2017	(Canada) Bruno Spengler	(Belgium) BMW Team RBM	BMW M4 DTM	DTM (Race 1)
2017	(Belgium) Maxime Martin	(Belgium) BMW Team RBM	BMW M4 DTM	DTM (Race 2)
2018	(Italy) Edoardo Mortara	(Germany) HWA Team	Mercedes-AMG C63 DTM	DTM (Race 1)
2018	(Germany) Marco Wittmann	(Germany) BMW Team RMG	BMW M4 DTM	DTM (Race 2)
2019	(Germany) René Rast	(Germany) Audi Sport Team Rosberg	Audi RS5 Turbo DTM 2019	DTM (Race 1)
2019	(Canada) Bruno Spengler	(Germany) BMW Team RMG	BMW M4 Turbo DTM 2019	DTM (Race 2)
2020	Not held due to the COVID-19 pandemic			
2021	(Germany) Maximilian Götz	(Germany) Mercedes-AMG Team HRT	Mercedes-AMG GT3 Evo	DTM (Race 1)
2021	(Germany) Maximilian Götz	(Germany) Mercedes-AMG Team HRT	Mercedes-AMG GT3 Evo	DTM (Race 2)
2022	(Austria) Thomas Preining	(Germany) KÜS Team Bernhard	Porsche 911 (991) GT3 R	DTM (Race 1)
2022	(Brazil) Felipe Fraga	(Italy) Red Bull AlphaTauri AF Corse	Ferrari 488 GT3 Evo 2020	DTM (Race 2)
2023	(South Africa) Sheldon van der Linde	(Germany) Schubert Motorsport	BMW M4 GT3	DTM (Race 1)
2023	(Austria) Thomas Preining	(Germany) Manthey EMA	Porsche 911 (992) GT3 R	DTM (Race 2)
2024	(Germany) René Rast	(Germany) Schubert Motorsport	BMW M4 GT3	DTM (Race 1)
2024	(Denmark) Nicki Thiim	(Germany) SSR Performance	Lamborghini Huracán GT3 Evo 2	DTM (Race 2)
