= Mercedes-Benz DTM V8 engine =

Mercedes-Benz DTM V8 racing engine

Overview
- Manufacturer: Mercedes-Benz
- Production: 2000-2018

Layout
- Configuration: Naturally aspirated 90° V8
- Displacement: 4.0 L (244 cu in)
- Valvetrain: 32-valve, DOHC, four-valves per cylinder

Combustion
- Turbocharger: No
- Fuel system: Bosch Electronic indirect multi-point fuel injection
- Management: Bosch
- Fuel type: Aral Ultimate 102 RON racing gasoline
- Oil system: Dry sump (Mobil 1; later Petronas Syntium 7000 oil)

Output
- Power output: 460–580 hp (343–433 kW)
- Torque output: 360–413 lb⋅ft (488–560 N⋅m)

The Mercedes-Benz DTM V8 engine is a prototype, four-stroke, 4.0-liter, naturally aspirated V8 racing engines, developed and produced by Mercedes-Benz for the Deutsche Tourenwagen Masters, between 2000 and 2018.

== Engine ==
The Mercedes-Benz DTM V8 engine is a 4,000 cc (4.0 L; 244.1 cu in), naturally-aspirated, V8 engine, with a power output of between 476–500 hp (355–373 kW; 483–507 PS) and a maximum torque 490–500 N⋅m (361–369 lbf⋅ft). It is a 90-degree V8 engine with four-valves per cylinder, uses indirect fuel injection, and has 2 x 28 mm air restrictors due to regulations.

== Applications ==
- AMG-Mercedes CLK-DTM
- Mercedes-Benz AMG C-Class DTM (W203)
- Mercedes-Benz AMG C-Class DTM (W204)
- Mercedes-AMG C-Coupé DTM
