= Mercedes-Benz CLK DTM =

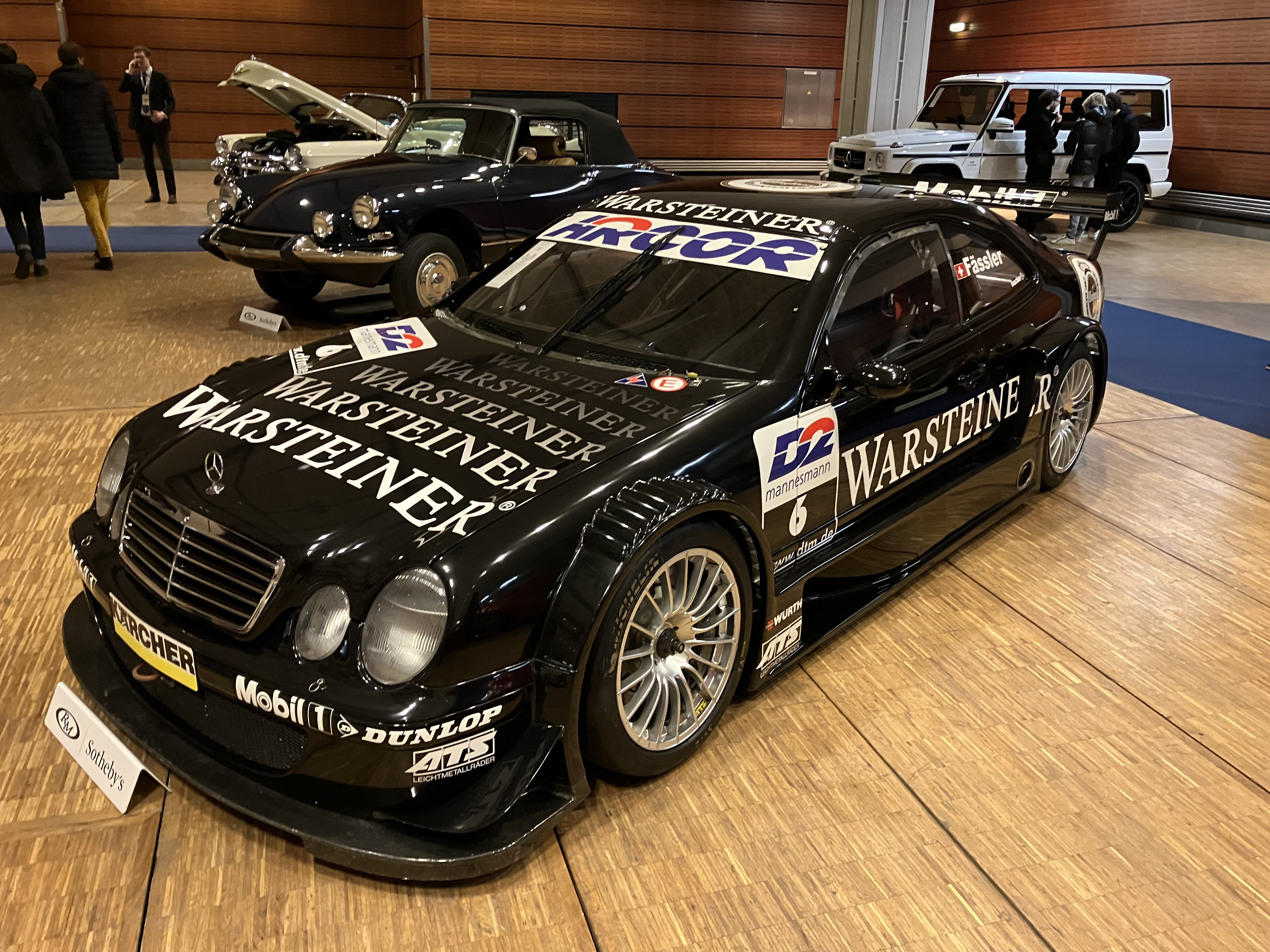
- Category: Deutsche Tourenwagen Masters (Touring Cars)
- Constructor: (Germany) Mercedes-Benz
- Successor: Mercedes-Benz AMG C-Class DTM (W203)

Technical specifications
- Chassis: Carbon-fibre composite on steel tubular frame
- Suspension: Double wishbones, push-rod actuated coil springs and shock absorbers, anti-roll bar
- Length: 4,690 mm (185 in)
- Width: 1,845 mm (73 in)
- Height: 1,255 mm (49 in)
- Wheelbase: 2,695 mm (106 in)
- Engine: Mercedes-Benz 4.0 L (244 cu in) V8 90-degree DOHC naturally aspirated front engine
- Transmission: Xtrac 6-speed sequential manual sport gearbox
- Power: 470 hp (350 kW)
- Weight: 1,080 kg (2,381 lb) (including driver)
- Fuel: Aral Ultimate
- Lubricants: Mobil 1
- Brakes: Internally-ventilated carbon ceramic discs, all-round
- Tyres: Dunlop SP Sport Maxx; Front: 265/660 - R18; Rear: 280/660 - R18; AVUS forged aluminium wheels Front: 12 x 18 inches Rear: 13 x 18 inches

Competition history
- Debut: 2000 Hockenheimring-1 DTM round

The Mercedes-Benz CLK DTM is a 2-door DTM touring car constructed by the German car manufacturer Mercedes-Benz, that debuted in the 2000 DTM season, and competed until the end of the 2003 season. It was based on the standard Mercedes-Benz CLK-Class (C208) road car then later the CLK-Class (C209).

== History ==
For the 2000 DTM season, Mercedes-Benz committed to entering eight cars split between four cars from the Works HWA Team, and two cars each from the semi-Works Persson and Rosberg outfits. HWA, in turn, sub-divided its operations into two parallel squads. The first ran two D2 Telekom-sponsored cars for Bernd Schneider and Thomas Jäger, the second fielding two Warsteiner-backed cars for Klaus Ludwig, and Marcel Fässler.

In March 2002, Mercedes-Benz announced a revised version of the CLK DTM now based on the CLK-Class (C209), at the Geneva Motor Show with Bernd Schneider and Jean Alesi. The car won the 2003 DTM season.

== Gallery ==
CLK DTM C208

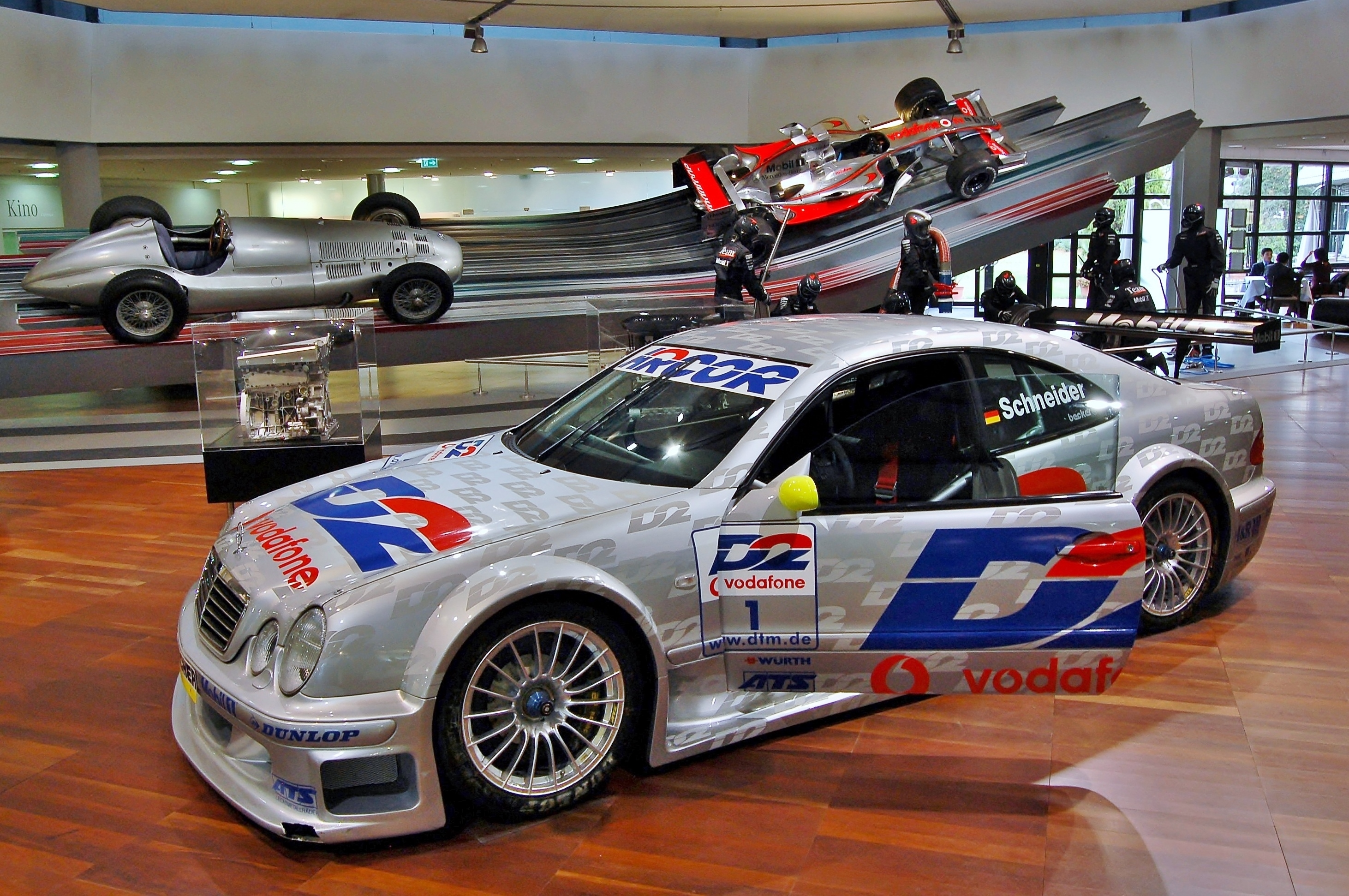

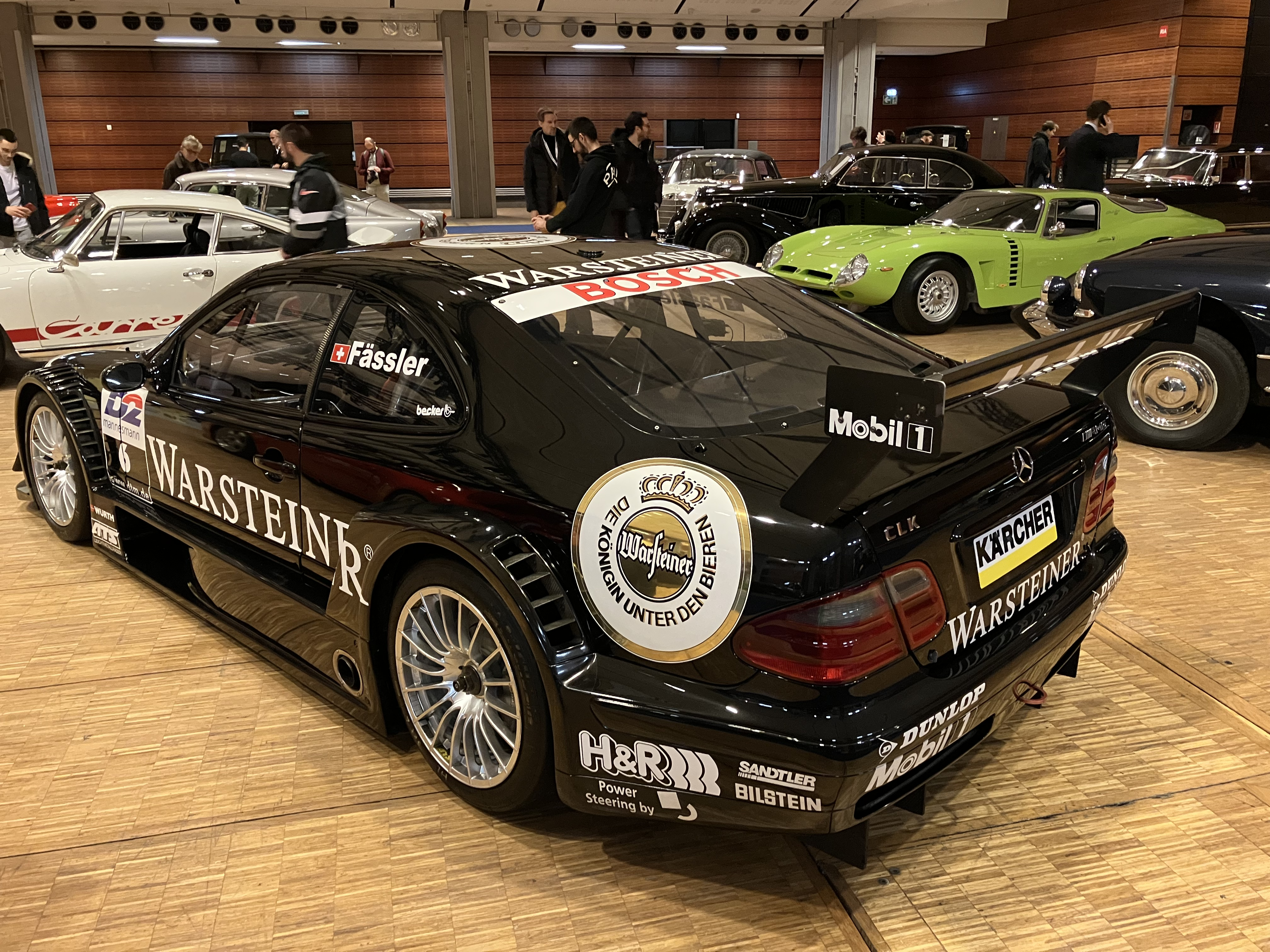

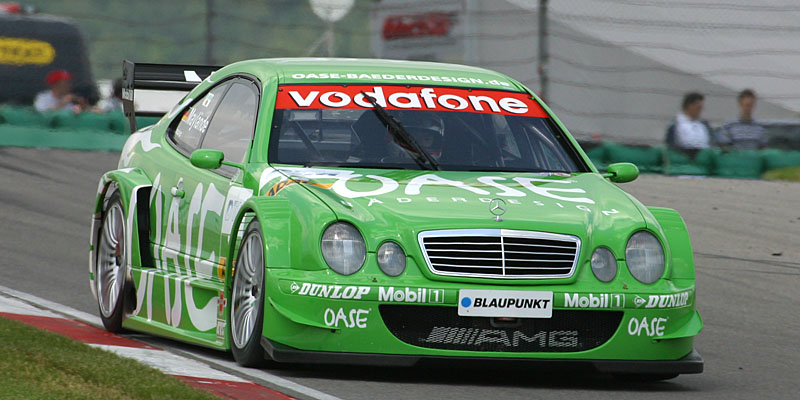
CLK DTM C209

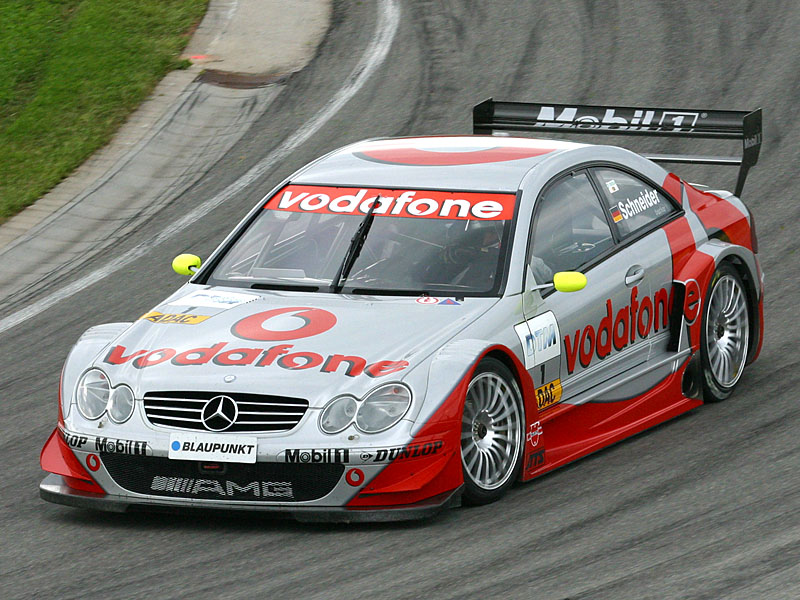

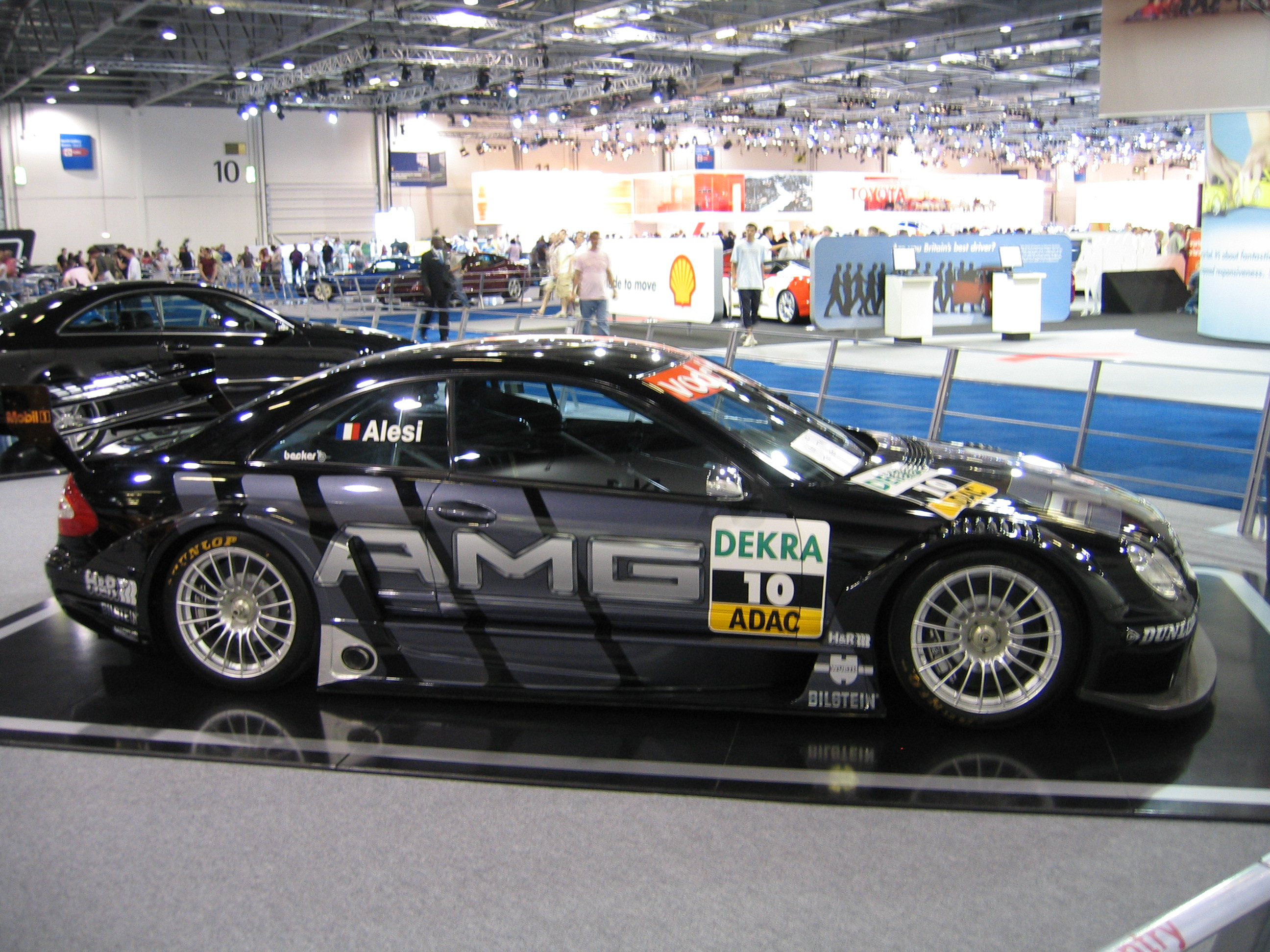

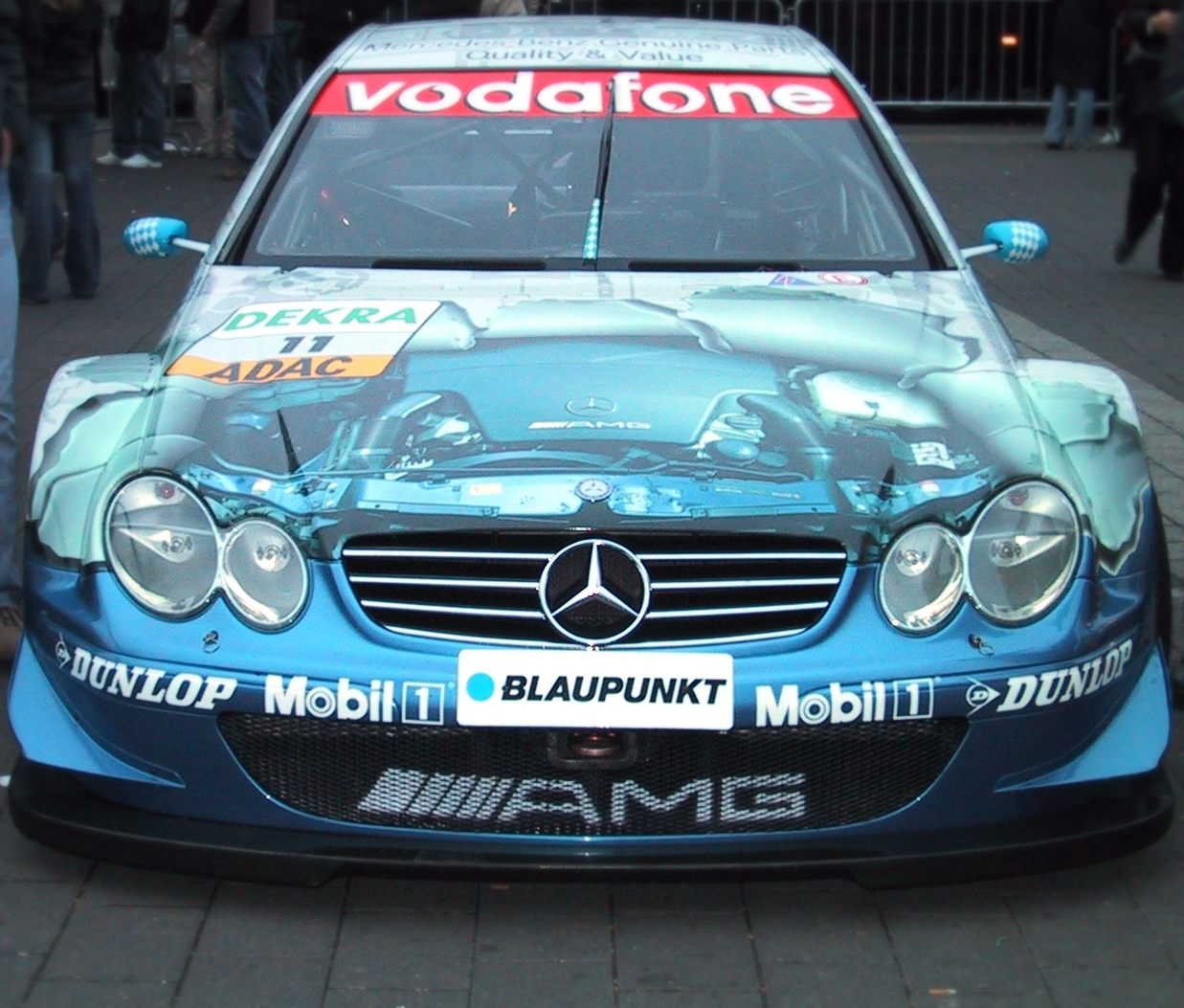

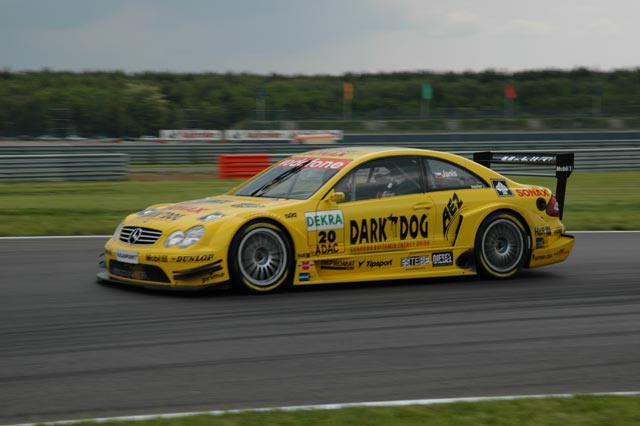
