= Mercedes-Benz AMG C-Class DTM (W204) =

Mercedes-Benz AMG C-Class W204 DTM
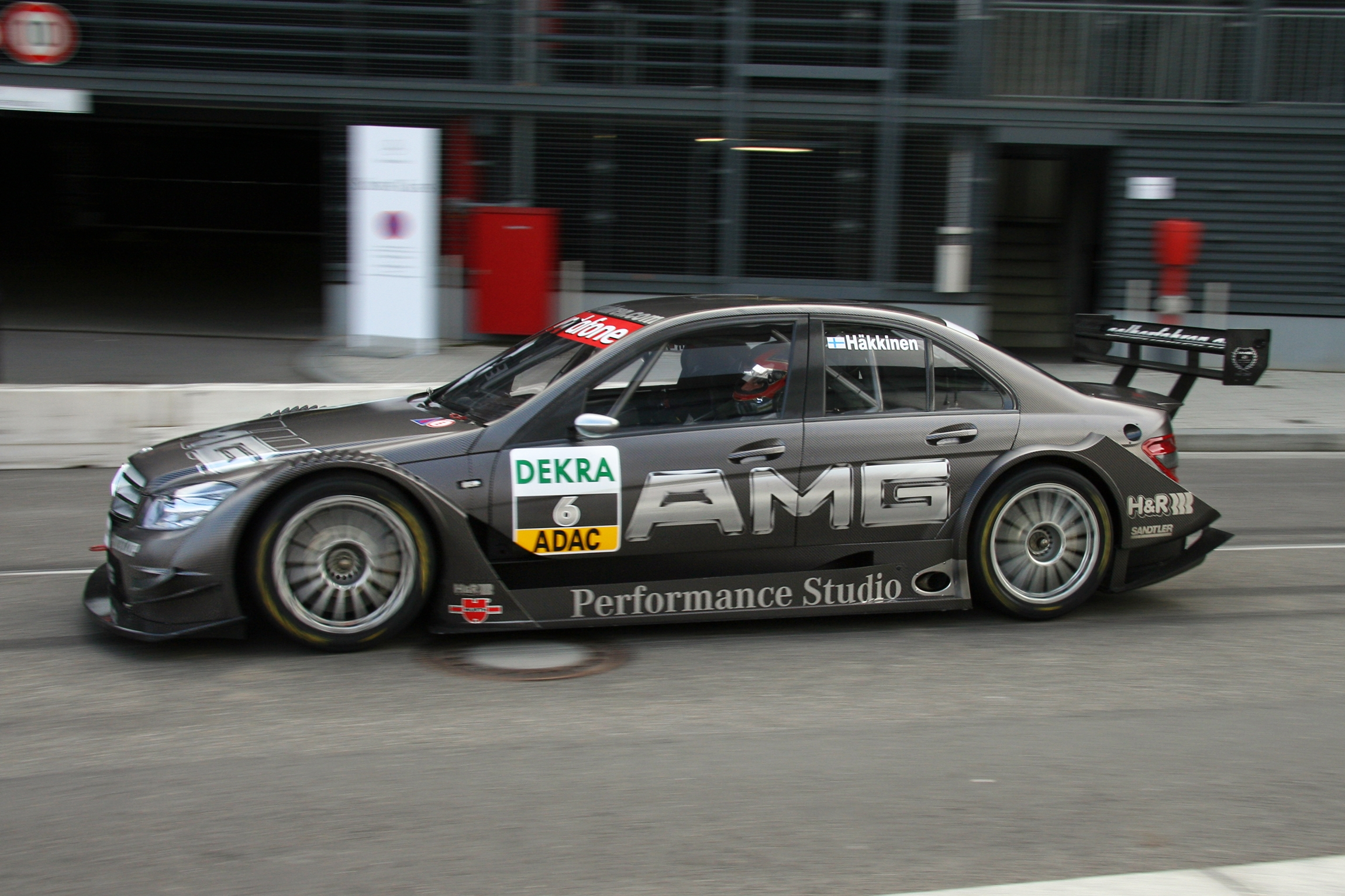
- Mika Häkkinen drove his Mercedes-Benz AMG C-Class W204 DTM during 2007 Stars & Cars
- Category: Deutsche Tourenwagen Masters (Touring Cars)
- Constructor: (Germany) Mercedes-Benz
- Predecessor: Mercedes-Benz AMG C-Class W203 DTM
- Successor: Mercedes-Benz AMG C63 Class Coupé DTM

Technical specifications
- Chassis: Carbon-fibre composite monocoque
- Suspension (front): Double wishbones with H&R spring/damper units to front and rear axles, actuated via pushrods
- Suspension (rear): As front
- Length: 4,872 mm (192 in)
- Width: 1,845 mm (73 in)
- Height: 1,255 mm (49 in)
- Wheelbase: 2,795 mm (110 in)
- Engine: Mercedes-Benz 4,000 cc (244 cu in) V8 90 degree naturally aspirated front engined
- Transmission: Xtrac (2007) later Hewland (2008-2011) 6-speed sequential manual sport gearbox
- Power: Approx. 460 hp (343 kW)
- Weight: 1,040 kg (2,293 lb) in 2007-2008; 1,050 kg (2,315 lb) in 2009-2011 (including driver)
- Fuel: Aral Ultimate 102 RON
- Lubricants: Mobil 1 (2007-2010); Petronas Syntium (2011)
- Tyres: Dunlop SP Sport Maxx (2007-2010); Hankook Ventus (2011); Front: 265/660 - R18; Rear: 280/660 - R18; AMG forged aluminium wheels Front: 12 x 18 inches 13 x 18 inches

Competition history
- Notable entrants: (Germany) HWA Team (Germany) Mücke Motorsport (Germany) Persson Motorsport
- Notable drivers: (Germany) Bernd Schneider (Canada) Bruno Spengler (United Kingdom) Jamie Green (Finland) Mika Häkkinen (United Kingdom) Paul di Resta (United Kingdom) Gary Paffett (Austria) Mathias Lauda (Germany) Ralf Schumacher (Germany) Maro Engel (United Kingdom) Susie Wolff (United Kingdom) David Coulthard (China) Congfu Cheng (Germany) Christian Vietoris (Netherlands) Renger van der Zande
- Debut: 2007 Hockenheimring DTM round
Races	Wins	Poles	F/Laps
54 (including non-championship race at Olympiastadion Munich)	31	21	25
- Constructors' Championships: 1
- Drivers' Championships: 1

The Mercedes-Benz AMG C-Class W204 DTM is a DTM-championship touring car constructed by the German car manufacturer Mercedes-Benz. It was the facelift version of the Mercedes-Benz AMG C-Class W203 DTM and based on the Mercedes-Benz C-Class W204 second generation car. The Mercedes-Benz AMG C-Class W204 DTM was unveiled at the 2007 Geneva Motor Show.

== Technical details ==
Like all racing cars in the DTM it is based on the C-Class W203 DTM and looked like the eponymous series cars. The prototype was constructed on a CFK - monocoque chassis with an integrated 70 L (18.5 US gal) fuel tank. Since refuelling at this time was still allowed in the race, a 120 L (31.7 US gal) tank was not built as from 2012. The C-Class W204 DTM is powered by a 4 L Mercedes-Benz naturally-aspirated V8 engine, power output approximately 350 kW (476 PS) and maximum torque approximately 500 N⋅m (369 lb⋅ft). The rear-wheel drive C-Class DTM also has a sequential 6-speed sports transmission, a 3-plate carbon fiber clutch supplied by Sandtler (2007-2010), then ZF (2011) and an adjustable multi-disc limited-slip differential, check by Mercedes diagnostic tool.
