= Mücke Motorsport =

German auto racing team

(Germany) Mücke Motorsport
- Founded: 1998
- Base: Berlin, Germany
- Team principal(s): Peter Mücke
- Current series: ADAC GT4 Germany
- Former series: European Formula 3 German Formula 3 Formula BMW ADAC; Formula BMW Europe; GP3 Series; Formula 3 Euro Series; ADAC Formel Masters; ADAC GT Masters; ADAC Formula 4 Italian F4 Championship; Formula 4 UAE Championship; DTM; DTM Trophy; Prototype Cup Germany
- Current drivers: (United Kingdom) Alex Connor (Germany) Maruis Schmid
- Teams' Championships: ADAC Formel Masters: 2013
- Drivers' Championships: Formula BMW ADAC: 1998: Stefan Mücke; 2004: Sebastian Vettel; ADAC Formel Masters: 2011: Pascal Wehrlein; 2013: Alessio Picariello

Mücke Motorsport (also known as ADAC Berlin-Brandenburg) is an auto racing team based in Germany. They currently only compete in the ADAC GT4 Germany.

== History ==
=== Single-seaters ===
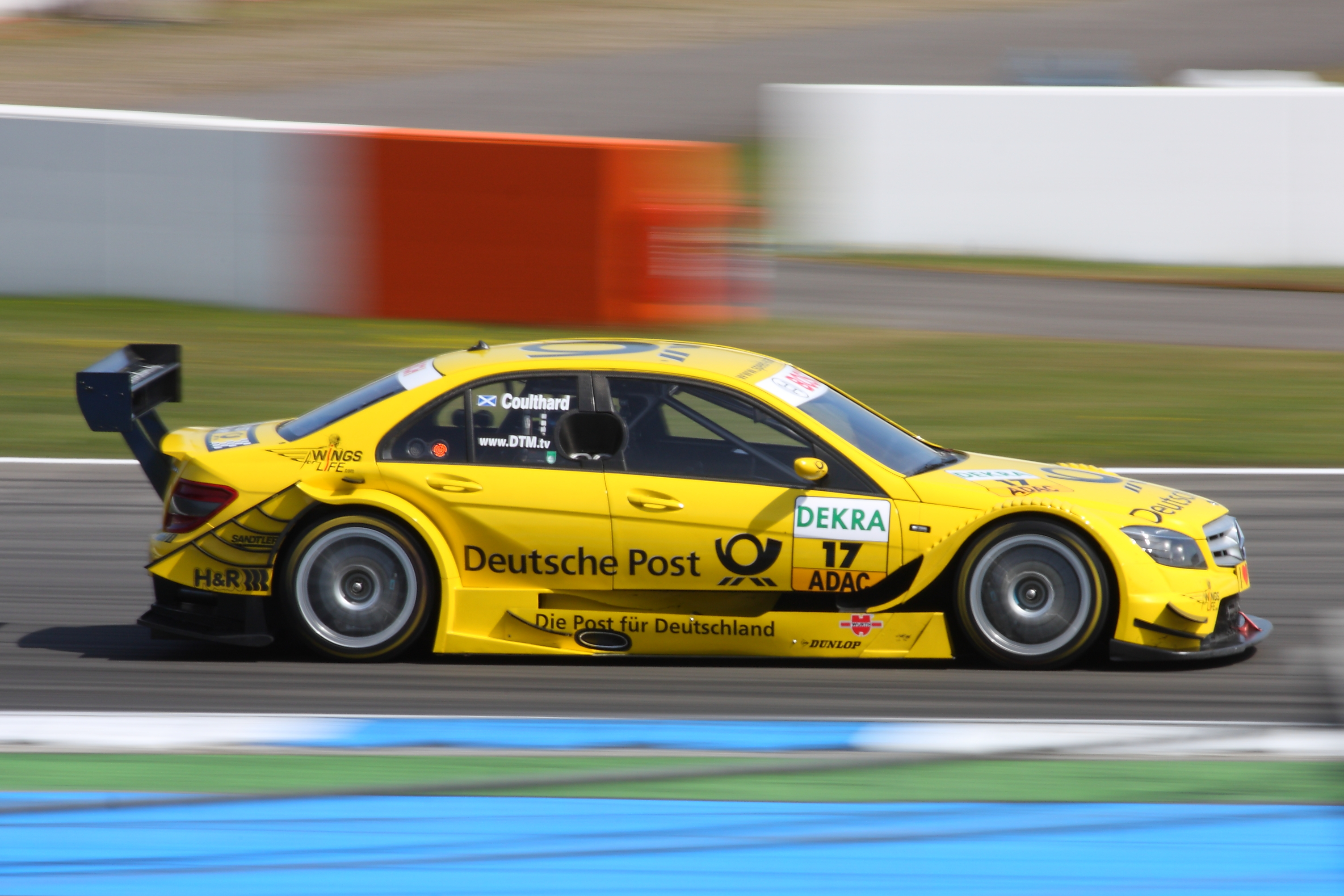
Mücke Motorsport

Mücke Motorsport was formed by Peter Mücke in 1998 to run his son Stefan Mücke in the German Formula BMW ADAC series, in which they were champions. Stefan and the team moved to German Formula Three in 1999, where the driver finished runner-up in 2001. Also in 2001, Markus Winkelhock joined the team. After Stefan left Formula 3 for the DTM in 2002, Winkelhock was joined by Sven Heidfeld and Marcel Lasée. The team moved to the new Formula Three Euroseries in 2003, where Christian Klien finished runner-up.

Mücke competed in Formula BMW ADAC from 1998 to 2007. Sebastian Vettel won the title for the team in 2004.

For 2010, Peter Mücke's partnership with Ralf Schumacher sees the RSC Mücke Motorsport team enter the newly formed GP3 Series. Dutchman Renger van der Zande spearheads the driver line-up alongside compatriot Nigel Melker and German Tobias Hegewald.

The team operated in Formula 4 from 2015 to 2021 before they closed their open-wheeler program citing cost concerns. PHM Racing was created using assets and personnel left over from the program.

=== DTM ===
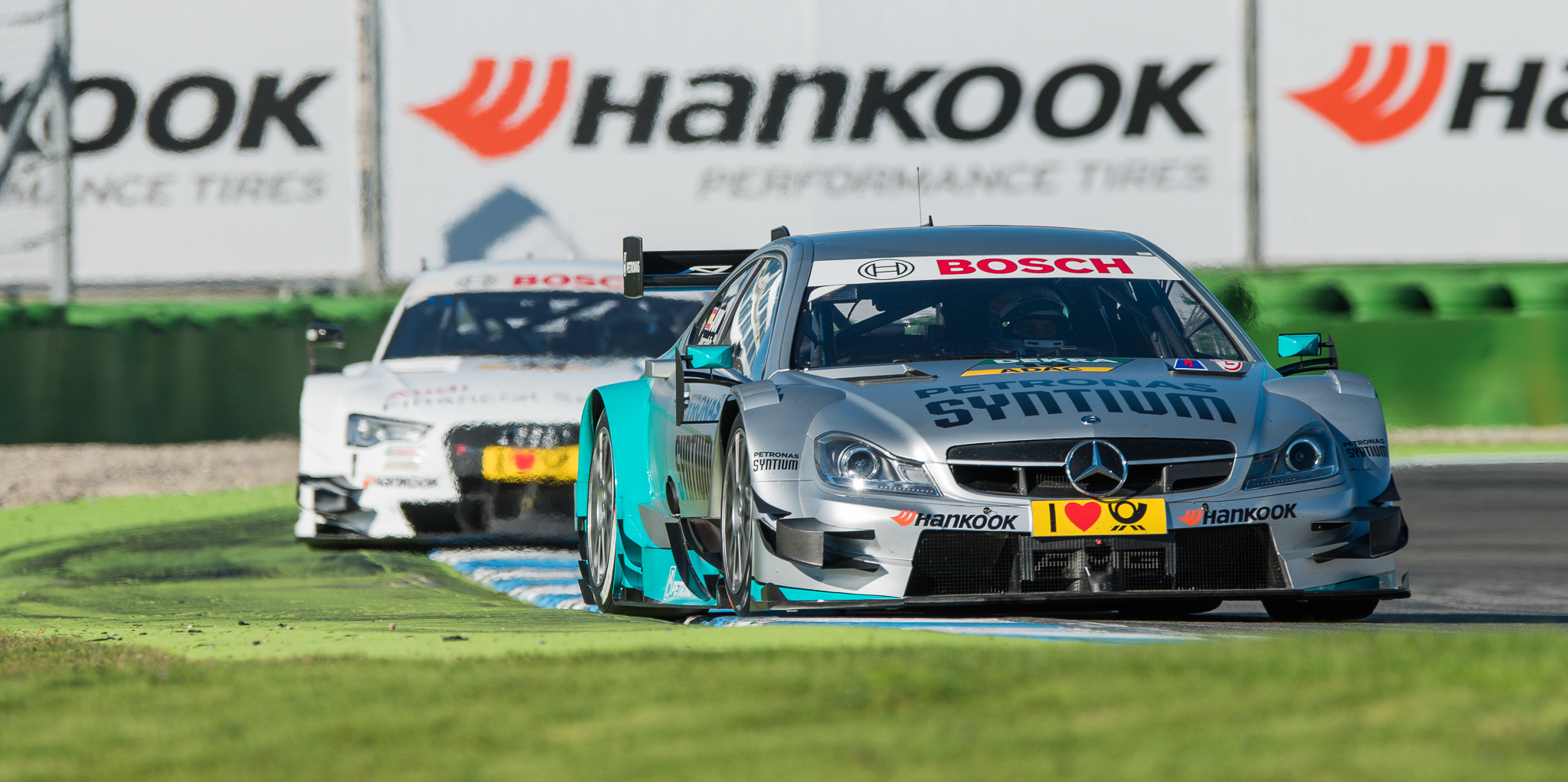
Juncadella for Mücke Motorsport in Deutsche Tourenwagen Masters 2014.

The team began running Mercedes in the Deutsche Tourenwagen Masters in 2005 with Stefan Mücke and Alexandros Margaritis as drivers. Mücke remained with the team in 2006 and was joined by Daniel la Rosa and Susie Stoddart. In 2007 Stefan Mücke left the team and was replaced by Mathias Lauda. La Rosa, Stoddart and Lauda left the team for 2008, and were replaced by Ralf Schumacher and Maro Engel. Lauda returned to partner Engel in 2009.

== Former series results ==
=== Deutsche Tourenwagen Masters ===
Year	Car	Drivers	Races	Wins	Poles	F/Laps	Points	D.C.	T.C.
2005	AMG-Mercedes C-Klasse 2004	(Germany) Stefan Mücke	11	0	0	0	3	18th	10th
2005	AMG-Mercedes C-Klasse 2004	(Greece) Alexandros Margaritis	11	0	0	0	0	19th	10th
2006	AMG-Mercedes C-Klasse 2005	(Germany) Stefan Mücke	10	0	0	0	7	12th	7th
2006	AMG-Mercedes C-Klasse 2005	(Germany) Daniel la Rosa	10	0	0	0	2	15th	7th
2006	AMG-Mercedes C-Klasse 2004	(United Kingdom) Susie Stoddart	10	0	0	0	0	17th	9th (Note: Shared team entry with Persson Motorsport)
2007	AMG-Mercedes C-Klasse 2006	(United Kingdom) Susie Stoddart	10	0	0	0	0	20th	6th
2007	AMG-Mercedes C-Klasse 2006	(Germany) Daniel la Rosa	10	0	0	0	10	13th	8th
2007	AMG-Mercedes C-Klasse 2005	(Austria) Mathias Lauda	10	0	0	0	4	15th	8th
2008	AMG-Mercedes C-Klasse 2007	(Germany) Ralf Schumacher	11	0	0	0	3	14th	8th
2008	AMG-Mercedes C-Klasse 2007	(Germany) Maro Engel	11	0	0	0	0	16th	8th
2009	AMG-Mercedes C-Klasse 2008	(Germany) Maro Engel	10	0	0	0	8	12th	8th
2009	AMG-Mercedes C-Klasse 2008	(Austria) Mathias Lauda	10	0	0	0	1	15th	8th
2010	AMG-Mercedes C-Klasse 2008	(Germany) Maro Engel	11	0	0	0	3	15th	8th
2010	AMG-Mercedes C-Klasse 2008	(United Kingdom) David Coulthard	11	0	0	1	1	16th	8th
2011	AMG-Mercedes C-Klasse 2008	(Germany) Maro Engel	10	0	0	0	5	13th	8th
2011	AMG-Mercedes C-Klasse 2008	(United Kingdom) David Coulthard	10	0	0	1	1	16th	8th
2012	DTM AMG Mercedes C-Coupé	(United Kingdom) David Coulthard	10	0	0	0	14	15th	10th
2012	DTM AMG Mercedes C-Coupé	(Canada) Robert Wickens	10	0	0	0	14	16th	10th
2013	DTM AMG Mercedes C-Coupé	(Spain) Daniel Juncadella	10	0	0	0	21	16th	9th
2013	DTM AMG Mercedes C-Coupé	(Germany) Pascal Wehrlein	10	0	0	1	3	22nd	9th
2014	DTM AMG Mercedes C-Coupé	(Spain) Daniel Juncadella	10	0	0	0	22	18th	12th
2014	DTM AMG Mercedes C-Coupé	(Russia) Vitaly Petrov	10	0	0	0	0	23rd	12th
2015	Mercedes-AMG C63 DTM	(Spain) Daniel Juncadella	18	0	0	0	26	20th	12th
2015	Mercedes-AMG C63 DTM	(Germany) Maximilian Götz	18	0	0	0	25	22nd	12th
2016	Mercedes-AMG C63 DTM	(Germany) Christian Vietoris	18	0	1	0	60	14th	8th
2016	Mercedes-AMG C63 DTM	(Austria) Lucas Auer	18	1	2	1	68	12th	8th
2021	Mercedes-AMG GT3 Evo	(Germany) Maximilian Buhk	14	0	0	0	28	15th	11th
2021	Mercedes-AMG GT3 Evo	(Germany) Marvin Dienst	2	0	0	0	6	19th	11th
2022	Mercedes-AMG GT3 Evo	(Germany) Maximilian Buhk	16	0	0	0	1	25th	16th

=== DTM Trophy ===
Year	Car	Drivers	Races	Wins	Poles	F/Laps	Points	D.C.	T.C.
2022	Mercedes-AMG GT4	(Mozambique) Rodrigo Almeida	14	1	0	0	111	5th	**3rd**
2022	Mercedes-AMG GT4	(France) Edouard Cauhaupé	14	0	1	1	102	6th	**3rd**

=== Italian F4 Championship ===
Year	Car	Drivers	Races	Wins	Poles	Fast laps	Points	D.C.	T.C.
2015	Tatuus F4-T014	(Russia) Robert Shwartzman	21	3	4	3	212	**3rd**	**2nd**
2015	Tatuus F4-T014	(Germany) David Beckmann	18	3	1	4	176	4th	**2nd**
2015	Tatuus F4-T014	(United Kingdom) Lando Norris	9	0	0	3	51	11th	**2nd**
2015	Tatuus F4-T014	(Austria) Thomas Preining	3	0	0	0	0	29th	**2nd**
2015	Tatuus F4-T014	(Germany) Mike Ortmann	6	0	0	0	16	20th	**2nd**
2015	Tatuus F4-T014	(Russia) Yan Leon Shlom	18	0	0	0	7	23rd	**2nd**
2016	Tatuus F4-T014	(China) Yifei Ye	13	0	0	2	67	11th	**3rd**
2016	Tatuus F4-T014	(Canada) Devlin DeFrancesco	14	0	0	0	31	19th	**3rd**
2016	Tatuus F4-T014	(Venezuela) Mauricio Baiz	12	2	2	0	85	9th	**3rd**
2016	Tatuus F4-T014	(Switzerland) Ricardo Feller	3	0	0	0	0	44th	**3rd**
2016	Tatuus F4-T014	(Italy) Aldo Festante	16	0	0	0	1	31st	**3rd**
2016	Tatuus F4-T014	(Venezuela) Sebastián Fernández	3	1	2	1	55	15th	**3rd**
2017	Tatuus F4-T014	(Germany) Sophia Flörsch	9	0	0	0	28	14th	5th
2017	Tatuus F4-T014	(Germany) Lirim Zendeli	12	0	0	0	57	9th	5th
2017	Tatuus F4-T014	(Sweden) Oliver Söderström	3	0	0	0	0	26th	5th
2017	Tatuus F4-T014	(United Kingdom) Olli Caldwell	6	0	0	0	0	23rd	5th
2018	Tatuus F4-T014	(Germany) Niklas Krütten	21	0	0	0	43	13th	4th
2018	Tatuus F4-T014	(Israel) Ido Cohen	21	0	0	0	0	30th	4th
2018	Tatuus F4-T014	(Finland) William Alatalo	21	1	0	0	105	8th	4th
2018	Tatuus F4-T014	(Belgium) Amaury Cordeel	6	0	0	0	0	NC	4th
2019	Tatuus F4-T014	(Germany) Nico Göhler	6	0	0	0	0	33rd	**3rd**
2019	Tatuus F4-T014	(Finland) William Alatalo	21	0	0	2	118	9th	**3rd**
2019	Tatuus F4-T014	(Paraguay) Joshua Dürksen	21	1	0	0	122	8th	**3rd**
2019	Tatuus F4-T014	(Italy) Erwin Zanotti	21	0	0	0	0	34th	**3rd**
2020	Tatuus F4-T014	(Germany) Joshua Dürksen	8	1	1	2	60	13th	8th
2020	Tatuus F4-T014	(Hungary) Bence Válint	20*	0	0	0	8	21st	8th
2020	Tatuus F4-T014	(Czech Republic) Josef Knopp	3	0	0	0	0	32nd	8th
2020	Tatuus F4-T014	(Colombia) Diego Contecha	5	0	0	0	0	41st	8th
2021	Tatuus F4-T014	(Paraguay) Joshua Dürksen	21	2	0	2	171	6th	4th
2021	Tatuus F4-T014	(Mexico) Erick Zuniga	21	0	0	0	22	18th	4th
2021	Tatuus F4-T014	(Germany) Jonas Ried	21	0	0	1	13	25th	4th

*He only drove for Mücke Motorsport in 3 of the 20 races.

=== ADAC Formula 4 ===
Year	Car	Drivers	Races	Wins	Poles	Fast laps	Points	D.C.	T.C.
2015	Tatuus F4-T014	(Germany) Benjamin Mazatis	21	0	0	0	0	46th	N/A
2015	Tatuus F4-T014	(Russia) Robert Shwartzman	18	0	0	4	167	4th	N/A
2015	Tatuus F4-T014	(Germany) David Beckmann	18	1	0	0	166	5th	N/A
2015	Tatuus F4-T014	(Germany) Mike Ortmann	21	0	0	0	78	12th	N/A
2015	Tatuus F4-T014	(Austria) Thomas Preining	6	0	0	0	16	21st	N/A
2015	Tatuus F4-T014	(Russia) Yan Leon Shlom	15	0	0	0	2	27th	N/A
2015	Tatuus F4-T014	(United Kingdom) Lando Norris	8	1	0	3	131	8th	N/A
2016	Tatuus F4-T014	(Venezuela) Mauricio Baiz	3	0	0	0	1	30th	**3rd**
2016	Tatuus F4-T014	(Germany) Lirim Zendeli	24	0	0	1	74	13th	**3rd**
2016	Tatuus F4-T014	(Germany) Mike Ortmann	24	3	2	2	247	**3rd**	**3rd**
2016	Tatuus F4-T014	(Sweden) Oliver Söderström	21	0	0	0	1	28th	**3rd**
2016	Tatuus F4-T014	(Switzerland) Ricardo Feller	15	0	0	0	0	39th	**3rd**
2016	Tatuus F4-T014	(Canada) Devlin DeFrancesco	3	0	0	0	0	38th	**3rd**
2017	Tatuus F4-T014	(Czech Republic) Tom Beckhäuser	21	0	0	0	0	26th	**3rd**
2017	Tatuus F4-T014	(Germany) Sophia Flörsch	21	0	0	2	71	13th	**3rd**
2017	Tatuus F4-T014	(Sweden) Oliver Söderström	21	0	0	0	27	18th	**3rd**
2017	Tatuus F4-T014	(Germany) Lirim Zendeli	21	3	3	1	164	4th	**3rd**
2017	Tatuus F4-T014	(United Kingdom) Olli Caldwell	6	0	0	0	0	NC	**3rd**
2018	Tatuus F4-T014	(Germany) Niklas Krütten	20	1	0	0	108	8th	4th
2018	Tatuus F4-T014	(Israel) Ido Cohen	17	0	0	0	7	19th	4th
2018	Tatuus F4-T014	(Germany) Leon Köhler	20	0	0	0	33	13th	4th
2018	Tatuus F4-T014	(Belgium) Amaury Cordeel	5	0	0	0	0	NC	4th
2019	Tatuus F4-T014	(Germany) Nico Göhler	20	0	0	0	9	18th	5th
2019	Tatuus F4-T014	(Paraguay) Joshua Dürksen	20	0	0	0	80	11th	5th
2019	Tatuus F4-T014	(Austria) Nico Gruber	3	0	0	0	0	21st	5th
2020	Tatuus F4-T014	(Czech Republic) Josef Knopp	21	0	0	0	32	12th	4th
2020	Tatuus F4-T014	(Mexico) Erick Zuniga	15	0	0	0	19	15th	4th
2020	Tatuus F4-T014	(Germany) Joshua Dürksen	21	2	1	1	191	6th	4th

=== Formula 4 UAE Championship ===
Year	Car	Drivers	Races	Wins	Poles	Fast laps	Points	D.C.	T.C.
2018	Tatuus F4-T014	(Germany) Niklas Krütten	8	0	0	1	64	11th	5th
2018	Tatuus F4-T014	(Finland) William Alatalo	8	2	0	0	104	9th	5th
2019	Tatuus F4-T014	(Germany) Niklas Krütten	4	1	0	1	0	NC	**3rd**
2019	Tatuus F4-T014	(United Arab Emirates) Nico Göhler	20	0	0	0	133	6th	**3rd**
2019	Tatuus F4-T014	(Paraguay) Joshua Dürksen	20	5	2	4	295	**2nd**	**3rd**
2020	Tatuus F4-T014	(Germany) Nico Göhler	19	4	0	1	270	**3rd**	**2nd**
2020	Tatuus F4-T014	(Italy) Erwin Zanotti	4	0	0	0	13	14th	**2nd**
2020	Tatuus F4-T014	(Czech Republic) Josef Knopp	12	0	0	1	65	9th	**2nd**
2020	Tatuus F4-T014	(Russia) Artem Lobanenko	4	0	0	2	29	13th	**2nd**
2020	Tatuus F4-T014	(Mexico) Erick Zuniga	19	1	0	0	143	6th	**2nd**
2021	Tatuus F4-T014	(Italy) Francesco Braschi	8	0	0	1	77	8th	4th
2021	Tatuus F4-T014	(Russia) Vladislav Lomko	4	2	1	0	66	12th	4th
2021	Tatuus F4-T014	(Germany) Jonas Ried	20	0	0	0	77	9th	4th

=== GP3 Series ===
Year	Car	Drivers	Races	Wins	Poles	Fast laps	Points	D.C.	T.C.
2010	Dallara GP3/10-Renault	(Netherlands) Nigel Melker	16	0	2	0	5	23rd	10th
2010	Dallara GP3/10-Renault	(Netherlands) Renger van der Zande	16	0	0	0	6	21st	10th
2010	Dallara GP3/10-Renault	(Germany) Tobias Hegewald	16	0	0	0	6	22nd	10th
2011	Dallara GP3/10-Renault	(United Kingdom) Luciano Bacheta	12	0	0	0	4	22nd	4th
2011	Dallara GP3/10-Renault	(Denmark) Michael Christensen	16	0	0	1	19	11th	4th
2011	Dallara GP3/10-Renault	(Netherlands) Nigel Melker	16	1	0	2	38	**3rd**	4th
2011	Dallara GP3/10-Renault	(Italy) Daniel Mancinelli	4	0	0	0	0	35th	4th

=== In detail ===
(key) (Races in bold indicate pole position) (Races in italics indicate fastest lap)

Year	Chassis Engine Tyres	Drivers	1	2	3	4	5	6	7	8	9	10	11	12	13	14	15	16	T.C.	Points
2010	GP3/10; Renault; **P**		CAT; FEA	CAT; SPR	IST; FEA	IST; SPR	VAL; FEA	VAL; SPR	SIL; FEA	SIL; SPR	HOC; FEA	HOC; SPR	HUN; FEA	HUN; SPR	SPA; FEA	SPA; SPR	MNZ; FEA	MNZ; SPR	10th	17
2010	GP3/10; Renault; **P**	(Netherlands) Nigel Melker	**Ret**	14	**23**	17	Ret	15	12	Ret	Ret	Ret	23	14	12	15	8	13	10th	17
2010	GP3/10; Renault; **P**	(Netherlands) Renger van der Zande	15	24	Ret	Ret	Ret	24	11	7	3	Ret	9	Ret	Ret	Ret	Ret	Ret	10th	17
2010	GP3/10; Renault; **P**	(Germany) Tobias Hegewald	17	13	16	15	9	29†	4	6	Ret	Ret	15	Ret	11	8	10	11	10th	17
2011	GP3/10; Renault; **P**		IST; FEA	IST; SPR	CAT; FEA	CAT; SPR	VAL; FEA	VAL; SPR	SIL; FEA	SIL; SPR	NÜR; FEA	NÜR; SPR	HUN; FEA	HUN; SPR	SPA; FEA	SPA; SPR	MNZ; FEA	MNZ; SPR	4th	61
2011	GP3/10; Renault; **P**	(United Kingdom) Luciano Bacheta	Ret	19	22	16	18	10	5	19	25	25	17	Ret					4th	61
2011	GP3/10; Renault; **P**	(Italy) Daniel Mancinelli													Ret	17	15	15	4th	61
2011	GP3/10; Renault; **P**	(Denmark) Michael Christensen	7	2	18	12	Ret	Ret	Ret	13	26†	12	2	13	15	4	12	11	4th	61
2011	GP3/10; Renault; **P**	(Netherlands) Nigel Melker	1	3	6	2	Ret	19	Ret	8	10	3	8	4	3	Ret	9	Ret	4th	61

=== FIA Formula 3 European Championship ===
Year	Car	Drivers	Races	Wins	Poles	Fast laps	Points	D.C.	T.C.
2012	Dallara F312-Mercedes-Benz	(Sweden) Felix Rosenqvist	20	4	3	3	192	**3rd**	**2nd**
2012	Dallara F312-Mercedes-Benz	(Germany) Pascal Wehrlein	20	1	1	0	179	4th	**2nd**
2013	Dallara F312-Mercedes	(Germany) Pascal Wehrlein	3	1	2	2	49	14th	**2nd**
2013	Dallara F312-Mercedes	(United States) Michael Lewis	27	0	0	0	23	19th	**2nd**
2013	Dallara F312-Mercedes	(Sweden) Felix Rosenqvist	30	10	4	10	457	**2nd**	**2nd**
2013	Dallara F312-Mercedes	(Australia) Mitchell Gilbert	30	0	0	0	10	23rd	**2nd**
2013	Dallara F312-Mercedes	(Israel) Roy Nissany	30	0	0	0	11	22nd	**2nd**
2014	Dallara F312-Mercedes	(Austria) Lucas Auer	33	3	1	2	365	4th	**3rd**
2014	Dallara F312-Mercedes	(Israel) Roy Nissany	33	0	0	0	26	17th	**3rd**
2014	Dallara F312-Mercedes	(Sweden) Felix Rosenqvist	33	1	1	3	198	8th	**3rd**
2015	Dallara F312-Mercedes	(United States) Santino Ferrucci	33	0	0	1	91	11th	5th
2015	Dallara F312-Mercedes	(Italy) Michele Beretta	33	0	0	0	4	22nd	5th
2015	Dallara F312-Mercedes	(Denmark) Mikkel Jensen	33	0	1	0	117.5	9th	5th
2015	Dallara F312-Mercedes	(Germany) Maximilian Günther	27	1	0	0	152	8th	5th
2015	Dallara F312-Mercedes	(China) Kang Ling	24	0	0	0	0	38th	5th
2015	Dallara F312-Mercedes	(Puerto Rico) Félix Serrallés	3	0	0	0	0	33rd	5th
2016	Dallara F316-Mercedes	(Denmark) Mikkel Jensen	30	0	0	0	107	12th	5th
2016	Dallara F316-Mercedes	(Germany) David Beckmann	24	0	0	0	67	15th	5th

D.C. = Drivers' Championship position, T.C. = Teams' Championship position.

=== ADAC Formel Masters ===
Year	Car	Drivers	Races	Wins	Poles	Fast laps	Points	D.C.	T.C.
2008	Dallara Formulino (Volkswagen 1.6 FSi)	(Austria) Willi Steindl	16	2	1	2	55	11th	4th
2008	Dallara Formulino (Volkswagen 1.6 FSi)	(Germany) Philip Wulbusch	16	0	0	0	107	6th	4th
2009	Dallara Formulino (Volkswagen 1.6 FSi)	(Germany) Philip Wulbusch	10	0	0	0	14	16th	9th
2009	Dallara Formulino (Volkswagen 1.6 FSi)	(Switzerland) Riccardo Galli	2	0	0	0	0	25th	9th
2009	Dallara Formulino (Volkswagen 1.6 FSi)	(Brazil) Pedro Bianchini	2	0	0	0	0	27th	9th
2010	Dallara Formulino (Volkswagen 1.6 FSi)	(Germany) Pascal Wehrlein	21	1	1	1	147	6th	4th
2010	Dallara Formulino (Volkswagen 1.6 FSi)	(Switzerland) Andrina Gugger	21	0	0	0	23	15th	4th
2011	Dallara Formulino (Volkswagen 1.6 FSi)	(Germany) Jason Kremer	24	1	0	0	132	7th	4th
2011	Dallara Formulino (Volkswagen 1.6 FSi)	(Germany) Philip Wulbusch	24	0	0	0	81	11th	4th
2012	Dallara Formulino (Volkswagen)	(Israel) Roy Nissany	24	1	0	0	98	9th	**2nd**
2012	Dallara Formulino (Volkswagen)	(Germany) Florian Herzog	24	0	1	1	37	14th	**2nd**
2012	Dallara Formulino (Volkswagen)	(Germany) Luca Caspari	24	0	0	0	91	10th	**2nd**
2012	Dallara Formulino (Volkswagen)	(Germany) Jason Kremer	24	1	2	2	191	4th	**2nd**
2013	Dallara Formulino (Volkswagen)	(Germany) Maximilian Günther	24	2	2	8	98	**2nd**	**1st**
2013	Dallara Formulino (Volkswagen)	(Germany) Kim-Luis Schramm	24	0	0	0	24	14th	**1st**
2013	Dallara Formulino (Volkswagen)	(Germany) Hendrik Grapp	24	1	0	1	106	9th	**1st**
2013	Dallara Formulino (Volkswagen)	(Switzerland) Giorgio Maggi	24	0	0	0	0	20th	**1st**
2013	Dallara Formulino (Volkswagen)	(Belgium) Alessio Picariello	24	12	5	6	388	**1st**	**1st**
2014	Dallara Formulino (Volkswagen)	(Germany) Maximilian Günther	24	4	5	4	262	**2nd**	**2nd**
2014	Dallara Formulino (Volkswagen)	(Germany) Kim-Luis Schramm	24	0	0	1	127	9th	**2nd**
2014	Dallara Formulino (Volkswagen)	(Germany) Marvin Dienst	24	3	2	3	205	4th	**2nd**
2014	Dallara Formulino (Volkswagen)	(Switzerland) Giorgio Maggi	24	0	0	0	10	15th	**2nd**
2014	Dallara Formulino (Volkswagen)	(Germany) Philip Hamprecht	18	0	0	0	60	11th	**2nd**

The team competed as ADAC Berlin-Brandenburg in 2010,2013-2014

== Timeline ==
Current series
ADAC GT4 Germany	2023–present
Prototype Cup Germany	2023–present
GT4 European Series	2023–present
GT4 Winter Series	2024–present
Former series
Formula BMW ADAC	1998–2007
German Formula Three Championship	1999–2002
Formula 3 Euro Series	2003–2012
Deutsche Tourenwagen Masters	2005–2016, 2021–2022
Formula BMW Europe	2008–2010
ADAC Formel Masters	2008-2014
British Formula 3 International Series	2010, 2012
GP3 Series	2010–2011
European Formula 3 Championship	2012–2016
ADAC Formula 4	2015–2020
Italian Formula 4 Championship	2015–2021
ADAC GT Masters	2017–2020
24H GT Series	2018–2019
Formula 4 UAE Championship	2018–2021
DTM Trophy	2022
