= Mercedes-Benz AMG C-Class DTM (W203) =

Mercedes-Benz AMG C-Class W203 DTM
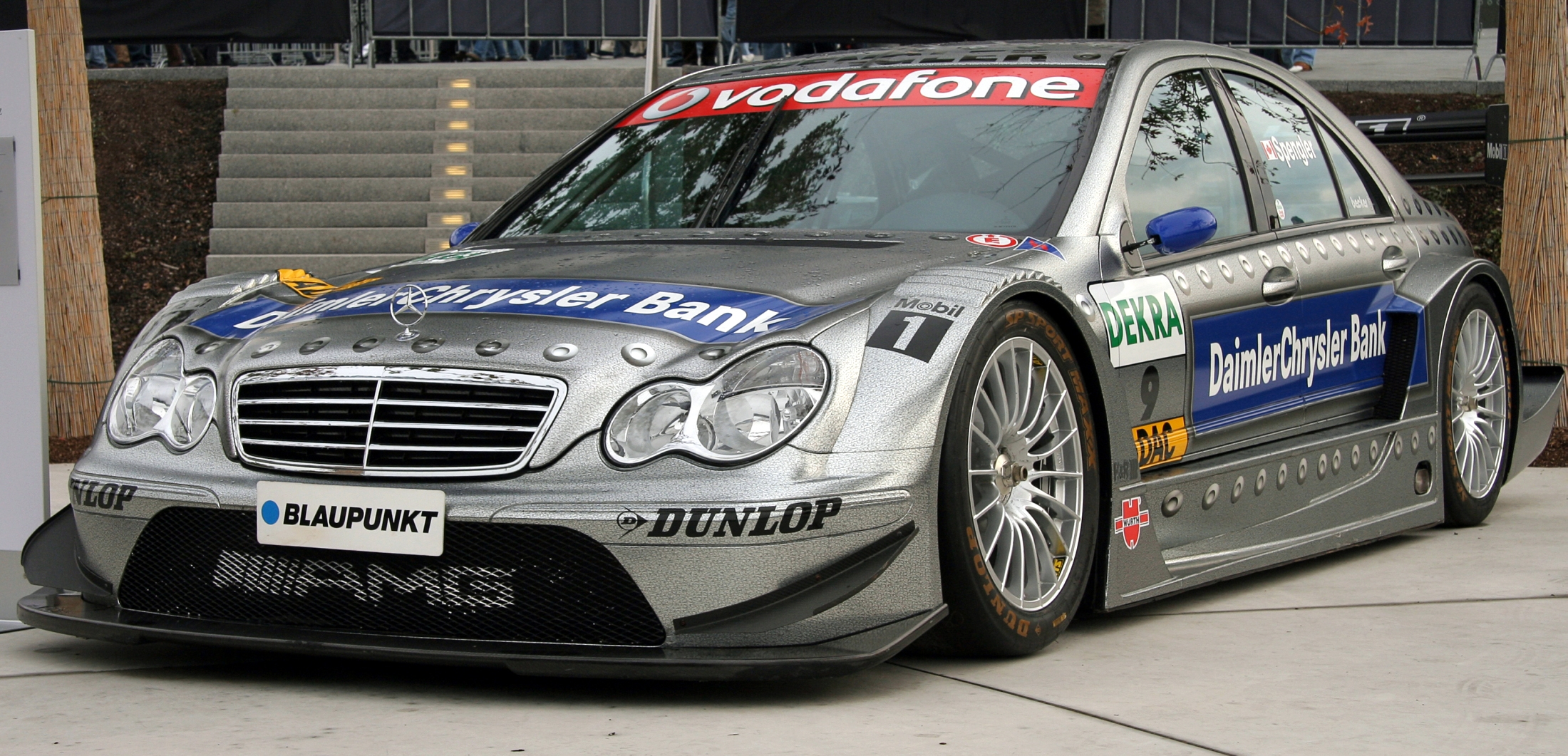
- Category: Deutsche Tourenwagen Masters (Touring Cars)
- Constructor: (Germany) Mercedes-Benz
- Predecessor: Mercedes-Benz CLK DTM
- Successor: Mercedes-Benz AMG C-Class W204 DTM

Technical specifications
- Chassis: Carbon-fibre composite monocoque
- Suspension (front): Double wishbones with H&R spring/damper units to front and rear axles, actuated via pushrods
- Suspension (rear): As front
- Length: 4,870 mm (192 in)
- Width: 1,845 mm (73 in)
- Height: 1,255 mm (49 in)
- Wheelbase: 2,795 mm (110 in)
- Engine: Mercedes-Benz 4.0 L (244 cu in) V8 90 degree naturally aspirated front engine
- Transmission: Xtrac 6-speed sequential manual sport gearbox
- Power: Approx. 460 hp (343 kW)
- Weight: 1,070 kg (2,359 lb) (including driver)
- Fuel: Aral Ultimate 100 RON
- Lubricants: Mobil 1
- Tyres: Dunlop SP Sport Maxx; Front: 265/660 - R18; Rear: 280/660 - R18; AVUS forged aluminium wheels Front: 12 x 18 inches Rear: 13 x 18 inches

Competition history
- Notable entrants: (Germany) HWA Team (Germany) Mücke Motorsport (Germany) Persson Motorsport
- Notable drivers: (Germany) Bernd Schneider (Netherlands) Christijan Albers (United Kingdom) Gary Paffett (France) Jean Alesi (Finland) Mika Häkkinen (Germany) Stefan Mücke (Greece) Alexandros Margaritis (Canada) Bruno Spengler (United Kingdom) Jamie Green (Austria) Mathias Lauda (Germany) Daniel La Rosa (United Kingdom) Susie Wolff (United Kingdom) Paul di Resta
- Debut: 2004 Hockenheimring DTM round
Races	Wins	Poles	F/Laps
33 (including non-championship race at Shanghai)	21	19	26
- Constructors' Championships: 2
- Drivers' Championships: 2

The Mercedes-Benz AMG C-Class W203 DTM is a DTM touring car constructed by the German car manufacturer Mercedes-Benz. It was the successor to the Mercedes-Benz CLK DTM which was permanently retired after the 2003 season, and based on the Mercedes-Benz C-Class W203 first generation car. Mercedes-Benz AMG C-Class W203 DTM made its first appearance on 3 February 2004 at the Circuit de Catalunya.

== Technical details ==
Like all racing cars in the DTM, the C-Class W203 DTM only looks like the eponymous series cars, constructed is the prototype of a CFK - monocoque chassis with an integrated 70 L; 18.5 US gal (15.4 imp gal) fuel tank. Since refuelling was still allowed in the race at this time, a 120 L; 31.7 US gal (26.4 imp gal) tank was not built. The C-Class W203 DTM is powered by a 4-litre Mercedes-Benz naturally-aspirated V8 engine, power output approximately 350 kW (469 hp) and torque more than 500 N⋅m (369 lb⋅ft). The rear-wheel drive C-Class DTM has a sequential 6-speed sports transmission, a 3-plate carbon fiber clutch supplied by Sandtler (2004-2006) and an adjustable multi-disc limited-slip differential.

== Gallery ==
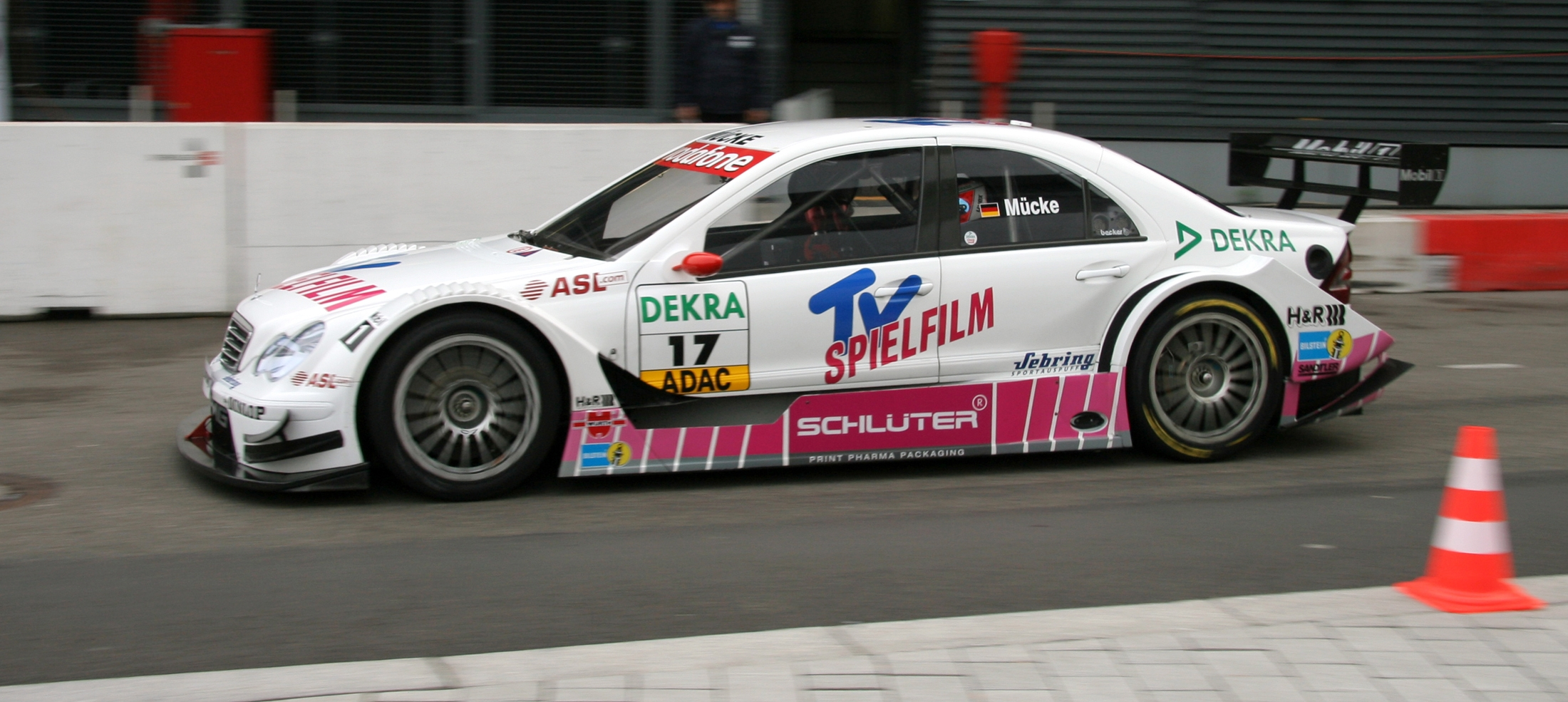
Stefan Mücke during 2006 Stars & Cars

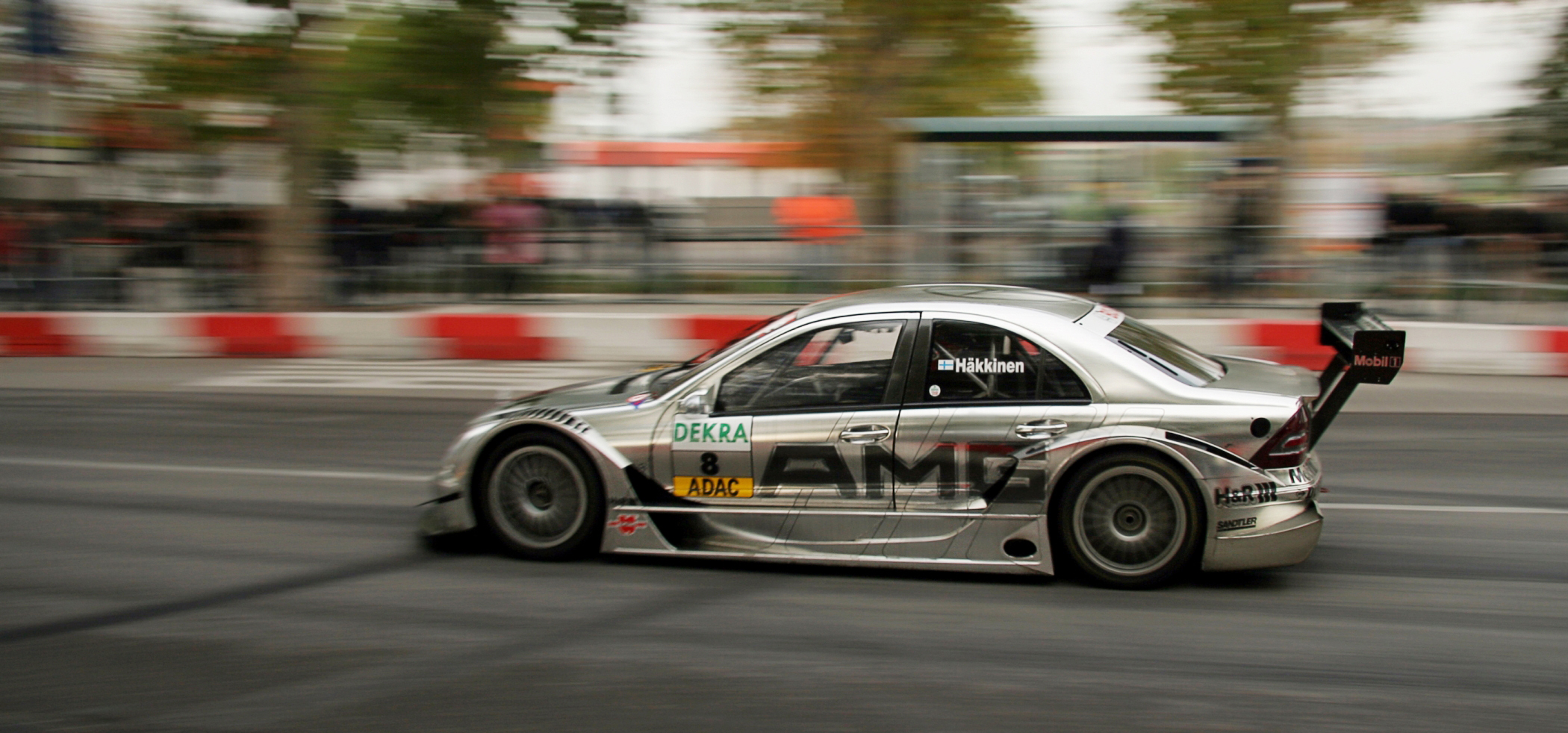
Mika Häkkinen demonstrates Mercedes-Benz AMG C-Class W203 DTM

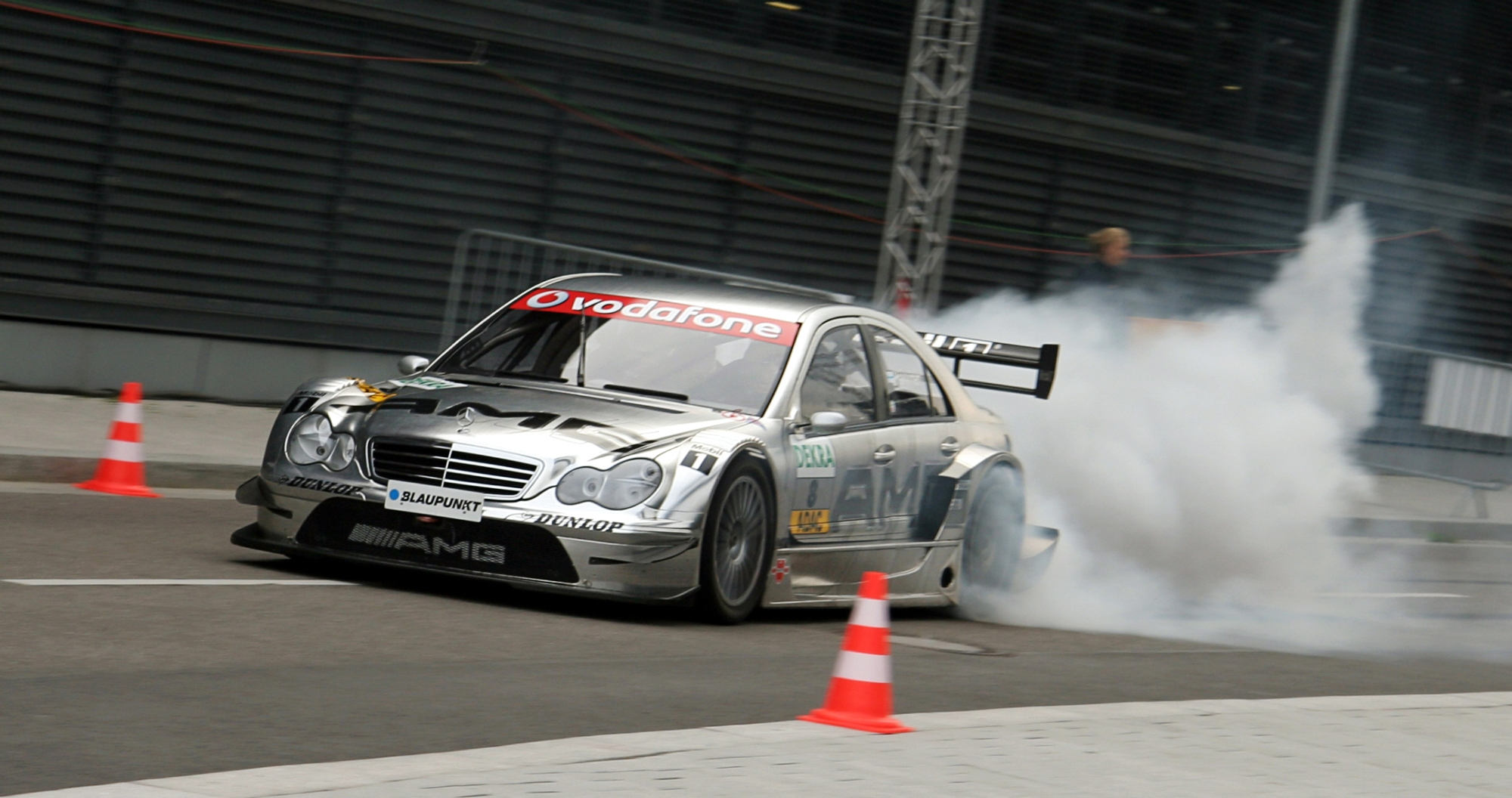
Mika Häkkinen burnouts Mercedes-Benz AMG C-Class W203 DTM during 2006 Stars & Cars

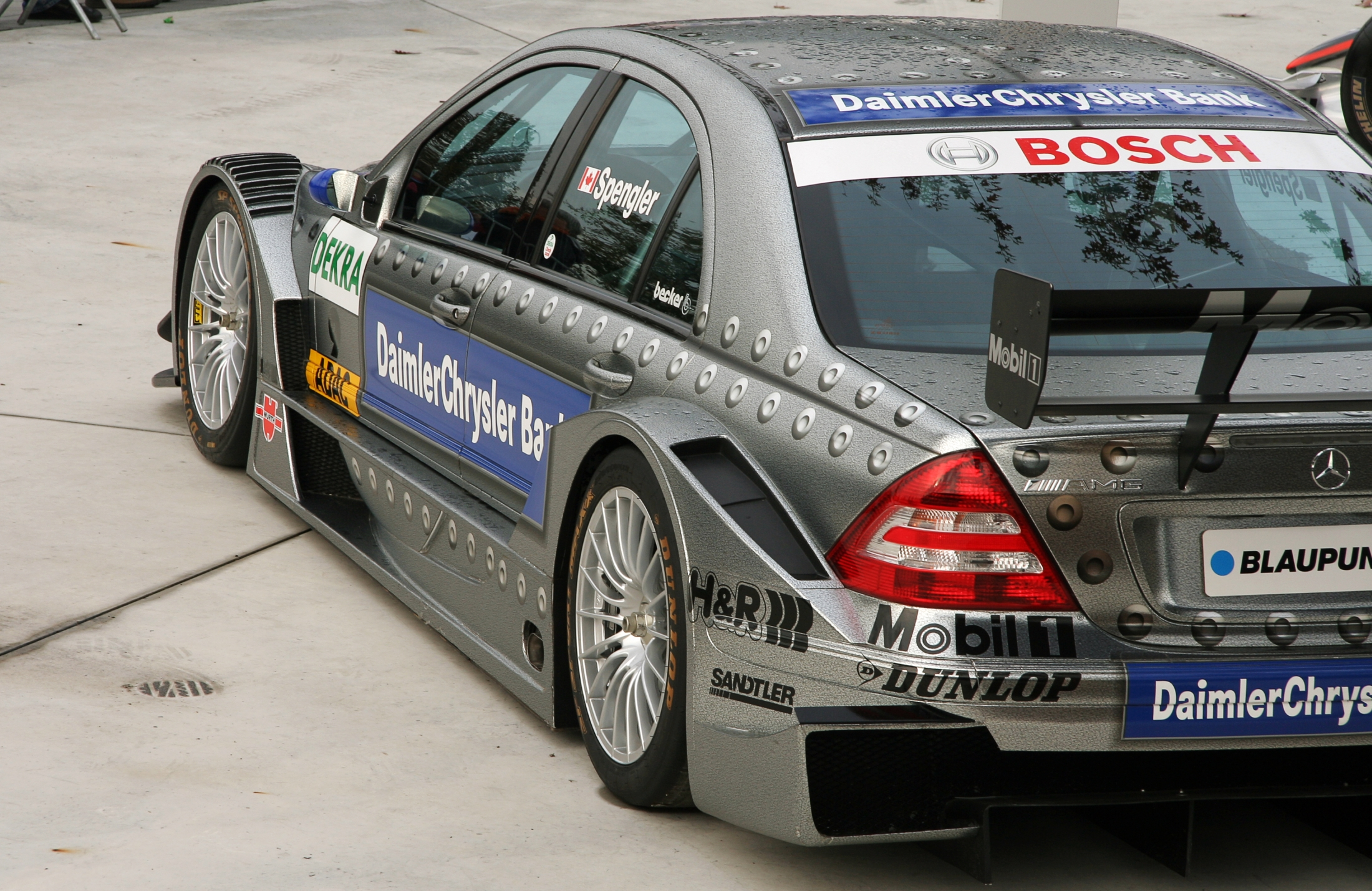
Left rear view of Mercedes-Benz AMG C-Class W203 DTM

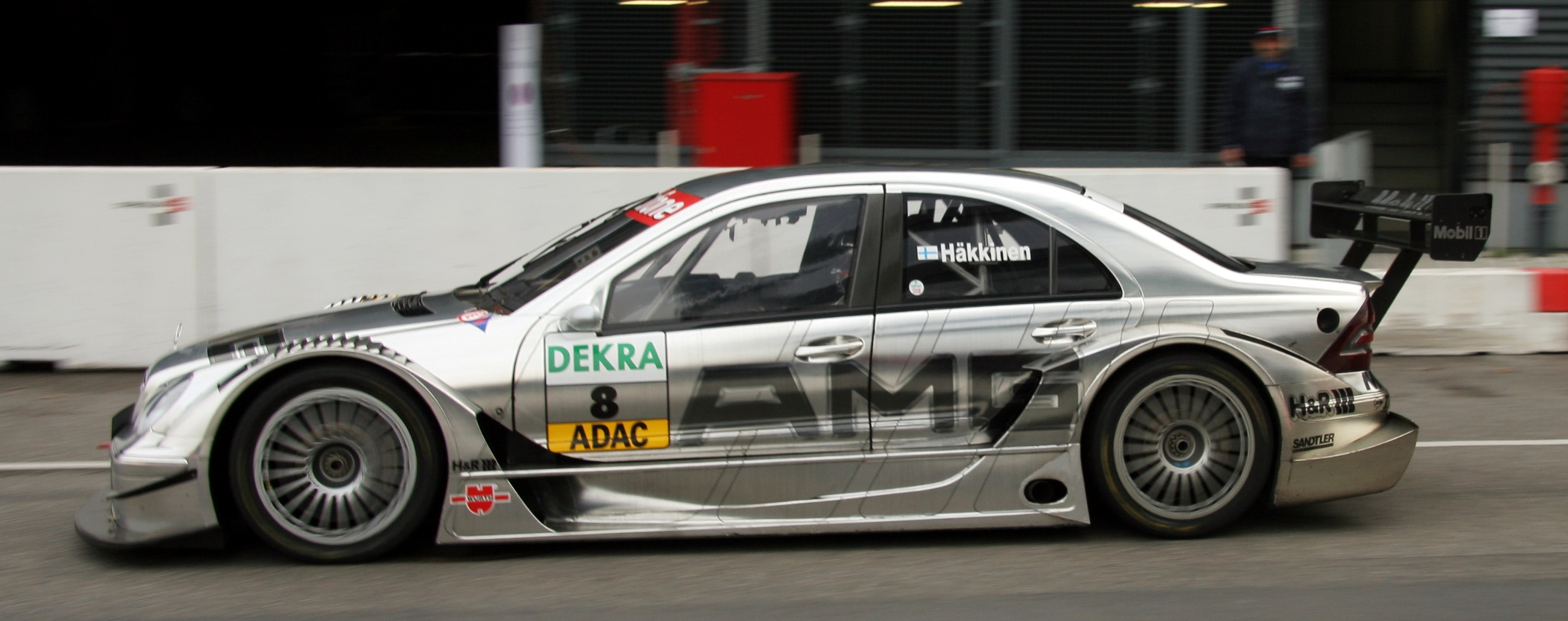
Mika Häkkinen during 2006 Stars & Cars

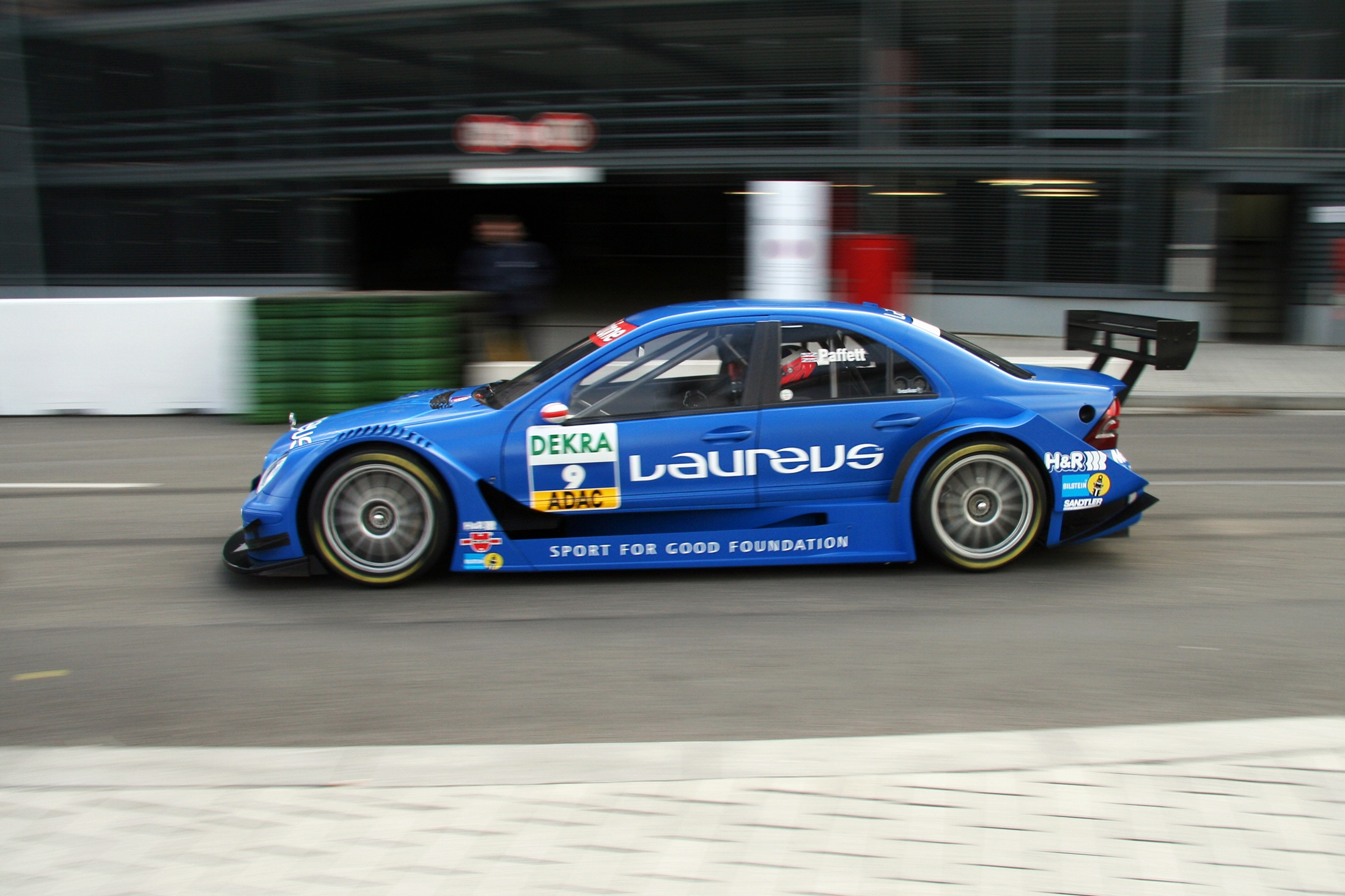
Gary Paffett during 2007 Stars & Cars

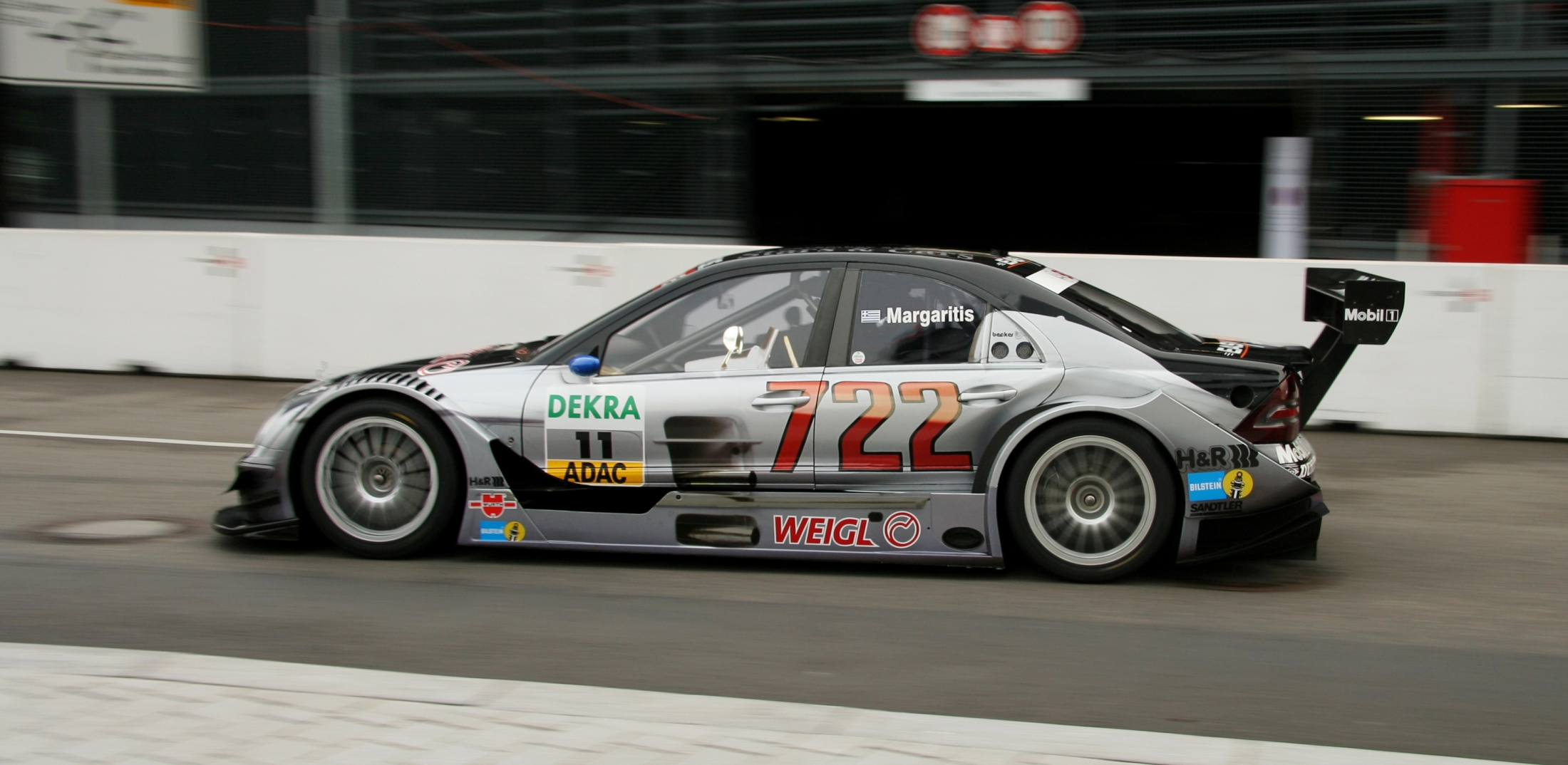
Alexandros Margaritis during 2006 Stars & Cars

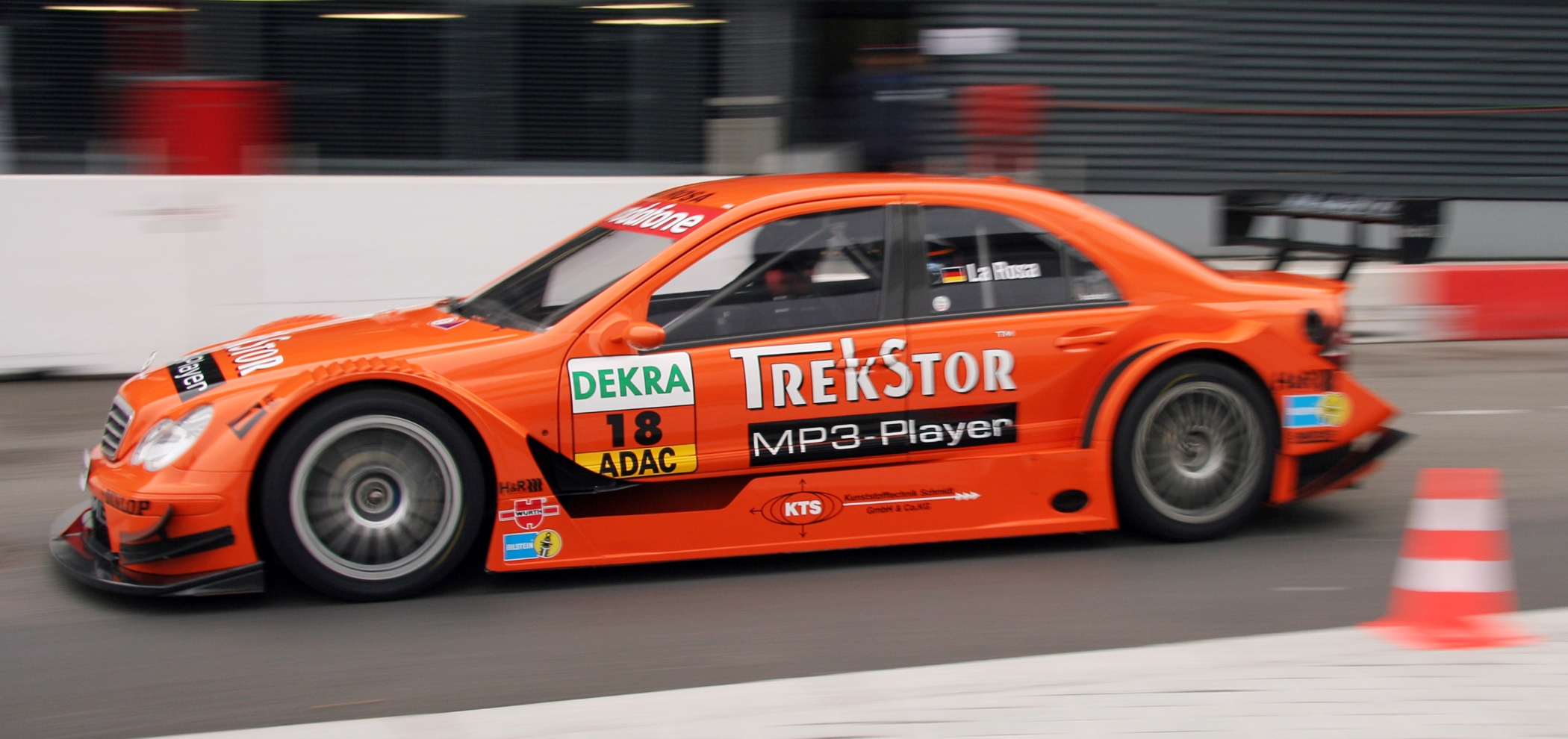
Daniel La Rosa during 2006 Stars & Cars

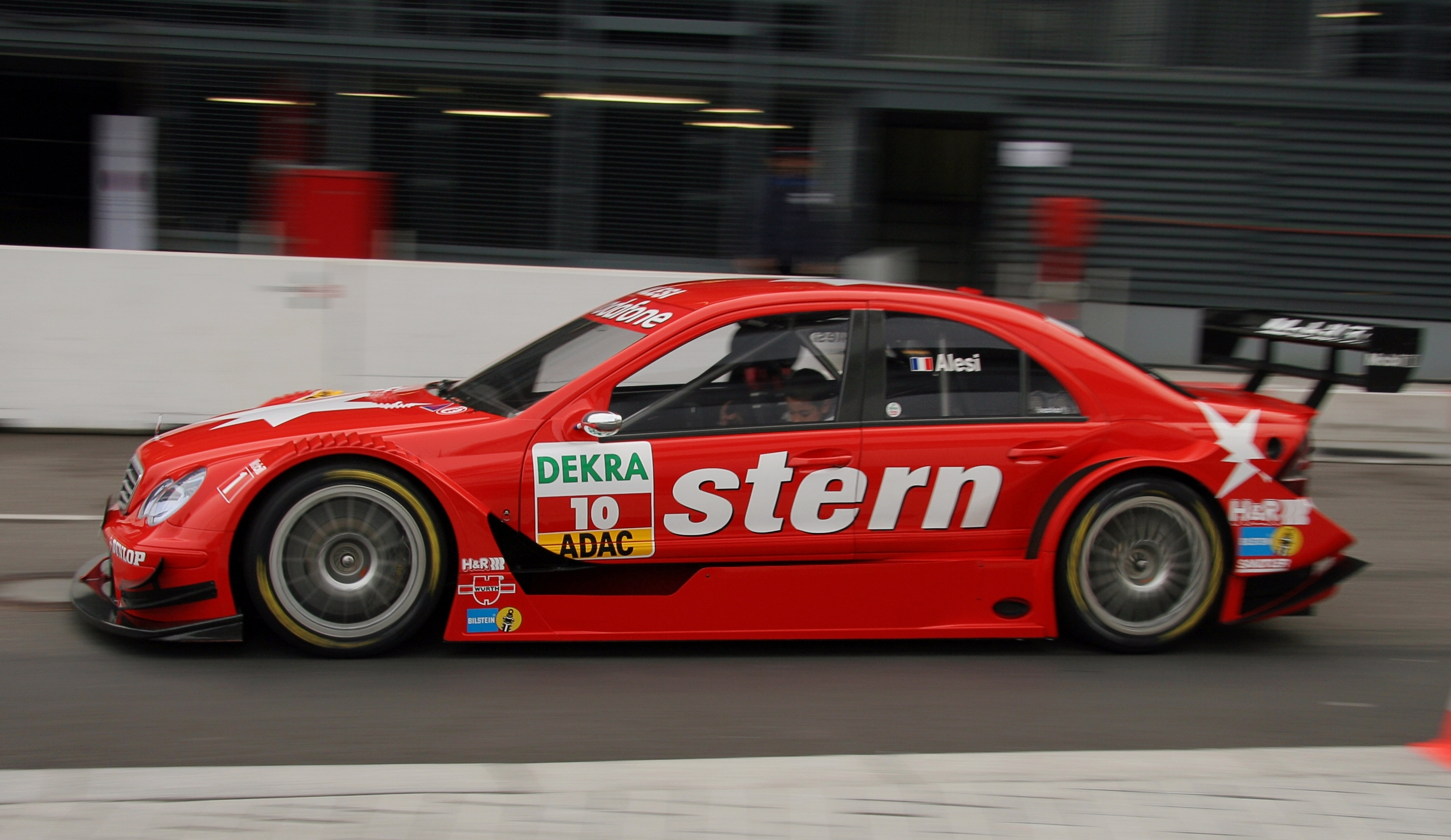
Jean Alesi during 2006 Stars & Cars

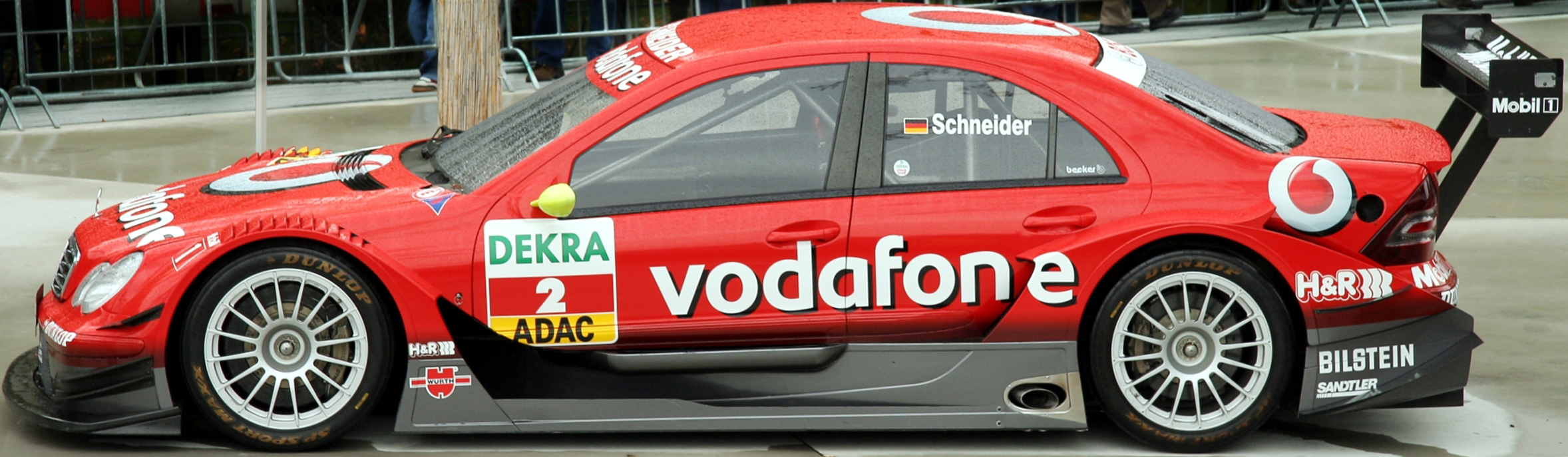
Bernd Schneider's Mercedes-Benz AMG C-Class W203 DTM displayed during 2006 Stars & Cars
