= Mercedes-AMG C-Coupé DTM =

DTM Mercedes-AMG C-Coupé Mercedes-AMG C63 DTM
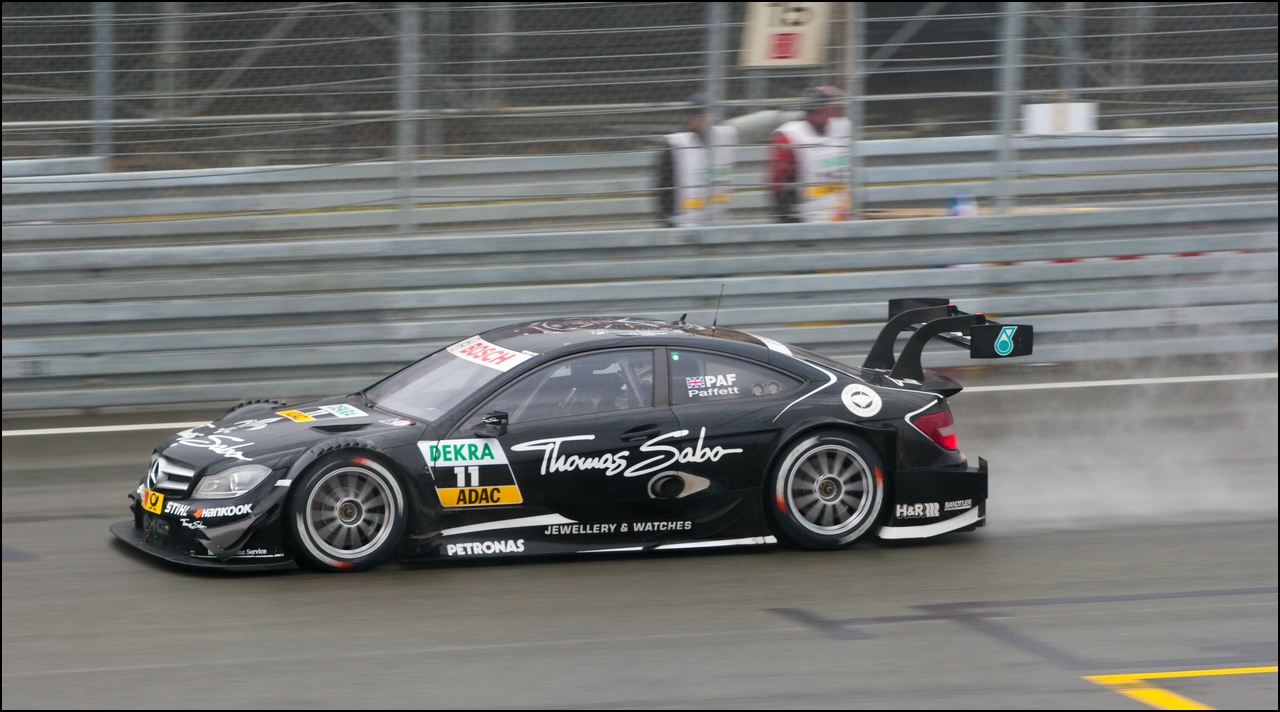
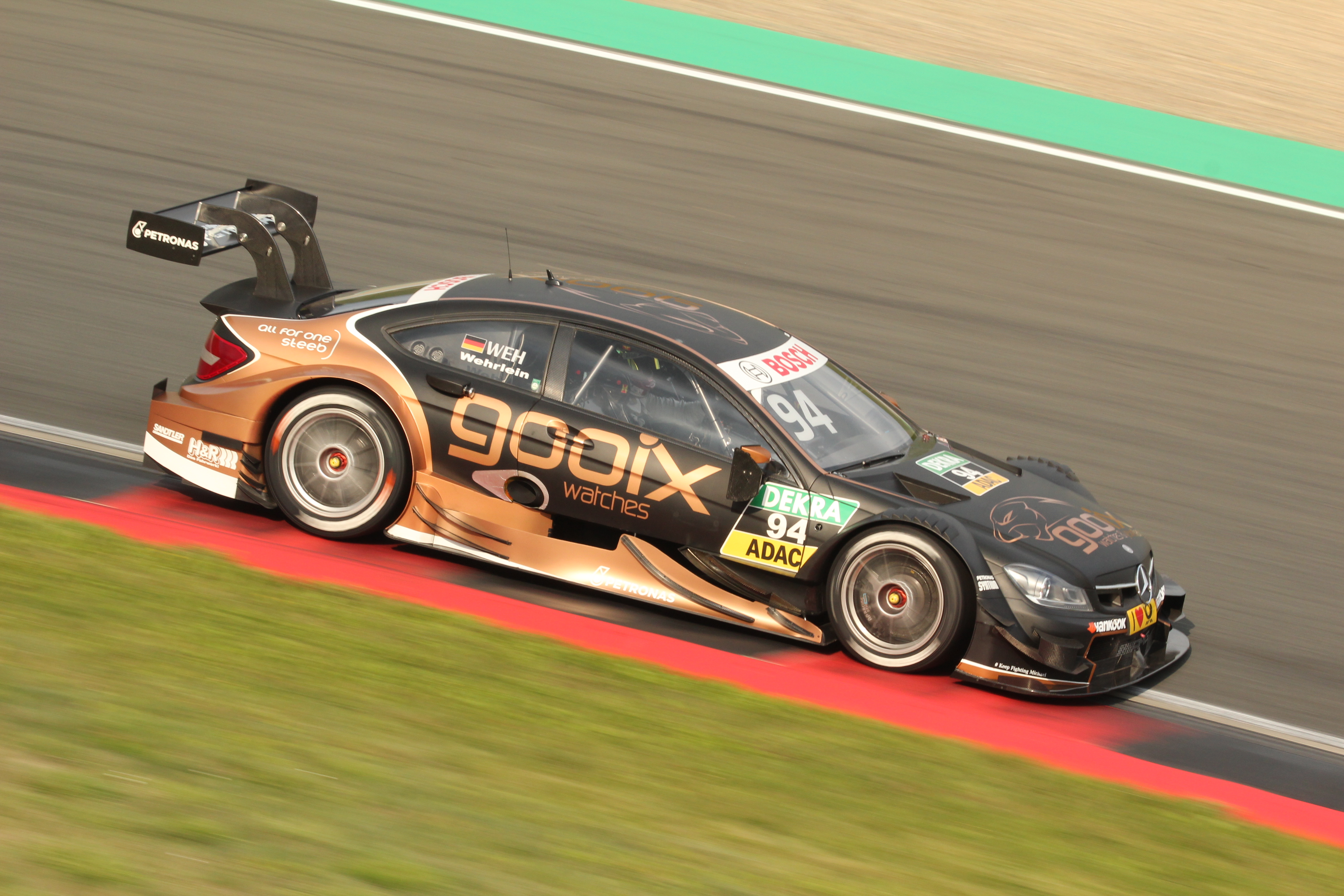
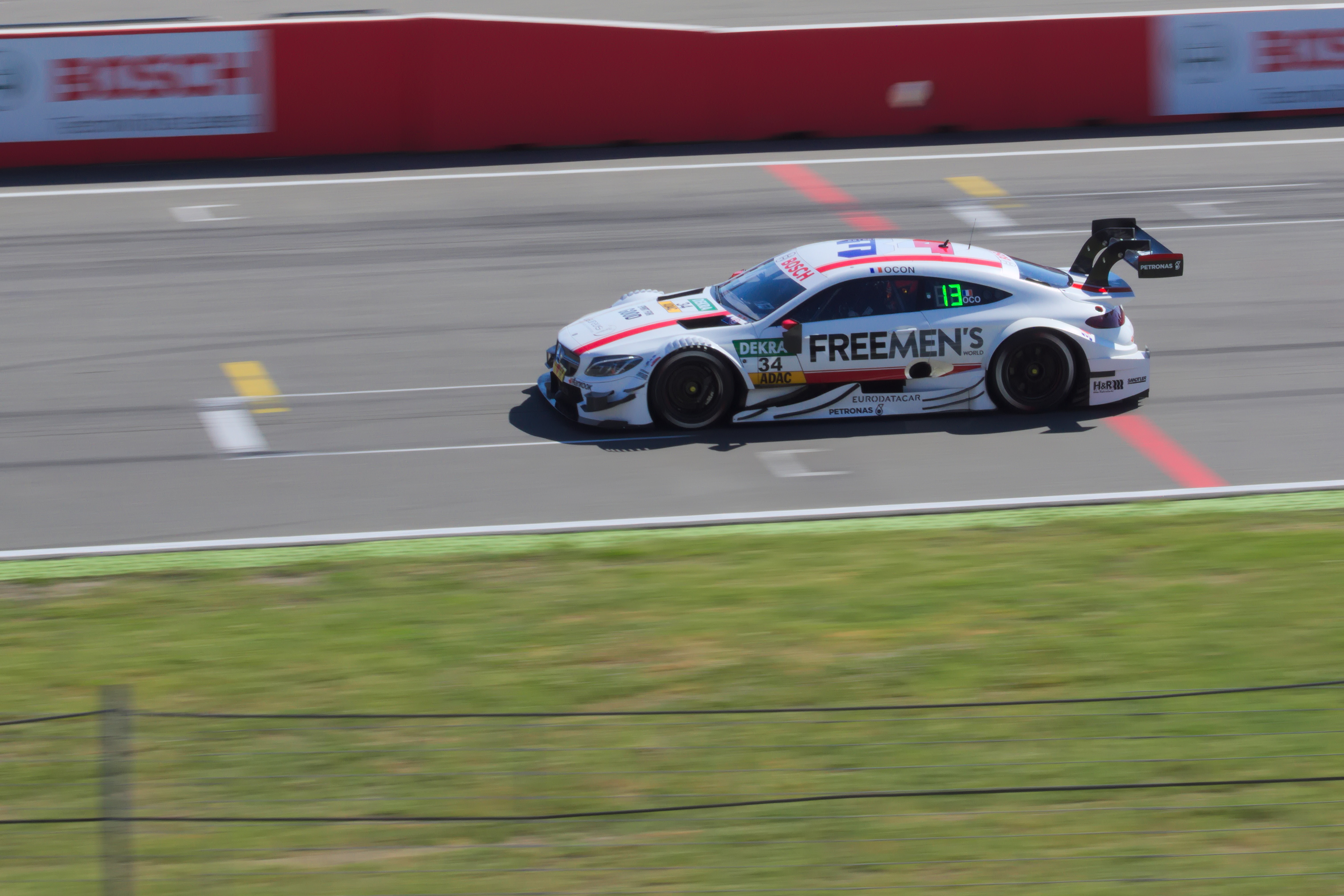
- Mercedes-Benz AMG C63 Class Coupé DTM Mk. I (top); Mercedes-Benz AMG C63 Class Coupé DTM Mk. II (center); Mercedes-Benz AMG C63 Class Coupé DTM Mk. III (bottom)
- Category: Deutsche Tourenwagen Masters (Touring Cars)
- Constructor: (Germany) Mercedes-AMG
- Designer(s): Gerhard Ungar; Michael Weiss
- Predecessor: Mercedes-Benz AMG C-Class W204 DTM
- Successor: Mercedes-AMG GT3

Technical specifications
- Chassis: Carbon-fibre monocoque
- Suspension (front): Double wishbones with H&R spring and damper units to front and rear axles, actuated via pushrods
- Suspension (rear): As front
- Length: 4,650 mm (183 in) without rear wing 5,010 mm (197 in) with rear wing
- Width: 1,950 mm (77 in)
- Height: 1,250 mm (49 in)
- Axle track: 1,950 mm (77 in)
- Wheelbase: 2,750 mm (108 in)
- Engine: Mercedes-AMG 4.0 L (244 cu in) V8 90° naturally-aspirated, front engined, longitudinally-mounted
- Transmission: Hewland 6-speed sequential semi-automatic gearbox
- Battery: Braille B128L Micro-Lite lithium racing battery 12 volts
- Power: 460 hp (343 kW) (2012-2016) later over 500 hp (373 kW) (2017-2018) @ 7,500 rpm
- Weight: 1,100 kg (2,425 lb) (2012); 1,110 kg (2,447 lb) (2013-2014); 1,120 kg (2,469 lb) (2015-2016); 1,125 kg (2,480 lb) + BoP weight allowance of 1,095–1,140 kg (2,414–2,513 lb) (2017 - abolished since Austrian round); 1,115 kg (2,458 lb) (2018) including driver
- Fuel: Aral Ultimate unleaded 102 RON racing gasoline
- Lubricants: Petronas Syntium 7000
- Brakes: AP Racing carbon brake discs with 6-piston calipers and pads
- Tyres: Hankook Ventus tyres AMG (2012-2016) later ATS (2017-2018) forged aluminium wheels
- Clutch: ZF 4-plate carbon fibre reinforced plastic clutch

Competition history
- Notable entrants: (France) ART Grand Prix (Germany) HWA Team (Germany) Mücke Motorsport (Germany) Persson Motorsport
- Notable drivers: (United Kingdom) Jamie Green (Germany) Ralf Schumacher (United Kingdom) Gary Paffett (Germany) Christian Vietoris (United Kingdom) David Coulthard (Canada) Robert Wickens (Spain) Roberto Merhi (United Kingdom) Susie Wolff (Spain) Daniel Juncadella (Germany) Pascal Wehrlein (United Kingdom) Paul di Resta (Russia) Vitaly Petrov (Austria) Lucas Auer (Germany) Maximilian Götz (France) Esteban Ocon (Sweden) Felix Rosenqvist (Italy) Edoardo Mortara (Germany) Maro Engel (France) Sébastien Ogier
- Debut: 2012 Hockenheimring 1 Deutsche Tourenwagen Masters round
Races	Wins	Poles	F/Laps
102 (including non-championship race at Olympiastadion Munich)	31	31	32
- Constructors' Championships: 1 (2018)
- Drivers' Championships: 2 (2015 and 2018)

The Mercedes-AMG C-Coupé DTM is a silhouette racing car designed by Mercedes-Benz for the Deutsche Tourenwagen Masters championship. Mercedes-Benz chose the IAA International Motor Show in Frankfurt to present the new 2012 DTM AMG Mercedes C-Coupé. It is the successor to the AMG-Mercedes C-Klasse race car which was permanently retired after the 2011 season. Since 2015 the car has been renamed Mercedes-AMG C63 DTM. The C-Coupé DTM was initially based on the C204 Mercedes-Benz C-Coupé; for the 2016 season it was updated to reflect the new C205 Mercedes-Benz C-Coupé body style.

== History ==
HWA AG began development, design and construction of the DTM AMG Mercedes C-Coupé in June 2010. The first chassis was assembled in June 2011, with the first vehicle completed in August. At the end of the 2018 season, Mercedes-Benz left the DTM after 19 years after switching to Formula E from the 2019–20 season. The brand returned in the 2021 season - which was now run under Group GT3 regulations - with their Mercedes-AMG GT3 Evo.

== Characteristics ==
The DTM AMG-Mercedes C-Coupé was designed to meet the new and improved safety concept for 2012, which includes a state-of-the-art carbon fibre monocoque and a roll cage made of high strength steel. In order to improve driver protection in the event of an accident, all safety-related components such as the fire extinguishing system and fuel tank have been incorporated into the monocoque. Furthermore, each vehicle is equipped with six crash structures to give the driver additional protection to the front, rear and sides. These carbon fibre crash structures are designed to gradually absorb impact energy, so that the driver is not exposed to high deceleration forces.

The new safety concept was developed jointly by rights holder and promoter ITR e.V., the DMSB and the three manufacturers – Audi, BMW and Mercedes-Benz. In order to verify the performance of the DTM safety concept, the DMSB developed a test programme, which was carried out and analyzed by DEKRA, the independent testing organization. All tests were completed without any problems.

The new DTM AMG-Mercedes C-Coupé is based on the latest Mercedes-Benz C-Class Coupé, which celebrated its world premiere in autumn 2011.

== Chassis ==
The Mercedes-Benz C-Coupé DTM was built to supersede the Mercedes-Benz C-Class race car, a chassis was made directly connected to the carbon fibre monocoque is a roll cage of high-strength steel; CFRP crash elements on the side, front and rear.

=== Weight ===
At the beginning of the 2012 season, homologation rules for DTM cars were changed, an increase in minimum weight from 1,050 kg to 1,110 kg was mandated.

== Engines ==
The Mercedes-AMG C-Coupé DTM car was powered by a Mercedes-Benz AMG naturally-aspirated DOHC engine that carried over from previous Mercedes-Benz AMG W204 C-Class DTM, W203 C-Class DTM and CLK DTM cars. The engine was a 4.0-litre 90 degree V8 with four valves per cylinder, indirect fuel injection, air restricted to 2 x 28 mm by regulations. The power output is approximately 483 hp (360 kW; 490 PS) with a torque of 500 N⋅m (369 lbf⋅ft).

== Achievements ==
As of August 2017, Mercedes-AMG C63 Class Coupé DTM scored 19 victories, 17 poles, 20 fastest laps and 2 driver titles.
