= Aral AG =

German petroleum company

- Formerly: Westdeutsche Benzol-Verkaufsvereinigung
- Type: Aktiengesellschaft
- Industry: Petroleum
- Founded: 1898; 128 years ago
- Headquarters: Bochum, Germany
- Area served: Germany, Luxembourg
- Key people: Patrick Wendeler, CEO
- Products: Gasoline
- Services: Gas stations Convenience stores
- Parent: BP
- Website: aral.de

Aral AG (previously Veba Öl AG) is a German oil company established in 1898 as Westdeutsche Benzol-Verkaufs-Vereinigung GmbH (West German Benzene Marketing Corporation). The company is currently owned by British conglomerate BP after it was purchased in 2002.

The Aral brand of petrol stations has presence in Germany and Luxembourg, but formerly used to be in most countries of Western and Central Europe.

== History ==
The Aral brand was introduced in 1924 and is a portmanteau of the German words "Aromaten" and "Aliphaten", alluding to the aromatic and aliphatic components found in gasoline, respectively. With around 2,400 petrol stations operating, Aral is the market leader in Germany.

On 15 July 2001 Deutsche BP AG agreed to acquire 51% of Veba Öl AG. The acquisition was completed on 1 February 2002. The Aral brand name was retained, and 650 BP stations in Germany were rebranded "Aral". Six BP branded filling stations remained in operation in Germany to protect the company's rights to the name. Elsewhere, in Poland and Austria, Aral stations became BP ones. Aral chains in other countries were sold. Aral's slogan is "Alles super".

BP bought the chain in 2002 as part of a larger deal with German energy group E.ON.

== Corporate affairs ==
Aral has about 2,400 stations in Germany.

== Products ==
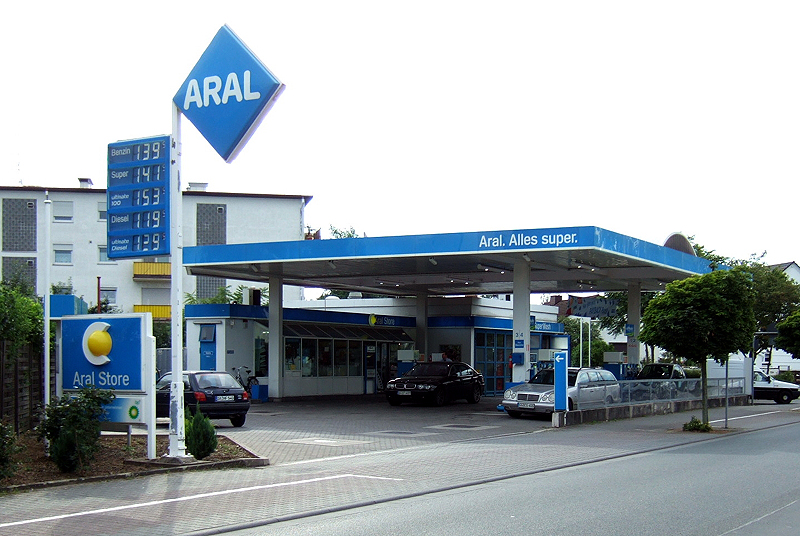
An Aral petrol station (2007)

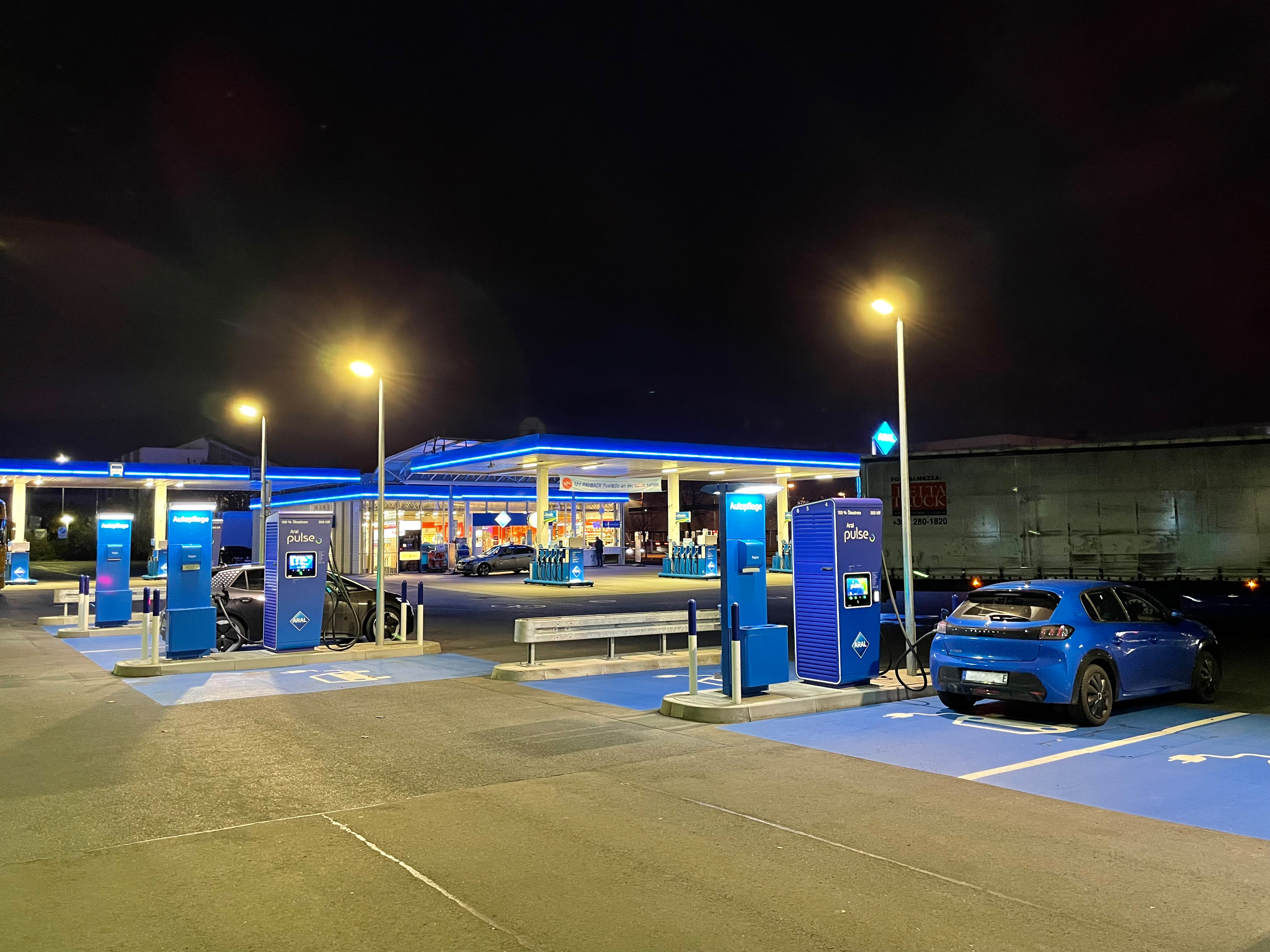
Aral Pulse charging stations in front of an Aral gas station (2021)

Aral sells various petroleum products: Besides classical gasoline, diesel fuel and lubricants, it also sells natural gas, liquefied petroleum gas, such as propane or butane, liquid and gaseous hydrogen and heating oil.

Many Aral gas stations also sell other items under the convenience store name "Aral Store". During the 70's and 80's the brand name used was often "Aral Boutique". Many shops currently have a PetitBistro. Some stations also provide car washes under the name Ultimate SuperWash.

For businesses, Aral offers different types of fuel cards: Aral CardKomfort for small businesses, Aral CardPlus for larger companies and Aral CardTruck with additional truck-related services.

In a customer study on the quality of offers and service in gas stations by the Deutsche Gesellschaft für Verbraucherstudien (DtGV, German Association for CStudies) in cooperation with N24, Aral finished third, behind Q1 and OIL!.

== Commercial automotive and motorcycle partnerships ==
Aral AG is an official long-term recommended fuel of various Volkswagen Group marques (including Volkswagen, Audi, Lamborghini, SEAT and Škoda), Ford, Jaguar Land Rover, Mazda, Renault (including Alpine and Dacia) and Volvo for automobiles as well as MAN for trucks and buses in Germany. Aral AG is also an official long-term recommended fuel of Triumph for motorcycles in Germany.

== Motorsports ==
Aral AG was an official long-term fuel retailer and convenience store for the touring car racing series Deutsche Tourenwagen Masters from 2005 until 2020

Through its parent company BP, Aral AG has also been the official regional sponsor in Germany and fuel supplier of the Audi Revolut F1 Team since the team's inaugural season in 2026.
