= Helsinki Thunder =

Temporary street circuit in Helsinki, Finland

- Grand Prix Circuit (1997)
- Location: Helsinki, Finland
- Coordinates: 60°10′59″N 24°57′45″E
- Opened: 2 June 1995; 30 years ago
- Closed: 25 May 1997; 28 years ago
- Major events: Formula 3000 (1997); FIA GT Championship (1997); ITC (1995–1996)

Grand Prix Circuit (1997)
- Surface: Asphalt
- Length: 3.180 km (1.976 mi)
- Turns: 26
- Race lap record: 1:25.466 ( (Colombia) Juan Pablo Montoya, Lola T96/50, 1997, F3000)

Grand Prix Circuit (1996)
- Surface: Asphalt
- Length: 3.180 km (1.976 mi)
- Turns: 22
- Race lap record: 1:26.577 ( (Germany) Hans-Joachim Stuck, Opel Calibra V6 4x4, 1996, Class 1)

Grand Prix Circuit (1995)
- Surface: Asphalt
- Length: 3.301 km (2.051 mi)
- Turns: 16
- Race lap record: 1:25.930 ( (Italy) Stefano Modena, Alfa Romeo 155 V6 TI, 1995, Class 1)

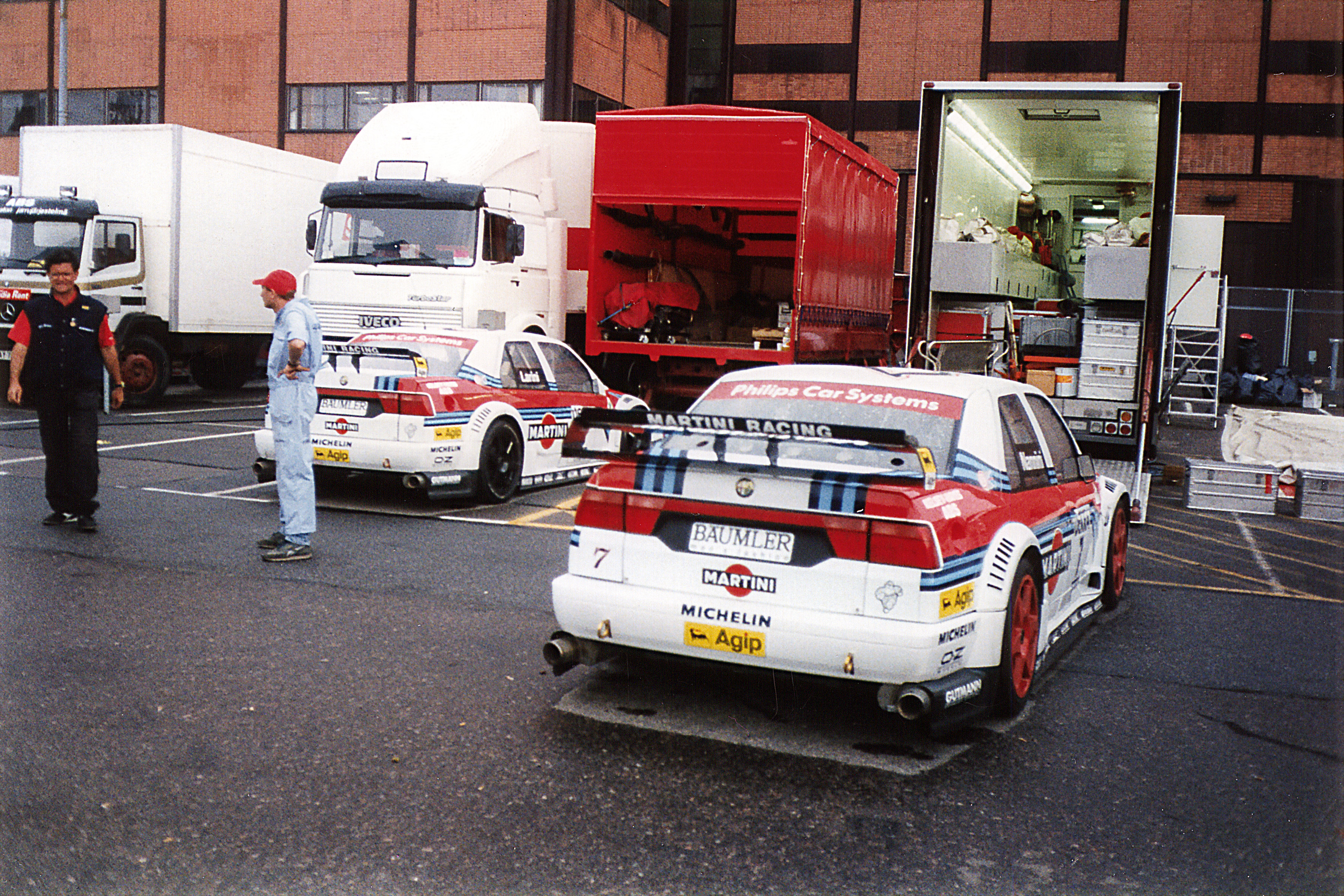
Helsinki Thunder DTM ITC 1995 Martini Racing Alfa Romeo 155 V6 TI Nicola Larini Alessandro Nannini

Helsinki Thunder was a 3.180 km (1.976 mi) temporary street circuit located in Helsinki, Finland. The circuit was conceived by former racing driver Robert Lappalainen. From 1995 to 1997, it hosted events in the FIA GT Championship, International Formula 3000 Championship and International Touring Car Championship.

== Lap records ==
The fastest official race lap records at the Helsinki Thunder are listed as:

Category	Time	Driver	Vehicle	Event	Circuit Map
Grand Prix Circuit (1997): 3.180 km (1.976 mi)
F3000	1:25.466	Juan Pablo Montoya	Lola T96/50	1997 Helsinki F3000 round	
GT1 (Prototype)	1:27.901	Bernd Schneider	Mercedes-Benz CLK GTR	1997 FIA GT Helsinki 3 Hours	
GT2	1:35.076	François Lafon	Porsche 911 GT2	1997 FIA GT Helsinki 3 Hours	
Grand Prix Circuit (1996): 3.180 km (1.976 mi)
Class 1 Touring Cars	1:26.577	Hans-Joachim Stuck	Opel Calibra V6 4x4	1996 Helsinki ITC round	
Grand Prix Circuit (1995): 3.301 km (2.051 mi)
Class 1 Touring Cars	1:25.930	Stefano Modena	Alfa Romeo 155 V6 TI	1995 Helsinki DTM round	
