= Getrag =

Former German supplier of transmission systems

- Company type: Corporation
- Industry: Automotive industry
- Predecessor: Getriebe und Zahnradfabrik Hermann Hagenmeyer AG
- Founded: Ludwigsburg, Germany (1935), as Getriebe und Zahnradfabrik Hermann Hagenmeyer GmbH & Cie KG
- Founder: Hermann Hagenmeyer
- Fate: Acquired by Magna Powertrain and gradually integrated into the company
- Successor: Magna Powertrain
- Headquarters: Untergruppenbach, Germany
- Number of locations: 24, in 11 countries across Europe, North America & Asia
- Area served: Worldwide
- Key people: Mihir Kotecha, CEO; Tobias Hagenmeyer, President
- Products: Automobile transmissions
- Revenue: ▲€3 billion (2011)
- Number of employees: ▼12,500 (2011)
- Parent: Magna Powertrain
- Website: getrag.com (archive)

Getrag (German: [ɡəˈtʁaːk]), stylized as GETRAG, (Note: The name seems to be a syllabic abbreviation of Getriebe und Zahnradfabrik Hermann Hagenmeyer AG.) was a major supplier of transmission systems for passenger cars and commercial vehicles. The company was founded on 1 May 1935, in Ludwigsburg, Germany, by Hermann Hagenmeyer; as the Getriebe und Zahnradfabrik Hermann Hagenmeyer GmbH & Cie KG.

Headquartered in Untergruppenbach, Baden-Württemberg, Germany, Getrag manufactured and developed passenger car transmission products and solutions for the important automotive markets Europe, Asia, and North America with 24 locations and about 12,500 employees worldwide. In 2011, the company had a turnover of three billion euros.

The company had three joint ventures: Getrag Ford Transmissions headquartered in Cologne with Ford Motor Company, Getrag (Jiangxi) Transmission Co. Ltd. with Jiangling Motors Corporation., Ltd. and Dongfeng Getrag Transmission with Dongfeng Motor Corporation. In addition, Getrag supplied transmissions to a variety of automotive manufacturers, including BMW (Mini), Daimler AG, Ferrari, Mitsubishi, Porsche, Qoros, Renault, Volkswagen Group and Volvo. Competitors include Aisin, BorgWarner, Graziano and ZF.

The portfolio ranged from classic manual transmissions, automated manual transmissions, and automatic transmissions based on dual-clutch transmission (DCT) technology to various hybridization solutions, range extender systems, and purely electric drivetrains.

In July 2015, Getrag was acquired by Magna Powertrain for $1.9 billion and was gradually integrated into the company.

== Products ==
=== Longitudinal orientation ===
(Getrag 5mt transmission) 5 speed (1st generation kia Sportage)
217 — 6-speed
BMW 1 Series, BMW 3 Series, BMW 5 Series, BMW Z4, Alfa Romeo Giulia (952)
220 — 5-speed
BMW 1 Series
221 — 5-speed
Jaguar S-Type, Lincoln LS
226 — 6-speed
BMW M3
Maserati 3200 GT
226 AMT — 6-speed automated manual
BMW M3
232 — 4-speed
1968–1972 BMW 2002
233 — 6-speed
Toyota Supra Twin Turbo
Nissan Skyline GT-R (R34)
235 — 5-speed
1975 Jensen-Healey, 1976 Jensen GT
238 — 6-speed
Dodge Ram, Dodge Dakota
240 — 5-speed (1983-1991)
1983 BMW E21, Opel Manta, Opel Rekord, various other Opels
1984–1991 BMW E30 (318i, 318is)
242 — 4-speed (1972-1979)
1972–1975 BMW 2002, 1977–1979 BMW E21
245 – 5-speed (1980-1982)
BMW E21
247 AMT — 7-speed automated manual (2004-2011)
BMW M5, BMW M6
250 — 5-speed (1992-2006)
1992–1999 BMW E36 for engines up to 2.5L
1992–1995 BMW E34 M50
1996–2003 BMW E39 for engines up to 2.5L
1995–2002 BMW Z3 for engines up to 2.5L
1998-2006 BMW E46 for engines up to 2.5L
260 — 5-speed
BMW E28
1984–1991 BMW E30 M20
1988–1991 BMW E34 M20 M30
1989–1991 BMW Z1
1996–2004 Holden Commodore (VS, VT, VX, VY) for the ECOTEC
2002–2005 Cadillac CTS
265 — 5-speed
BMW E23
BMW E24
BMW E28
Jaguar XJS
Opel Monza
Opel Senator A
1986–1992 BMW M3
1987–1990 BMW 320is
266 — 6-speed (1994-2001)
Maserati Quattroporte IV
275 — 5-speed
Mercedes 240D, 300GD, 280GE, 280
275 Z — "dogleg" 5-speed
Mercedes-Benz 190e 2.3–16, 2.5–16 (incl. evolution models) (717.404), C124 AMG 3.4 CE, R129 300SL (717.450)
280 — 5-speed (1983-1994)
1983–1989 BMW M635CSi/M6 (E24), 1985–1988 BMW M5 (E28), 1989–1994 BMW M5 (E34)
290 — 5-speed (1990-1999)
1990–1994 Jaguar XJS
1995–1997 Jaguar XJR
1996–1999 Holden Commodore (VS, VT) for the 5 litre V8
1994–1999 Aston Martin DB7 for the 3.2 litre I6
420G — 6-speed (1993-2006)
1995 BMW E34 M5, 1993–1996 BMW E34 540i, BMW E38 740i/iL, BMW 840i/Ci, 1996–2003 BMW E39 M5, BMW E39 540i, BMW M3 (E46), BMW Z8
560G — 6-speed (1990-1999)
BMW E31 850i, 850Ci, and 850CSi, Maserati Shamal
7DCI600 – 7-speed dual-clutch (2008-2021)
2008–2018 BMW M3
2008–2012 BMW 3 Series 335i Coupé / Convertible
2008–2016 BMW Z4 sDrive35i
2010–2013 BMW E82 1 Series 135i
2011–2016 BMW M5
2012–2018 BMW M6
2014–2020 BMW M4
2016–2021 BMW M2
MT82 – 6-speed (2004-Present)
2011-2014 Ford Mustang (S197)
2015-2023 Ford Mustang (S550)
2024-Present Ford Mustang (S650)
2004-Present Ford Transit
2007-2016 Land Rover Defender
MTI550 – 7-speed (2021-Present)
2021-Present Ford Bronco (U725)

G360 – 5-speed (1989-1993)
1989-1993 Dodge D/W Series

=== Transverse orientation ===
252 — 5-speed
MINI One, MINI Cooper
281 — 5-speed
Fiat Stilo, Fiat Croma, Fiat Idea, Lancia Musa
282 — 5-speed
Buick Skyhawk, Chevrolet Cavalier, Chevrolet Beretta, Chevrolet Celebrity, Oldsmobile Achieva, Oldsmobile Cutlass Supreme, Oldsmobile Cutlass Calais, Pontiac 6000, Pontiac Fiero, Pontiac Sunbird, Pontiac Grand Am
283 — 5-speed
Land Rover Freelander, Rover 75
284 — 5-speed
Chevrolet Lumina, Oldsmobile Cutlass Supreme, Pontiac Grand Prix, Chrysler TC by Maserati (16v only), Chrysler Seled Mexico (Lotus 16v DOHC head)
285 — 6-speed
Ford Focus ST170/SVT, MINI Cooper S
F20 — 5-speed
Chevrolet Vectra, Chevrolet Astra, Chevrolet Cobalt, Chevrolet HHR, Saturn Vue, Saturn Ion, Opel Corsa, Opel Meriva, Opel Combo, Opel Astra, Opel Vectra, Vauxhall Corsa, Vauxhall Meriva, Vauxhall Astra, Vauxhall Vectra, plus various other GM cars
F23 — 5-speed
Chevrolet Vectra, Chevrolet Astra, Chevrolet Cobalt, Chevrolet HHR, Saturn Vue, Saturn Ion, Opel Corsa, Opel Meriva, Opel Combo, Opel Astra, Opel Vectra, Pontiac G5, Vauxhall Corsa, Vauxhall Meriva, Vauxhall Astra, Vauxhall Vectra
F28/6 — 6-speed (with optional four-wheel drive)
Opel Calibra Turbo, Vauxhall Calibra Turbo, Vauxhall Cavalier Turbo
288 — 5-speed
Chrysler PT Cruiser, Mercedes-Benz Vito W638
431 AMT — 6-speed automated manual
Smart Fortwo, Smart roadster
452 — 5-speed
Smart Forfour, Mitsubishi Colt
452 AMT — 6-speed automated manual
Smart Forfour, Mitsubishi Colt
453 — 5-speed
Smart Forfour, Mitsubishi Colt
453 AMT — 6-speed automated manual
Smart Forfour, Mitsubishi Colt
??? – 6-speed
Noble M12
555 — 5-speed
Dodge Daytona Turbo II, Chrysler GS Turbo II
6DCT470 — 6-speed dual-clutch
Mitsubishi Lancer, Mitsubishi Outlander, Peugeot 4007, Citroën C-Crosser
6DCT450 — 6-speed dual-clutch (also known as Ford PowerShift transmission)
Dodge Journey, Chrysler Sebring, Dodge Avenger, Volvo C30, Volvo S40/V50, Volvo C70, Volvo V70, Volvo S80, Volvo S60/V60, Ford Focus, Ford C-Max, Ford S-Max, Ford Galaxy, Ford Mondeo, Ford Kuga
6DCT250 — 6-speed dual-dry-clutch
Ford Fiesta, Ford EcoSport, Ford Focus, Renault Mégane, Renault Scénic, Renault Clio, 2015– Smart Fortwo, 2015– Smart Forfour, 2015– Renault Twingo
6DCT150 – 6-speed dual-clutch for low torque applications
6DCT200 – 6-speed dual-wet-clutch
6HDT200 – 6-speed dual-clutch for hybrid applications
7DCT300 – 7-speed dual-wet-clutch – Renault EDC and Mini/BMW Steptronic Doppelkupplung since MY2018 in FWD applications, Ford Puma and Ford Fiesta since MY2020
7DCT400 – 7-speed dual-wet-clutch – Tougher version of the 7DCT300 that can handle up to 400 Nm of torque
7HDT300/ 7HDT400 – 7-speed dual-wet-clutch for hybrid applications
7DCT500 – 7-speed dual-wet-clutch – Renault EDC

=== Transaxles ===
901 — 4 and 5-speed
Porsche 911 (1964–1968)
902 — 4 and 5-speed
Porsche 912 (1965–1969)
923 — 5-speed
Porsche 912E (1976)
016 — 5-speed
Porsche 924 (1977–1980)
G31 — 5-speed
Porsche 924 GTS
G50 — 5-speed
Porsche 911 (1987–1989)
G50 — 5-speed
Porsche 911 (1987–1989) (G50/00-G50/02)
Porsche 911 Turbo (1989 type 930) (G50/50)
Porsche 964 Carrera 2 (1990–1994) (G50/03-04)
Porsche 964 Carrera 2 RS America (1992–1994) (G50/05)
Porsche 964 Carrera 2 RS (1993) (G50/10)
Porsche 964 Turbo (1991–1994 type 965) (G50/52)
G64 — 5-speed
Porsche 964 Carrera 4 (1989–1994) (G64/00-02)
G40/50 — 6-speed
Porsche 968
440 — 5-speed all-wheel drive
1990–1993 Mitsubishi GTO twin turbo (3000GT VR-4 in some export markets), Dodge Stealth R/T Twin Turbo – This transaxle carries the Mitsubishi designation W5MG1
446 — 6-speed all-wheel drive
1993–2000 Mitsubishi GTO twin turbo (3000GT VR-4 in some export markets), Dodge Stealth R/T Twin Turbo – This transaxle carries the Mitsubishi designation W6MG1
448 — 6-speed
Porsche 911 Turbo, GT3, and Porsche (GT3) Carrera Cup vehicles
466 — 6-speed
Audi A4, Audi A6, Porsche Boxster, Porsche Cayman, Škoda Superb, Volkswagen Passat
466 four-wheel drive — 6-speed
Audi A4, Audi S4, Audi RS4, Audi A6, Volkswagen Passat
7DCL750 – 7-speed dual-clutch
Mercedes SLS AMG
Mercedes-AMG GT
Ferrari California
Ferrari 458 Italia
Ferrari 488 GTB
Ferrari F12 Berlinetta
Ferrari FF – with all-wheel drive
Ferrari Portofino
Ford GT – 2nd Generation (3.5L TT)
8DCL900 – 8-speed dual-clutch
Ferrari Roma
Ferrari Portofino M
Ferrari SF90 Stradale
Ferrari 296 GTB

== Sites ==
- Bad Windsheim, Germany
- Bordeaux, France
- Ganzhou, People's Republic of China
- Gothenburg, Sweden
- Irapuato, Mexico
- Kechnec, Slovakia
- Cologne, Germany
- Ludwigsburg, Germany
- Modugno, Italy
- Nanchang, People's Republic of China
- Neuenstadt am Kocher, Germany
- Neuenstein, Germany
- Rosenberg, Germany
- Sanand, India
- Schaffhausen, Switzerland
- Shanghai, People's Republic of China
- Sankt Georgen im Schwarzwald, Germany
- Sterling Heights, Michigan, USA
- Untergruppenbach, Germany
- Yudu (in the province Jiangxi), People's Republic of China

== See also ==
- Category:Getrag transmissions
