= F25 =

F25 may refer to:

== Vehicles ==
Aircraft

- Fokker F.25, a Dutch passenger monoplane

Automobiles

- BMW X3 (F25), a German SUV

Ships

- ARV General Salóm (F-25), a Mariscal Sucre-class frigate of the Venezuelan Navy
- BNS Bangabandhu (F-25), an Ulsan-class frigate of the Bangladesh Navy
- HMS Medway (F25), a submarine depot ship of the Royal Navy
- KD Kasturi (F-25), a Kasturi-class corvette of the Royal Malaysian Navy

== Other uses ==
- Feuerlilie F-25, a German anti-aircraft missile
- Fluorine-25 (^{25}F), an isotope of fluorine
- Getrag F25 transmission, a General Motors transmission
- Schizoaffective disorder
