= Getrag F28/6 transmission =

The Getrag F28/6 is a 6-speed manual transmission built by Getrag and fitted to the C20LET 2.0L Turbo Opel Calibra.

== Features ==
The F28/6 was designed to follow a transverse oriented C20LET engine feeding the front wheels with an outlet to facilitate a driveshaft to feed the rear wheels as well. If the four-wheel drive system is disengaged, the gearbox feeds the front wheels. Conversion kits are available from aftermarket suppliers to convert the 6-speed transmission to suit a front-wheel drive vehicle, and this is a common upgrade (from the 5-speed F20 transmission) amongst owners of the C20XE and X20XEV Calibras.

Configuration
Clutch diameter	9.0 inches (230 mm)
1st gear ratio	3.57:1
2nd gear ratio	2.16:1
3rd gear ratio	1.45:1
4th gear ratio	1.10:1
5th gear ratio	0.89:1
6th gear ratio	0.74:1
Reverse gear ratio	3.23:1
Final drive ratio	3.72:1 (front); 3.70:1 (rear)

== Designation ==
One interpretation of Opel's gearbox numbering designation is that it refers to the ft·lbf torque capacity, in this case a 380 newton-metres (280 lb⋅ft) torque limit. Instead it may be related to the engine size (the F28 gearbox was fitted to a 2.0L turbo engine, with the 1.4 multiplier applied for turbocharged vehicles).

GM transmissions are usually numerically designated in Newton-meters. For example the 6-speed M32 gearbox was fitted to the Opel/Vauxhall Astra VXR H and has a torque rating of 320 N⋅m (240 lb⋅ft) (hence '32' designation). The maximum torque output of the Astra VXR engine (Z20LEH) is limited to 320 N⋅m (240 lb⋅ft).

=== Nomenclature ===
The letter F stands for front-wheel-drive; Although the F28 is only used in 4WD applications, the base transmission still remains a common FWD gearbox. The number 28 stands for the maximum torque capacity in Newton-meters divided by 10; therefore, 28 means that the transmission is capable of transferring 280 N⋅m (210 lb⋅ft) nominal torque to the input shaft.
