= 1996 ITC Helsinki round =

(Finland) 1996 ITC Helsinki round
Round details
- Round 4 of 13 rounds in the 1996 International Touring Car Championship
- Layout of the Helsinki Thunder
- Location: Helsinki Thunder, Helsinki, Finland
- Course: Temporary street circuit 3.180 km (1.976 mi)

International Touring Car Championship

Race 1
- Date: 9 June 1996
- Laps: 32

Pole position
Driver	(Germany) Hans-Joachim Stuck	Team Rosberg Opel
- Time: 1:25.544

Podium
First	(Germany) Hans-Joachim Stuck	Team Rosberg Opel
Second	(Germany) Manuel Reuter	Joest Racing Opel
Third	(Germany) Klaus Ludwig	Zakspeed Opel

Fastest lap
Driver	(United Kingdom) Dario Franchitti	D2 Mercedes-AMG
- Time: 1:27.219 (on lap 7)

Race 2
- Date: 9 June 1996
- Laps: 32

Podium
First	(Germany) Hans-Joachim Stuck	Team Rosberg Opel
Second	(Germany) Manuel Reuter	Joest Racing Opel
Third	(Finland) JJ Lehto	Team Rosberg Opel

Fastest lap
Driver	(Germany) Hans-Joachim Stuck	Team Rosberg Opel
- Time: 1:26.577 (on lap 11)

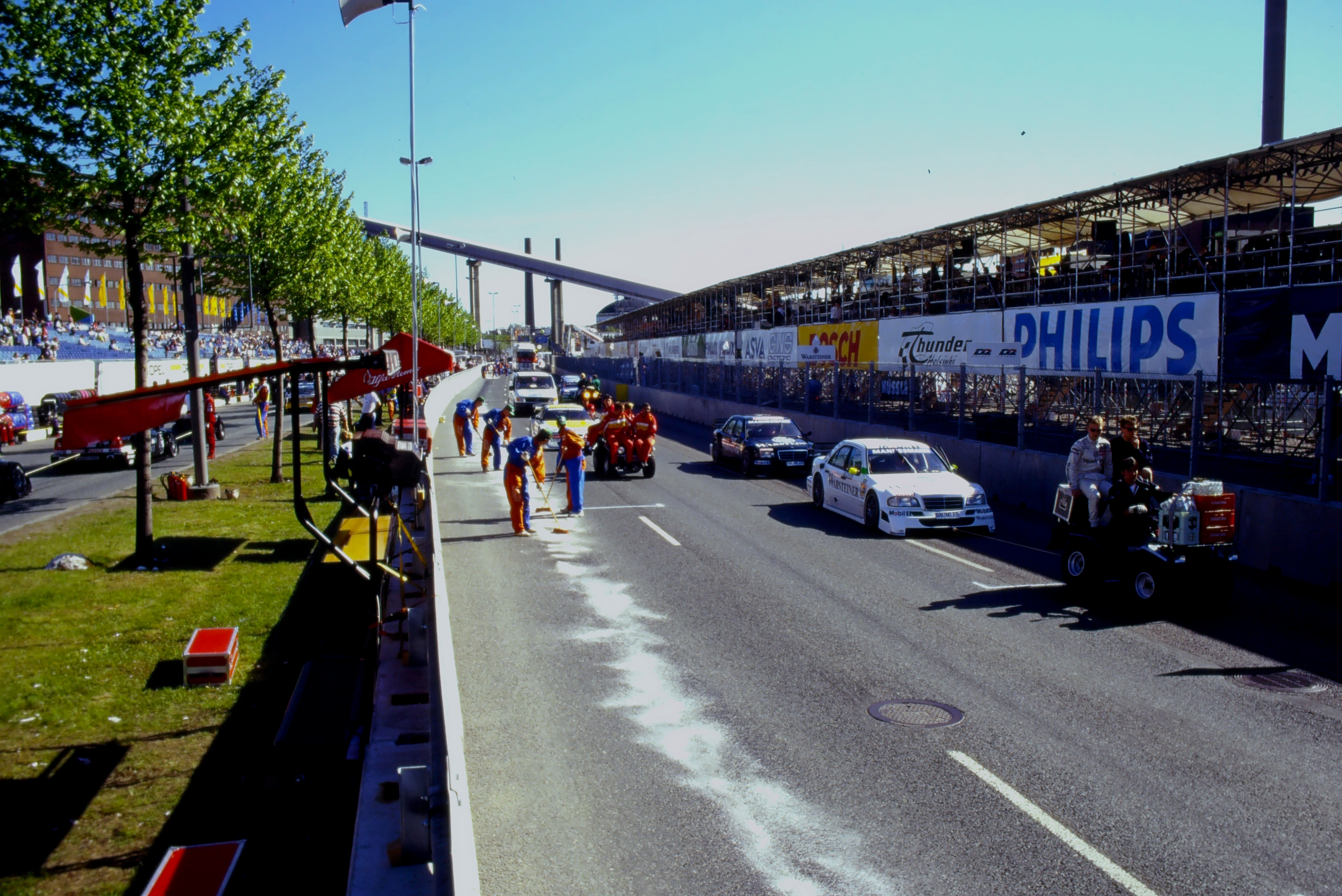
Race marshals and team crews in Helsinki Thunder pit lane and pit straight before qualifying

The 1996 ITC Helsinki round was the fourth round of the 1996 International Touring Car Championship season. It took place on 9 June at the Helsinki Thunder.

Hans-Joachim Stuck won both races, driving an Opel Calibra V6 4x4.

== Classification ==
=== Qualifying ===
Pos.	No.	Driver	Car	Team	Time	Group	Grid
1	44	(Germany) Hans-Joachim Stuck	Opel Calibra V6 4x4	(Germany) Team Rosberg Opel	1:25.544	A	1
2	17	(Germany) Klaus Ludwig	Opel Calibra V6 4x4	(Germany) Zakspeed Opel	1:25.709	A	2
3	10	(Germany) Michael Bartels	Alfa Romeo 155 V6 TI	(Italy) Jägermeister JAS Motorsport Alfa Romeo	1:25.820	A	3
4	16	(Germany) Uwe Alzen	Opel Calibra V6 4x4	(Germany) Zakspeed Opel	1:25.910	A	4
5	43	(Finland) JJ Lehto	Opel Calibra V6 4x4	(Germany) Team Rosberg Opel	1:25.962	A	5
6	6	(Italy) Alessandro Nannini	Alfa Romeo 155 V6 TI	(Italy) Martini Alfa Corse	1:26.659	A	6
7	5	(Italy) Nicola Larini	Alfa Romeo 155 V6 TI	(Italy) Martini Alfa Corse	1:26.659	A	7
8	14	(Italy) Giancarlo Fisichella	Alfa Romeo 155 V6 TI	(Italy) TV Spielfilm Alfa Corse	1:26.829	A	8
9	1	(Germany) Bernd Schneider	Mercedes C-Class	(Germany) D2 Mercedes-AMG	1:27.010	A	9
10	25	(Austria) Alexander Wurz	Opel Calibra V6 4x4	(Germany) Joest Racing Opel	no time	A	10
11	2	(United Kingdom) Dario Franchitti	Mercedes C-Class	(Germany) D2 Mercedes-AMG	1:25.367	B	11
12	8	(United Kingdom) Oliver Gavin	Opel Calibra V6 4x4	(Germany) Joest Racing Opel	1:25.555	B	12
13	9	(Italy) Stefano Modena	Alfa Romeo 155 V6 TI	(Italy) JAS Motorsport Alfa Romeo	1:25.908	B	13
14	7	(Germany) Manuel Reuter	Opel Calibra V6 4x4	(Germany) Joest Racing Opel	1:26.328	B	14
15	18	(Italy) Gabriele Tarquini	Alfa Romeo 155 V6 TI	(Italy) JAS Motorsport Alfa Romeo	1:26.451	B	15
16	11	(Germany) Jörg van Ommen	Mercedes C-Class	(Germany) UPS Mercedes-AMG	1:26.629	B	16
17	24	(France) Yannick Dalmas	Opel Calibra V6 4x4	(Germany) Joest Racing Opel	1:26.850	B	17
18	12	(Denmark) Kurt Thiim	Mercedes C-Class	(Germany) UPS Mercedes-AMG	1:27.159	B	18
19	3	(Denmark) Jan Magnussen	Mercedes C-Class	(Germany) Warsteiner Mercedes-AMG	1:27.319	B	19
20	19	(Denmark) Jason Watt	Alfa Romeo 155 V6 TI	(Italy) Bosch JAS Motorsport Alfa Romeo	1:27.457	B	20
21	4	(Germany) Alexander Grau	Mercedes C-Class	(Germany) Warsteiner Mercedes-AMG	1:27.937	B	21
22	22	(Germany) Bernd Mayländer	Mercedes C-Class	(Germany) Persson Motorsport	1:29.215	B	22
23	21	(Germany) Ellen Lohr	Mercedes C-Class	(Germany) Persson Motorsport	1:30.121	B	23
24	13	(Italy) Gianni Giudici	Alfa Romeo 155 V6 TI	(Italy) Giudici Motorsport	1:32.147	B	24
25	15	(Germany) Christian Danner	Alfa Romeo 155 V6 TI	(Italy) TV Spielfilm Alfa Corse	no time	B	25

=== Race 1 ===
Pos.	No.	Driver	Car	Team	Laps	Time/Retired	Grid	Points
1	44	(Germany) Hans-Joachim Stuck	Opel Calibra V6 4x4	(Germany) Team Rosberg Opel	32	47:29.380	1	20
2	7	(Germany) Manuel Reuter	Opel Calibra V6 4x4	(Germany) Joest Racing Opel	32	+24.015	14	15
3	17	(Germany) Klaus Ludwig	Opel Calibra V6 4x4	(Germany) Zakspeed Opel	32	+26.594	2	12
4	10	(Germany) Michael Bartels	Alfa Romeo 155 V6 TI	(Italy) Jägermeister JAS Motorsport Alfa Romeo	32	+30.060	3	10
5	43	(Finland) JJ Lehto	Opel Calibra V6 4x4	(Germany) Team Rosberg Opel	32	+37.507	5	8
6	24	(France) Yannick Dalmas	Opel Calibra V6 4x4	(Germany) Joest Racing Opel	32	+38.490	17	6
7	9	(Italy) Stefano Modena	Alfa Romeo 155 V6 TI	(Italy) JAS Motorsport Alfa Romeo	32	+41.612	13	4
8	15	(Germany) Christian Danner	Alfa Romeo 155 V6 TI	(Italy) TV Spielfilm Alfa Corse	32	+1:01.801	25	3
9	11	(Germany) Jörg van Ommen	Mercedes C-Class	(Germany) UPS Mercedes-AMG	32	+1:12.592	16	2
10	8	(United Kingdom) Oliver Gavin	Opel Calibra V6 4x4	(Germany) Joest Racing Opel	31	Retired	12	1
11	22	(Germany) Bernd Mayländer	Mercedes C-Class	(Germany) Persson Motorsport	31	+1 lap	22	
12	14	(Italy) Giancarlo Fisichella	Alfa Romeo 155 V6 TI	(Italy) TV Spielfilm Alfa Corse	31	+1 lap	8	
13	16	(Germany) Uwe Alzen	Opel Calibra V6 4x4	(Germany) Zakspeed Opel	31	+1 lap	4	
14	6	(Italy) Alessandro Nannini	Alfa Romeo 155 V6 TI	(Italy) Martini Alfa Corse	31	+1 lap	6	
15	21	(Germany) Ellen Lohr	Mercedes C-Class	(Germany) Persson Motorsport	31	+1 lap	23	
16	1	(Germany) Bernd Schneider	Mercedes C-Class	(Germany) D2 Mercedes-AMG	31	+1 lap	9	
17	2	(United Kingdom) Dario Franchitti	Mercedes C-Class	(Germany) D2 Mercedes-AMG	30	Retired	11	
18	12	(Denmark) Kurt Thiim	Mercedes C-Class	(Germany) UPS Mercedes-AMG	29	Retired	18	
19	13	(Italy) Gianni Giudici	Alfa Romeo 155 V6 TI	(Italy) Giudici Motorsport	29	+3 laps	23	
Ret	4	(Germany) Alexander Grau	Mercedes C-Class	(Germany) Warsteiner Mercedes-AMG	26	Retired	21	
Ret	25	(Austria) Alexander Wurz	Opel Calibra V6 4x4	(Germany) Joest Racing Opel	21	Retired	10	
Ret	18	(Italy) Gabriele Tarquini	Alfa Romeo 155 V6 TI	(Italy) JAS Motorsport Alfa Romeo	17	Retired	15	
Ret	5	(Italy) Nicola Larini	Alfa Romeo 155 V6 TI	(Italy) Martini Alfa Corse	16	Retired	7	
Ret	3	(Denmark) Jan Magnussen	Mercedes C-Class	(Germany) Warsteiner Mercedes-AMG	12	Retired	19	
DNS	19	(Denmark) Jason Watt	Alfa Romeo 155 V6 TI	(Italy) Bosch JAS Motorsport Alfa Romeo		Did not start	20	

=== Race 2 ===
Pos.	No.	Driver	Car	Team	Laps	Time/Retired	Grid	Points
1	44	(Germany) Hans-Joachim Stuck	Opel Calibra V6 4x4	(Germany) Team Rosberg Opel	32	49:36.662	1	20
2	7	(Germany) Manuel Reuter	Opel Calibra V6 4x4	(Germany) Zakspeed Opel	32	+13.201	2	15
3	43	(Finland) JJ Lehto	Opel Calibra V6 4x4	(Germany) Team Rosberg Opel	32	+33.680	5	12
4	6	(Italy) Alessandro Nannini	Alfa Romeo 155 V6 TI	(Italy) Martini Alfa Corse	32	+40.467	14	10
5	14	(Italy) Giancarlo Fisichella	Alfa Romeo 155 V6 TI	(Italy) TV Spielfilm Alfa Corse	32	+40.638	12	8
6	5	(Italy) Nicola Larini	Alfa Romeo 155 V6 TI	(Italy) Martini Alfa Corse	32	+56.342	23	6
7	22	(Germany) Bernd Mayländer	Mercedes C-Class	(Germany) Persson Motorsport	31	+1 lap	11	4
8	21	(Germany) Ellen Lohr	Mercedes C-Class	(Germany) Persson Motorsport	31	+1 lap	15	3
9	25	(Austria) Alexander Wurz	Opel Calibra V6 4x4	(Germany) Joest Racing Opel	31	+1 lap^{1}	21	2
10	4	(Germany) Alexander Grau	Mercedes C-Class	(Germany) Warsteiner Mercedes-AMG	31	+1 lap	20	1
Ret	1	(Germany) Bernd Schneider	Mercedes C-Class	(Germany) D2 Mercedes-AMG	26	Retired	16	
Ret	11	(Germany) Jörg van Ommen	Mercedes C-Class	(Germany) UPS Mercedes-AMG	26	Retired	9	
Ret	12	(Denmark) Kurt Thiim	Mercedes C-Class	(Germany) UPS Mercedes-AMG	25	Retired	18	
Ret	24	(France) Yannick Dalmas	Opel Calibra V6 4x4	(Germany) Joest Racing Opel	24	Retired	6	
NC	13	(Italy) Gianni Giudici	Alfa Romeo 155 V6 TI	(Italy) Giudici Motorsport	22	+10 laps	19	
Ret	17	(Germany) Klaus Ludwig	Opel Calibra V6 4x4	(Germany) Zakspeed Opel	22	Retired	3	
Ret	16	(Germany) Uwe Alzen	Opel Calibra V6 4x4	(Germany) Zakspeed Opel	16	Retired	13	
Ret	10	(Germany) Michael Bartels	Alfa Romeo 155 V6 TI	(Italy) Jägermeister JAS Motorsport Alfa Romeo	15	Retired	4	
Ret	9	(Italy) Stefano Modena	Alfa Romeo 155 V6 TI	(Italy) JAS Motorsport Alfa Romeo	6	Retired	7	
Ret	15	(Germany) Christian Danner	Alfa Romeo 155 V6 TI	(Italy) TV Spielfilm Alfa Corse	2	Retired	8	
Ret	8	(United Kingdom) Oliver Gavin	Opel Calibra V6 4x4	(Germany) Joest Racing Opel	1	Retired	10	
DNS	2	(United Kingdom) Dario Franchitti	Mercedes C-Class	(Germany) D2 Mercedes-AMG		Did not start	17	
DNS	18	(Italy) Gabriele Tarquini	Alfa Romeo 155 V6 TI	(Italy) JAS Motorsport Alfa Romeo		Did not start	22	
DNS	3	(Denmark) Jan Magnussen	Mercedes C-Class	(Germany) Warsteiner Mercedes-AMG		Did not start	24	
DNS	19	(Denmark) Jason Watt	Alfa Romeo 155 V6 TI	(Italy) Bosch JAS Motorsport Alfa Romeo		Did not start	25	

Notes:

- ^1 – Alexander Wurz was given a 40-second penalty for causing a collision with Ellen Lohr.

== Standings after the event ==
Drivers' Championship standings

	Pos	Driver	Points
	1	(Germany) Manuel Reuter	116
8	2	(Germany) Hans-Joachim Stuck	62
2	3	(Italy) Alessandro Nannini	51
2	4	(Denmark) Jan Magnussen	51
2	5	(United Kingdom) Dario Franchitti	43

Manufacturers' Championship standings

Pos	Driver	Points
1	(Germany) Opel	131
2	(Germany) Mercedes	87
3	(Italy) Alfa Romeo	75

- Note: Only the top five positions are included for both sets of drivers' standings.
