= Jensen-Healey =

British two-seater convertible sports car

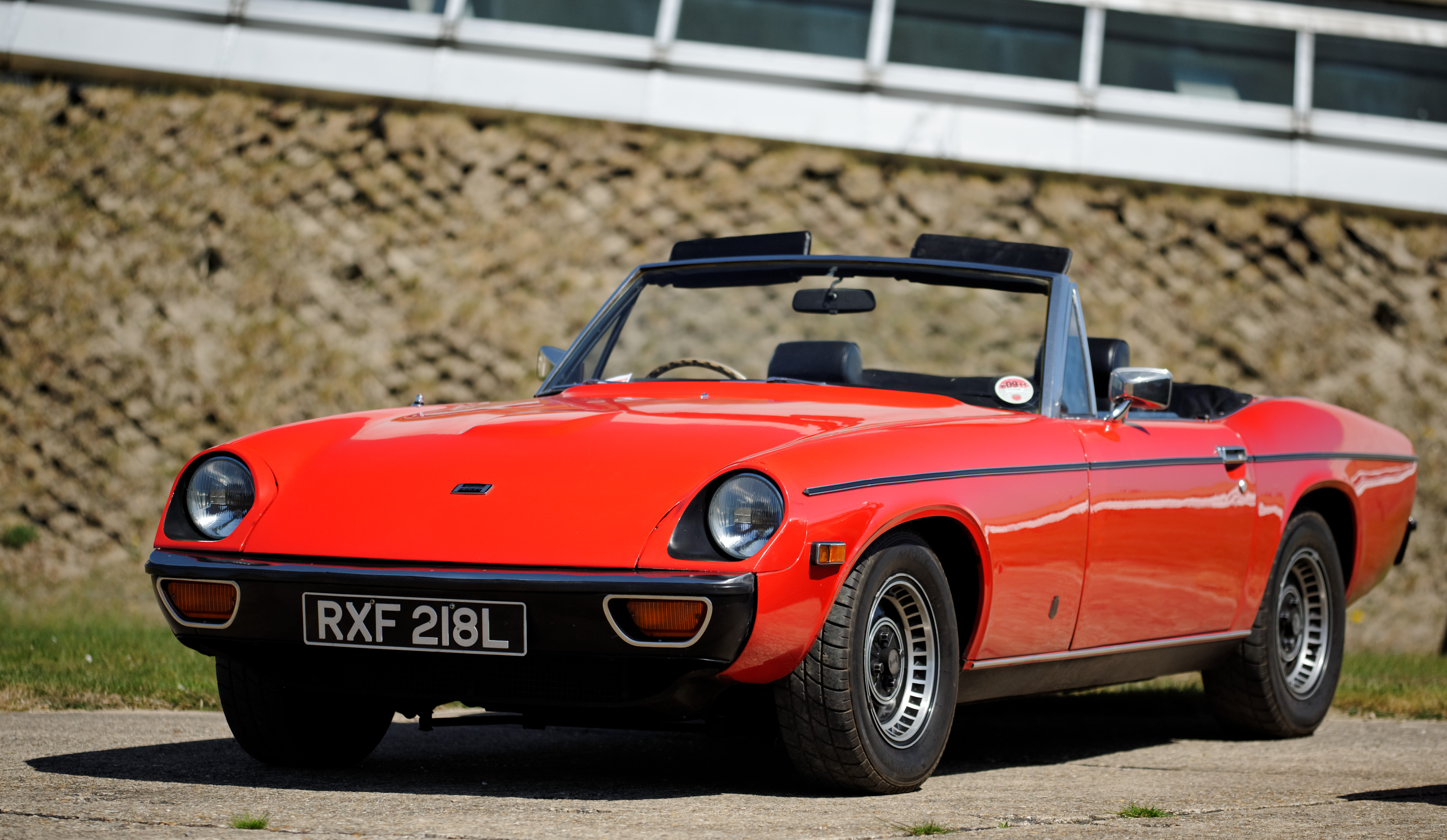

Overview
- Manufacturer: Jensen Motors
- Production: 1972–1976; 10,503 produced
- Assembly: West Bromwich, England
- Designer: William Towns

Body and chassis
- Class: Sports car
- Body style: 2-door convertible
- Layout: Front-engine, rear-wheel drive
- Related: Jensen GT

Powertrain
- Engine: 2.0 L Lotus 907 I4
- Transmission: 4/5-speed manual

Dimensions
- Wheelbase: 92 in (2,337 mm)
- Length: 162 in (4,115 mm)
- Width: 63 in (1,600 mm)
- Height: 48 in (1,219 mm)
- Kerb weight: 2,408 lb (1,092 kg)

The Jensen-Healey is a British two-seater convertible sports car, produced by Jensen Motors Ltd. in West Bromwich, England, from 1972 until 1976.

Launched in 1972 as a luxurious and convertible sports car, it was positioned in the market between the Triumph TR6 and the Jaguar E-Type. A related fastback, the Jensen GT, was introduced in 1975.

== Design ==
When production of the Austin-Healey 3000 ended, Donald Healey opened discussions with Jensen Motors, which had built the bodies for Healey's Austin-Healey cars. The largest Austin-Healey dealer in the U.S., San Francisco-based Kjell Qvale, was also keen to find a replacement for the Austin-Healey 3000; Qvale became a major shareholder in Jensen, making Donald Healey chairman. Donald Healey, his son Geoffrey, and Jensen Motors developed the Jensen-Healey in a joint venture. Hugo Poole styled the body, and William Towns later modified the front and rear to accommodate the low-profile engine and to allow U.S. market cars to be fitted with bumpers to meet increasingly strict U.S. safety regulations. Barry Bilbie designed the unitary body understructure, having been responsible for the Austin-Healey 100, 100-6, and 3000, as well as the Sprite. It was designed to be easy to repair, with bolt-on panels, to keep insurance premiums down.

Early cars (1973-1974.5) had two-piece steel-and-chrome bumpers originally designed for the Jensen-Healey. Later cars used redesigned black rubber bumpers to comply with US government regulations and meet the new 5-mph crash standard.

== Engines and transmissions ==
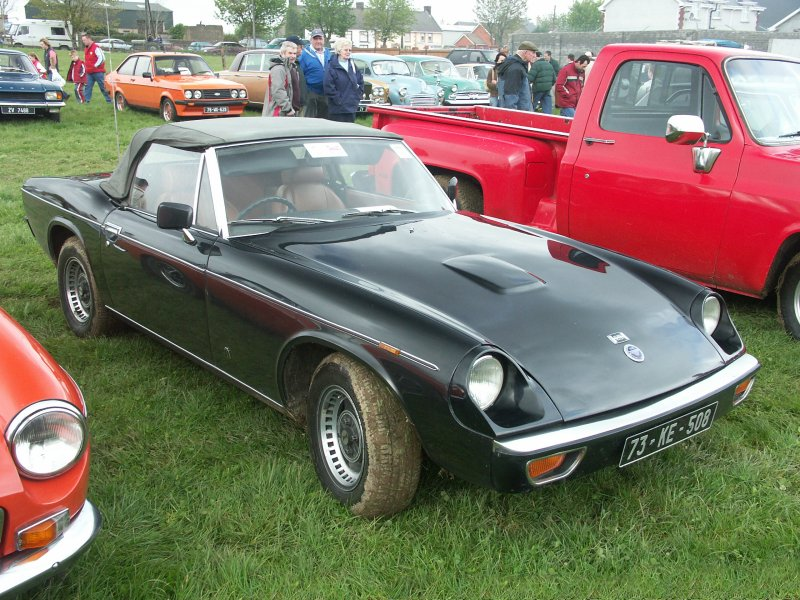
1973 Jensen-Healey at the 2005 Clonroche Vintage Rally, Ireland

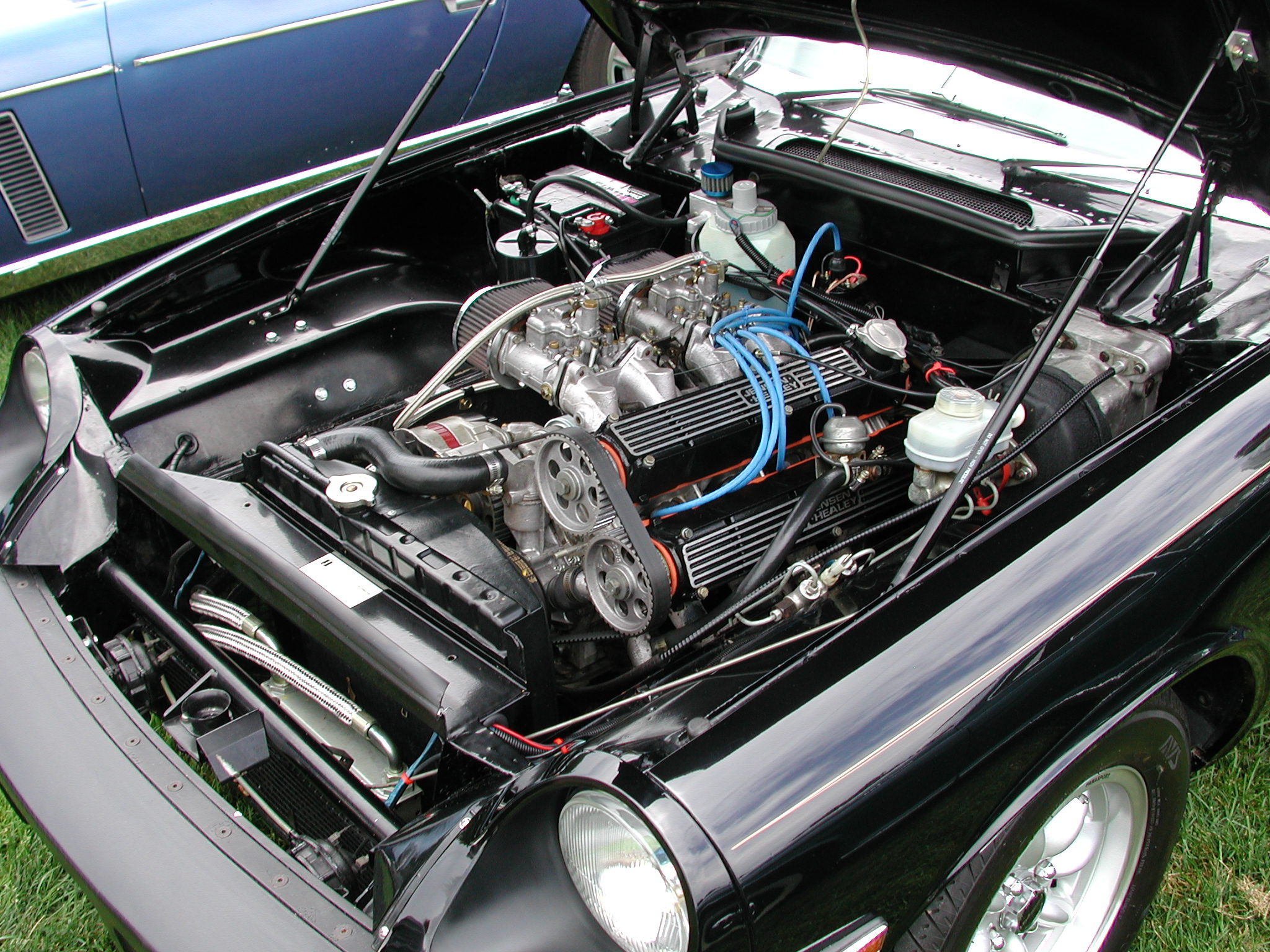
The Lotus Type 907 twin-cam engine fitted with European spec Dellorto carburettors in a Jensen Healey

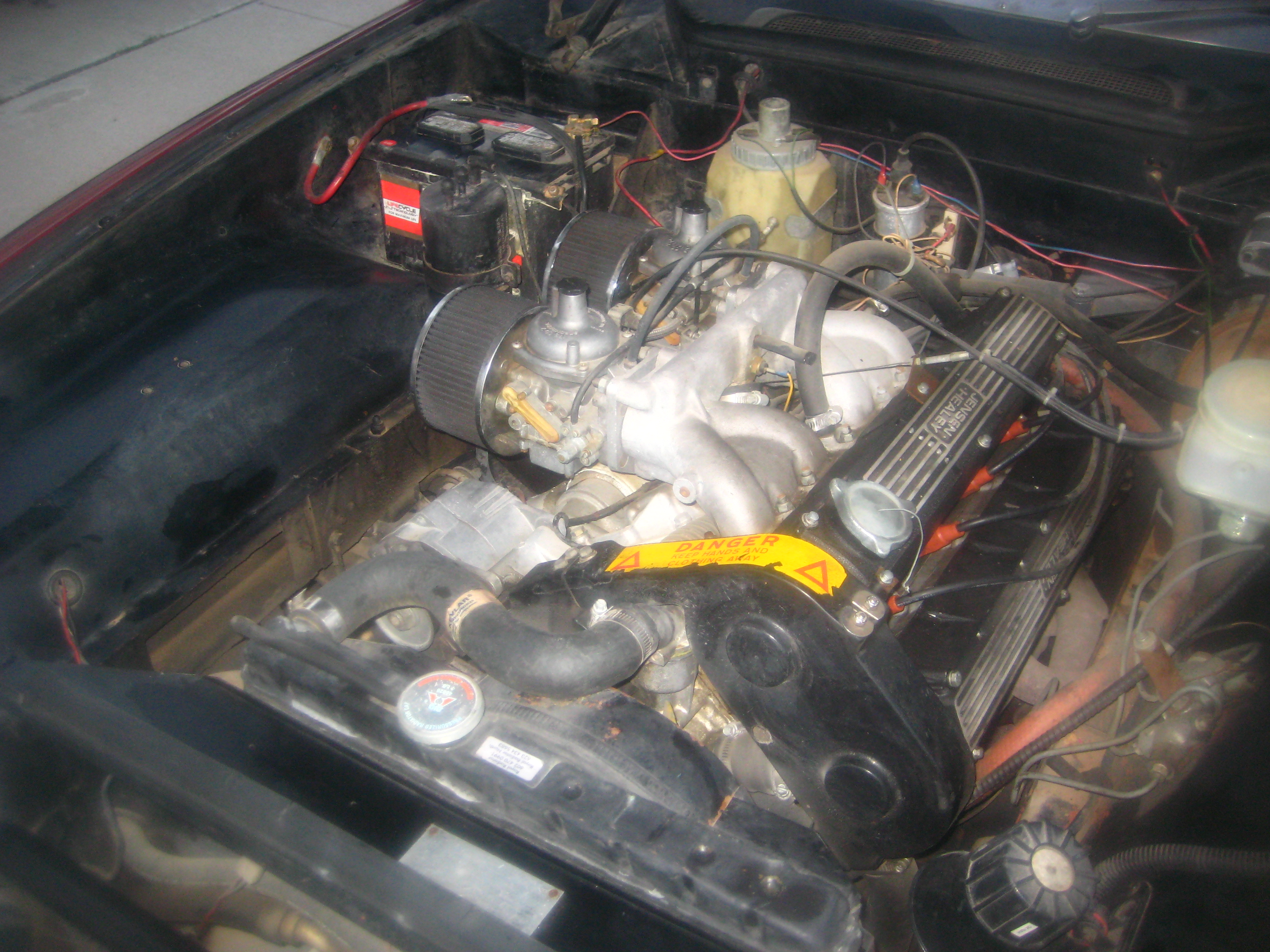
Lotus 907 engine as used in 1974 Jensen-Healey. North American version with dual single-throat Zenith Strombergs.

Various engines were tried out in the prototype stage, including Vauxhall, Ford, and BMW units. The Vauxhall 2.3 L engine met United States emission requirements but not the power target of 130 hp (97 kW). A German Ford V6 was considered, but industrial action crippled supply. BMW could not supply the required number of engines. Colin Chapman of Lotus offered, and Jensen accepted, the new 1973 cc Lotus 907 dual overhead cam, 16-valve all-alloy engine. This multi-valve engine was the first modern dual overhead cam, 4-valve-per-cylinder engine mass-produced on an assembly line. This put out approximately 144 bhp (107 kW), topping out at 119 mph (192 km/h) and accelerating from zero to 60 mph in 7.8 seconds (8.1 seconds for the emission-controlled U.S. version).

=== International variation ===
Vehicles for European distribution and sale contained dual side-draught twin-throat Dell'Orto DHLA carburettors (similar to Weber DCOE carburettors but with improved progression circuits); those exported to the United States had dual side-draught single-throat CD175 Zenith Strombergs in order to meet emissions requirements. The earliest models lacked an oil cooler.

The initial transmission was a four-speed Chrysler unit, also used in the Sunbeam Rapier. The Mk 2 cars from 1975 onwards used the same Getrag 235/5 five-speed gearbox that was optional (but rare) on some models of the BMW 2002, and the Chevette HS. As a deliberate sports car gearbox, this was a close-ratio gearbox: unusually, fifth gear was not an overdrive gear but a direct 1:1 ratio. The Jensen-Healey was sold in Japan, with right-hand drive, but was equipped with USA-spec equipment. It complied with Japanese Government dimension regulations and the engine displacement did not impose a high annual road tax obligation.

== Suspension and braking ==
Suspension was double wishbone and coil springs at the front, and a live rear axle with trailing arms and coils at the rear. Brakes consisted of discs at the front and drums at the rear. The suspension, steering gear, brakes, and rear axle were adapted from the Vauxhall Firenza, with the exception of the front brakes, which were the widely used Girling Type 14 calipers.

== Interior ==
Jensen-Healey interiors started out austere and functional, with plastic centre consoles and black furnishings. (Some earlier models do have brown interiors, however.) In August 1973, aesthetic extras such as a clock, wood grain on the dashboard and glove-box, and padding, as well as optional air conditioning, were added. 1976 Jensen GT models went further, offering an elaborate burr walnut dashboard and paisley-patterned cloth seats, with leather as an option.

== End of production ==
The oil crisis hit Jensen Motors hard, severely damaging sales of its large V8 Interceptor model and worsening its overall financial position. The Jensen GT was then hurriedly brought to market, requiring massive labour expense and further taxing the firm's budget. By 1974, Lotus was able to supply the required number of engines and production reached 86 cars a week, but despite this, the overall situation proved to be too much for the company, which, amid strike action, component shortages and inflation, proceeded to liquidate in 1975 and then close in May 1976.

== Racing ==
Jensen Motors ran a factory team to compete in the Sports Car Club of America (SCCA) D Production Championship. Huffaker Engineering assembled this team in California, USA.

Although it was a new car, the Jensen-Healey became one of the few cars in SCCA history to win a championship in its first year of racing (1973). The roadster also, uniquely in Sports Car Club of America history, captured five SCCA national "D" production championships.

The initial drivers in 1973 were Lee Mueller and Jonathan Woodner. In 1974, Lee Mueller was the only entry. Mueller captured a second D Production championship in 1974. The factory support ended in 1974; however, the West Coast Jensen-Healey dealers combined to put together a late effort in 1975. Huffaker built a new car, and although beginning the SCCA season late, Mueller, driving again, was able to qualify for the runoffs in Atlanta.

Carl Liebich, Stefan Edliss, Tim Lind, Joe Carr, Tom Kraft, and Jim Reilly later drove the Huffaker factory cars.

Bruce Qvale and Joe Huffaker Jr. of Huffaker Engineering, based in Sears Point Raceway, Sonoma, California, successfully raced a Jensen-Healey in SCCA E Production, winning the SCCA title in 1995. From 2005 until 2007, Ron Earp of Cary, North Carolina, raced a 1974 Jensen-Healey in SCCA Improved Touring S class. Lind Bros Racing raced the 1973 National Championship-winning car in Waterloo, Iowa, from 1974 to 1981. Stored from 1982 until 2006, the car was sent back to Huffaker Engineering for a complete restoration to original 1973 specifications. Lind Bros Racing still owns the car, and Pat Lind and Joe Huffaker have driven it to victories in Vintage Racing. In 2013, it won at the Rolex Monterey Historics and was awarded the Presidents Cup.

== Collectibility ==
In recent years, the majority of cars advertised for sale in the UK have been imported from the US, with the number of registered cars in the UK rising from 330 in 2014 to 450 in early 2024.

== Model timeline ==
- Jensen-Healey Mark I: July 1972 – August 1973; VIN 10,000–13,349 (3,356 manufactured)
- Jensen-Healey Mark II and JH5: August 1973 – August 1975; VIN 13,500–20,504 (7,142 manufactured)
- Jensen GT: September 1975 – May 1976; VIN 30,000–30,510 (509 manufactured)

== Jensen-Healey sales by country ==
| Markets | Mk. 1 | Mk. 2 | Total |
|---|---|---|---|
| USA and Canada | 1,945 | 5,689 | 7,634 |
| United Kingdom | 1,114 | 906 | 2,020 |
| Europe | 125 | 209 | 334 |
| Australia & New Zealand | 75 | 211 | 286 |
| The Far East | 98 | 87 | 185 |
| The Middle East | 0 | 33 | 33 |
| Jamaica | 0 | 1 | 1 |
| Unspecified | 0 | 10 | 10 |
| Total | 3,357 | 7,146 | 10,503 |

== See also ==
- List of car manufacturers of the United Kingdom
