= Jensen GT =

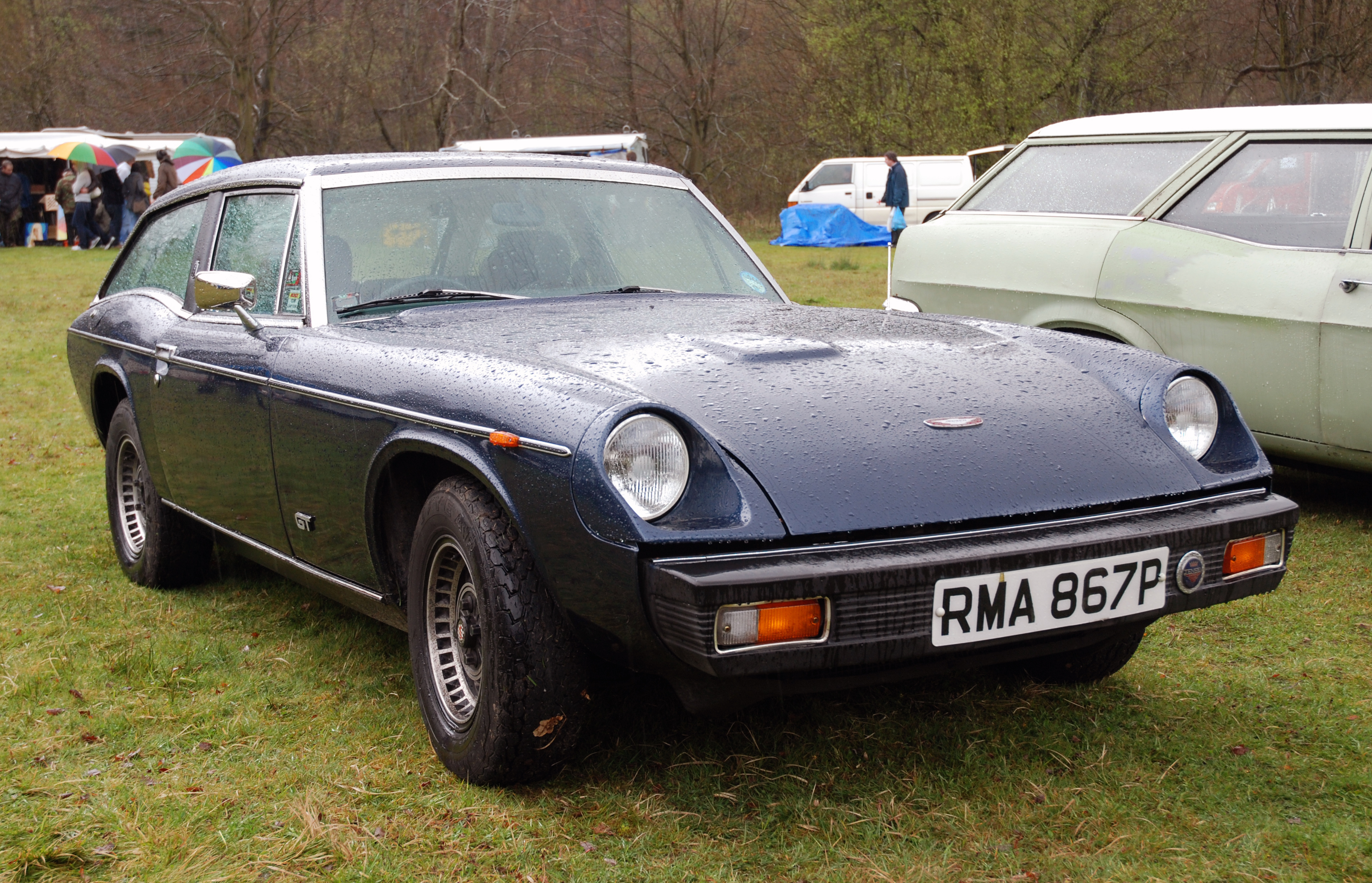

Overview
- Manufacturer: Jensen Motors
- Production: 1975–1976; 511 produced
- Designer: Kevin Beattie

Body and chassis
- Class: Grand tourer
- Body style: 2-door coupé
- Related: Jensen-Healey

Powertrain
- Engine: 1973 cc Lotus 907 I4
- Transmission: 5-speed Getrag 235 manual

Dimensions
- Wheelbase: 92 in (2,337 mm)
- Length: 162 in (4,115 mm)
- Width: 63 in (1,600 mm)
- Height: 48 in (1,219 mm)
- Curb weight: 2,436 lb (1,105 kg)

The Jensen GT is a British sports car. It was introduced by Jensen Motors in 1975 as the shooting-brake version of the Jensen-Healey. The new configuration was a 2+2 design with a very limited back seat. Aside from the body shape and seating, relatively little differed from the roadster. Acceleration and top speed were slightly reduced due to the increased weight and additional smog control components on the engine.

During its short production run from September 1975 until May 1976, 511 Jensen GTs were built before Jensen Motors went into receivership.

== Gallery ==
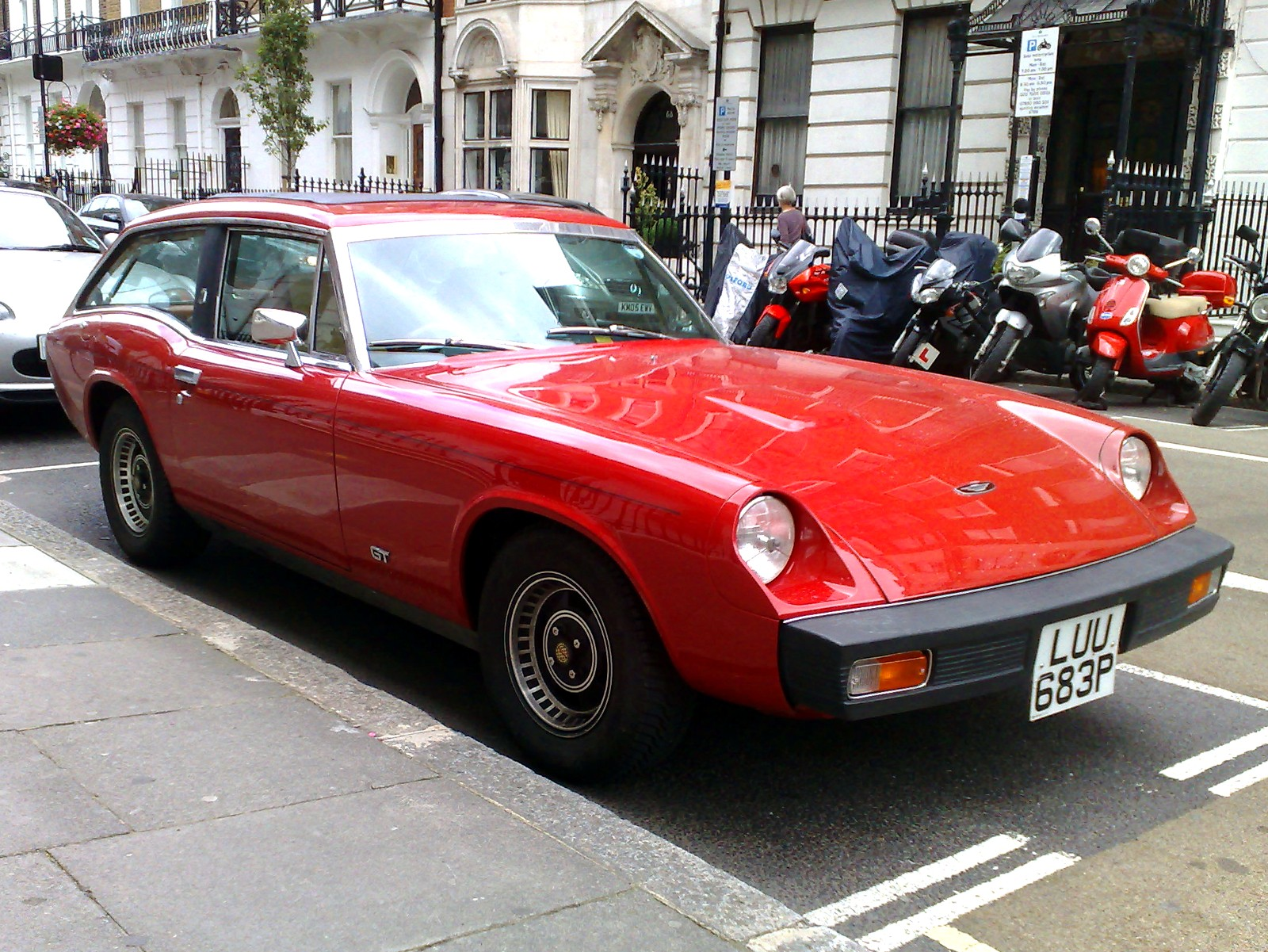
Jensen GT

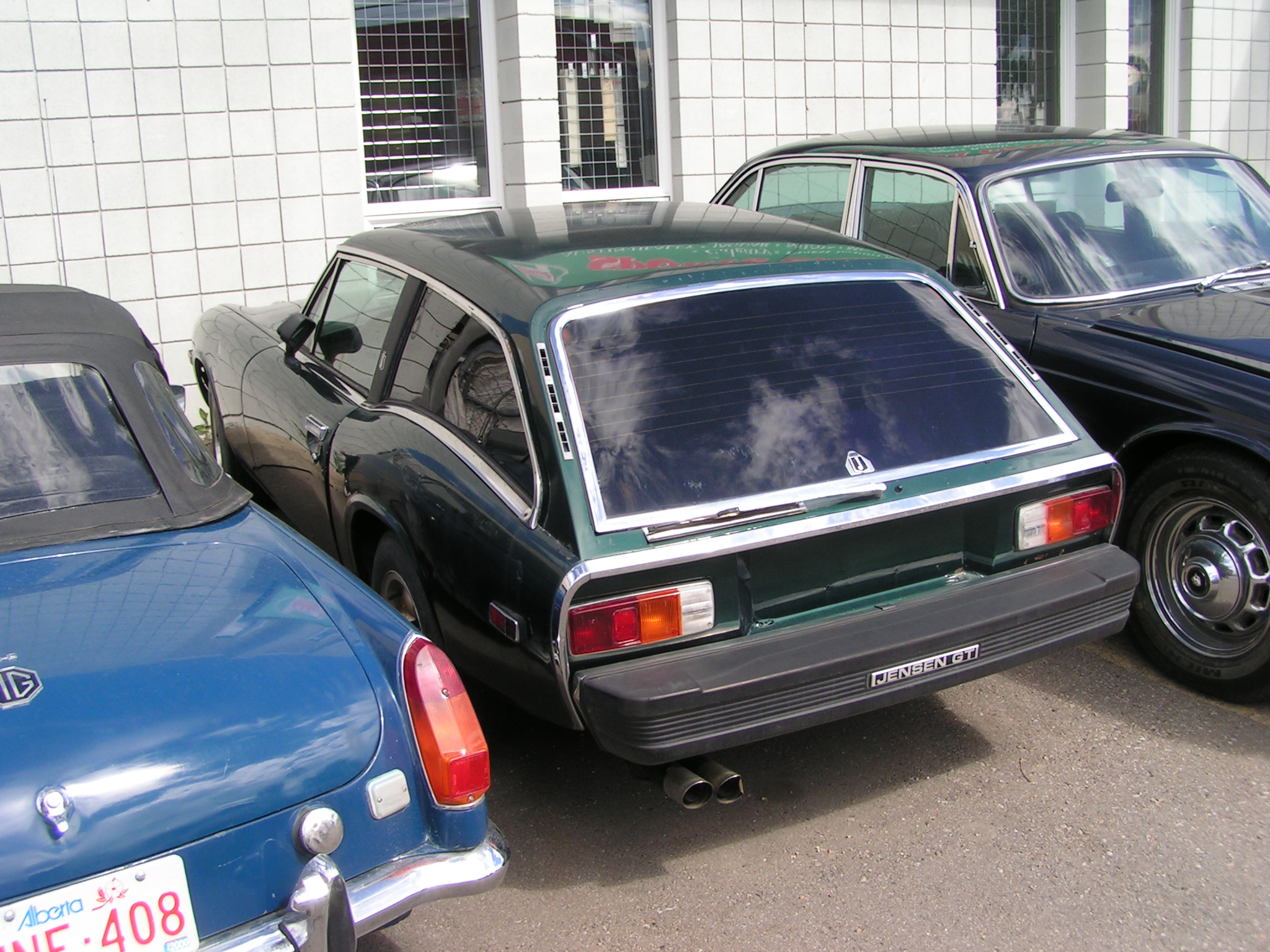
Jensen GT (rear)
