= Getrag F25 transmission =

5 speed manual transmission

The Getrag F25 manual transmission was fitted to many vehicles in the European Opel production line-up including the Opel Calibra. It is a five-speed transmission with the following configuration:

- Front-wheel drive
- Transverse-mounted
- Clutch diameter 9.0 inches (230 mm)
- Dry weight 100 lb (45 kg); wet 102 lb (46 kg)

== Gear ratio ==
Final drive	1	2	3	4	5	R
3.82	3.38	1.76	1.18	0.89	0.77	3.17

Final drive	1	2	3	4	5	R
4.05	3.38	1.76	1.18	0.89	0.77	3.17

- Differential ratio 3.82:1 or 4.05:1

== Designation ==
There have been many references to the numbering designation that Opel elected to utilise for gearboxes; one of the more common arguments is that it refers to the ft·lbf torque capacity of the gearbox, in this case being a 250 lb⋅ft (339 N⋅m) torque limit. Other arguments include that it is simply related to the engine size (the F25 gearbox was often fitted to 2.5-litre engine vehicles).

This argument, that engine size is the justification for the numbering, could be disputed as the Opel Vectra B with the 2.6-litre V6 engine was fitted with an F23 transmission.

As an example, the F25 transmission was fitted to the Opel Calibra 2.5-litre models (C25XE and X25XE engine models).

The numerical designations usually indicate the maximum torque rating of the gearbox in newton metres. For example, the F40 gearbox is rated at 400 Nm or 295 ft-lbs torque; the M32 gearbox is rated at 320 Nm; the F17 gearbox is rated at 170 Nm, and so on.
