= Opel Calibra =

Coupé produced by Opel

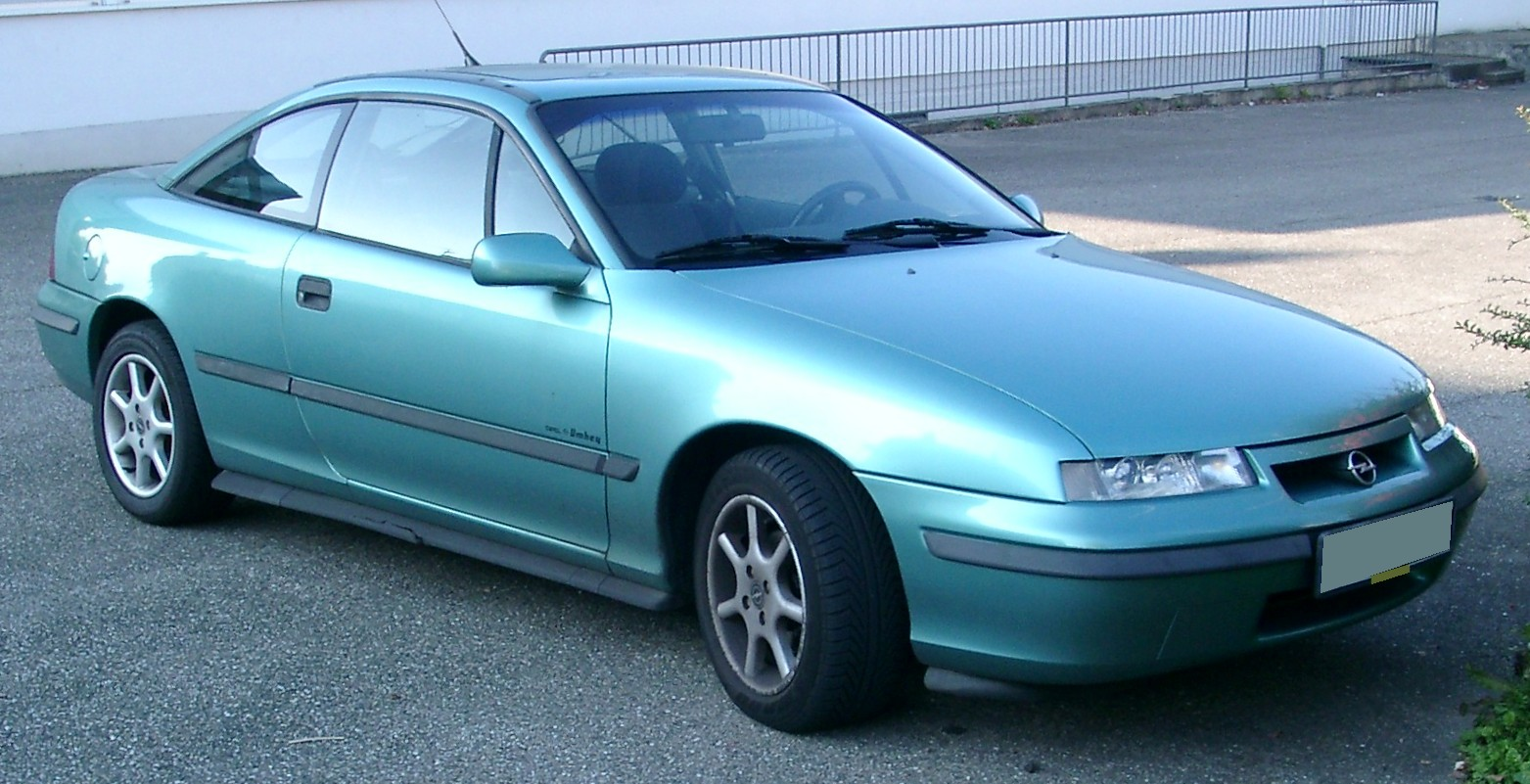

Overview
- Manufacturer: Opel
- Also called: Chevrolet Calibra (Latin America); Holden Calibra (AUS and NZ); Vauxhall Calibra (UK)
- Production: 1989–1997; 239,118 built 4x4: 3,385; V6: 12,015
- Assembly: Germany: Rüsselsheim (Opel Automobile GmbH); Finland: Uusikaupunki (Valmet Automotive)
- Designer: Erhard Schnell, Steve Lewis

Body and chassis
- Class: Sport compact
- Body style: 2-door hatchback coupé
- Layout: FF layout/F4 layout
- Platform: GM2900
- Related: Opel Vectra; Saab 9-3; Saab 9-5; Saturn L-Series

Powertrain
- Engine: 2.0 L C20NE I4; 2.0 L C20XE I4; 2.0 L X20XEV I4; 2.0 L C20LET turbo I4; 2.5 L C25XE V6
- Transmission: 5-speed manual; 6-speed Getrag manual; 4-speed Aisin-Warner automatic

Chronology
- Predecessor: Opel Manta
- Successor: Opel Astra Coupé

The Opel Calibra is a coupé, engineered and produced by the German automaker Opel between 1989 and 1997. In the United Kingdom, where it remained on sale until 1999, it was marketed under the Vauxhall brand as the Vauxhall Calibra. It was also marketed as the Chevrolet Calibra in South America by Chevrolet, and the Holden Calibra in Australia and New Zealand by Holden.

The Calibra was introduced to belatedly replace the Manta and to counter the Japanese sporting coupés of the period. It employs the running gear of the first generation Opel Vectra, which had been launched in October 1988. Calibra production was based in the Opel factory in Rüsselsheim, Germany, and the Valmet Automotive factory in Uusikaupunki, Finland, where production was consolidated in November 1995. The Calibra was initially only available with front-wheel drive, but from November 1990, four wheel drive became available.

== Design ==
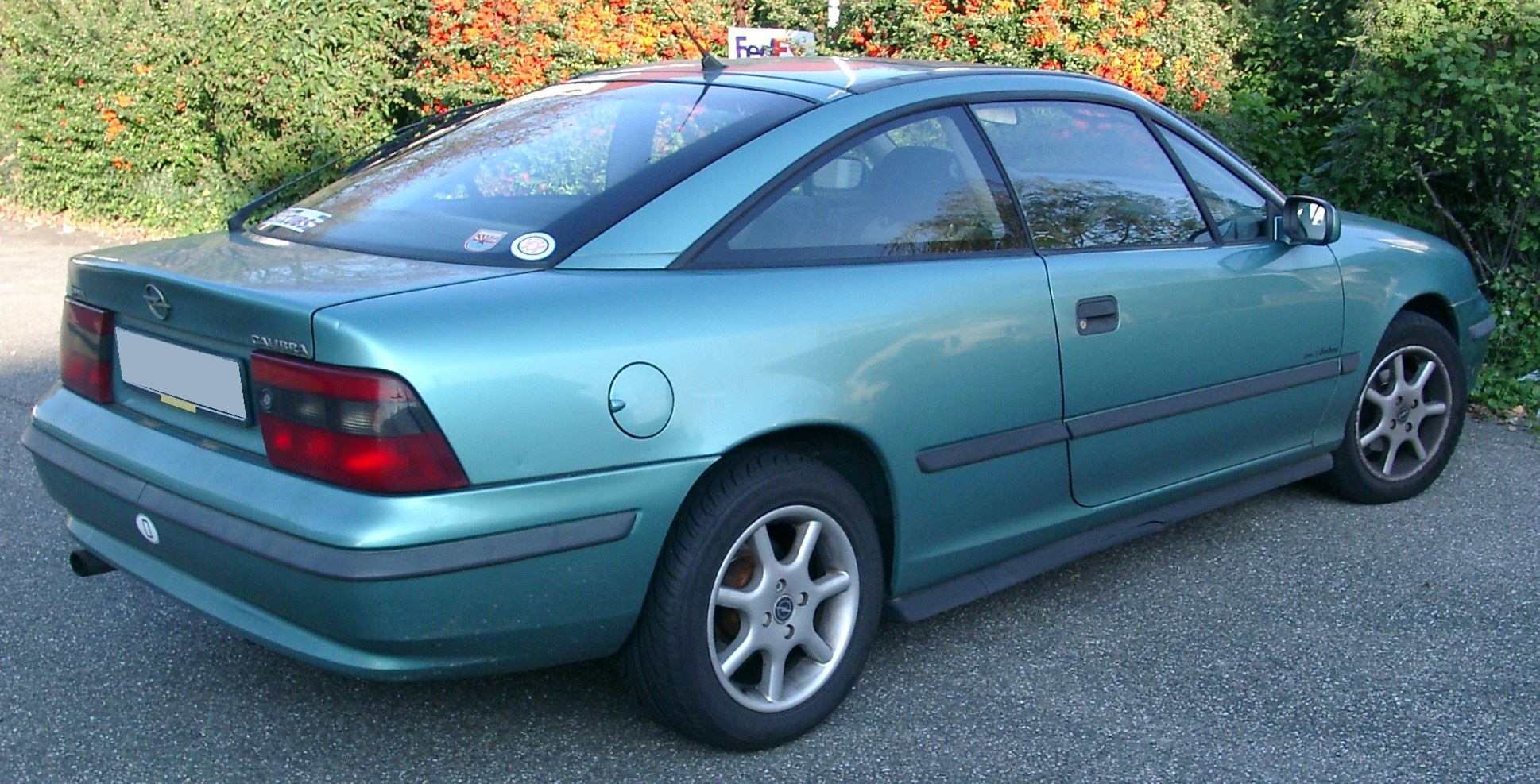
Opel Calibra (1994–1997)

Schematic silhouette used at the 1989 introduction of the Calibra

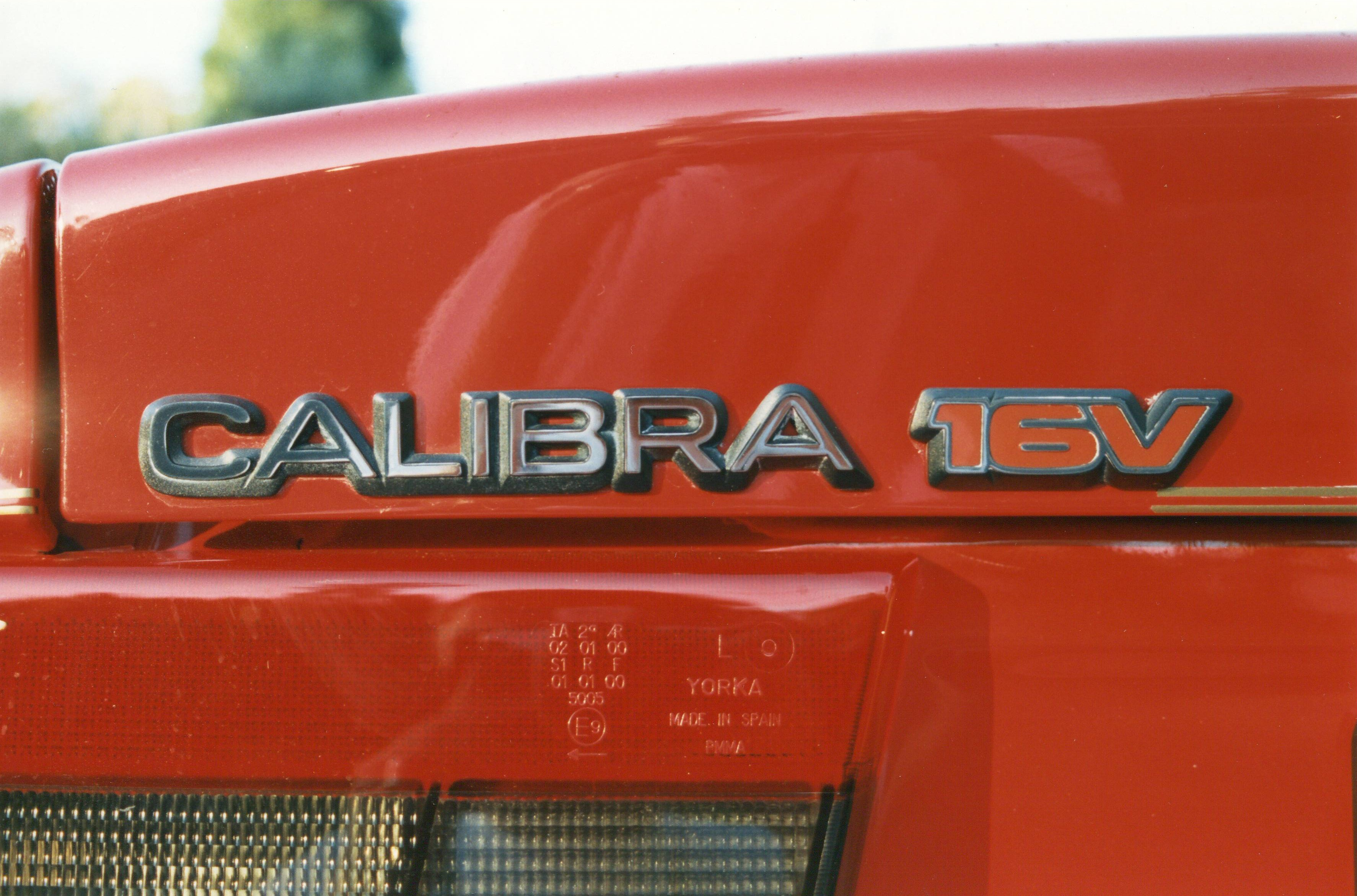
Calibra 16v Badge

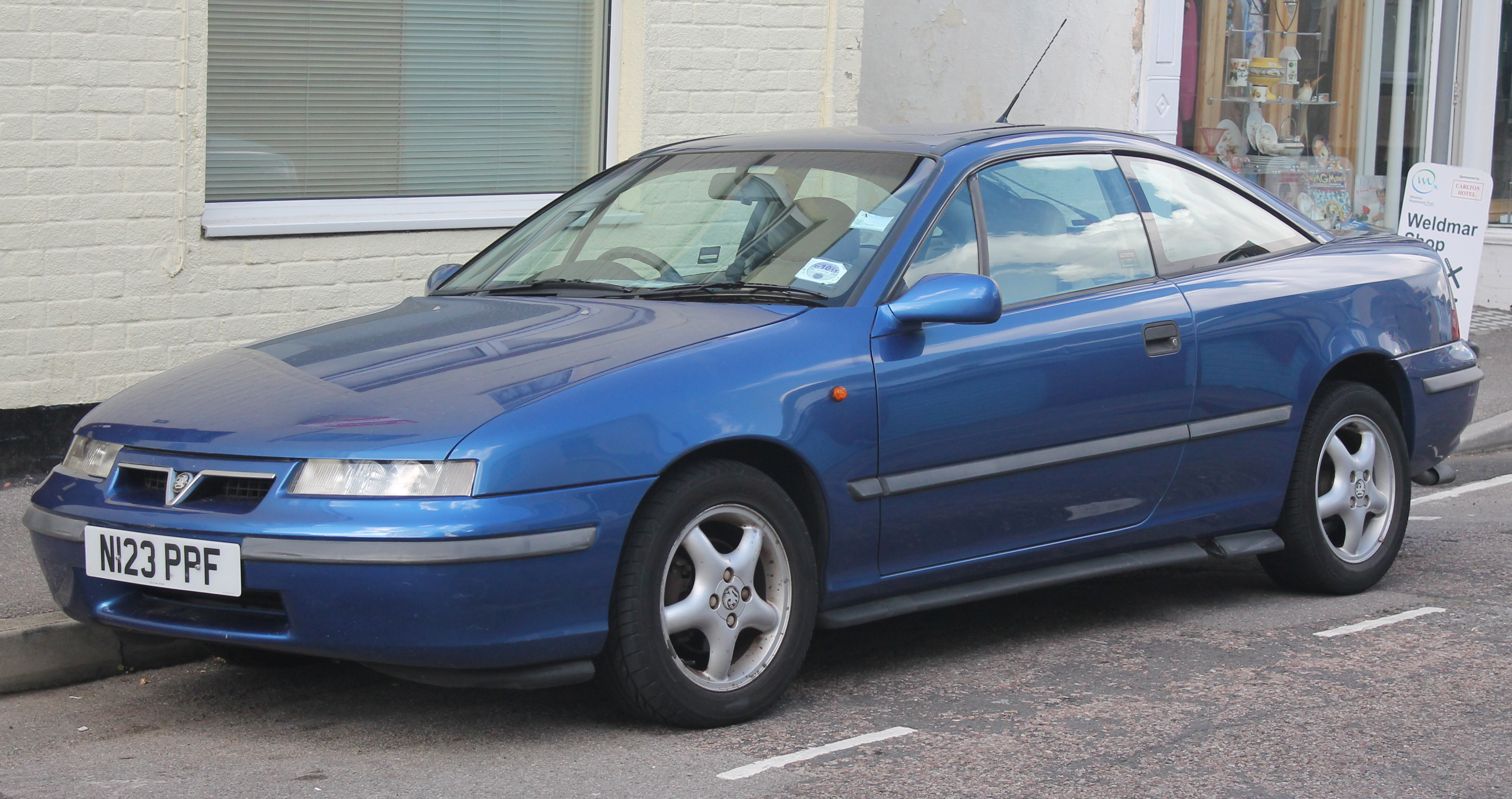
Vauxhall Calibra (1995)

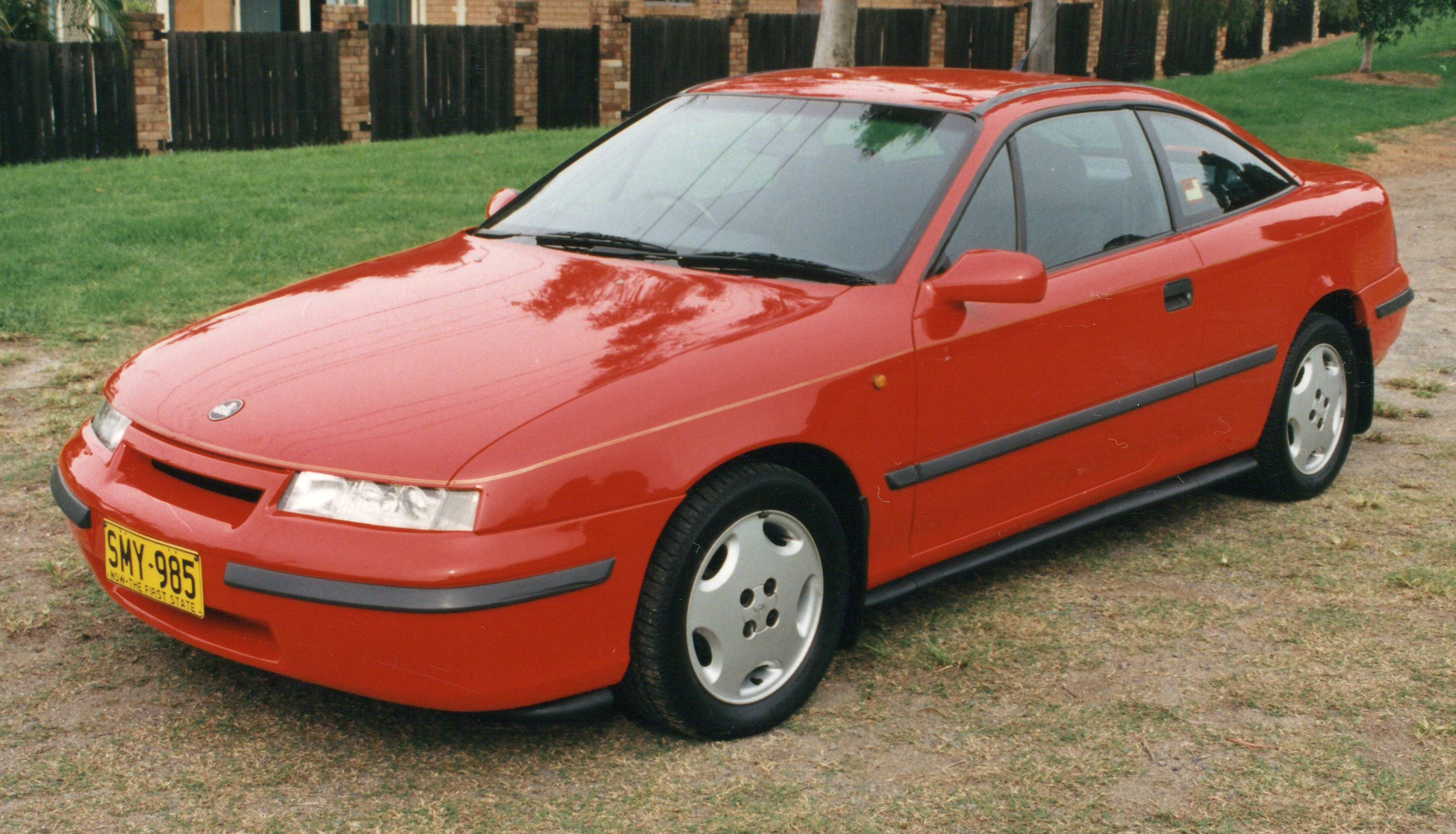
Holden Calibra (1991)

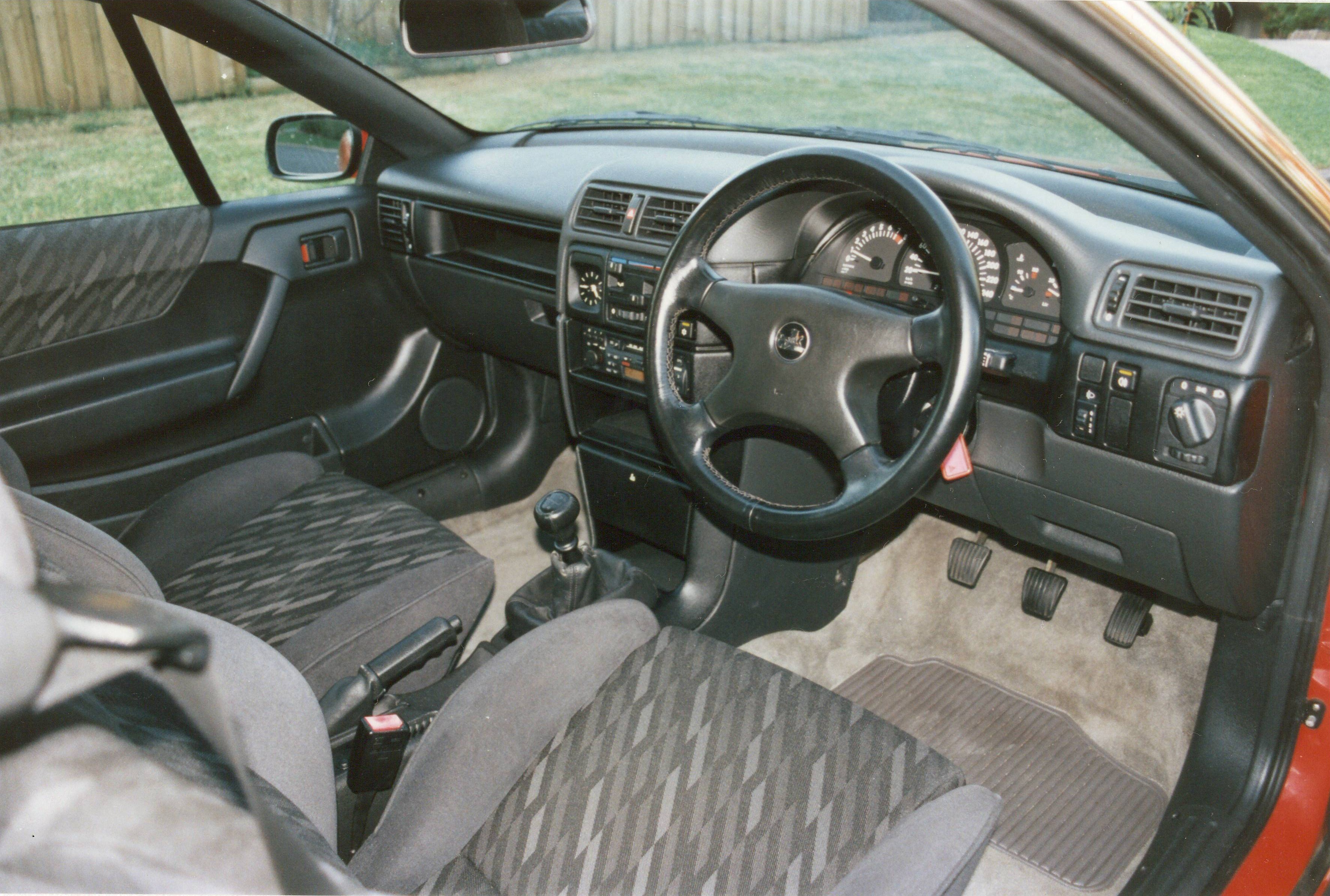
Holden Calibra interior

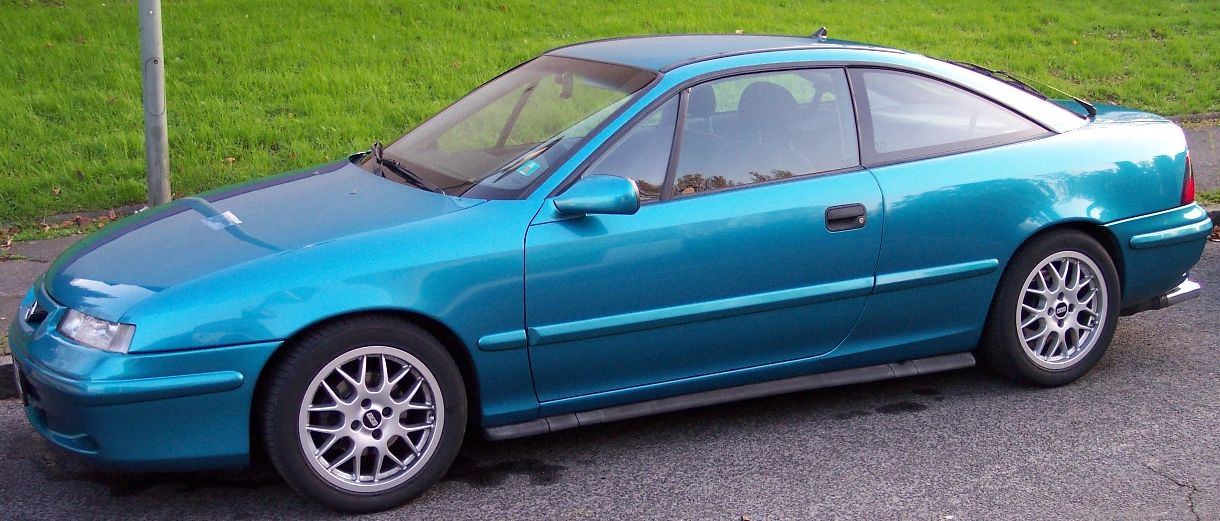
Opel Calibra 2.0 16V Last Edition

The Opel Calibra was styled by GM's designer Wayne Cherry, and German designer Erhard Schnell. As a front-wheel drive three door hatchback coupé based on the Vectra A chassis, its ride and handling are not significantly better than that of the large family car from which it grew. Though it had a stiffer chassis as a whole (better torsional rigidity in NM/Deg). The 4WD turbo version of the car, which had independent rear suspension, featured the rear axle of the Omega A with some minor alterations to it. Irmscher suspension on the sporty limited editions (like DTM, Keke Rosberg, Cliff and Last Edition) also had sharper handling than base models.

The Vectra A chassis and hatchback rear meant the Calibra was relatively practical compared to many other coupés of this size. It could seat four average-sized passengers (above 175–180 cm only compromised in the rear) and hold 300 liters of luggage.

An innovative design feature was the slim 7 cm high headlamp, which was possible to create using the then new ellipsoid technology developed in conjunction with Hella. The headlamp design was key to the sport coupé's unique design and aerodynamics.

When launched on 10 June 1989, the Calibra was the most aerodynamic production car in the world, with a drag coefficient (Cd) of 0.26. To reach the record Cd figure, the prototype Calibra had to be taken to the DNW wind tunnel in the Netherlands, where models could be tested above a rolling road simulating real life airflow. For the final design smaller alterations were made on the preliminary models: tapering the rear waistline and rear side windows by about 50 mm compared to earlier mockups gave about 0,035 Cd improvement, while another 0,035 improvement was reached by altering panel lines, transition points, integrated front spoiler in front of the tires, engine shield and a panel connecting the fuel tank and the lower edge of the rear bumper. The Calibra remained the most aerodynamic mass production car for the next ten years, until the Honda Insight was launched in November 1999, with a Cd of 0.25.

All later 16V, V6, 4x4 and turbo models had a worse Cd of 0.29, due to changes in cooling system, underbody, use of spoked wheels and glass detail.

In UK, Australian and Latin American markets, the Opel grille was replaced by the Vauxhall "V" badge, In Holden and Chevrolet models, same as UK "V" badge.

== Identification of assembly plant ==
The Calibra was built both in Rüsselsheim and at the Valmet Automotive plant in Uusikaupunki, Finland (over 90,000 units). The Porsche Boxster and the Saab 9-3 Cabriolet were also manufactured exclusively there.

Vehicle Identification Number (VIN):

WOL: Adam Opel AG

0000: Free #

85: Model - Calibra

V: Year of manufacture : 1997

Followed by

9: Production plant : Uusikaupunki: Finland Valmet Automotive

1: Production plant : Rüsselsheim Germany : Adam Opel AG

When buying, experts attach great importance to the Finnish built cars have a better build quality. The Rüsselsheim plant was notorious for saving on preservatives. This is assumed why "1" models tend to rust easier, as the inside of the wheel arches were either not preserved enough or not preserved properly at all.

== Commercial life ==
During its lifetime, the Calibra was much more popular in Europe, and outsold its nearest rival, the Ford Probe, which was considered to be underpowered, and very American for most European drivers. Sales of the Vauxhall-badged versions for the UK market commenced in June 1990, with hopes of selling of up to 15,000 examples per year. However, this sales target was never achieved.

In July 1990, after General Motors bought a stake in Saab, it was reported the Calibra would be badged as a Saab in the United States, but these plans did not materialise. There were also plans for a cabriolet version to be produced, but these too failed to materialise.

In the summer of 1994, the Calibra received a light facelift. Most noticeably, the manufacturer badge migrated from its place atop the leading edge of the bonnet into the front grille. Equipment and safety have been developed. Throughout the production run, several special models were launched.

In the United Kingdom, this began with the 'Tickford' conversion in October 1991, however, only 26 Calibras were ever converted. This was followed by Vauxhall's own Special Edition range the SE1 in 1993, and ran through to the SE9 in 1997. These limited run editions had often unique aspects. For example, solar yellow paint on the SE2, or "Icelandic" blue on the SE6. Neither colours were found on any other Calibra in the UK.

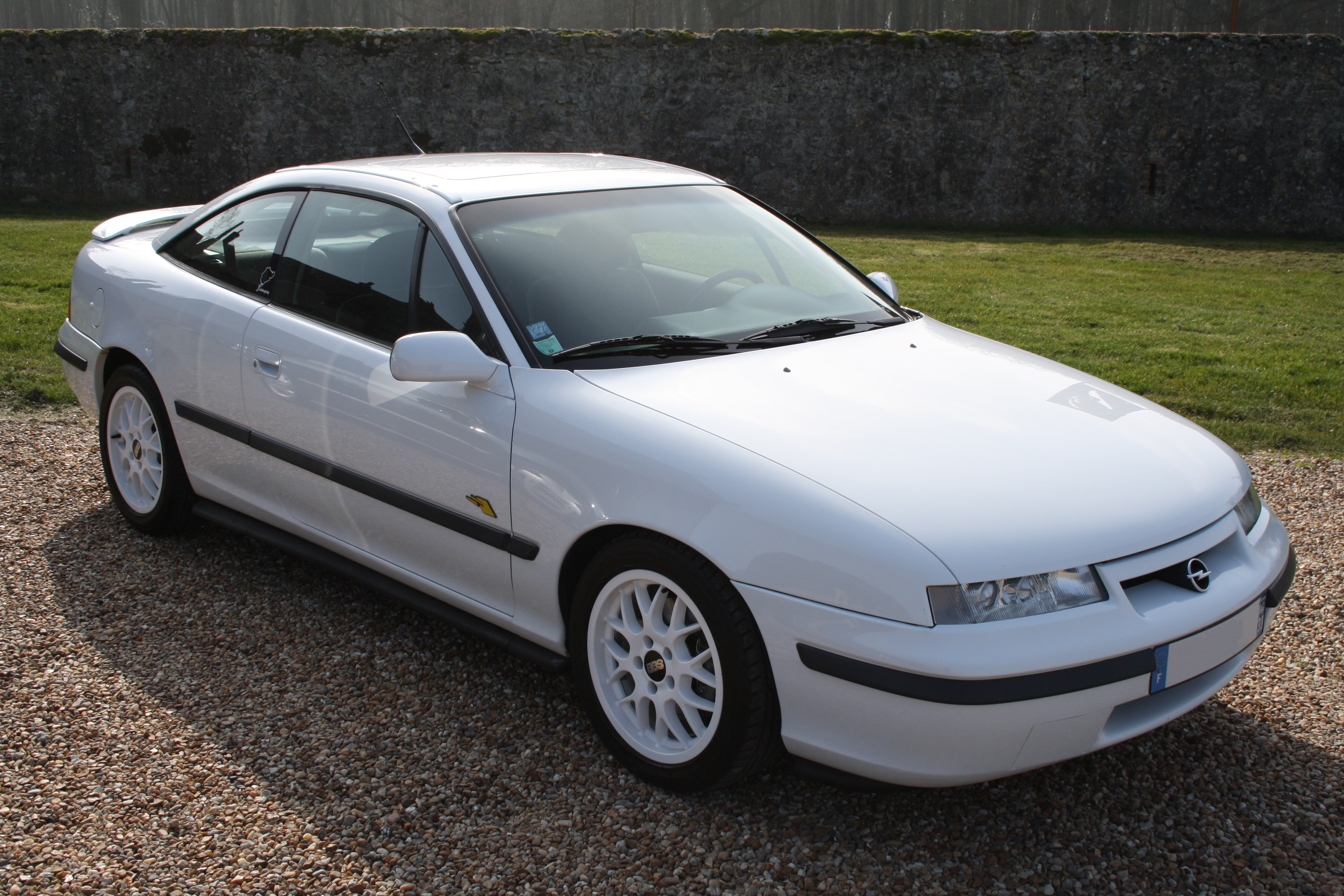
Opel Calibra V6 Keke Rosberg Edition

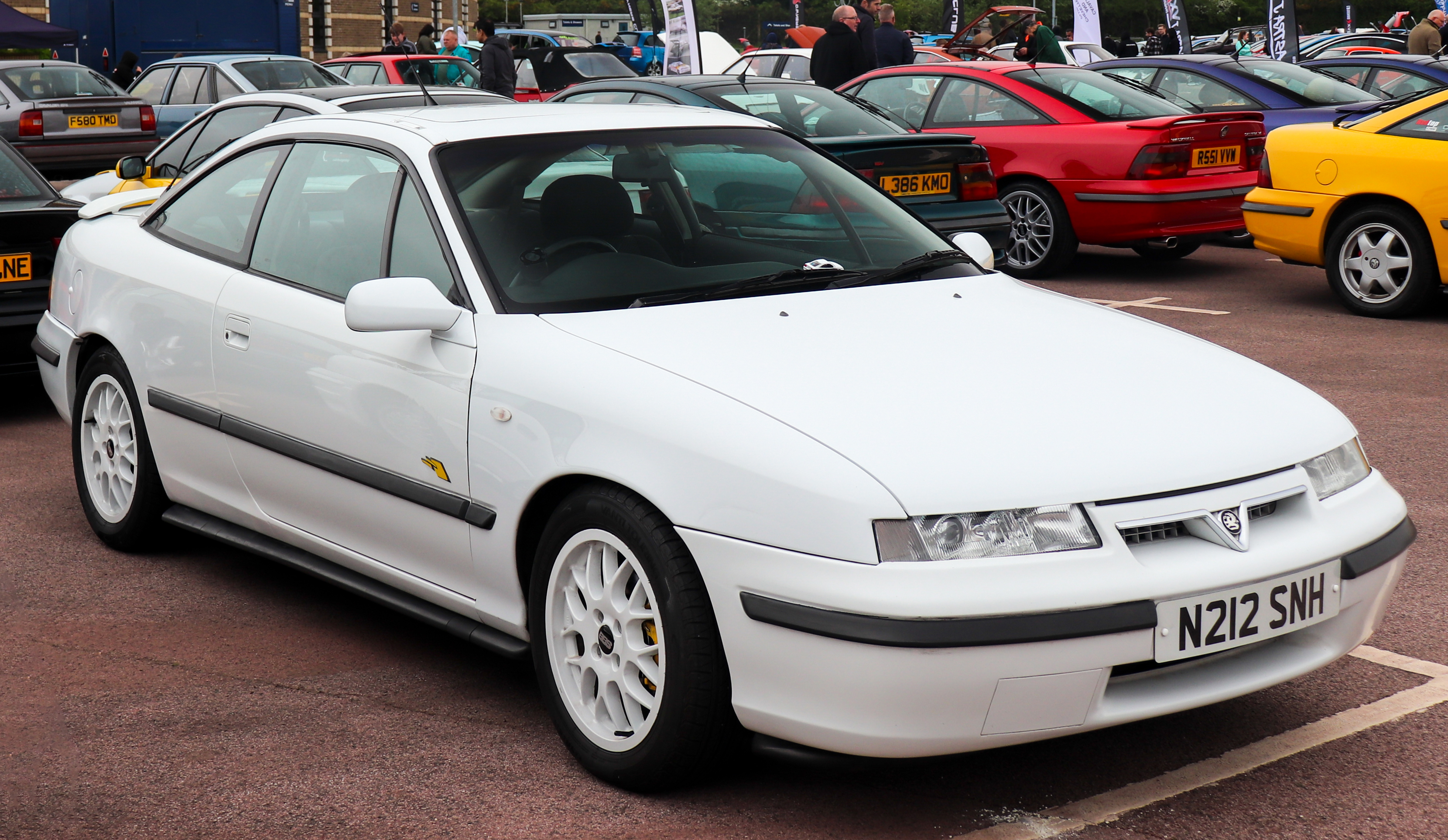
Vauxhall Calibra DTM

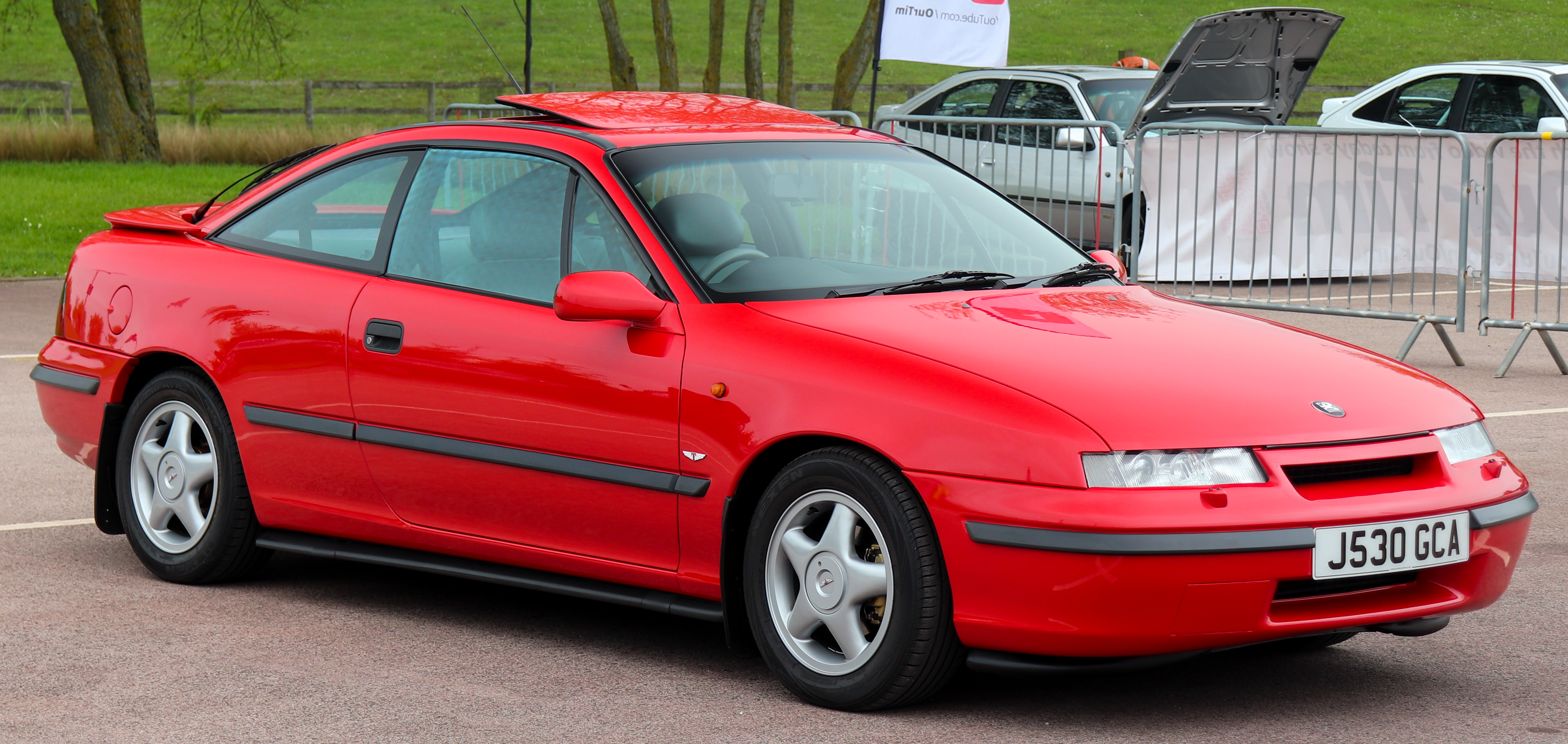
Vauxhall Calibra Tickford

There was also a Keke Rosberg edition first only available in white, in celebration of the Calibra's success in the German Touring Car Championship at the time. In other parts of Europe, special models included the "DTM" edition, the "Cliff" edition, the "Colour" edition, "Last" edition and some special editions only available on certain domestic markets. Some special models sold in continental Europe included lowered Irmscher suspension and a numbered plaque on the ashtray. "DTM" and "Keke Rosberg" featured yellow-gray pattern textile upholstery as standard to remind buyers the colors of Opel DTM racecars. According to different data sources, as well as numbered plaques usually seen on car meets and on the internet the "Keke Rosberg", "DTM", "Cliff" and "Last Edition" cars were produced in relatively low numbers (roughly around a thousand cars per edition).

The last Calibra Turbos were produced in the beginning of 1997, before a final run of Calibra Turbo Limited Editions were rolled out to the UK market. These were all finished in jet black paintwork with an Irmscher spoiler, BBS RX 16" alloys and colour coded body fittings. This final version was also lowered by 35mm on Irmscher springs and dampers. The interior was finished in heated cream leather, with a steering wheel trimmed in grey leather and a plaque showing the build number mounted on the centre console.

In continental Europe, the Last Edition was the final limited edition, offering basically all extras, plenty of colors and full Irmscher set including front bumper, sports suspension and BBS RX 16" alloys.

The Vectra A was replaced in September 1995, but Calibra production continued until June 1997. Although a smaller coupé (the Tigra) was available, the marque was left without a mid sized coupé until the Astra Coupé was launched in the spring of 2000, and with the introduction of the Opel Speedster two-seater roadster in July 2000, three years after the Calibra was discontinued, Opel finally offered a sports car again.

There is different data available about production numbers: 238,164 or 238,647 or 239,118 have been built in total. 93,978 have been built in Valmet, Finland. Nearly 130,000 were fitted with 8V, 83,000 with 16V, 14,000 with Turbo and 12,000 with V6 engines. Around 100,000 were sold in Germany, over 40,000 in the UK, more than 27,000 in Italy, over 17,000 in Spain, around 13,000 in France and over 10,000 in Switzerland giving the major markets of the Calibra. Austria, Belgium and the Netherlands contributed 5,000 units apiece. Only a portion of the fleet remain on the roads: in Germany around 5,060 cars, in the UK around 450 cars, and in the Netherlands, around 750.

== Equipment ==
Both standard and optional equipment were considerably developed throughout the production.

At the beginning of the production the standard equipment of the Calibra 8 valve was a 20 W two-speaker stereo with cassette player, sports seats front with adjustable height on the driver's side, split folding rear seats, ABS, power steering, electric side mirror adjustment, analog clock on the middle console, makeup mirrors in the sunvisors, lockable glovebox, tinted windows, 14-inch alloy wheels and bumpers in body color. Features like air-conditioning, electric windows, fog light, board computer and sun roof were optional.

By contrast better equipped facelifted models with larger engines offered air-conditioning, traction control, electric windows, a 30W 6 speaker stereo system (or 150 W Bose with 6 speaker plus additional subwoofer), CD-changer, central locking, immobiliser, leather upholstery with heated front seats, board computer, sunroof, two airbags with pre-tensioners, alarm system with motion sensors, 15 or 16 inch alloy wheels, etc.

=== Exterior colors ===
The Opel Calibra was available in 28 colors throughout the production run, out of which only 9 were black, gray or white. Although only about a half dozen colors were offered simultaneously at certain time periods, meaning colors on the palette were changed quickly. Limited editions usually featured even less color options, than the standard. During the total production period the following colors were available indicated with code, original German and English names and type of lack:

Exterior Colors (paint code)	Model							
Exterior Colors (paint code)	Standard	Color Edition	Keke Rosberg	DTM	Cliff	Last Edition	SE-SE9 (UK)	Turbo LE (UK)
119 Mistralgrau-Metallic / Mistral Grey	✔							
128 Astrosilber-Metallic / Astro Silver	✔							
138 Starsliber-Mineraleffekt / Star Silver	✔							
140 Rauchgrau-Metallic / Smoke Grey	✔							
144 Magicgrau-Mineraleffekt / Magic Grey	✔					✔	✔	
146 Titaniumsilber-Mineraleffekt / Olive Grey	✔					✔		
200 Schwarz-Uni / Jet Black	✔			✔	✔	✔	✔	✔
262 Baikalblau-Metallic / Westminster Blue	✔							
265 Tech Violett-Metallic / Silk Violet		✔						
266 Novaschwarz-Metallic / Diamond Black	✔							
270 Spektralblau-Mineraleffekt / Spectral Blue	✔							
277 Karibikblau-Metallic / Caribic Blue		✔			✔	✔	✔	
279 Heliotrop-Mineraleffekt / Aurora / High Voltage	✔							
283 Nautilusblau-Mineraleffekt / Nautilus Blue	✔	✔						
286 Keramikblau-Mineraleffekt / Ceramic Blue	✔				✔	✔		
288 Magneticblau-Mineraleffekt / Magnetic Blue		✔			✔	✔	✔	
290 Nordkap-Mineraleffekt / North Cape	✔					✔		
357 Neptuntürkis-Mineraleffekt / Forest Green	✔							
359 Dschungelgrün-Mineraleffekt / Velvet Green	✔							
366 Bermudagrün-Mineraleffekt / Bermuda Green		✔						
368 Islandblau-Mineraleffekt / Icelandic Blue	✔						✔	
369 Rio Verde Grün-Mineraleffekt / Rio Verde Green	✔					✔		
474 Casablancaweiß-Uni / Glacier White	✔		✔	✔		✔		
547 Magmarot-Brillant / Flame Red	✔					✔	✔	
568 Riojarot-Mineraleffekt / Rioja		✔					✔	
571 Amarena-Mineraleffekt / Amarena	✔							
631 Solargelb II-Uni / Solar Yellow		✔		✔			✔	

In the case of the Cliff Motorsport Edition the following color names were applied: Ocean = Magneticblau, Polar = Karibikblau, Barracuda = Keramikblau. Some late Keke Rosberg and DTM models were painted in colors from the standard palette. Colors and special editions offered may be different on certain domestic markets.

== Engines ==
Power was initially from a 2.0 litre 8 valve 117 PS (86 kW; 115 bhp) C20NE, and a Cosworth designed 16 valve fuel injected 152 PS (112 kW; 150 bhp) C20XE four cylinder redtop petrol engine.

For 1992, a turbocharged 2.0 litre 16 valve engine 207 PS (152 kW; 204 bhp) C20LET (turbocharged version of the C20XE) was added to the range. With four wheel drive, a six speed Getrag manual transmission (F28/6) and a claimed top speed of 245 km/h (152 mph).

The Turbo model was also notable for the five stud wheel hubs and the extreme negative camber (inward lean) of its rear wheels.

In 1993, a 170 PS (125 kW; 168 bhp) 2.5 litre V6 (C25XE or SE4) was introduced, available with both manual and automatic transmissions. The V6 was not as fast as the Turbo, but was rather more civilised, and proved to be more reliable than the complex four wheel drive model. 1995 saw the introduction of the X20XEV Ecotec engine, a new version of the classic C20XE 16 valve or "red top" engine.

This marked a reduction in power from 152 PS (112 kW; 150 bhp) to 138 PS (101 kW; 136 bhp) for the 16 valve version, although the Turbo continued with the C20LET.

- 2.0 litre 8 valve SOHC I4 – 117 PS (86 kW; 115 bhp) (all years) (C20NE)
- 2.0 litre 16 valve DOHC I4 – 152 PS (112 kW; 150 bhp) (1990–1995) (C20XE or redtop)
- 2.0 litre 16 valve DOHC Ecotec I4 – 138 PS (101 kW; 136 bhp) (1995–1997) (X20XEV)
- 2.0 litre 16 valve DOHC turbocharged I4 – 207 PS (152 kW; 204 bhp) (1992–1997) (C20LET)
- 2.5 litre 24 valve DOHC Ecotec V6 – 170 PS (125 kW; 168 bhp) (1993–1997) (C25XE from 1994 to 1996; X25XE in 1997)

The availability of engines is dependent on specific model variants, accessory levels and domestic markets.

=== Technical data ===
	2.0 i	2.0 i 16V		2.0 i 16V Turbo	2.5 i V6	
Production period	11/1989–07/1996	11/1989–02/1994	02/1994–06/1997	03/1992–07/1996	04/1993–07/1996	08/1996–06/1997
Engine data
Engine code	C20NE	C20XE	X20XEV (Note: Reduced Emission)	C20LET	C25XE	X25XE
Engine type	I4 gasoline engine				V6 gasoline engine	
Valves per Cylinder	2	4				
Valvetrain	OHC, Timing belt	DOHC, Timing belt			2 × DOHC, Timing belt	
Fuel injection type	Manifold injection					
Charger	–			Turbocharger, Air Intercooler	–	
Cooling	Water-cooled					
Bore × Stroke	86.0 mm × 86.0 mm				81.6 mm × 79.6 mm	
Displacement	1998 cm^{3}				2498 cm^{3}	
Compression Ratio	9,2:1	10,5:1	10,8:1	9,0:1	10,8:1	
Max. Power at 1/min	85 kW (115 PS) /5200	110 kW (150 PS) /6000	100 kW (136 PS) /5600	150 kW (204 PS) /5600	125 kW (170 PS) /6000	125 kW (170 PS) /5800
max. Torque at 1/min	170 N⋅m (125 lbf⋅ft) /2600	196 N⋅m (145 lbf⋅ft) /4800	185 N⋅m (136 lbf⋅ft) /4000	280 N⋅m (207 lbf⋅ft) /2400	227 N⋅m (167 lbf⋅ft) /4200	230 N⋅m (170 lbf⋅ft) /3200
Emission Standard	Euro 1		D3	Euro 1		D3
Drivetrain
Drivetrain, standard	Front Wheel Drive			4 Wheel Drive	Front Wheel Drive	
Drivetrain, optional	4 Wheel Drive			–		
Transmission, standard	5 Gear Manual Transmission			6 Gear Manual Transmission	5 Gear Manual Transmission	
Transmission, optional	4 Gear Automatic Transmission	–	4 Gear Automatic Transmission	–	4 Gear Automatic Transmission	
Measurements (Note: Values in round brackets () mean automatic transmission and square brackets [] mean 4-wheel drive.)
Top Speed	205 km/h (200 km/h) [200 km/h]	223 km/h [215 km/h]	215 km/h (205 km/h) [200 km/h]	[245 km/h]	237 km/h (234 km/h)	
Acceleration, 0–100 km/h (62 mph)	10.0 s (12.0 s) [11.0 s]	8.5 s [9.5 s]	9.5 s (11.5 s)	[6.8 s]	7.8 s (8/.8 s)	
Consumption on 100 km (combinated)	8.2 L S (8.4 L S) [9.0 L S]	7.7–7.9 L S (8.0–8.1 L S) [8.7 L S]		[9.0 L S]	8.8 L S (9.0 L S)	

== Transmissions ==
In addition to the Aisin four-speed automatic transmissions that were available on all models, except the C20LET (although some countries such as Australia did not sell the C20XE with the four-speed auto), there were five manual gearboxes produced by Getrag (all of which were five speed gearboxes, except the six speed F28/6).

- F16CR-5 – Fitted to early 2.0 litre SOHC NA (i.e. C20NE)
- F18CR-5 – Fitted to late 2.0 litre SOHC NA and late 2.0 litre DOHC NA (i.e. C20NE, X20XEV)
- F20 – Fitted to early 2.0 litre DOHC NA (i.e. C20XE)
- F25 – Fitted to 2.5 litre NA (i.e. C25XE, X25XE)
- F28/6 – Fitted to 2.0 litre Turbo (i.e. C20LET)
- AF20 – Fitted to late 2.0 litre SOHC NA and late 2.0 litre DOHC NA (i.e. C20NE, X20XEV) and 2.5 litre NA (i.e. C25XE, X25XE)

The transfer gearbox in the AWD models — the same as used in the Vauxhall Cavalier AWD—was somewhat on the flimsy side, liable to suffer damage from conditions such as minor differences in tyre wear or tyre pressure between front and rear axles. Since front and rear tyres would naturally wear at different rates in normal driving, it was necessary to swap front with rear tyres every 15,000 miles (24,000 km) - recent user recommendations propose 3,000 miles (5,000 km).

All four tyres had to be of the same make and model, and all four tyres had to be replaced at the same time — if one tyre was damaged or punctured, the three remaining good tyres also had to be replaced. In addition there were other maintenance requirements which were both exacting and unusual. Neglect of these points through ignorance or a misconceived attempt to save money was common, and was likely to lead to very expensive failures of the transfer gearbox.

== Dimensions ==
- Length: 4492 mm
- Width (without mirrors): 1688 mm
- Height (empty): 1320 mm
- Wheelbase: 2600 mm
- Track front/rear: 1426/1446 mm
- Tyres: 175/70 R 14 or 195/60 R 14 85 V, 195/60 R 15 or 205/55 R 15 and 205/50 R 16 87 W
- Turning circle: 11,44 m

== Safety and sustainability ==
The Calibra featured four types of recycled materials, used in parts such as the headlight frames, water deflector, bumper attachments, inlet manifold, and fender liners. Waterbased paint and CFC-free air-conditioning were also steps taken for sustainability.

Since the beginning of 1993 all Calibras were delivered with a driver's airbag as standard, and co-driver's full size airbag was added in August. Amongst other small changes during the ongoing development program, other important safety features were added in August 1993: double steel tube strengthening bars in the doors as side crash protection, strengthened door sills, strengthened pillars and roof frame, and seat belt pre-tensioners also became standard for front passengers.

== Motorsport ==
=== Deutsche Tourenwagen Meisterschaft/FIA International Touring Car Championship ===
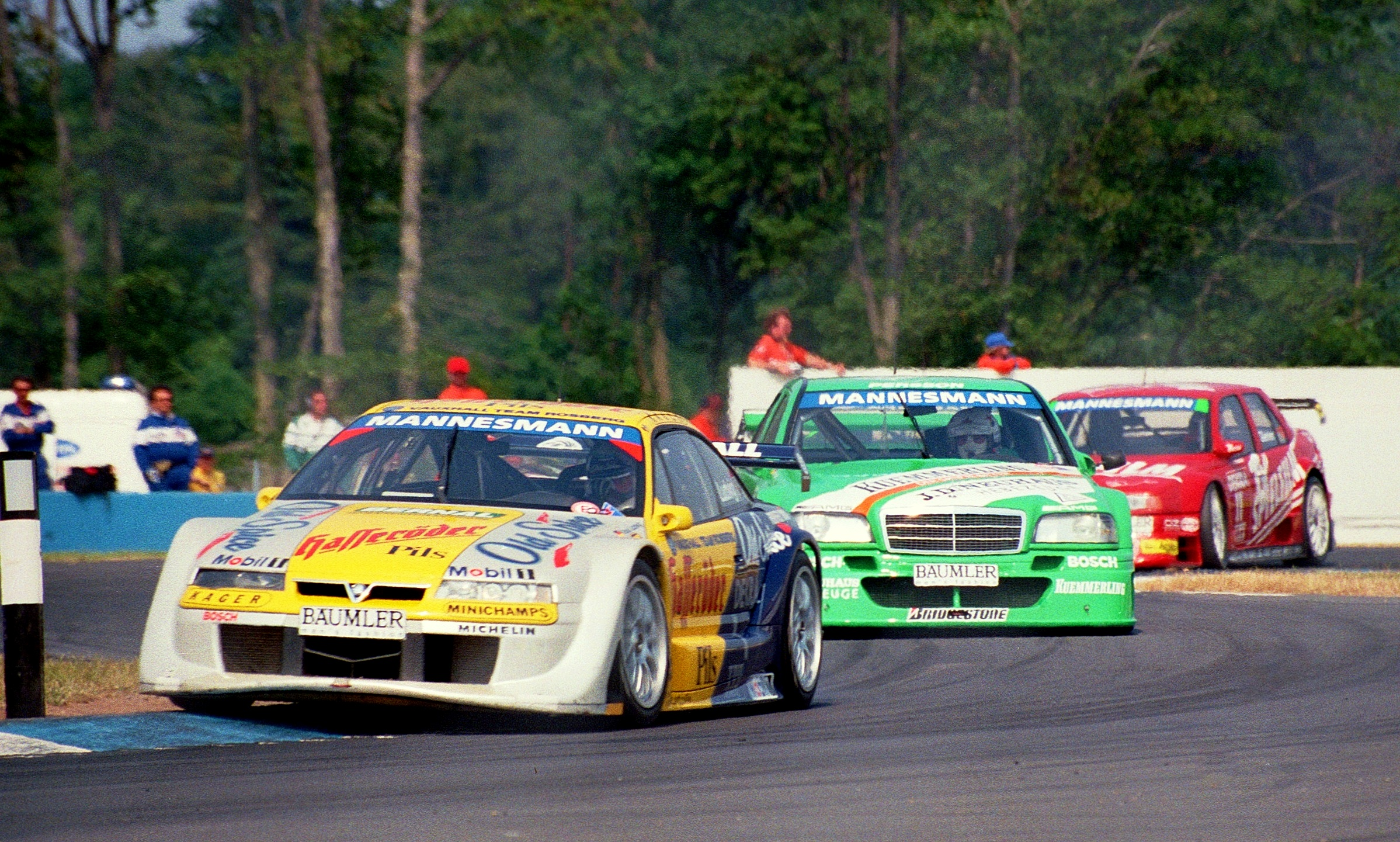
Opel Calibra V6 4x4, Mercedes-Benz AMG C-Class and Alfa Romeo 155 V6 Ti at Donington in 1995

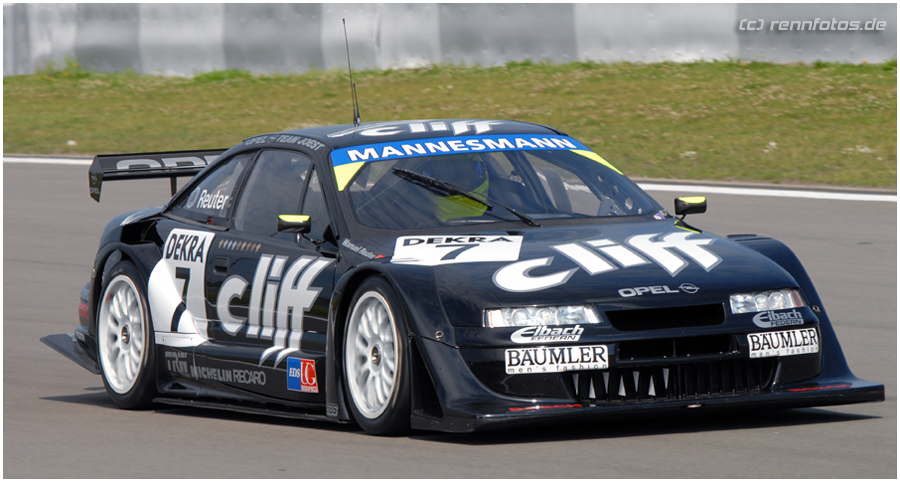
Champions of the 1996 ITC/DTM season: Calibra V6 and Manuel Reuter

The DTM/ITC-specification race cars used an all-wheel-drive layout, with the engine mounted longitudinally instead of transversely. Early DTM cars used a naturally-aspirated Cosworth-developed 54-degree V6 engine based on General Motors' iron block/aluminium head C25XE. Power output improved from 420 to 480 PS (310 to 350 kW; 410 to 470 hp) from 1993 to 1995. Due to changes in the Group A Class 1 FIA regulations for 1996, a switch was made to the all-aluminium, 75-degree Cosworth KF V6 based on the Isuzu 6VD1 (as used in the Trooper/Amigo). Using this engine, Opel won the 1996 ITC Championship. The Isuzu-based KF V6 was capable of revving to 15,000 rpm. The last known KF V6-powered Calibra race car in existence is the Zakspeed Calibra Concept 2 prototype. The car was built to be used as a test mule for the cancelled 1997 FIA ITC championship. While Opel focussed on front-wheel-drive touring cars, AMG-Mercedes quickly developed the Mercedes CLK GTR car for the 1997 FIA GT Championship, winning it.

=== South African Wesbank Modifieds series ===
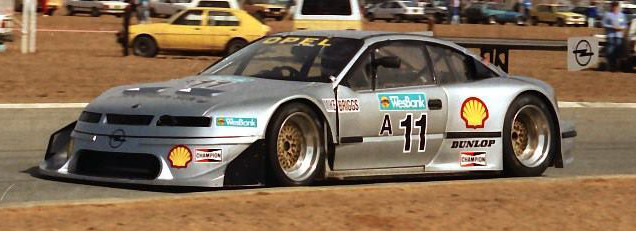
The Wesbank Modified Calibra, driven by Michael Briggs in 1993.

Wanting a car that would be competitive in the Wesbank Modifieds Series (at the time, South Africa's premier circuit-racing series), South Africa's Delta Motor Corporation commissioned a one-off Calibra race car. Owen Ashley Auto Developments, based in Cape Town, was contracted to design and build the car in late 1990, with financial backing from DMC. The car was designed around the then-current Class A rule set (broadly similar to that used in the American IMSA GT series). The car was based around an aluminium honeycomb floorpan, to which was secured a chrome-moly steel spaceframe. DMC's brief to Owen Ashley stated that as much of the standard Calibra silhouette as possible had to be retained. To that end, a standard Calibra roof, side body monocoque pressings, doors and rear window were used. All remaining bodywork was moulded in fibreglass.

The car was powered by a Buick 3800-derived, 3.5-litre all-aluminium odd-fire V6, similar in specification to that used on the IMSA Corvette GTP. Built in the United States by Ryan Falconer, the engine retained its original single-cam, pushrod-and-rocker, two-valves-per-cylinder layout, but employed a Racetronics engine management system and Garrett turbocharger aspirating through a 52mm restrictor plate. The engine produced approximately 600 BHP (447 kW) in race trim. Power was delivered to a rear-mounted five-speed manual Hewland transaxle through a carbon-fibre propeller shaft. Fuel capacity was 40 litres, and double-wishbone suspension was used at both the front and rear ends of the car.

Driven by Michael Briggs, the car was campaigned from 1991 to 1993. A rule change for 1994 that banned turbocharged engines from the series, as well as the rapidly increasing popularity of Group A super touring cars, compelled DMC to retire the Calibra in favour of devoting its motorsport budget and resources to its two-car Astra super touring effort.

=== Rallying ===
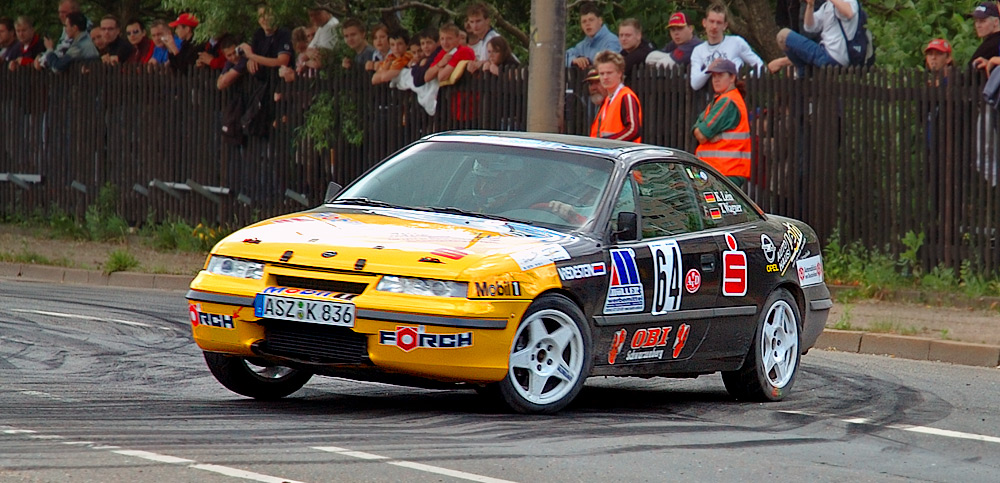
Opel Calibra 4x4 Turbo at Saxon Rally in 2007

The Calibra Turbo was also rallied, albeit without notable success. A Calibra finished ninth in the 1992 Sanremo Rallye, with Bruno Thiry at the wheel. This did make it the fastest car in the 1600 to 2000 cc class.

== 1992 Calibra Cabrio prototypes ==
Although the Calibra's coupé design proved highly successful, there was little market demand for a convertible version. Nevertheless, Opel commissioned Valmet Automotive to develop fully functional Calibra Cabriolet prototypes, as several competitors had begun developing mid-size convertibles. In 1992, Valmet Automotive built two red prototypes, both powered by the 2.0-litre 8-valve engine, while a third bodyshell was produced for structural flexibility testing. However, the cabriolet conversion significantly reduced the practicality of the rear seats and luggage compartment, and the project was not developed beyond the prototype stage. Today, one of the red prototypes is displayed in the concept car section of the underground garage at Opel Classic.

== 1997 Calibra B design study ==
In 1996 Opel began the development of the successor of the Calibra on the basis of the Vectra B, but it didn't fit the international model strategy of General Motors, so the project was dropped. One non-functioning 1:1 scale model from the beginning of 1997 remain, that has been kept hidden for more than twenty years, and revealed for public on the thirtieth anniversary of the Calibra A world premiere. Now the red painted model is exhibited in the underground garage of Opel Classic. As a non-functioning study, it had only a very schematic interior and two different type of headlights (left and right) to test various design solutions at the front.

== 2007 GTC Concept ==
The Opel GTC Concept of March 2007 was linked to the Calibra name, but no production version resulted from the concept car. The GTC concept car was rather a design projection for the first generation of Opel Insignia introduced next year, and especially its most powerful OPC version, which inherited the concept car's large emphasized vertical intakes at the front, similar exhaust tips at the rear and rims on the side. The interior of the first generation Insignia is also very similar to the 2007 GTC Concept. The GTC Concept is showcased in the concept car section of Opel Classic.
