= Getrag F20 transmission =

The Getrag F20 5-speed manual transmission was fitted to many vehicles in the European General Motors production line up including for the UK the Vauxhall Astra DOHC 2.0i GTE 16 valve, Vauxhall Cavalier GSi 2000 16 valve DOHC and Vauxhall Calibra 2.0i 16 valve DOHC. Everywhere else under the Opel brand name the Calibra, Vectra A, Astra F & Kadett E. It was a 5 speed transmission with the following specifications:

Clutch Diameter 9.0 inches (230 mm)
1st Gear Ratio 3.55:1
2nd Gear Ratio 2.16:1
3rd Gear Ratio 1.48:1
4th Gear Ratio 1.13:1
5th Gear Ratio 0.89:1
Reverse Gear Ratio 3.33:1
Final Drive Ratio 3.55:1. 3.42:1 or 3.72:1 found in 4WD F20's.

There are two types of flywheel, depending on the manufacturing year. Kadetts had "Flat" flywheels, which are lighter, while Astras, Vectras and Calibras had "Pot" flywheels, which are heavier to make a more comfortable ride.

The clutch is cable-driven, and has a big fork on the outside-top part of the housing. It has a cover in the bell housing that lets you change the clutch disc without taking off the gearbox. It has a lot of similarities with the Getrag F16 Gearbox, that has a weaker main shaft. It also has a lot of similarities with the Daewoo D16 and D20 Gearboxes.

As an example, the F20 transmission was fitted to the Opel Calibra, Vectra A, Astra F & Kadett E with C20XE 2.0l 16V engines.
