= EDAG =

International corporate group

EDAG Engineering Group AG
- Company type: AG
- Founded: February 1, 1969; 57 years ago in Groß-Zimmern, Germany
- Headquarters: Arbon, Switzerland
- Number of locations: More than 60 (2023)
- Area served: Worldwide
- Key people: Harald Keller (CEO), Holger Merz (CFO), Georg Denoke (VR President)
- Revenue: 822 Million Euro (2025)
- Number of employees: 9100 (2025)
- Divisions: vehicle & smart factory engineering
- Subsidiaries: EDAG Engineering GmbH; EDAG Production Solutions GmbH & Co. KG
- Website: www.edag.com

EDAG Engineering Group AG (short Edag, own spelling EDAG) is an international corporate group active in the Engineering services sector. Since 2015, it has been based in Arbon, Canton Thurgau, Switzerland. The EDAG Group is one of the world's largest independent engineering partners for vehicles and smart factories.

The holding which incorporated the company was founded in Germany during 1969. During 1987, EDAG Group's first overseas branch office was opened in Martorell (Barcelona), Spain. Since incorporation, its structure has been changed several times, including operations as an Aktiengesellschaft, a joint-stock company and a Kommanditgesellschaft auf Aktien. The main operational company of the EDAG Group is EDAG Engineering GmbH, which is based in Wiesbaden, Germany. By November 2018, the company was reportedly operating from 60 sites across 19 countries. It is active in the fields of product development, production plant development, plant engineering, limited series manufacturing, modules, and optimization.

== History ==
On 1 February 1969, the company Eckard Design was founded by Horst Eckard in Groß-Zimmern, outside Darmstadt. The firm's first customer was the car manufacturer Ford at their works in Cologne; the firm's first offices were also established in this city. Before the end of its first year, another customer in the form of local car manufacturer BMW had also been acquired. By the end of 1969, Eckard Design employed a total of eight staff members, some of whom would become key officials of the business for the next 30 years.

During 1970, a new head office was opened in Fulda; the city's central location meant that Eckard Design's headquarters were never more than 300 km away from any of the domestic car manufacturers. Two years later, additional offices in neighbouring Steinau were also secured; that same year, turnover breached DM 2 million for the first time. In 1973, Volkswagen became a customer of the firm, while turnover rose to DM 3.3 million. During the following year, the company was reorganised as Eckard Design GbR; it also completed its first acquisition, that being of the Mücke-based manufacturing company FFT. In 1975, vehicle manufacturer Opel became a client of Eckard Design, while a major order for Karmann was placed during the following year. During the late 1970s, a close working relationship with Audi also developed.

In 1981, company turnover exceeded DM 20 million for the first time; the Fulda office was enlarged during the following year. In 1983, Eckard Design began investing in computer-aided design (CAD) technology in line with clients such as Audi. Headcount reached 250 during 1984, while the firm's offices continued to expand. Since 1986, the firm has also been involved in the construction of prototypes at its own experimental shop in Fulda. One year later, the company launched its first international activities, deciding to open its first overseas branch office in Martorell (Barcelona), Spain. During 1989, its 20th anniversary, turnover breached the DM 100 million milestone; the same year, the company received its first order from Italian luxury car specialist Ferrari.

During the early 1990s, considerable investment was directed into growth into the international automotive market. During 1992, the company's Rechtsform was reorganised, when it became an Aktiengesellschaft and the name Edag Engineering + Design AG came into being. In 1998, EDAG was the first automotive service provider to be admitted to the Verband der Automobilindustrie (English: Association of the German Automotive Industry). During 2004, FFT Flexible Fertigungstechnik GmbH & Co. KG, which is presently called FFT Produktionssysteme GmbH & Co. KG, was integrated into the company. In February 2006, Lutz Helmig, owner of Aton GmbH and founder of the Helios-Kliniken, purchased EDAG from the nine founding families. In 2007, personnel service provider ED Work GmbH & Co. KG was founded.

As a result of the takeover by Aton GmbH, the legal form of the company changed on 11 January 2008 from a joint-stock company to a Kommanditgesellschaft auf Aktien. A further consequence of the re-structuring was that directors Klaus Blickle and Jürgen Böhm left the company on 8 April 2008, and were replaced by long-standing managers Jörg Ohlsen, Manfred Hahl and Rainer Bauer. As a consequence of the merger with Rücker GmbH during early 2014, the executive board was re-structured, while the head office was transferred to Wiesbaden. Since March 2015, EDAG has been operating under the name EDAG Engineering GmbH. With the listing of EDAG Engineering Group AG on the German stock exchange in Frankfurt am Main (Prime Standard), ISIN 0303692047, EDAG Engineering GmbH became part of EDAG Engineering Group AG.

The vast majority of EDAG Group's revenue has typically been derived from its activity in the automotive sector, comprising 62 percent of turnover during 2017; other major contributors to turnover include its electronics businesses, contributing 20 percent that year, as well as a further 18 percent from production solutions activities for that same year. According to market analysts Edison Group, EDAG has been increasingly moving its activities into the international market in recent years; however, it has been facing increasingly intensive competition from rivals on the global stage.

For several decades, EDAG has been active throughout the aerospace sector. During the early 2000s, aircraft manufacturer AvCraft contracted EDAD to produce wing tooling for a new final assembly line at Oberpfaffenhoffen for the Fairchild Dornier 328JET. The company has acted as an intermediate party between various other suppliers and the multinational aerospace conglomerate Airbus.

== Offices ==
The branch offices on five continents are mostly located at important sites of partner industries.

Selection of sites in Germany
Aachen, Eisenach, Fulda, Hamburg, Ingolstadt, Cologne, Leipzig, Munich, Rostock, Ulm, Wolfsburg

Selection of sites in Europe

- Turin – Italy
- Sant'Agata Bolognese – Italy
- Fiorano Modenese – Italy
- Sesto San Giovanni – Italy
- Mladá Boleslav – Czech Republic
- Prague – Czech Republic
- Warwickshire – England
- Győr – Hungary
- Gothenburg -Sweden
- Helmond - Netherlands
- Kocaeli – Turkey

Worldwide

- São Bernardo do Campo (São Paulo) – Brazil
- Troy (Detroit) – United States
- Puebla – Mexico
- Yokohama – Japan
- Seoul - South Korea
- Shah Alam (Kuala Lumpur) – Malaysia
- Pune (Maharashtra) – India
- Shanghai – China

== Automotive industry ==
EDAG is noted for its concept cars such as EDAG Biwak estate concept on the Beetle, the EDAG Pontiac Solstice Hardtop and the EDAG Show Car No. 8 based on Smart mechanicals. EDAG has conducted design work for the application of 3D-printing (additive manufacturing) technology under their "Genesis project", in which Fraunhofer, Laser Zentrum Nord and DMRC Paderborn participated.

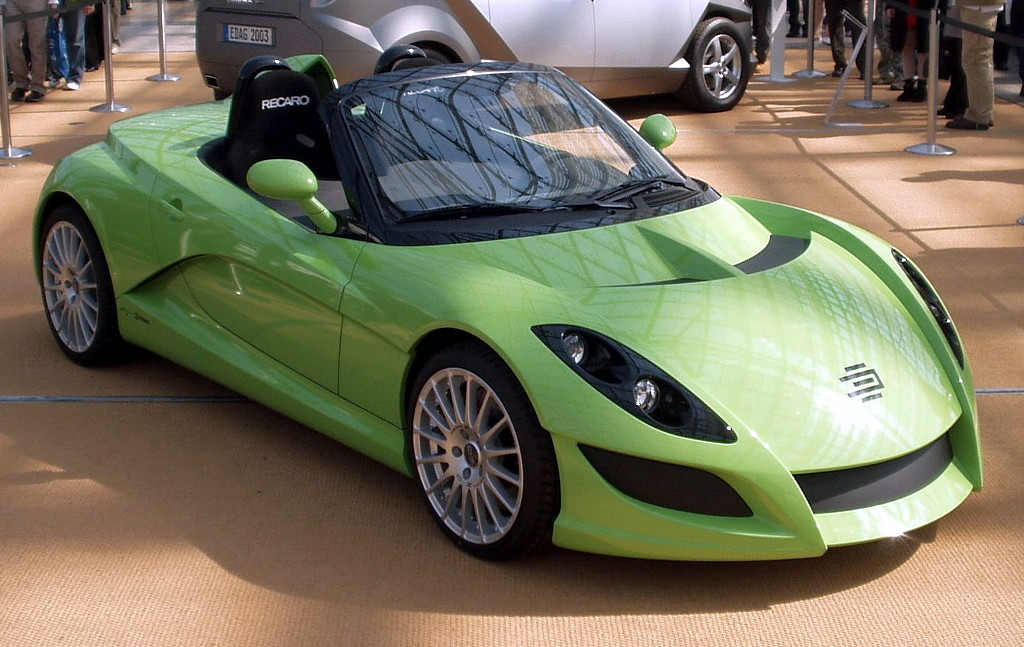
EDAG Show Car No. 8

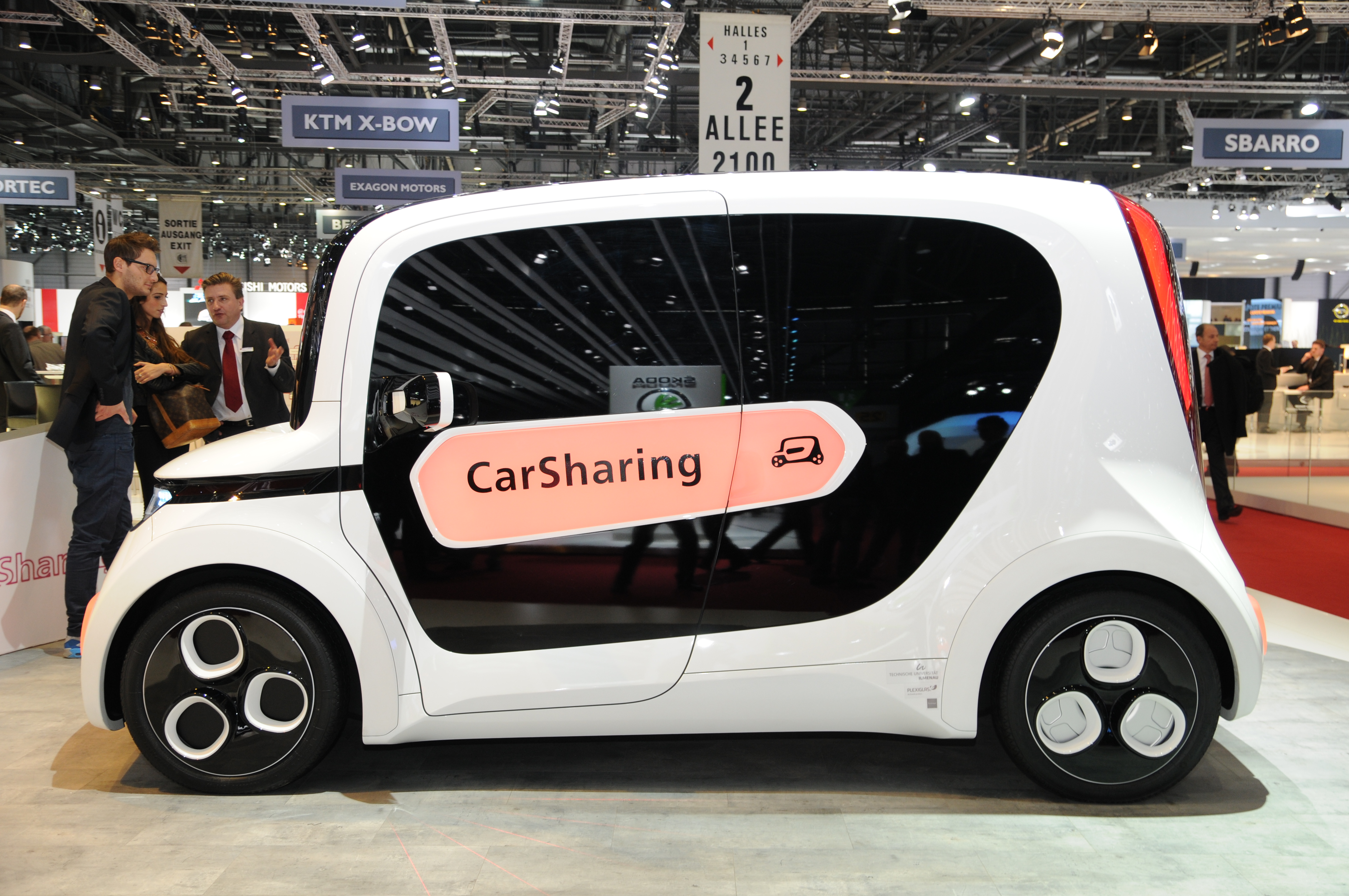
EDAG Light Car Sharing

=== Concept Cars and Prototypes ===
Source: edag.de

- EDAG Scout (1999)
- EDAG 2000 (2000)
- EDAG Keinath GT/C (2001)
- EDAG Keinath GT/C Cabrio (2002)
- EDAG Pontiac Solstice Hardtop
- EDAG Cinema 7D (2003)
- EDAG GenX (2004)
- EDAG/Rinspeed Chopster (2005)
- EDAG Show Car No.8 (2005)
- EDAG Pontiac Solstice Hardtop (2006)
- EDAG Biwak (2006)
- EDAG LUV (2007)
- EDAG Light Car - Open Source (2009)
- EDAG Light Car Sharing (2011)
- EDAG Genesis (2014)
- EDAG Light Cocoon (2015)
