= General Motors J platform =

J-body
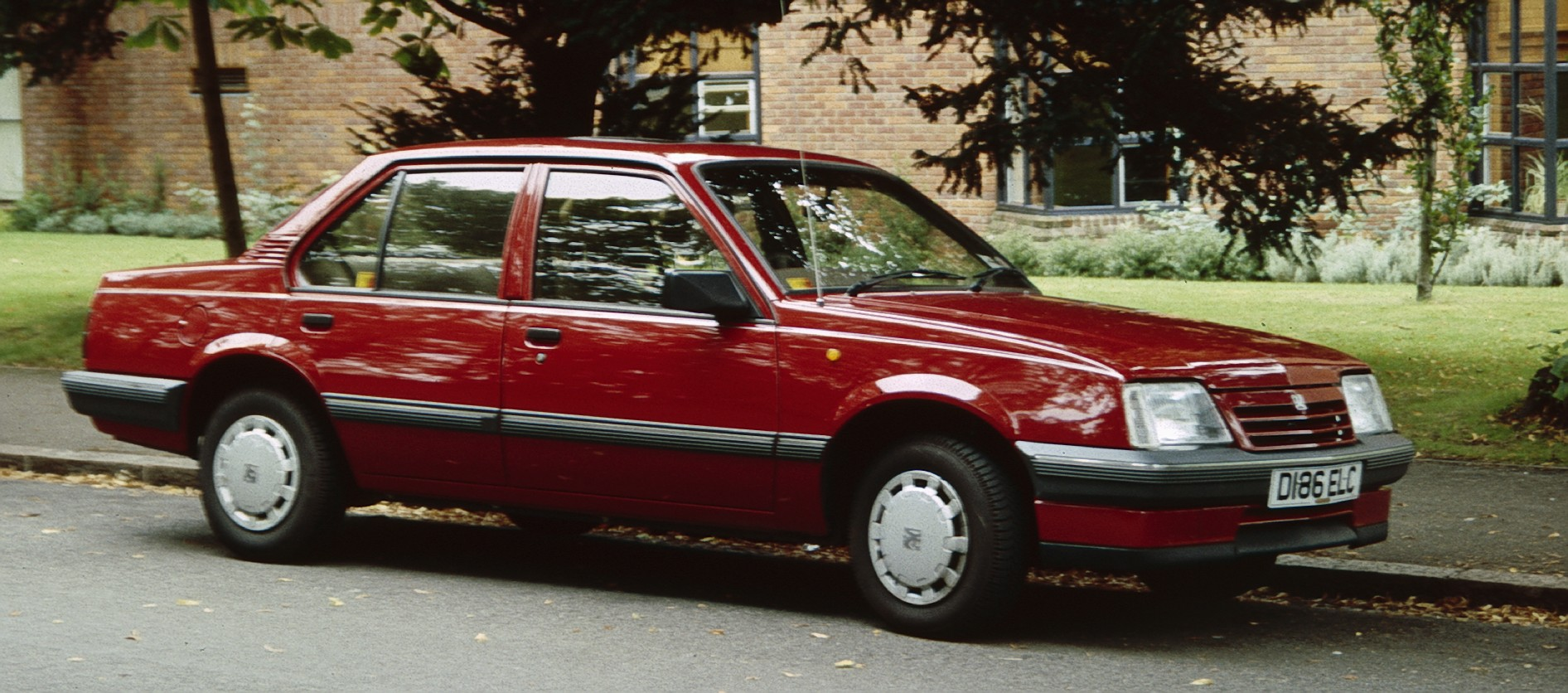
- A 1987 Vauxhall Cavalier, the Vauxhall version of the GM J-body.

Overview
- Manufacturer: General Motors
- Production: 1981–2005

Body and chassis
- Class: Compact (North America); Mid-size (Global)
- Layout: Transverse front-engine, front-wheel drive
- Body styles: 2-door convertible 2-door coupe 2-door notchback sedan 3-door hatchback 4-door sedan 5-door station wagon 5-door hatchback

Chronology
- Predecessor: GM H platform (RWD) (North America)
- Successor: GM2900 platform (Europe); GM Delta (North America)

The General Motors J platform, or J-body, is an automobile platform that was used by General Motors for compact cars from the 1982 to 2005 model years. The third generation of compact cars designed by GM, the J-body marked the introduction of front-wheel drive for its compact model lines, simultaneously replacing the rear-wheel drive H-body and the European U-body platforms, the latter being a stretched version of the original rear-wheel drive T-body. The J-body was marketed as a world car, with GM brands selling versions of the platform in North America, Europe, Australia, and Japan; in markets outside of North America, the model line was packaged as a mid-size car.

Outside North America, the use of the J platform was phased out after the 1980s in favor of the Opel-based GM2900 platform. In North America, the introduction of the Saturn S-Series would lead to the consolidation of the J-body to the Chevrolet and Pontiac brands.

Following several major revisions, the J platform remained in use into the 21st century; in June 2005, the final example (a Pontiac Sunfire) was produced. Introduced by Saturn for 2003, the GM Delta platform is the fourth generation of compact cars from General Motors.

== Background ==
The design of the J-car began in 1976. Originally, the J-car was only intended for the Chevrolet and Pontiac brands, but soon thereafter Oldsmobile and Buick were added. At the time, GM-controlled divisions in different parts of the world manufactured totally different rear-wheel drive C-segment cars – the Chevrolet Vega in America, the Vauxhall Cavalier/Opel Ascona in Europe, the Holden Torana in Australia and the Isuzu Florian in Japan. It was decided that a common replacement would be developed to eliminate duplication of engineering effort and ensure parts interchangeability – a practice known as badge engineering or platform-sharing. In November 1979, subsequent to the second fuel crisis and only 14 months before the car’s introduction, it was decided to create a Cadillac derivative as well. Aside from a hefty price tag, the hastily developed Cimarron had little to distinguish it from the other J-car offerings.

In continental Europe, the car was sold as the Opel Ascona. In Britain, it was known as the Vauxhall Cavalier. Irrespective of badging, European production of the J-body occurred in plants in Germany, Belgium, and Britain. It was generally well received but was narrowly beaten to the European Car of the Year accolade by the Renault 9. The Vauxhall Cavalier version was particularly successful in Britain, where it was the second best selling car in 1984 and 1985 and managed around 800,000 sales across a seven-year production run. At the time, it set new standards for performance and economy in this size of car in Europe; for instance, the 1.6 petrol engined Cavalier for the British market had a top speed of 105 mph, compared to the 101 mph top speed of the 2.0 petrol engined Ford Cortina – its key competitor for a year until the Ford Sierra was launched in 1982. Due to the exterior dimensions, and the engines offered being in compliance with Japanese regulations, the platform was classed in the favorable "compact" designation allowing the Isuzu Aska to compete with other Japanese made products sold in the domestic market at the time. Isuzu also supplied kits for Holden's J-car version, the Camira., whilst correspondingly - Holden manufactured the GM Family II engines installed in J-body cars manufactured worldwide, and also the station wagon bodywork for the Camira was supplied to Vauxhall in the UK for its estate version of the Cavalier II.

The fourth character in the Vehicle Identification Number for a J-body car is "J".

MSRP North America (1982 top trim package sedan before optional equipment)
Model	MSRP
Chevrolet Cavalier CL	$8,137 ($27,147 in 2025 dollars)
Pontiac J2000 LE	$7,548 ($25,182 in 2025 dollars)
Oldsmobile Firenza LX	$8,080 ($26,957 in 2025 dollars)
Buick Skyhawk Limited	$7,931 ($26,459 in 2025 dollars)
Cadillac Cimarron	$12,181 ($40,638 in 2025 dollars)

== Development ==
The platform received two major cosmetic redesigns, in 1988 and a more thorough makeover in 1995, along with major powertrain revisions. The 1995 makeover was only sold in North America, as General Motors subsidiaries in other countries had replaced it (mainly with cars based on the GM2900 platform). This makeover had originally been planned for the 1992 model year when work begain in 1988, but General Motors' bad finances forced them to postpone it twice.

A variety of convertible versions were developed as well, from fully official to purely aftermarket. In all cases, final assembly of convertibles was subcontracted by General Motors; in North America by American Sunroof Corporation (ASC); in Brazil by Envemo and Sulam, and in Europe by Keinath and Hammond & Thiede. Hammond & Thiede's version originated with the Karosseriefabrik Voll, which was taken over by H&T in 1985.

== Models ==
Over its 24-year production run, the GM J platform would be sold under 16 different nameplates (five under the Pontiac brand alone). During the 1980s, a version of the J platform would be marketed by every division of General Motors in North America (with the exception of GMC).

Over 5.8 million of the original (pre-1995 facelift) J-cars were sold in North America. Approximately 10,150,000 GM J platform cars were sold across eleven marques on six continents from 1982 through 1997. Consequently, it is the fifth best selling automobile platform in automotive history.

Vehicle Name	Years Produced	Body Styles	Notes
North American-market nameplates
Buick Skyhawk	1981 (Note: Across all US brands, introduction was in spring 1981 but the launch versions were all advertised as 1982 model year cars.)–1989	2-door sedan 4-door sedan 3-door hatchback 5-door station wagon (1983–1988)	The 1989 Buick Skyhawk would be the last Buick sold with a manual transmission until 2011.
Cadillac Cimarron	1981–1988	4-door sedan	The Cadillac Cimarron shared most of its body panels with the Chevrolet Cavalier, becoming one of the most infamous examples of automotive badge engineering.
Chevrolet Cavalier	1981–2005	2-door sedan 2-door coupe 2-door convertible 4-door sedan 3-door hatchback 5-door station wagon	Longest-produced and best-selling J-body.
Oldsmobile Firenza	1981–1988	2-door sedan 4-door sedan 3-door hatchback 5-door station wagon (1983–88)	The Oldsmobile Firenza is the shortest-produced version of the J-platform in North America.
Pontiac J2000 Pontiac 2000 Pontiac 2000 Sunbird Pontiac Sunbird	1981–1982 (J2000) 1983 (2000) 1984 (2000 Sunbird) 1985–1994 (Sunbird)	2-door sedan 2-door coupe 2-door convertible 4-door sedan 3-door hatchback 5-door station wagon	
Pontiac Sunfire	1994–2005	2-door coupe 2-door convertible 4-door sedan	The Sunfire replaced the Sunbird as part of a major redesign of the J-platform for 1995.
Global-market nameplates
Chevrolet Monza	1982–1996	2-door sedan 4-door sedan 3-door hatchback	Produced in Brazil, the Monza is a version of the Opel Ascona. 3-door hatchbacks have different (more upright) rooflines than the North American versions.
Holden Camira	1982–1989	4-door sedan 5-door station wagon	The body of the Camira station wagon served as the basis for the Vauxhall Cavalier wagon in the UK.
Isuzu Aska	1983–1989	4-door sedan	The Aska was sold as a Chevrolet in South America, and briefly as the Holden JJ Camira in New Zealand.
Opel Ascona C Vauxhall Cavalier Mark II	1981–1988	Opel: 2-door sedan 4-door sedan 5-door hatchback Vauxhall: 2-door sedan 2-door convertible 4-door sedan 5-door hatchback 5-door station wagon	The Ascona/Cavalier are badge-engineered vehicles, with the Opel sold in continental Europe and the Vauxhall sold in Great Britain. Station wagon body panels are derived from the Holden Camira produced in Australia.
Daewoo Espero	1990–1997	4-door sedan	
Toyota Cavalier	1995–2000	2-door coupe 4-door sedan	In a trade agreement between Toyota and GM, the Cavalier was imported into Japan in return for the USDM Geo-division cars for Chevrolet. Toyota Cavaliers are right-hand drive with other detail changes to meet Japanese regulations.

== See also ==
- List of General Motors platforms
