= EDAG Biwak =

Overview
- Manufacturer: Engineering+Design AG
- Production: 2006

Body and chassis
- Class: Compact
- Body style: 2-door estate
- Layout: Front-engine, front-wheel drive
- Platform: Volkswagen Group A5 (PQ35) platform
- Related: Volkswagen New Beetle

Dimensions
- Wheelbase: 2,680 mm (105.5 in)
- Length: 4,405 mm (173.4 in)
- Width: 1,795 mm (70.7 in)
- Height: 1,635 mm (64.4 in)

The EDAG Biwak is an estate concept car from the EDAG (Engineering + Design AG) firm based on the Volkswagen New Beetle. The EDAG Biwak appears as a sport utility vehicle or a two-door estate car with the body of the Volkswagen New Beetle. In the Geneva Auto Show in 2006, it appeared as a concept car.
