= GM2900 platform =

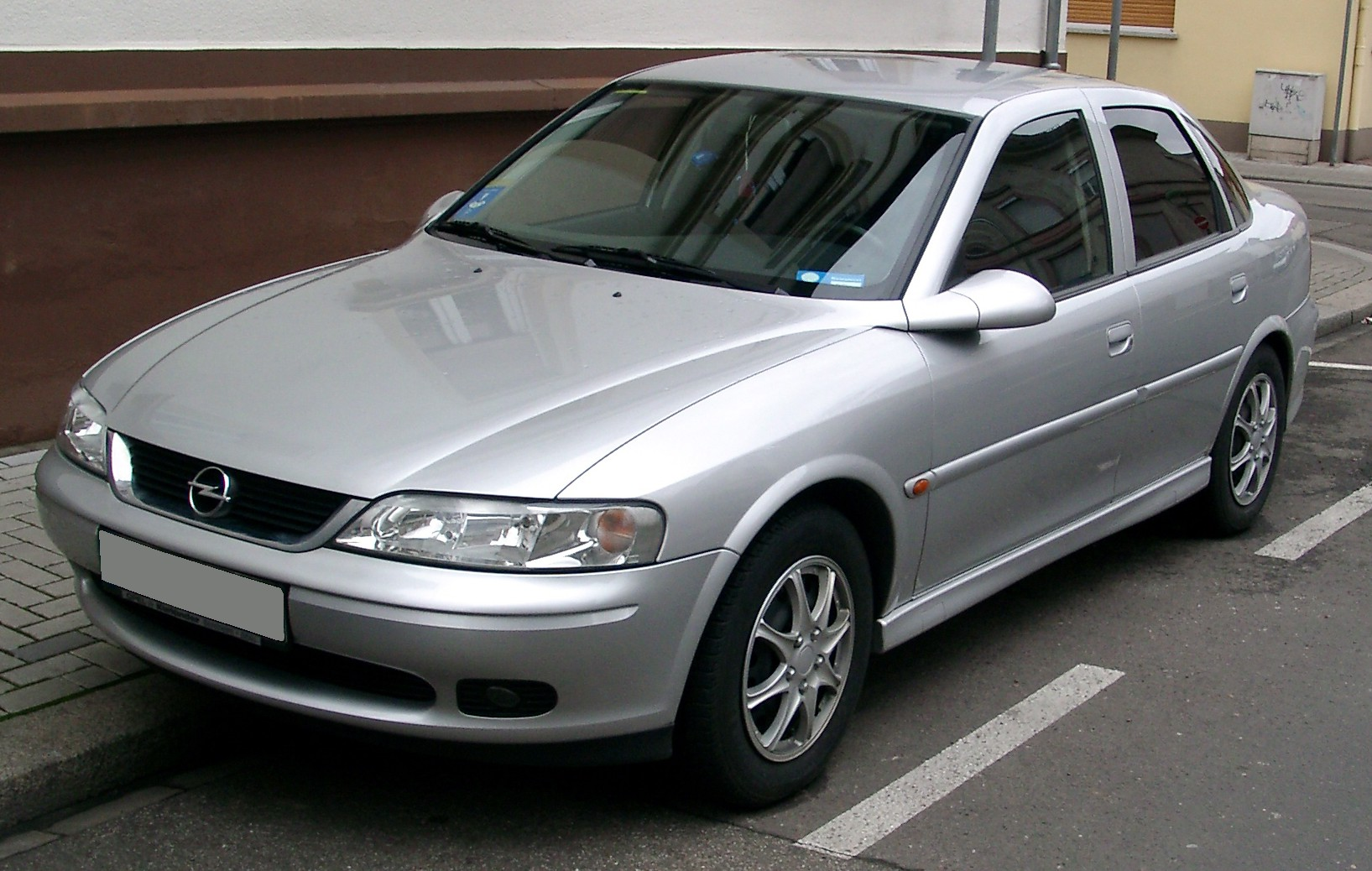

Overview
- Manufacturer: General Motors
- Production: 1988–2010

Body and chassis
- Class: Mid-size (C/D) platform

Chronology
- Predecessor: GM J platform (Europe)
- Successor: GM Epsilon platform

General Motors introduced the mid-size transverse engine front-wheel drive GM2900 platform in 1988 with the introductions of the Opel Vectra A and the Vauxhall Cavalier Mk.3 for the 1989 model year. The platform was intended to replace both division's J-cars, the Opel Ascona C and the Vauxhall Cavalier Mk.2, although the platform eventually branched out to Holden, Chevrolet's Latin American branch, and even Saab and Saturn. The GM2900 platform was replaced by the Epsilon platform in 2003, although Saab continued to use the lengthened GM2902 platform for its 9-5 model until 2010, when it was switched to the Epsilon 2 platform. The tooling for the first generation Saab 9-5 was sold to BAIC and with help from Saab engineers they will develop new models for production under the Senova brand.

== Models ==
- 1993–1996 Chevrolet Vectra A
- 1997–2005 Chevrolet Vectra B
- 1990–1997 Holden Calibra
- 1996–2002 Holden Vectra
- 1990–1997 Opel Calibra
- 1988–1995 Opel Vectra A
- 1995–2002 Opel Vectra B
- 1994–1998 Saab NG900
- 1998–2002 Saab 9-3
- 1997–2009 Saab 9-5
- 2000–2005 Saturn L-Series
- 1990–1997 Vauxhall Calibra
- 1988–1995 Vauxhall Cavalier Mk.3
- 1995–2002 Vauxhall Vectra
- 2012-2016 Senova D70
