= EDAG Cinema 7D =

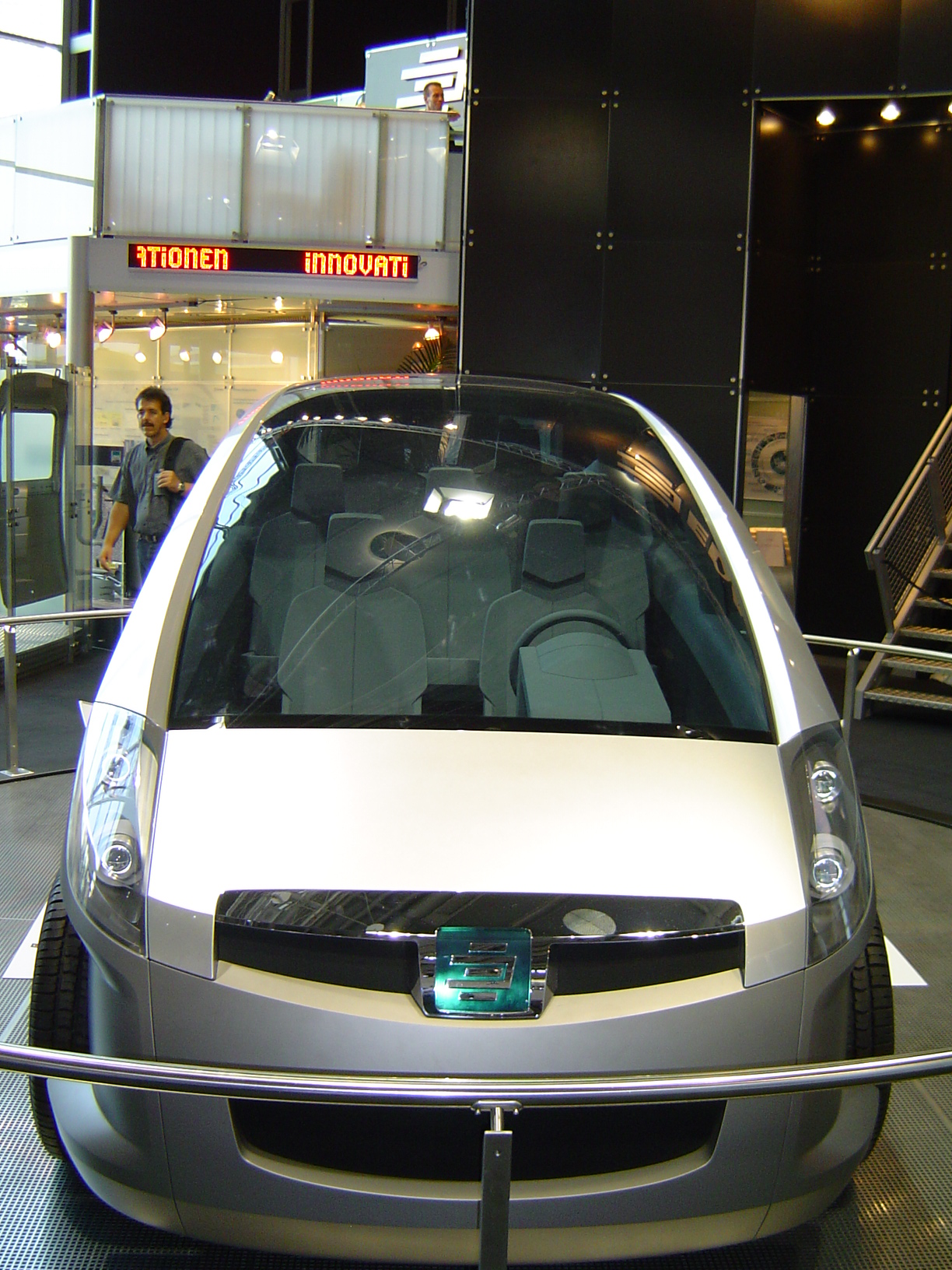

Overview
- Production: 2006-present

Body and chassis
- Class: Subcompact
- Body style: 4-door hatchback
- Layout: Front-engine, front-wheel drive

Dimensions
- Wheelbase: 2,680 mm (105.5 in)
- Length: 4,405 mm (173.4 in)
- Width: 1,795 mm (70.7 in)
- Height: 1,635 mm (64.4 in)

The EDAG Cinema 7D was a four-door hatchback concept car designed by EDAG in 2003.
