= Keinath =

Defunct German car manufacturer

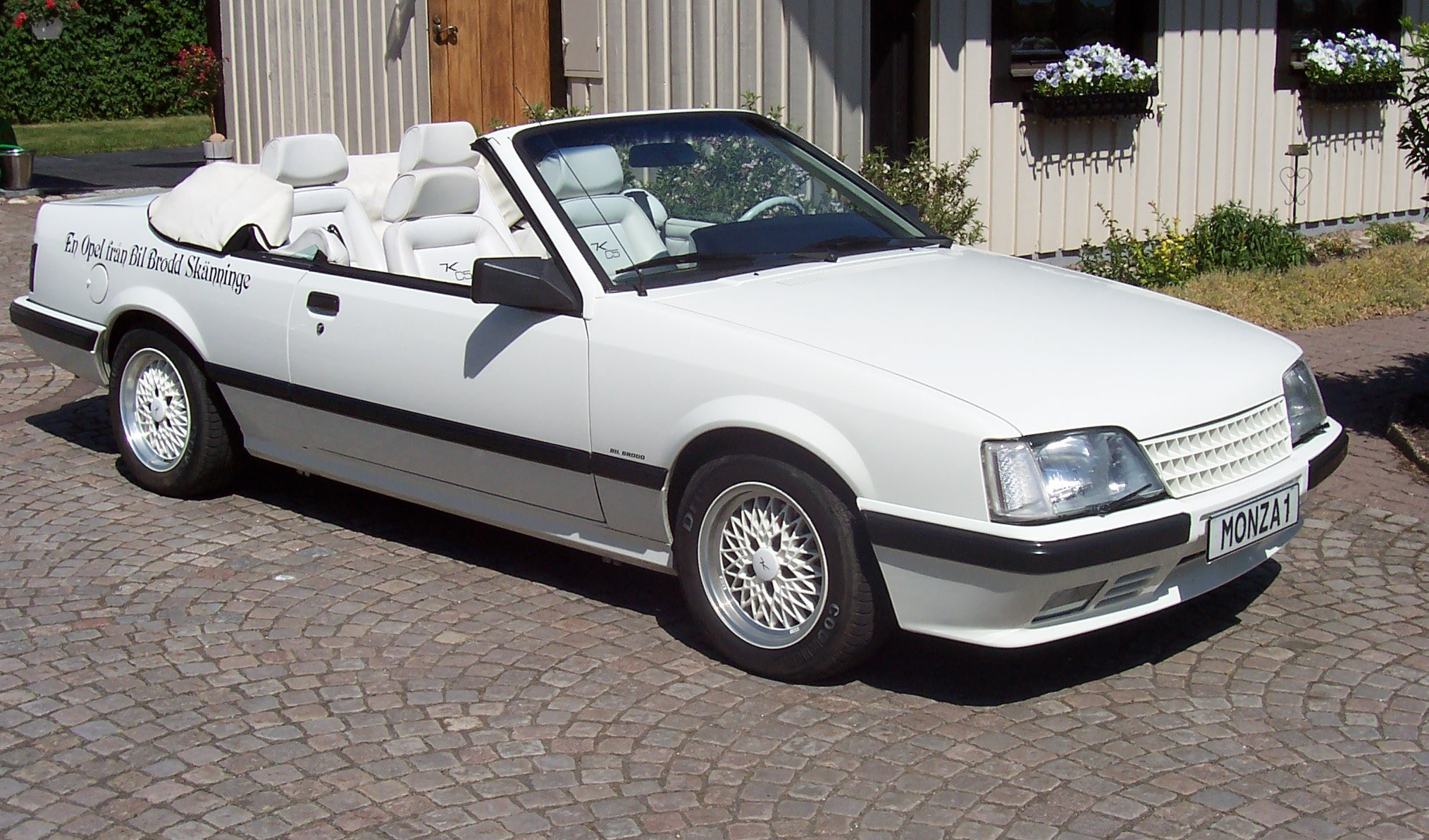
- Opel Monza Convertible by Keinath
- Industry: Car manufacture
- Headquarters: Reutlingen, Germany
- Owner: Horst Keinath

Keinath Automobilbau was a car manufacturer based in Reutlingen, Germany owned and operated by Horst Keinath. The company began by producing a convertible variant of the Opel Monza, and the Vauxhall Cavalier Mark 2. Along with Hammond & Thiede and Voll, Keinath produced their convertible version of the Opel Ascona (badged C3) from 1983 to 1988.

== Recent activities ==
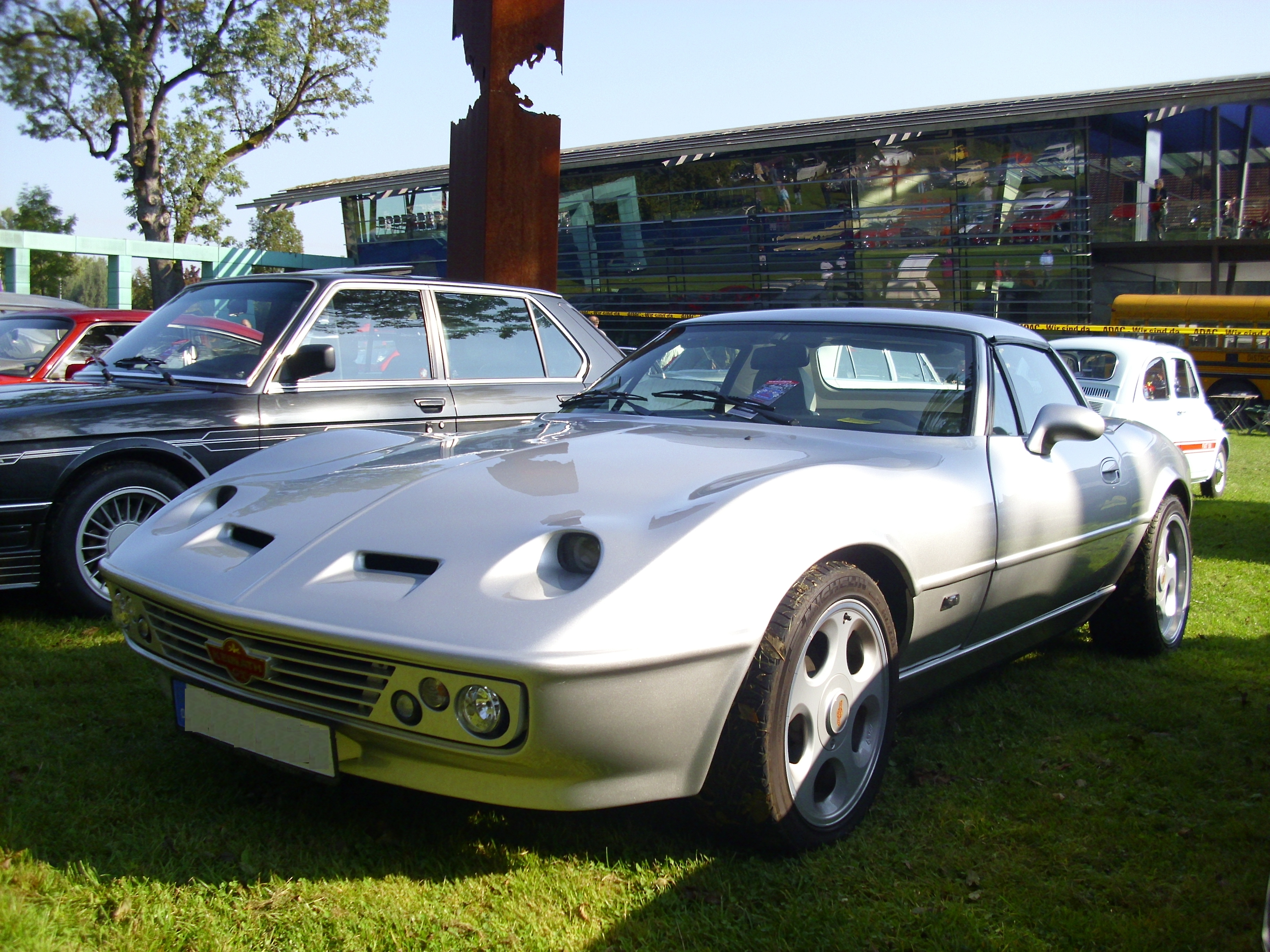
Keinath GTR

In 1996, Keinath made a presentation of his first original model, the GTR. The car has a convertible-coupe body with a hard roof that is stored in the trunk. Limited-series production began in 1997, with a choice of 2.0-litre, 2.5-litre, or 3.0-litre Opel engines. In 2000, a GTR car was shown in Geneva equipped with a 5.7-litre LS family V8 engine, similar to the powerplant used in the Chevrolet Corvette.

In 2003, Keinath planned production of a new model named the GT/C. It was a 2-door sports car available as a coupé (presented in 2001) or a convertible (prototype in 2002). The GT/C was powered by a 3.2-litre V6 engine that produced 218 PS (160 kW) and had a top speed of 250 km/h (155 mph).
