= Vauxhall Cavalier =

Car model

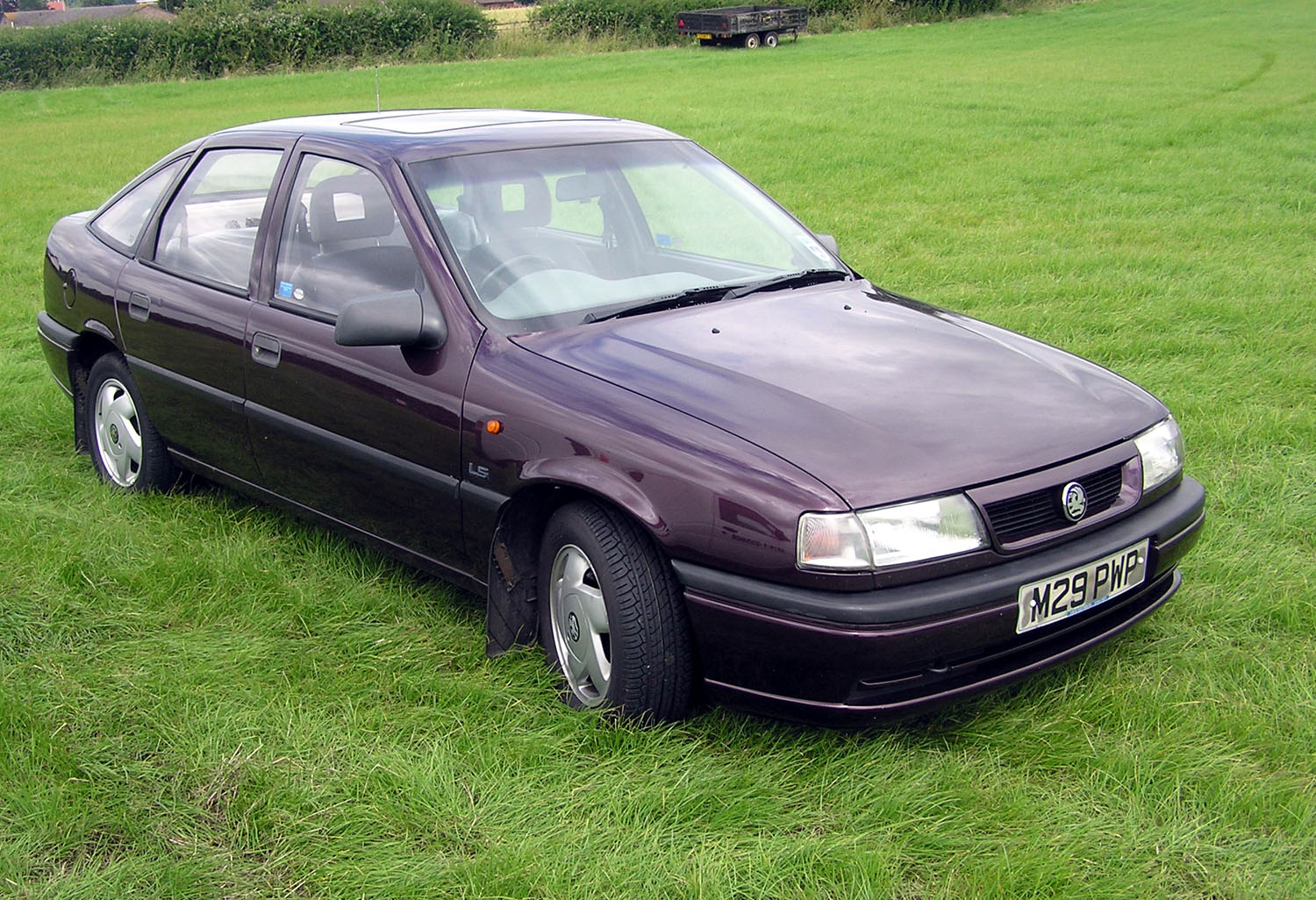
- 1994 Vauxhall Cavalier LS

Overview
- Manufacturer: Vauxhall (General Motors)
- Also called: Opel Ascona B (Mk1); Opel Ascona C (Mk2); Opel Vectra A (Mk3)
- Production: 1975–1995

Body and chassis
- Class: Large family car
- Layout: FR layout (1975–1981); Transverse front-engine, front-wheel drive (1981–1995); AWD (1988–1995)

Chronology
- Successor: Vauxhall Vectra

The Vauxhall Cavalier is a large family car that was sold primarily in the United Kingdom by Vauxhall from 1975 to 1995. It was based on a succession of Opel designs throughout its production life, during which it was built in three incarnations. The first generation of Cavalier, launched in 1975 and produced until 1981, was Vauxhall's version of the General Motors 'U-Car' — essentially an Opel Ascona B/Opel Manta with a few minor visual differences.

The second generation of Cavalier, launched in 1981 and produced until 1988, was launched simultaneously with the identical new generation of Opel Ascona, which was sold across the world in various guises on the GM "J-Body platform". The third and final generation of Cavalier, launched in 1988 and produced until 1995, was a rebadged Opel Vectra A with the same production span. Cavaliers for the UK market were predominantly built at Vauxhall's Luton plant, but were also built alongside their Ascona/Vectra sister models at Opel plants in Continental Europe.

== Mark I (1975–1981) ==
Cavalier Mark I
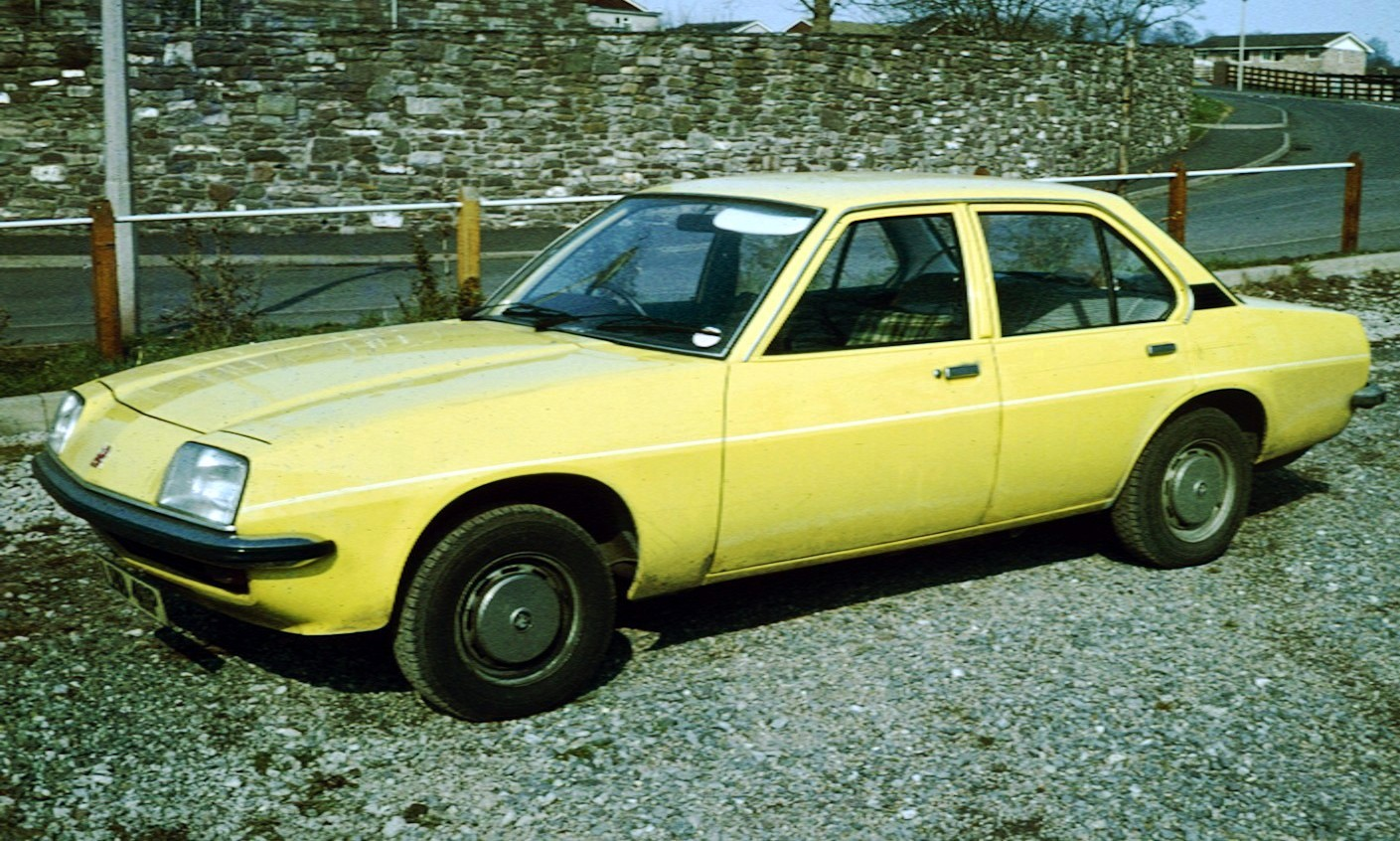

Overview
- Also called: Chevrolet Chevair (RSA)
- Production: November 1975 – September 1981
- Assembly: Luton, United Kingdom; Antwerp, Belgium; Bochum, West Germany; Port Elizabeth, South Africa (Chevrolet Chevair)

Body and chassis
- Body style: 2-door coupé 2-door saloon 4-door saloon 3-door hatchback
- Layout: FR layout
- Related: Opel Ascona B Opel Manta B

Powertrain
- Engine: 1256 cc OHV I4; 1584 cc Opel CIH I4; 1896 cc Opel CIH I4; 1979 cc Opel CIH I4
- Transmission: 4-speed manual 3-speed automatic

Dimensions
- Length: 175 in (4,445 mm)
- Width: 65 in (1,651 mm)
- Height: 54.5 in (1,384 mm)

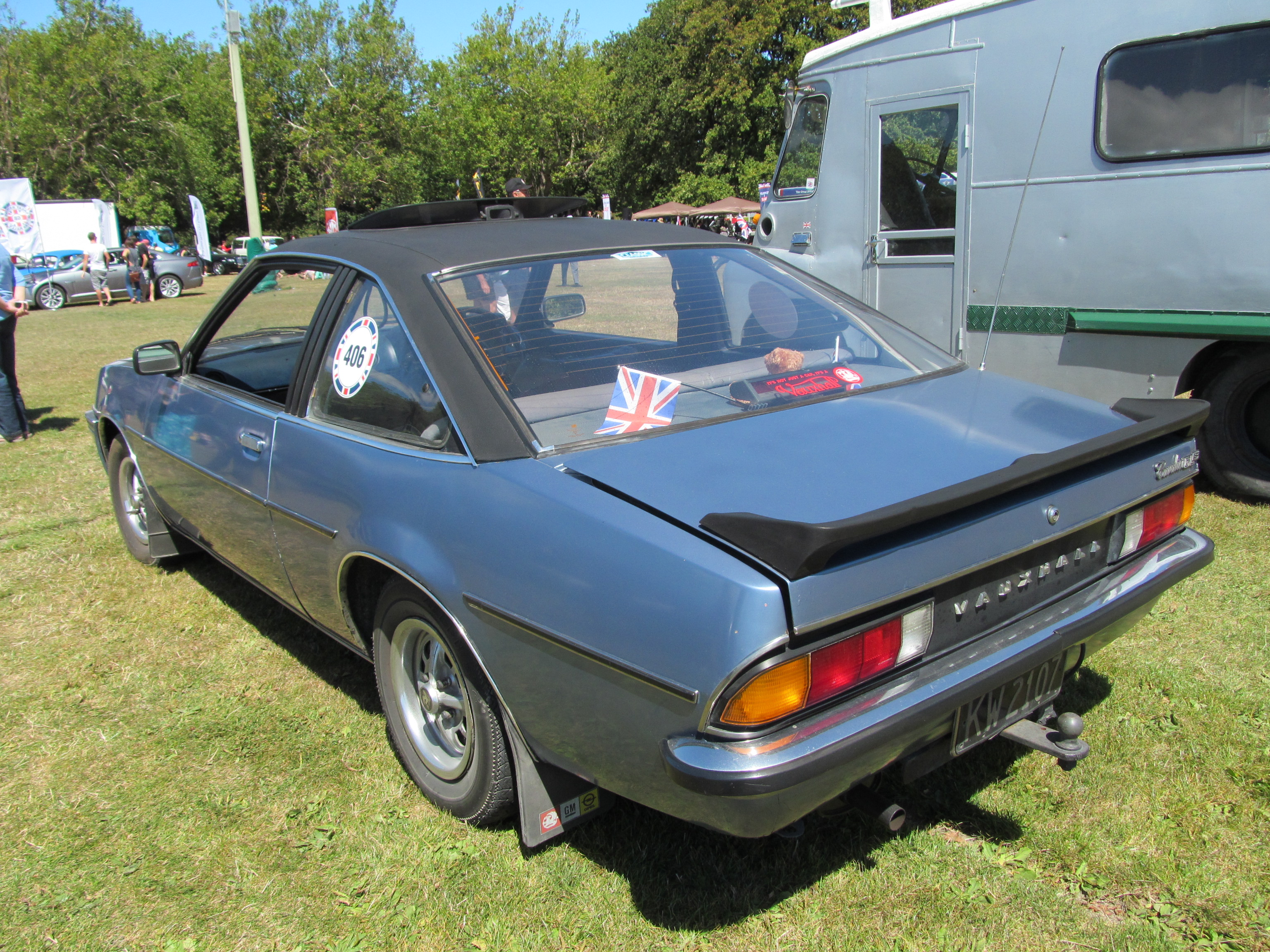
Vauxhall Cavalier GLS Coupé rear

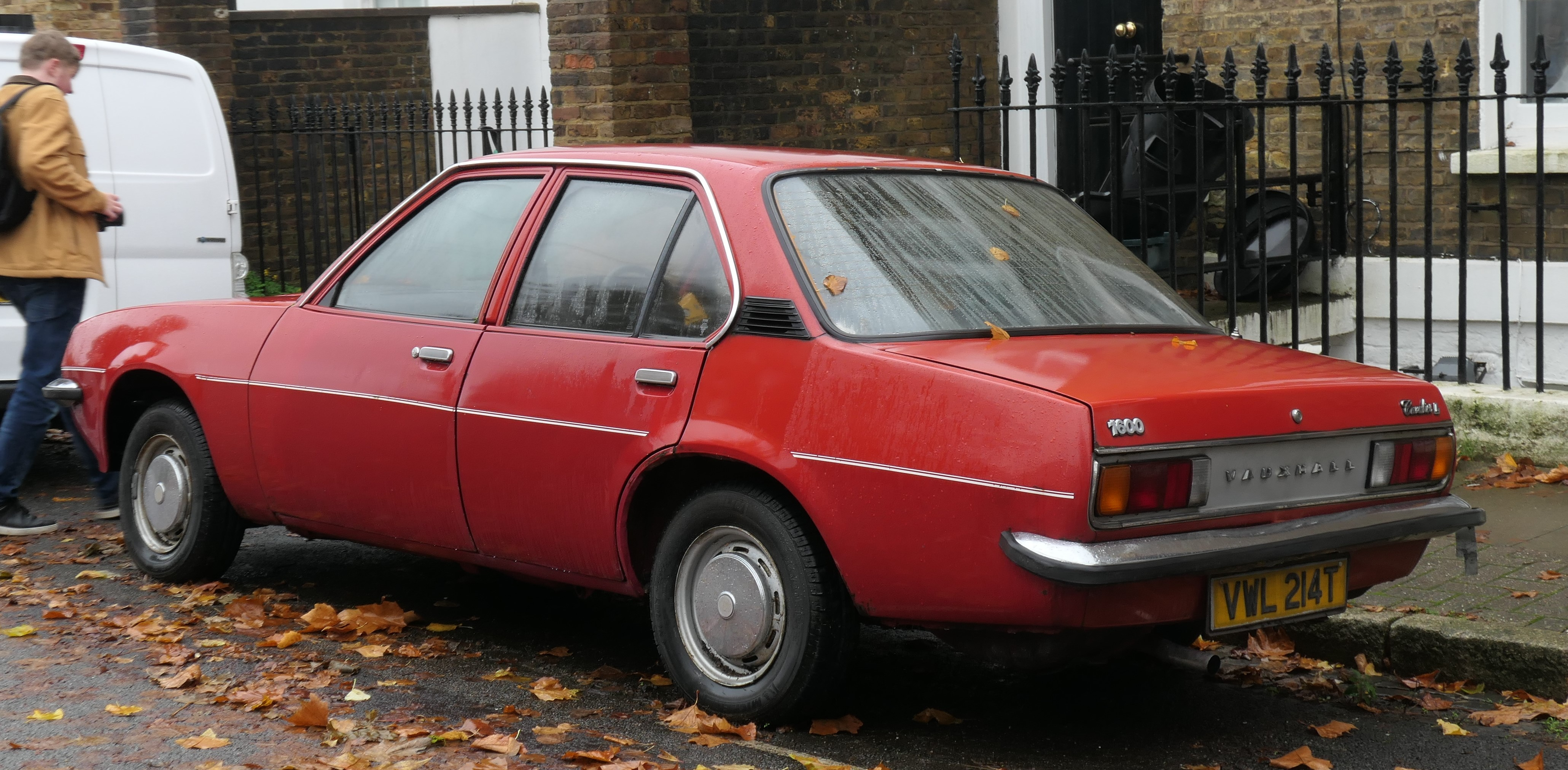
Vauxhall Cavalier L Saloon rear

Launched with a 1,896 cc engine as a 1976 model in November 1975, the Cavalier was a restyled version of the Opel Ascona B which had debuted three months earlier in West Germany. The Ascona/Cavalier was built on what GM called the U-car platform — which was essentially a stretched version of the T-body used in the smaller Kadett C/Chevette. The Cavalier was originally intended to have its own bodywork and interior design. However, GM management stopped its development six months away from the car's intended release and decreed that it used the Opel Ascona body and interior almost unaltered, but with the longer hood and "droopsnoot" nose from the Manta B, albeit without the air slots between the headlamps, whilst the rear fascia would be altered with the license plate moved below the bumper and an applique panel between the rear lamps with "VAUXHALL" spelled out in large letters similar to existing models. In the end to keep costs down, the different nose, designed by Wayne Cherry, was the only obvious styling feature to set the Vauxhall apart., with the interior also having no differences from the Opel sister car except for badging and trim. The new models bore a strong visual resemblance to the 1973 OSV (Opel Safety Vehicle) project which had been seen in West Germany two years before.

Van, pick-up and estate versions were also on the drawing board, but the MK1 Cavalier was ultimately never produced in these body styles. In the meantime, estate versions of the smaller Chevette and Astra, as well as the larger Carlton, would be launched to compensate for the lack of a Cavalier estate. To begin with, the Mark I Cavalier was produced principally alongside the Ascona at the newly refurbished Opel plant in Antwerp, Belgium.

Shortly after its launch, the Cavalier was tested by What Car? magazine and received a much higher rating than the Ford Cortina Mk III and Morris Marina against which it was tested. However, the Cortina was less than a year away from replacement, and January 1976 saw the arrival of the Chrysler Alpine (the British version of the Simca 1307, which had recently been voted European Car of the Year). In Britain, demand for the Cavalier initially outstripped supply, one of the factors in General Motors making a decision soon afterwards to add the Cavalier to its British as well as continental production lines in August 1977.

The first Vauxhall Cavalier to be assembled at Vauxhall's Luton plant was driven off the production line by Eric Fountain, Vauxhall's manufacturing director, on 26 August 1977, after which the 1256 cc version, assembled at Luton and using engine and transmission already familiar to Viva 1300 owners, broadened the range. At that stage the 1584 cc Cavalier and the 1979 cc which had joined it were still being imported from Belgium, but in due course these, too, started to emerge from the Luton production plant. The commencement of Cavalier production in the UK also helped ensure that supply for the car met demand, and consequently its sales figures increased so it was now a constant presence in the top 10 best selling cars in Britain.

The timing of the Cavalier's United Kingdom launch was well-judged. The United Kingdom tax system meant that sales to company car fleets comprised a larger proportion of the overall market – especially for middle-weight saloons — than elsewhere in Europe: the Ford Cortina Mk II had been replaced by the Ford Cortina Mk III in 1970, but in the eyes of the all-important company car fleet managers the newer Cortina never quite matched the earlier car for reliability, notably in respect of problems with its cable clutch and with camshaft wear in the 1.6 and 2.0 litre ohc units. The traditionally very conservative fleet market was therefore particularly receptive to Vauxhall's new Cortina challenger. At the time, British Leyland was facing criticism for the lacklustre design and doubts about build quality and reliability surrounding its cars, especially the Morris Marina and the smaller Austin Allegro. The Cavalier was launched around the same time as Chrysler's Alpine, which featured a more modern front-wheel drive hatchback layout and was voted European Car of the Year for 1976, but it would ultimately fail to meet sales expectations on the British market and was not reputedly a reliable or well-built car.

The original Cavaliers were available as two and four-door saloons, and with a two-door booted (three-box) coupé body as used for the Opel Manta. The cars came with a choice of 1.6 and 1.9 L inline-four cylinder Opel CIH engines in the saloon: only the 1.9 L engine was available in the coupé. Vauxhall engineers built Cavalier prototypes using the 2.3 L Vauxhall Slant-4 engine, for use in a future high-performance variant, but the proposals did not get past GM Europe management, and as a result the larger-engined Cavaliers were exclusively powered by the Opel CIH engine.

It was revised in 1978, as the 1.9 L became a 2.0 L engine and the 1.3 L OHV engine from the Vauxhall Viva and Vauxhall Chevette was used to create the entry-level Cavalier 1.3 variant. At the same time, a three-door hatchback known as the Sports hatch (also seen on the Manta) was added to the range.

There were plans for a five-door hatchback version to be launched, but this bodystyle was never produced on the first generation Cavalier, although at this time hatchbacks still only accounted for a small percentage of sales on larger family cars. That would change during the 1980s, however.

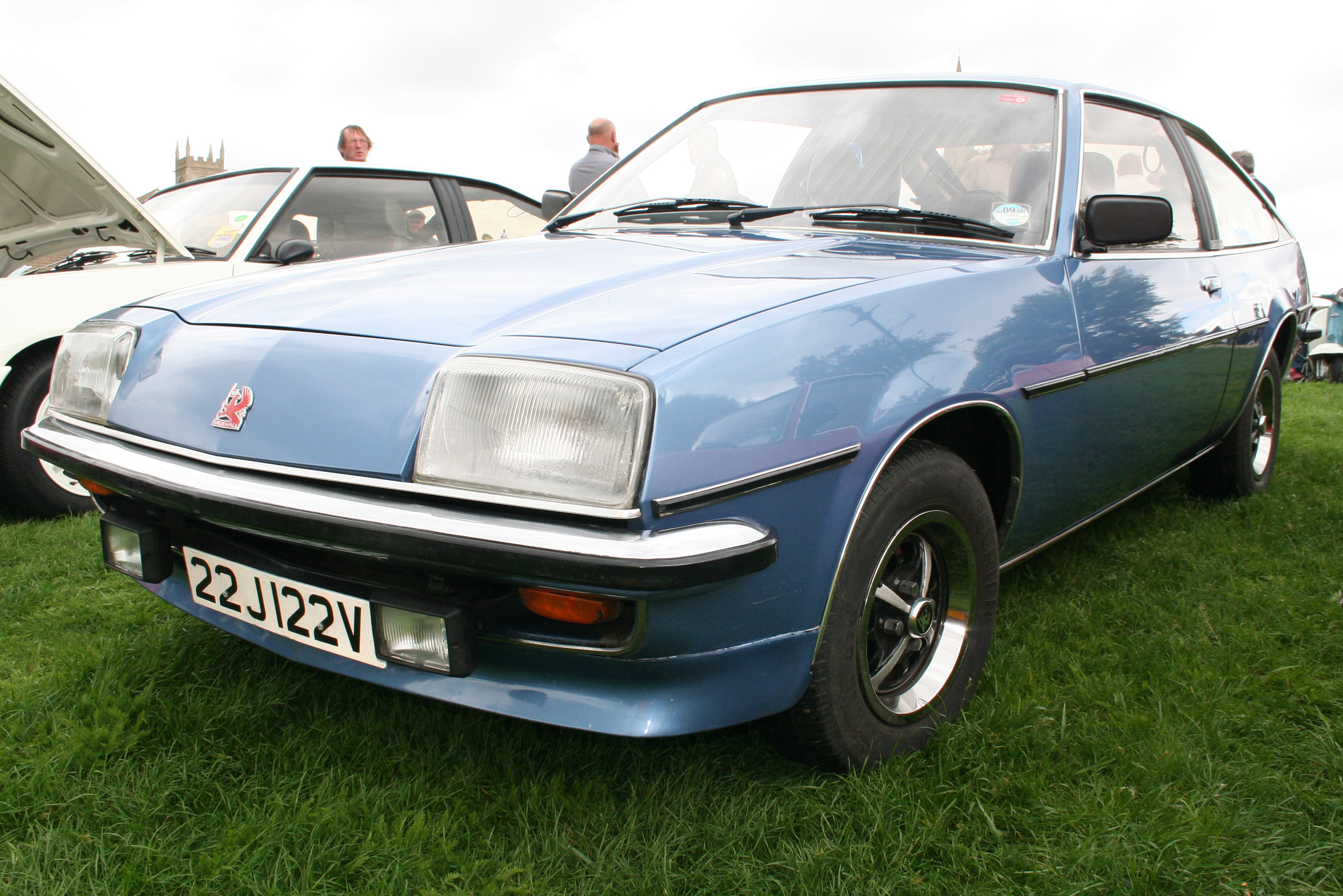
Vauxhall Cavalier Sports hatch (Opel Manta B)

All Cavalier saloons shared most of their bodywork with the Opel Ascona but had the slanted nose of the Manta to give them the distinct "droop snoot" front end. The coupé also had a front air dam.

Despite being the same car mechanically, the Opel Ascona was sold alongside the Cavalier in the United Kingdom until 24 July 1981, when GM decided to phase out duplicated models with the Opel brand in the United Kingdom and merge remaining dealerships with those of Vauxhall. The Opel Manta (and Monza) remained available, giving the Opel brand a "sports" position in Britain until the Manta was finally discontinued in 1988.

That the Manta was sold alongside the MK2 Cavalier in the 1980s gave rise to the curiosity that the previous generation Ascona/Cavalier was effectively being sold concurrently with its successor, since a coupé/sports hatch version of the Ascona C/Cavalier Mark 2 was never engineered. However, the early to mid 1980s saw the decline of coupé models on the British market, with British Leyland not replacing the MG B when it closed the famous MG factory at Abingdon in 1980, and even the Ford Capri (a top-ten seller in Britain as late as 1980) had no immediate successor after the end of production in 1986, as Ford felt that there was not sufficient demand in Europe for a new sporting coupé to be launched. This was largely due to the rising popularity of "hot hatchbacks" and sports saloons including the Volkswagen Golf GTI.

Vauxhall, from 1978 until 1979, offered the Cavalier Coupé in a convertible format called the Centaur. A total of 118 of these were made, and fewer than 30 were believed to have survived by 2007. The cars were developed by Magraw Engineering and sold through Vauxhall dealerships on behalf of Crayford. The Centaur is basically a Cavalier GLS Coupé 2-litre with the hard roof replaced with a soft top leaving a T-bar for strength. The floor pan was also strengthened.

The Silver Aero, Wayne Cherry's design concept, is often considered the ultimate Cavalier Mark I. This was a one-off prototype built in 1980, based on the Cavalier Sportshatch. The car was displayed at the International Car Show at the NEC in October 1980. The plan was to offer existing Sportshatch owners and buyers to upgrade their car to the Silver Aero spec. The car has a 2.4-litre turbocharged engine which produces 150 bhp (112 kW; 152 PS). Orders were taken, but not enough to warrant production, and the car remained a one-off.

The original Cavalier was a relatively strong seller in Britain, even though it never quite matched the runaway sales success of the Ford Cortina, or even the sales figures attained by British Leyland's Morris Marina (which sold well throughout the 1970s despite being widely condemned in the motoring press) but it at least managed to help Vauxhall regain lost ground in a market sector where it had declined during the first half of the 1970s as Victor sales slumped. It also helped repair Vauxhall's image, which had been hit hard in the early 1970s by build quality and reliability issues surrounding cars like the Victor. Nearly 250,000 were sold, though by December 2009 just 373 remained.

The Vauxhall Cavalier MK1 was also sold with left-hand drive in some European countries, including Denmark, Netherlands, Belgium, Norway, Italy, Sweden, Finland and Switzerland, alongside its Opel equivalent. The coupé was available with the 1.3 engine and in Scandinavia the car came with Manta-style headlight wipers. Vauxhalls were at one time sold alongside Opels in Europe (mostly in countries where memories of the German occupation brought about resistance to German cars) but Vauxhall announced they were pulling out of the 11 other countries where they sold cars on 6 December 1979 and export sales stopped entirely in 1981, allowing General Motors to concentrate on the Opel brand in these markets.

In RHD markets such as Ireland, Cyprus and Malta, the Vauxhall brand was also dropped, with Opel becoming the main GM marque. Holden also looked at taking the U-Car but they declined as they found that the prototypes they had tested were not suitable for the roads in the outback without extensive modifications.

Trim levels:

- L
- LS
- GL
- GLS

Special Edition:

- Command Performance
- Silver Special

The higher-end models of the range featured an upgraded dashboard with tachometer, four-spoke steering wheel and Rostyle wheels.

=== Chevrolet Chevair ===
The Chevrolet Chevair in South Africa was a variant of the Cavalier/Ascona, featuring the grille of the Opel Manta and a four-door body. The engine choices were different, consisting of a 2.0 and a 2.3 litre pushrod four. (These were both versions of Chevrolet's 2.5-litre four). Outputs were 56.7 and 63.4 kW (77 and 86 PS; 76 and 85 hp) respectively, with the bigger engine being considered much smoother running. A later (1978) version with the Ascona front was sold as the "Chevrolet Ascona", with Vauxhall's 1.3 litre engine from the Viva. The Chevair was first introduced in November 1976. The 2.0 was called De Luxe and the 2.3 received the GL moniker. Both models were available with a four-speed manual or a three-speed automatic, with the better equipped GL being recognizable by having headrests, Rostyle wheels, and chrome trim bordering the wheel wells. During 1978 a more luxurious Berlina version arrived, available only with the automatic transmission. It received new "mag-style" wheels, tinted windows, velour upholstery, and a twin exhaust tip. By July 1978 the outputs were quoted in ISO ratings; this meant that the stated power dropped from 77.5 to 63 kW (105 to 86 PS) for the 2.3, while the 2.0 was no longer listed.

In early 1980 an updated variant was introduced. The De Luxe was dropped. The 1980 model can be recognized by a new grille with somewhat larger openings, new wheels, and new wraparound bumpers in black plastic. Chevrolet badges were removed from the car, as GM South Africa were phasing out the Chevrolet name in the country. The Chevair was replaced by the front-wheel drive Opel Ascona in South Africa in 1983.

GM South Africa also rallied the Chevair in the South African championships. A Group 1 car with a tuned 2.5-litre version of the Chevrolet engine, as well as a Group 2 car with a Lotusesque DOHC 16-valve Vauxhall 2.3-litre engine were campaigned. They developed 90 and 175 kW (122 and 238 PS) respectively. A Chevair driven by Tony Pond won the 1979 Duckhams Rally. Despite a further victory in 1979 they could not threaten the Ford Escorts nor the Datsuns in the overall championship.

== Mark II (1981–1988) ==
Cavalier Mark II
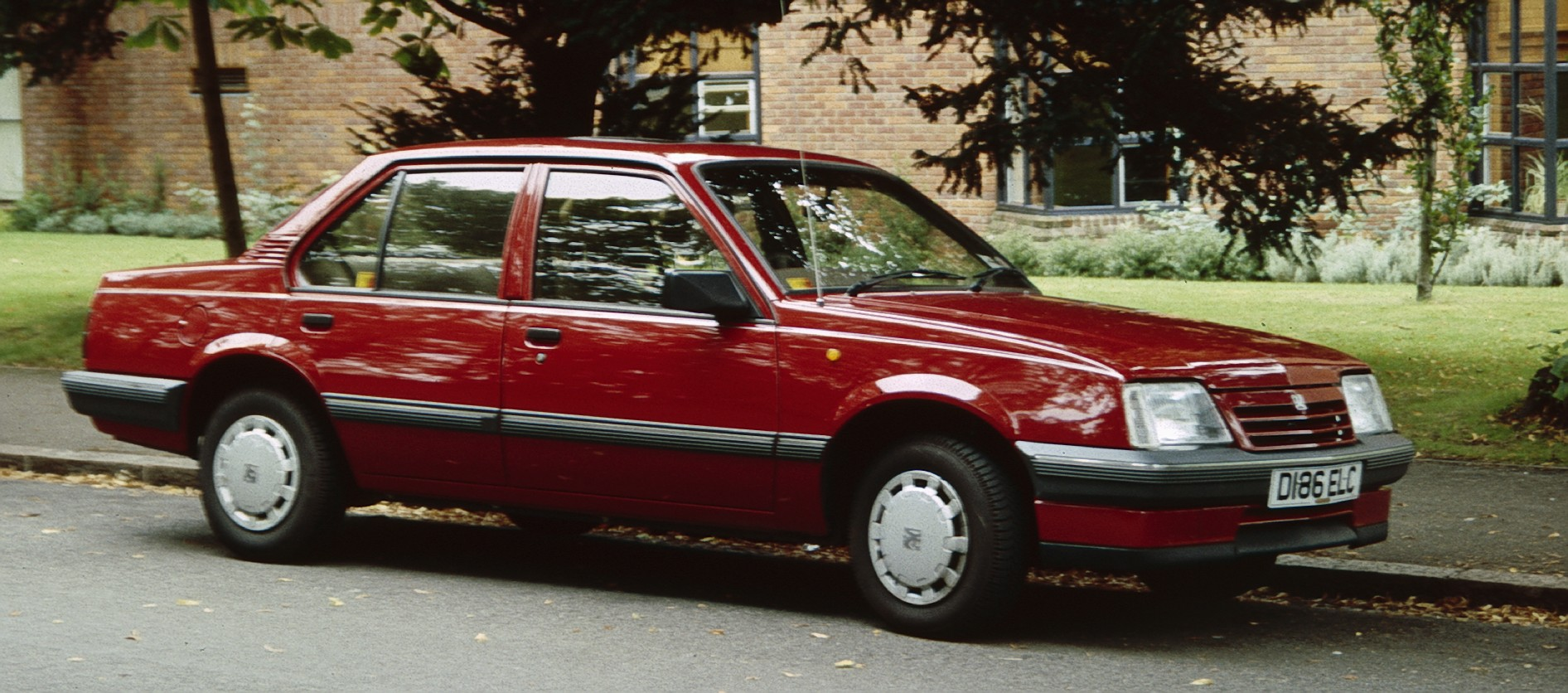
- 4-door saloon (2nd facelift)

Overview
- Production: August 1981 – October 1988; March 1983 – September 1996 (Brazil)

Body and chassis
- Body style: 2-door convertible 2-door saloon 4-door saloon 5-door estate 5-door hatchback
- Layout: Transverse front-engine, front-wheel drive
- Platform: J-body
- Related: Chevrolet Cavalier; Holden Camira; Isuzu Aska; Opel Ascona C Cadillac Cimarron

Powertrain
- Engine: 1297 cc Family I I4; 1598 cc Family II I4; 1796 cc Family II I4; 1998 cc Family II I4

After a four-year gestation period, the new front-wheel drive Cavalier was introduced on 26 August 1981. Unlike the previous generation, the Cavalier II had no styling or engineering difference from its Opel sibling the Ascona C, differing only in badging and trim. On its launch, it offered class-leading levels of fuel economy and performance which had previously been unseen in this size of car. Sales began the following month. The GM Family II engine - used on all but the base 1.3L model, was manufactured by Holden's Fishermans Bend, Australia factory.

This model was part of GM's family of compact J-cars, along with the new Opel Ascona, the Australian Holden Camira, the Brazilian Chevrolet Monza, the Japanese Isuzu Aska, and the North American Chevrolet Cavalier, Pontiac Sunbird, Buick Skyhawk, Oldsmobile Firenza (which made use of a Vauxhall nameplate from the 1970s), and Cadillac Cimarron. In the United Kingdom, the new Cavalier was a huge success and challenged the supremacy of the Ford Cortina as the company car of choice. Indeed, it went on sale only a year before the Cortina was discontinued.

By 1982, Ford and Vauxhall had an effective two-horse race at the top of this sector on the British market, as sales of the Talbot Alpine (previously a Chrysler until Peugeot took over the European operations of Chrysler) had tailed off by 1981, while British Leyland was winding down production of the Austin Ambassador hatchback and Morris Ital saloon and estate in preparation for the launch of an all-new car (which would be sold as the Austin Montego) by 1984. Popular foreign competitors at the time included the Renault 18, which had arrived on the British market in December 1978. The MK2 Cavalier also debuted in the same year as the MK2 Volkswagen Passat.

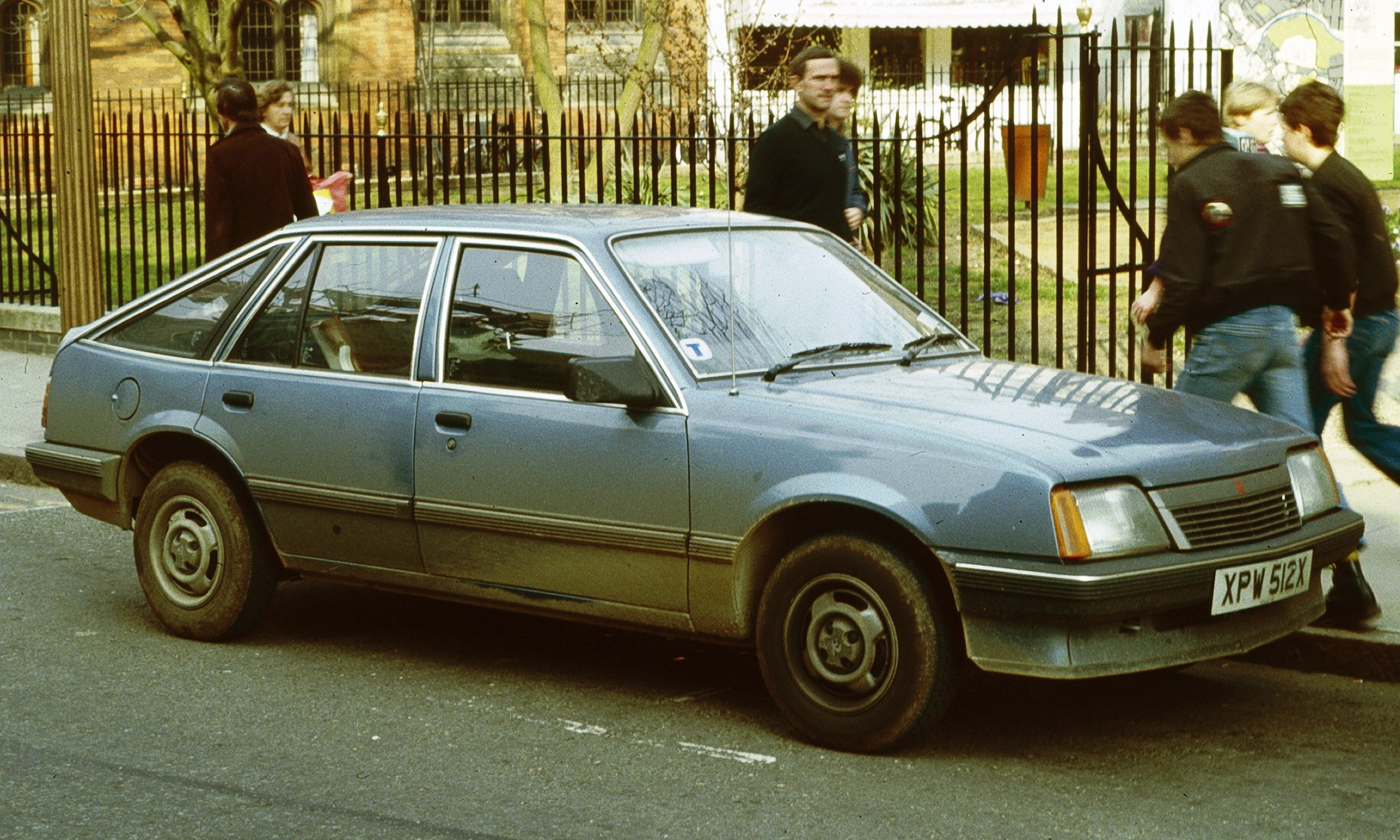
Mark II pre-facelift (front)

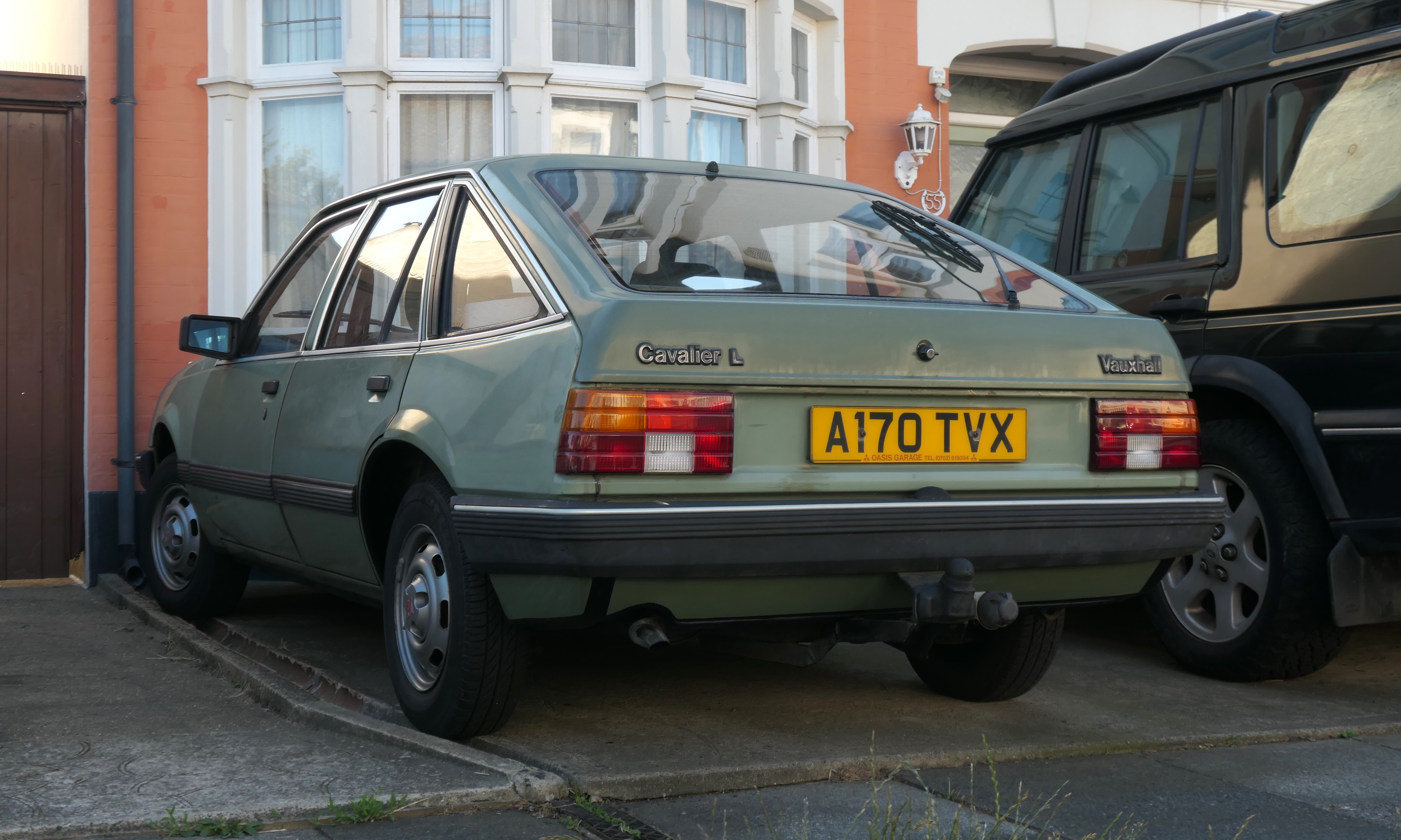
Mark II pre-facelift (rear)

Following the British public's reluctance to embrace the Ford Sierra's radical styling in 1982, the Cavalier overtook the Sierra in sales and outsold the Sierra in 1984 and again in 1985, although the Sierra had comfortably outsold it in 1983. The Sierra narrowly outsold it in 1986, and a facelift for the Sierra at the start of 1987 helped Ford build a wide lead at the top of the large family car sector as nearly 140,000 Sierras were sold that year, while Cavalier sales fell below 100,000.

By the time the second generation Cavalier was discontinued to make way for the third generation model in October 1988, the Sierra was almost twice as popular.

It was Britain's second best selling car (behind the Ford Escort) in 1984 and 1985, and at its peak, this version of the Cavalier came with the choice of 1.3 or 1.6 L engines derived from the smaller Vauxhall Astra (also sold as the Opel Kadett), while for 1983 a 1.8 L engine was launched, which had electronic fuel injection. A diesel of 1.6 L was added about the same time, while the 1.8 L was supplemented by a 2.0 L for the 1987 model year.

Perhaps surprisingly, it was narrowly beaten to the European Car of the Year award for 1982 by the Renault 9, with third place going to the Mark II Volkswagen Polo.

This model was produced as a two-door or four-door saloon and five-door hatchback. An estate version followed in October 1983, based on the Holden Camira estate with rear body panels imported from Australia. It was originally only available with the 1.6 S engine in Base, L, and GL models, and proved a slow seller. For 1985 the diesel was also made available, but the Estate still only represented about 7 percent of Cavalier sales in 1985 and 1986. The slow selling two-door saloon was dropped from the Cavalier range by October 1982 and the Birmingham Motor Show, although it remained part of the Ascona range in other markets. A convertible, based on the two-door and converted by Hammond & Thiede in Germany, was subsequently offered.

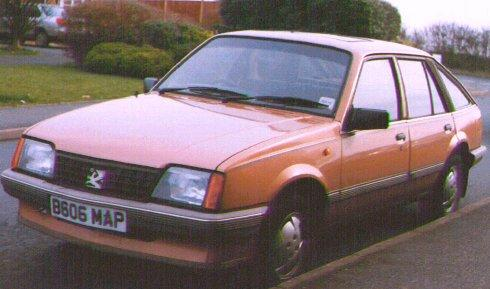
1985 facelifted GLS model.

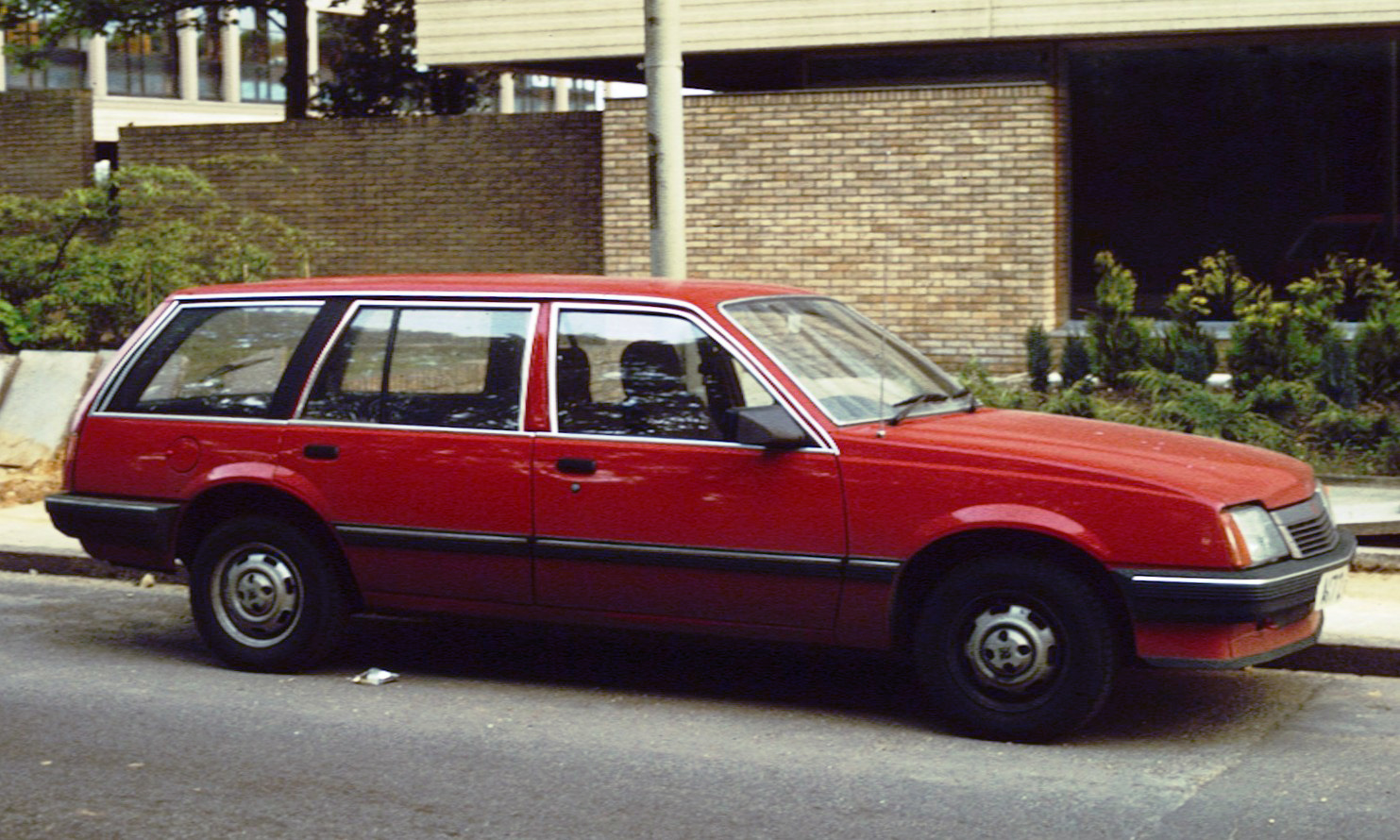
The estate version employed rear body panels supplied by Holden.

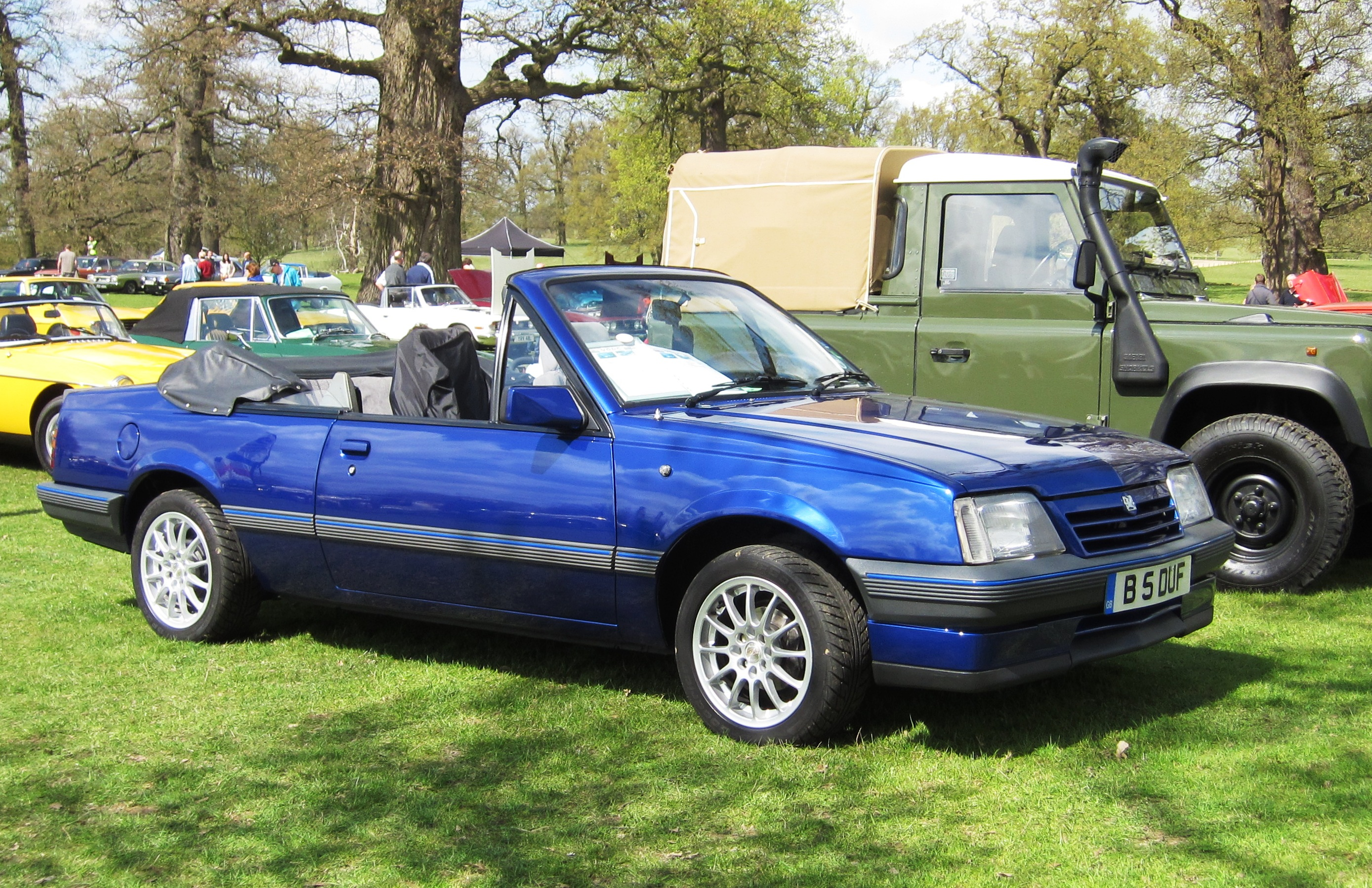
The Cavalier Cabriolet

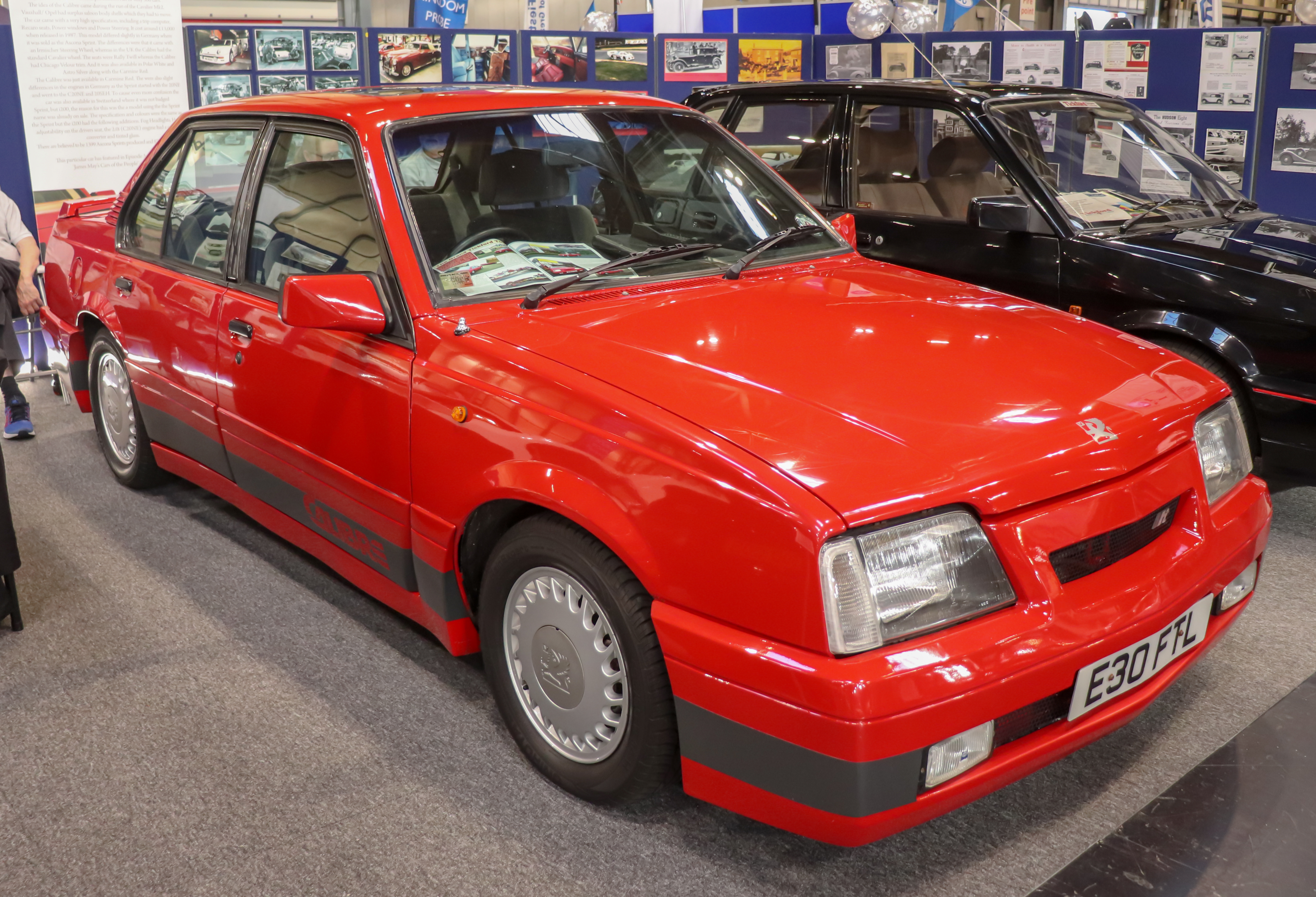
1988 Vauxhall Cavalier Calibre

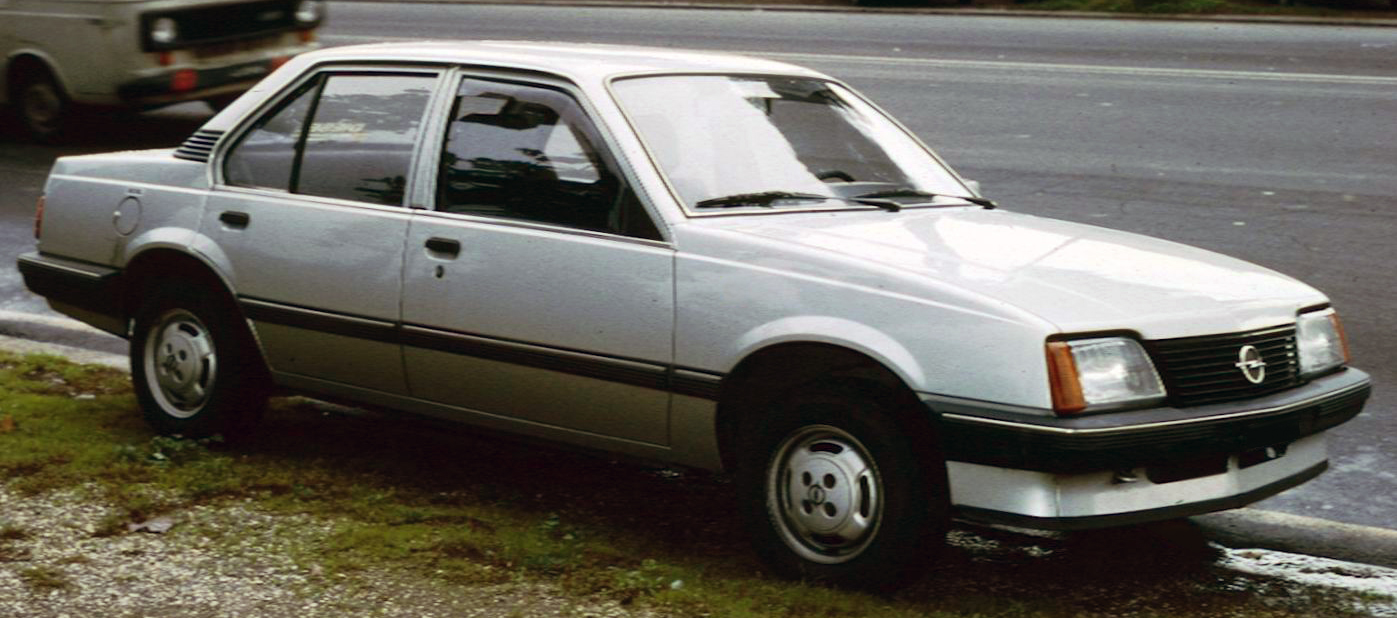
The second generation Vauxhall Cavalier was a version of the third generation Opel Ascona C shown here.

The Thatcher government in the United Kingdom created a tax break at 1.8 L, with any company car having a larger engine than this attracting higher personal benefit taxes, thus effectively giving the Cavalier an advantage over its rivals soon after its launch.

On its launch, the MK2 Cavalier was well received by the motoring press, and like its predecessor was the catalyst for another surge in Vauxhall sales. In 1981, just over 33,000 MK1 and MK2 Cavaliers had been sold in the UK, although it was still Britain's seventh best selling car. A year later, sales more than trebled to over 100,000 cars as Britain's fifth best selling car. In 1983, it attained more than 127,000 sales (some 7% of the new car market) and was the fourth best selling car, although it still trailed behind the new Ford Sierra. For 1984 and 1985, however, it was Britain's second best selling car, with more than 130,000 sales each year, comfortably outselling the fifth-place Sierra. In 1986, it was narrowly outsold by the Sierra, which then underwent a major facelift and became available as a saloon for the first time, and gained a wide sales lead over the Cavalier for the next two years.

=== First Facelift — Mk2b (1985–1987) ===
Mirroring changes being made to the Opel Ascona C, an updated Cavalier debuted in late 1984 (for the 1985 model year) which saw all models gain the "eggcrate" grille from the CD model, modified rear lamp clusters with darkened detailing, new steering wheels, larger steering column stalk switches, upgraded equipment, new upholstery options and different instrument graphics — some of these changes came direct from the recently introduced Kadett E/Astra Mark 2. Engine options were further expanded, with the fuel injected 1.8L engine now being available on GL trim.

=== Second Facelift — Mk2c (1987–1988) ===
Late 1986 saw the range updated for the second time before its eventual replacement by the Vectra A/Mk3 model in 1988, with new body-colour front grilles and rear lamp clusters revised again in a style similar to the larger Senator model together with further improvements to equipment levels. A new 2.0L version of the Family II engine became available on CD, SRi and GLS trim, whilst the availability of the fuel injected 1.8L unit was extended down to L trim.

The SRi model was now available with the uprated 20SEH engine, which had 130 hp (97 kW) and could exceed 120 mph (193 km/h). This had the same engine as the Astra GTE 8v (20SEH), though it was more powerful owing to a better exhaust route.

The last version of the Cavalier Mark II to be launched was the Cavalier Calibre. Based on the SRi130 with styling from Aston Martin/Tickford and the bodykit, sports suspension and exhaust being produced by Irmscher, it was a limited production run of 500 cars. The car came with a very high specification including a trip computer, Recaro seats, power windows and power steering. When released in 1987, it cost around £13,000 (equivalent to £37,645.83 in 2024).

Vauxhall sold 807,624 examples of the second generation Cavalier between 1981 and 1988. By December 1989, it was the third most common model of car on British roads, although these government statistics mostly calculated each car by its generation rather than by different nameplate, with pre and post facelifted versions of an unchanged basic design (for example the Ford Sierra) being counted separately.

In August 2006, Auto Express named it as the country's sixth most scrapped car of the last 30 years, with just 6,343 (fewer than 1%) still on the road. The only car to cease production after the Cavalier Mark II, and which disappeared at a greater rate, was the Skoda Estelle (which was withdrawn from sale in 1990). By December 2009, that figure had fallen to 1,289.

Trim levels

- Base (1.3 petrol, 1.6 petrol)
- L (1.3 petrol, 1.6 petrol, 1.6 diesel)
- Li (1.8i petrol)
- LX (1.6 petrol)
- LXi (1.8i petrol)
- GL (1.3 petrol, 1.6 petrol, 1.6 diesel)
- GLi (1.8i petrol)
- GLS (1.6 petrol)
- GLSi (1.8i petrol, 2.0i 114 bhp (85 kW; 116 PS) petrol)
- SR (1.6 petrol)
- SRi (1.8i petrol, 2.0i petrol 114 bhp (85 kW; 116 PS))
- SRi 130 (2.0i 128 bhp (95 kW; 130 PS) petrol)
- CDi (1.8i petrol, 2.0i 114 bhp (85 kW; 116 PS) petrol)
- Convertible (1.8i petrol)
- Estate (1.6 petrol)
- Estate L (1.6 petrol, 1.6 Diesel)
- Estate GL (1.6 petrol, 1.6 Diesel)

The "i" suffix stands for Fuel Injection.

Special editions

- Commander (1.6 petrol)
- Antibes (1.6 petrol)
- Club (1.6 petrol)
- Calibre (Same 2.0 fuel injection engine of the SRi 130)

== Mark III (1988–1995) ==
Cavalier Mark III
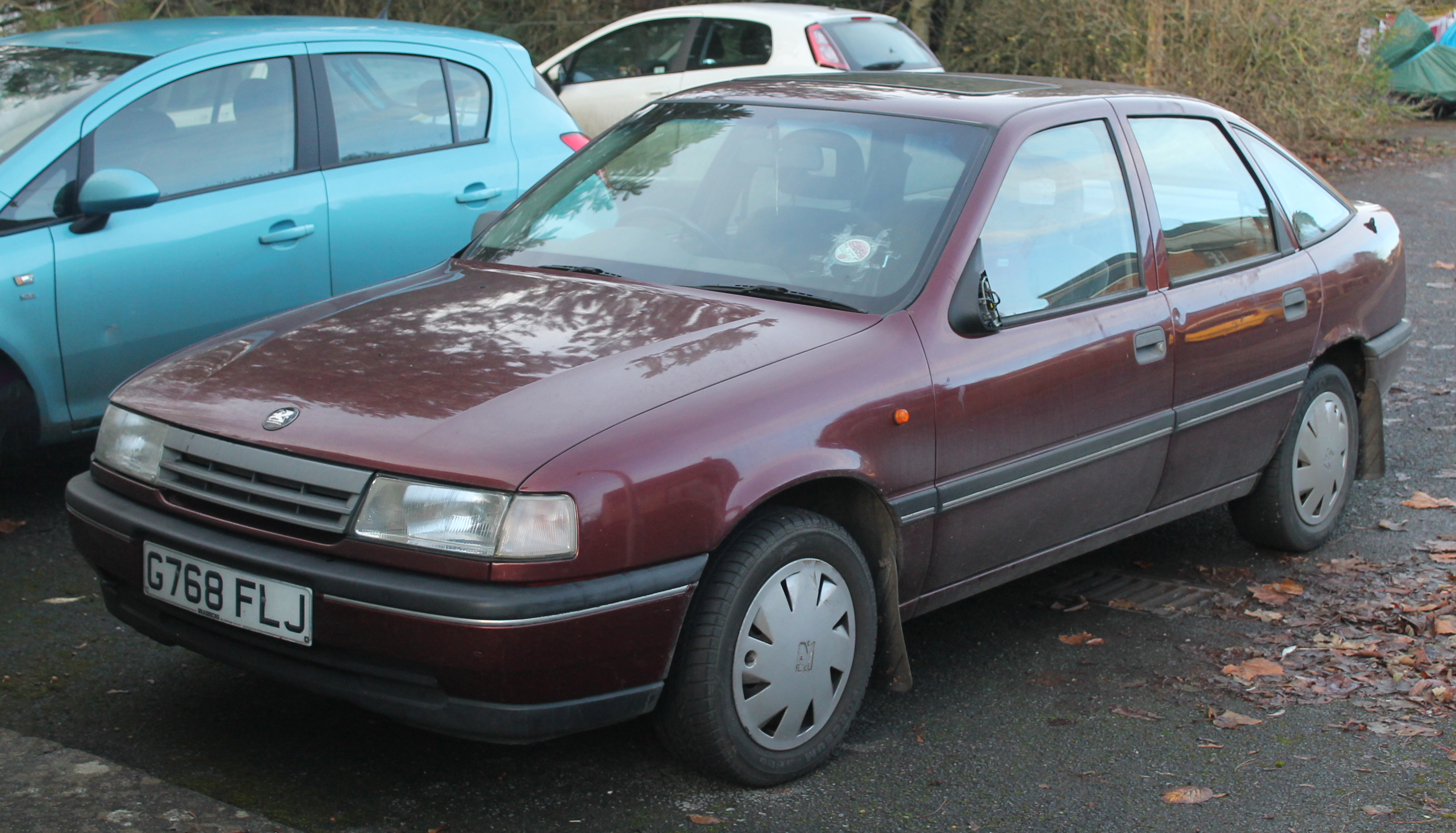

Overview
- Production: October 1988 – October 1995 (Pre 1992 facelift)

Body and chassis
- Body style: 4-door saloon 5-door hatchback
- Layout: FF layout/AWD
- Platform: GM2900
- Related: Opel Calibra; Opel Vectra; Saab 900; Saab 9-5 (YS3E); Saab 9-3

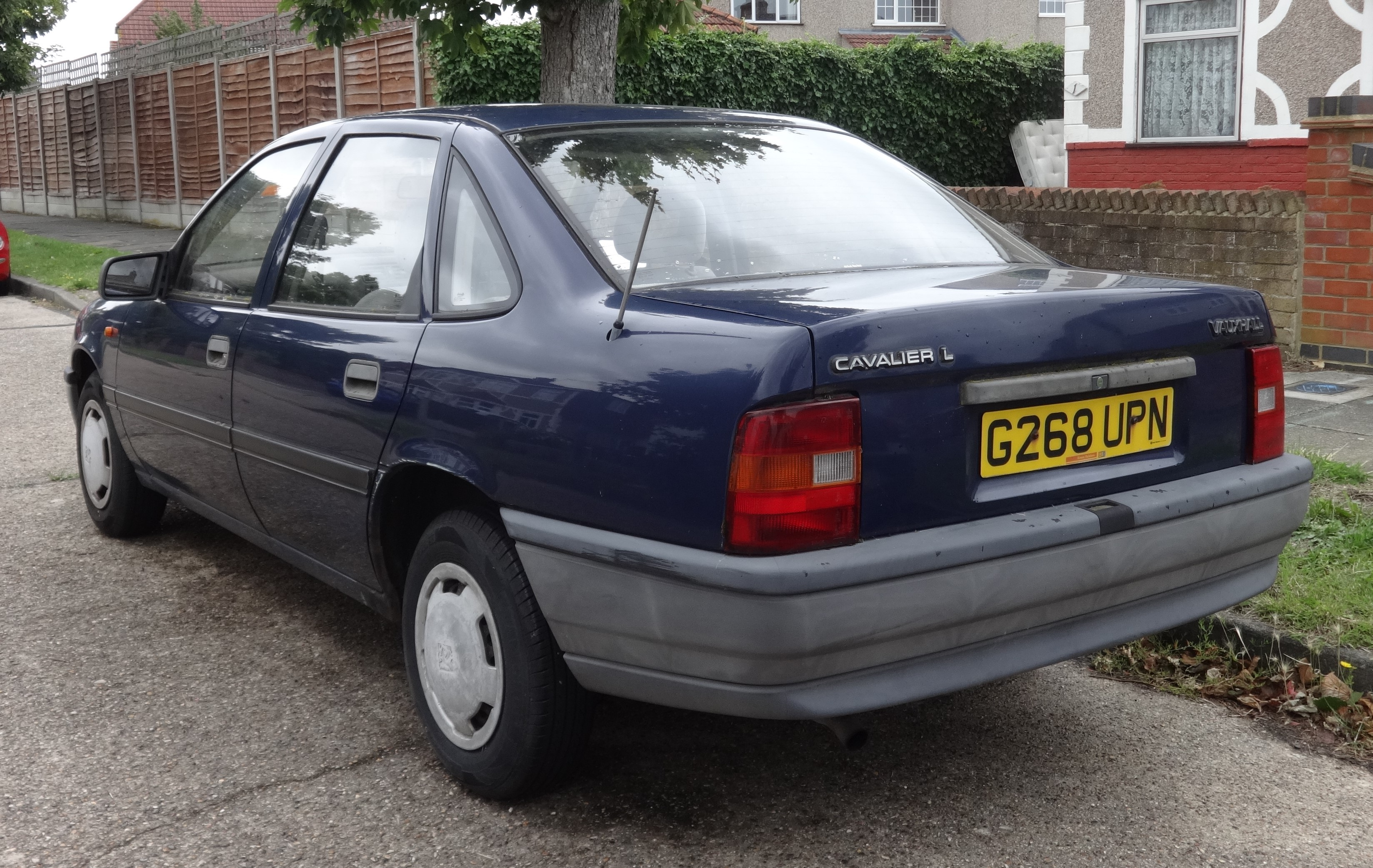
Pre-facelift Vauxhall Cavalier L (4-door saloon)

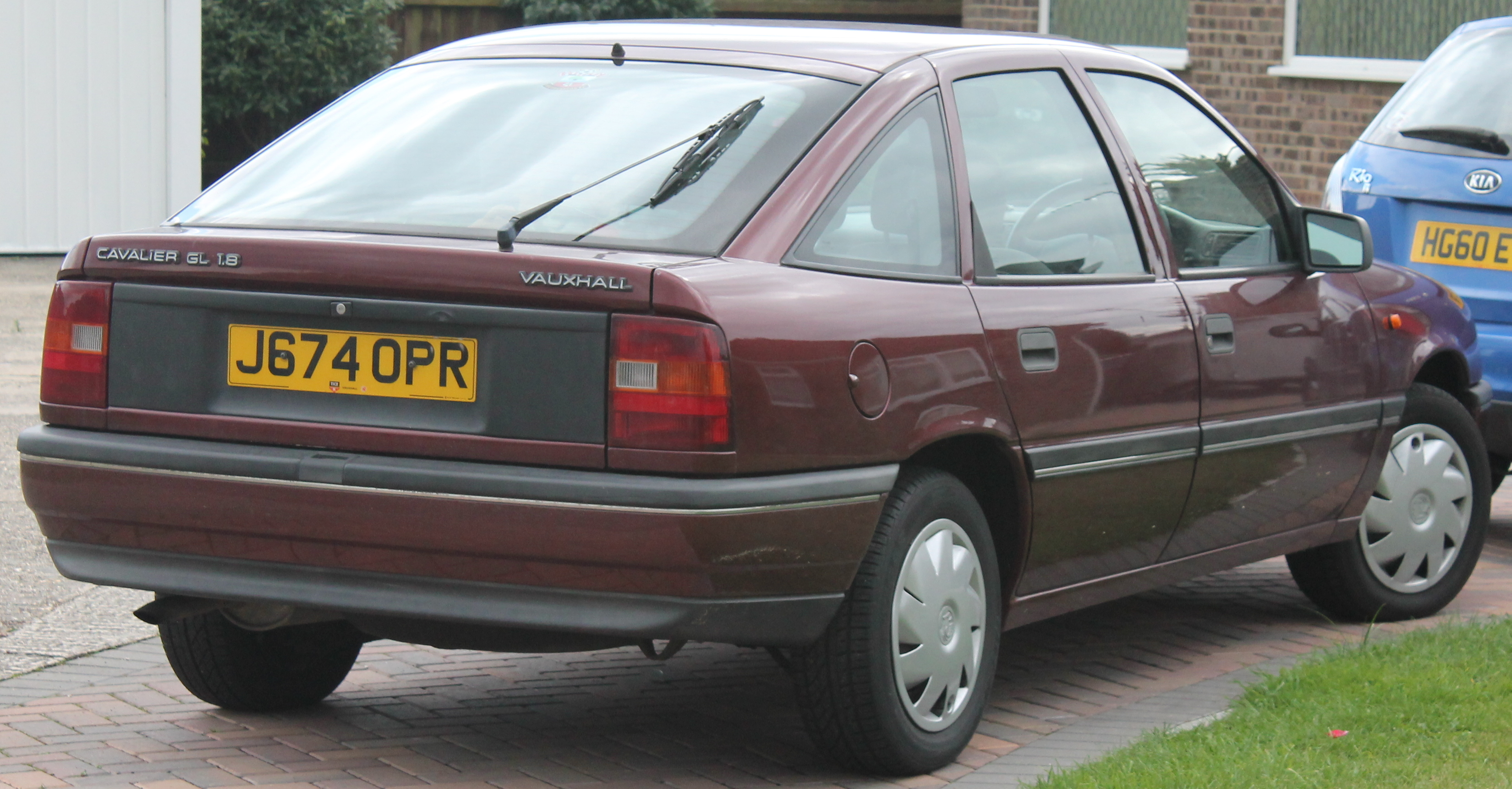
Pre-facelift Vauxhall Cavalier GL 1.8 (5-door hatchback)

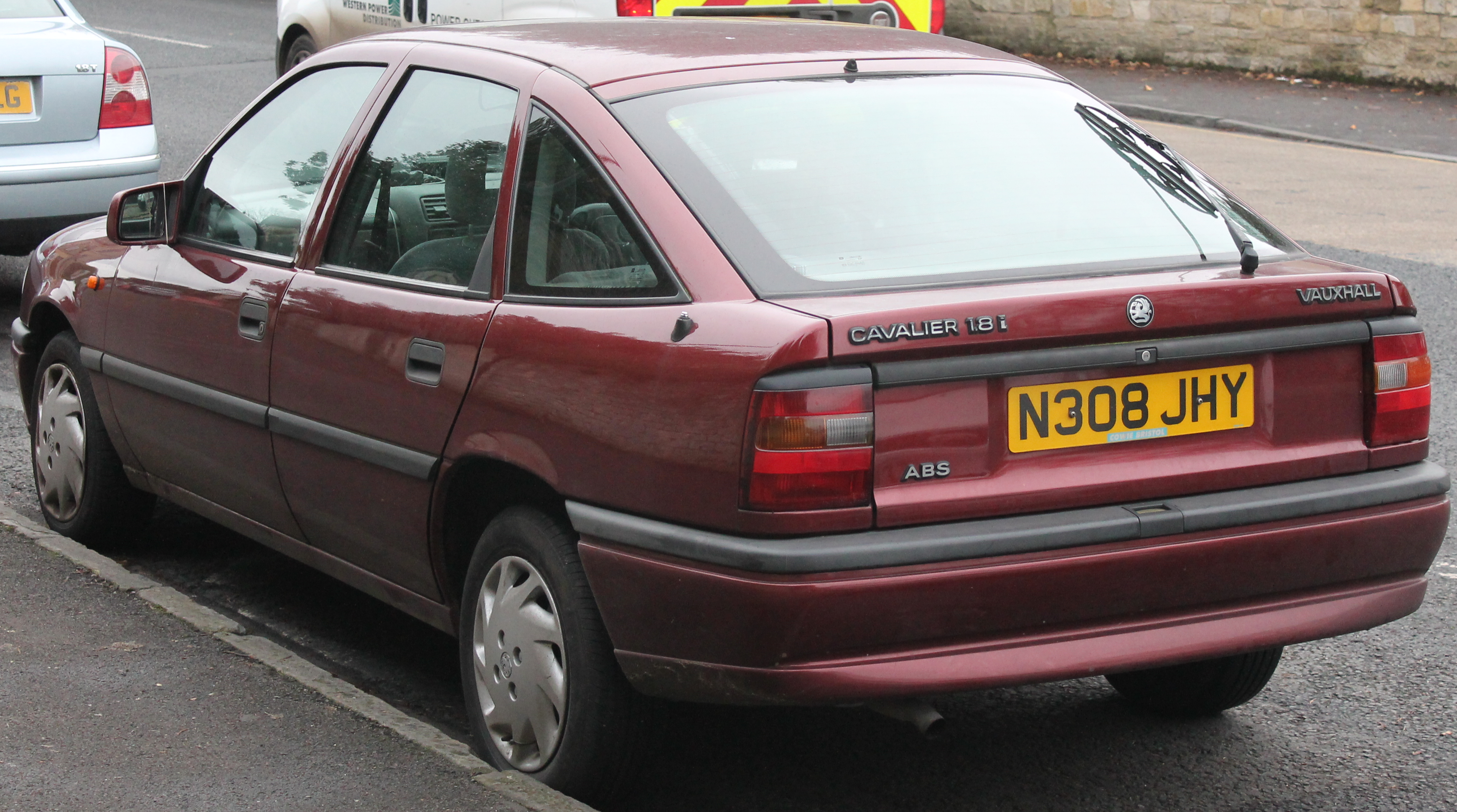
Post-facelift Vauxhall Cavalier Classic

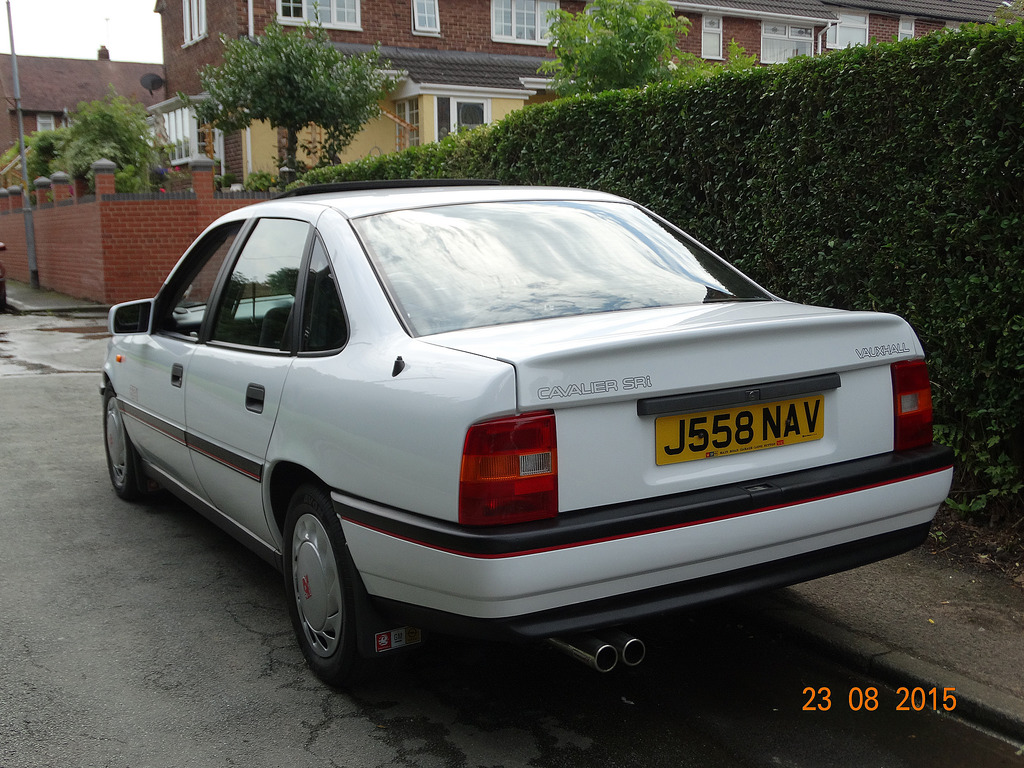
Pre-Facelift Cavalier SRi

By the mid-1980s, General Motors had started developing a new model to replace the J-Car models in Europe (its American, Australian and Japanese divisions would instead be replaced by different designs in due course) by the end of the decade. Opel, in developing the Ascona C/Cavalier II replacement had already begun a policy of retiring its legacy model names (a process that had started with the Rekord being replaced with the Omega two years earlier), hence the new car would carry the 'Vectra' nameplate. Vauxhall however with its strong brand loyalty in the UK, elected to keep the Cavalier name. Soon afterwards, development also began on a new coupé which would share the same underpinnings as the hatchbacks and saloons, but would use a different nameplate and feature completely different styling.

The final generation Cavalier went on sale on 14 October 1988, being Vauxhall's version of the Opel Vectra "A", again available as a saloon and hatchback. There was no estate version in the Opel line-up, and as this design was not going to be sold in Australia, there was no prospect of Vauxhall turning to Holden for a replacement. Early plans for an estate model exclusive to Europe to be developed never materialised. During 1989, however, the Cavalier's floorpan did spawn a new coupé — the Calibra, the first Vauxhall coupé since the original Cavalier Coupé was discontinued in 1981. The Calibra was the official replacement for the Opel Manta, which had been discontinued in 1988, and was also sold on continental Europe under the Opel Brand. Plans for the Calibra to be imported to the USA under the Saab brand never materialised.

The Vectra name was not adopted at this model change as Vauxhall feared reviving memories of the much-maligned Vauxhall Victor, whereas the Cavalier was a generally well received product and had helped boost Vauxhall's sales and reputation. Early Victors had been viewed in some quarters as excessively corrosion prone, but the Victor was becoming a very distant memory by this stage: the Vectra name would eventually appear on a Vauxhall in 1995, when the Cavalier was finally replaced.

For the first time in fifteen years, Vauxhall began exporting cars in LHD to other European countries, with Cavaliers badged as Opel Vectras, which was a boost to GM's confidence in its once-troubled British division.

In place of the Mark II Cavalier's angular exterior was a more rounded appearance, reflecting the change in styling tastes throughout Europe at this time. There was also a new economical 1.4 L petrol engine. The biggest changes to the range were the addition of 2.0-litre, sixteen-valve engines, better known as the "red top" or XE, fitted to the GSi 2000 and later SRis. Also made available was a four-wheel drive system, fitted to a 2.0i model (8 valve SRi spec) and on a version of the GSi 2000.

There were two diesels available: a 1.7 L, 60 hp (45 kW) from launch, and an 82 hp (61 kW) 1.7-litre Isuzu-engined lightly blown turbodiesel from 1992. The early SRis were fitted with the 2.0-litre eight-valve engine from the previous Cavalier model, which produced 130 hp (97 kW) without a catalytic converter.

Despite the lack of an estate body style, the Cavalier topped the large medium family car sales charts in Britain in 1990, narrowly outselling the Ford Sierra, while Rover was beginning to phase out its Montego in favour of the new Rover 400 Series and later the more upmarket 600 Series. Other strong contenders in this sector included the long-running Citroën BX and Peugeot's highly regarded 405.

Having first outsold the Sierra in Britain in 1990, it was Britain's second best selling car behind the Ford Escort in 1992. It did not lose top spot in its sector until it was overtaken by the Sierra's successor, the Mondeo, in 1994.

The Calibra, launched in 1989, was well received, notably for its sporty although cramped interior (largely based on the interior of the Cavalier) and its streamlined styling which in turn enabled the Calibra to have the lowest drag coefficient of the period at 0.26 for the 8v model (0.29 for the rest) — a record it held for the next 10 years.

A few variants were made: the 2.0 litre eight valve, 2.0 L sixteen valve (the same engine found in the proven Cavalier GSi 2000), the turbo version (again, the same engine used in the very successful Cavalier Turbo), the 2.5 L V6 (with a top speed of around 145 mph) and finally the 2.0 L 16-valve "Ecotec".

A facelift in the autumn of 1992 for the 1993 model year saw the Cavalier's 1.4 L engine dropped and the 167 bhp (125 kW) 2.5 L V6 added to the range. At this time the GSi 2000 was replaced by a new four wheel drive version badged simply "Cavalier Turbo", with a turbocharged version of the sixteen valve engine producing over 200 hp (150 kW). The Vauxhall logo was added to the centre of the boot. Most of the range now had airbags and anti-lock brakes as standard (the first car in its class to do so) and all models were fitted with a toughened safety cage, side-impact beams (providing additional longitudinal load paths) and front-seatbelt pretensioners. This version of the Cavalier was the first Vauxhall to feature a driver's airbag, with a passenger one being optional; this feature soon became available across the rest of the company's range.

The exterior design was also freshened up, with a new look grille, headlights, rear lights and bumper mouldings and an increase in sound insulation, especially in GLS and higher models, making the Cavalier a quiet place to travel in. In late 1994, the new 2.0L Ecotec engine was launched replacing both the popular eight-valve C20NE and high-performance, sixteen-valve "redtop" engine. The new engine had improved fuel economy and low-end torque at the cost of maximum power output, 136 hp (101 kW) compared to 150 hp (112 kW) for the "redtop" that it replaced.

After twenty years and three generations, the Cavalier came to an end in October 1995 when it was replaced by the Vectra, though sales continued for about a year afterwards and several P registered versions (August 1996 to July 1997 period) were sold.

The third and final incarnation of the Cavalier was a big improvement over its predecessors (and most earlier Vauxhalls) in terms of durability, with the rust problems that had plagued Vauxhall for years finally being conquered. This was reflected by the fact that Mark III Cavaliers were a common sight on British roads for well over a decade after the end of production.

The demise of the Cavalier name marked a significant moment for the Luton-based company, as it would be the last of its main models with a distinct name from its Opel counterparts until the rebadging of the Opel Speedster as the Vauxhall VX220 and the Opel Karl as the Vauxhall Viva. All future Vauxhall models would share their names with those of Opel, or in the case of the 2004 Vauxhall Monaro, with Holden. However, the Astra nameplate was chosen by Vauxhall at the beginning of 1980 for its version of the first front-wheel drive Opel Kadett, and from 1991 General Motors decided to sell the Opel version of the car as the Astra.

This version of the Cavalier shared its chassis with the Saab 900 that was produced from 1993 until 1998, and continued until 2002 as the Saab 9-3, due to Saab also being within the General Motors combine at the time.

Trim levels were:

1988–1992 range

- Base (1.4, 1.6 petrol)
- L (1.4, 1.6, 1.6i, 1.8, 1.8i, 2.0i 8v petrol, 1.7 diesel, 1.7 turbodiesel)
- GL (1.6, 1.6i, 1.8, 1.8i, 2.0i 8v petrol, 1.7 diesel, 1.7 turbodiesel)
- CD (2.0i 8v petrol)
- Diplomat (2.0i 8v petrol)
- 4x4 (2.0i 8v petrol) (130 bhp)
- SRi (2.0i 8v petrol) (130 bhp)
- GSi (2.0i 16v petrol)
- Concept (1.8i petrol)
- Expression (1.6 (16SV) petrol)

1992–1995 range

- Envoy (1.6i petrol, 1.7 diesel, 1.7 turbodiesel)
- LS (1.6i, 1.8i, 2.0i 8v, 2.0 16v (X20XEV) petrol, 1.7 diesel, 1.7 turbodiesel)
- Colorado (1.8i Petrol)
- GLS (1.6i, 1.8i, 2.0i 8v 2.0i 16v 2.5 V6 petrol, 1.7 turbodiesel)
- V6 (2.5i V6 (C25XE) petrol)
- CD (2.0i (C20NE) petrol, 1.7 Turbodiesel)
- CDX (2.0i (X20XEV), 2.5 V6 petrol (C25XE), 1.7 turbodiesel)
- Diplomat (2.0 8v (C20NE), 2.5 V6 (C25XE) Petrol)
- SRi (2.0i (C20NE 1992–1994, C20XE 1992–1994, X20XEV 1994–1995) petrol)
- Cesaro (1.8i & 2.5 V6 (C25XE) petrol)
- Turbo (2.0 16v 4x4 petrol 6 speed Turbocharged (C20LET))
- Ethos (1.6i E-Drive & 1.7Turbo diesel)
- Expression (1.8i)
- Concept (1.6i)

== Popularity ==
A total of more than 1,800,000 Cavaliers were sold in three generations, and a 20-year production run, making it the fifth most popular car ever sold in Britain.

Following its launch in October 1975, the original Cavalier took time to gain ground on the British market, with just under 30,000 sales placing it as the 13th best selling car for 1976. It climbed to eighth place the following year with more than 41,000 sales, peaking at seventh place in 1978 with over 55,000 sales. It was still the seventh best seller in 1980, though sales for that year had dipped back to just over 41,000 as the economy entered recession.

Well over 200,000 were sold in total over a six-year production run, but by the end of 2009 just 373 remained, and it had been a rare sight on British roads even by the mid-1990s. The Mark II Cavalier was a much bigger success. In 1982, its first full year on sale, just over 100,000 were sold in Britain. This placed it as Britain's fourth best selling car, putting it just 35,000 sales short of its key rival, the Ford Cortina, which was replaced that autumn by the all-new Sierra. 1983 saw Cavalier sales in Britain exceed 127,000 as it retained fourth place, but it was outsold by the Sierra which occupied second place with almost 160,000 sales.

The next two years, however, saw the Cavalier top the large family car sector in Britain in terms of sales, and overall it was the nation's second best selling car behind the Ford Escort, breaking the 130,000 barrier on both occasions while the Sierra only just made it into six figures. Despite falling popularity towards the end of production which saw the Ford Sierra comfortably outsell it, a total of 807,624 Mark II Cavaliers were sold in Britain during its seven-year production run. The Mark II Cavalier remained a popular second hand buy and common sight on British roads for a decade or so afterwards, and proved to be more resistant to rust than its predecessor as well as earlier Vauxhalls.

The Mark III Cavalier enjoyed similar popularity to its predecessor. Launched in October 1988, Cavalier sales for 1989 stood at 130,000 (including some Mark II's) as it was Britain's fourth best selling car overall, while the Ford Sierra stood second with more than 175,000 sales, but in 1990, it edged ahead of the Sierra into third place, and by 1992, it was Britain's second best selling car with nearly 110,000 sales (the lower figures being the result of the recession at the time) while sales of the ageing Sierra had slumped to less than 80,000.

The Sierra's successor, the Mondeo, overtook it in 1994 but even in the Cavalier's last year in production, 1995, it still managed nearly 74,000 sales, despite being replaced by the Vectra in October 1995.

By February 2016, just over 4,500 Cavaliers across all three generations were still in use on Britain's roads, with most remaining examples being MK3 models. More than 1.8 million had been sold there.

== Motorsport ==
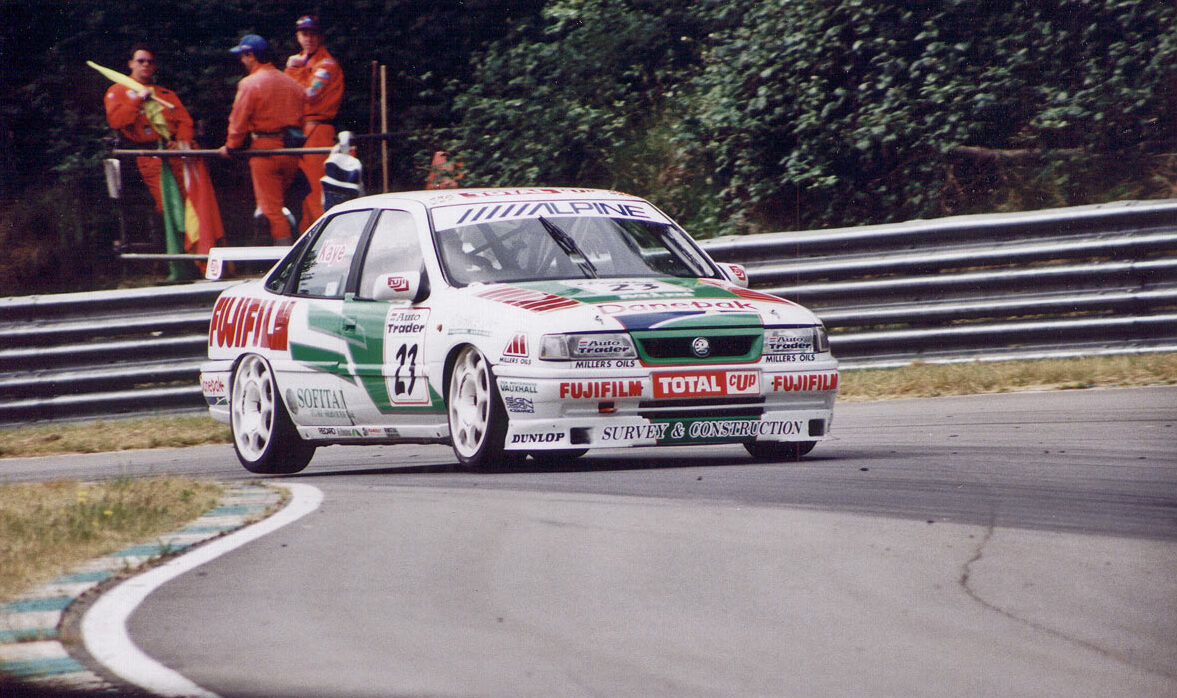
Richard Kaye 1996 BTCC

The Cavalier was used in the British Touring Car Championship from 1990 to 1995. The Cavalier was competitive, with Vauxhall Motorsport winning the Manufacturers' Championship in 1992, but the strength of the competition, and bad luck, conspired to deny John Cleland the Drivers' title in both the 1991 and 1992 seasons, finishing 2nd in 1991 and 3rd in 1992 – the latter a result of a dramatic final-race showdown, culminating in a collision between Cleland and rival Steve Soper.

1993 and 1994 both saw Cleland finish 4th in the championship; however the Cavalier finally won the Drivers' title in 1995, with John Cleland winning the Drivers' Championship, and Vauxhall Sport the Manufacturers' title.

The Cavalier was replaced by the Vectra in 1996, although privateers such as Richard Kaye and Jamie Wall would continue to use them until the end of the 1997 season.
