= Aurora 122 C =

Overview
- Manufacturer: Aurora Projetos Automobilísticos
- Production: 1992
- Assembly: Brazil
- Designer: Oduvaldo Barranco; Raúl Napoli; Ladislau Haida

Body and chassis
- Class: Sports car
- Body style: Two-seat
- Layout: Rear-wheel drive

Powertrain
- Engine: 2,184 cc (133.3 cu in), 215 hp (160 kW) with Garett turbocharger
- Transmission: 5-speed manual

The Aurora 122 C is a Brazilian sports car developed by Aurora Projetos Automobilísticos, first shown at the 1990 São Paulo Motor Show. With lines inspired by the Ferrari F40, the vehicle uses its own chassis. The engine is based on the 2.0 L Chevrolet Monza engine, with capacity increased to 2.2 liters. It uses a Garrett turbocharger, which generates a power output of 215 hp (160 kW).
