= Opel Kadett E =

Kadett E
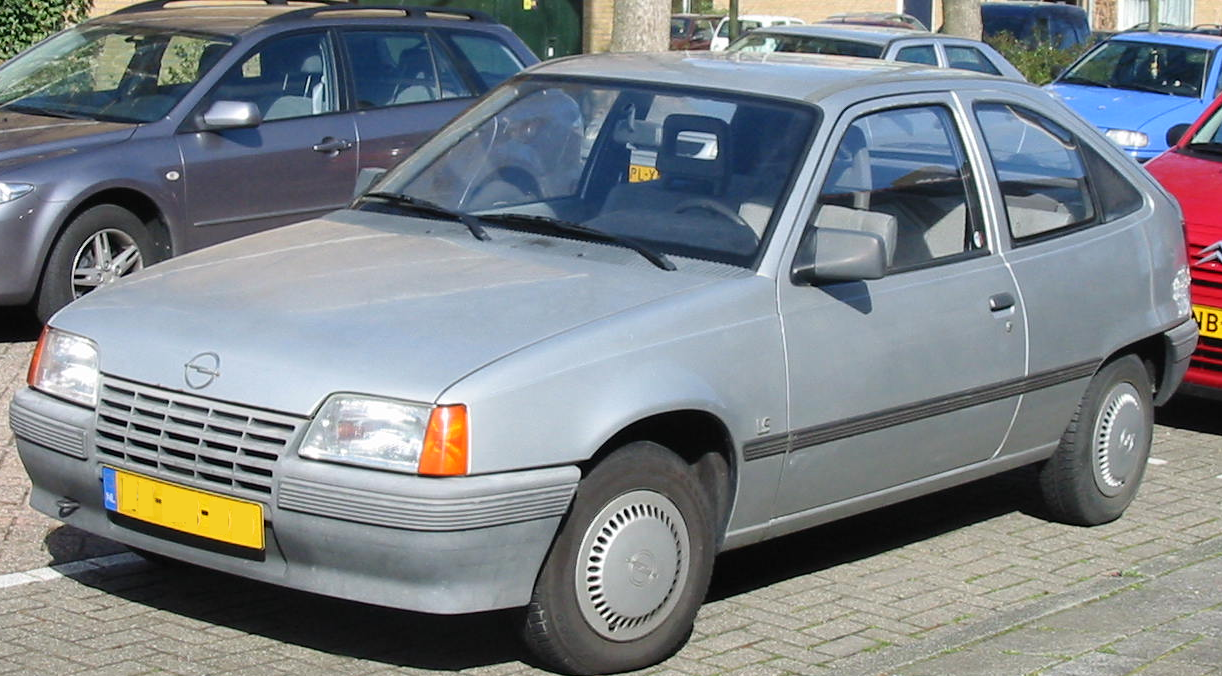
- Pre-facelift Kadett 1.3 LS (1987)

Overview
- Also called: Opel Astra (East Africa; GMEA); Opel/Vauxhall Cabrio (1991–1993); Opel Monza (RSA); Chevrolet Kadett (hatchback; BRA); Chevrolet Ipanema (wagon; BRA); Daewoo LeMans/Racer/Cielo/Nexia (ROK); IDA Opel Kadett (YUG); Passport Optima (CAN); Pontiac LeMans (US and NZ); Vauxhall Astra (GB); Vauxhall Belmont (GB); Bedford Astra (GB); Bedford Astramax (GB)
- Production: 1984–1998
- Assembly: Antwerp, Belgium; Bochum, Germany; São José dos Campos, Brazil (Chevrolet); São Caetano do Sul, Brazil (Chevrolet); Azambuja, Portugal; Ellesmere Port, United Kingdom; Kikinda, Yugoslavia (IDA-Opel); Zaragoza, Spain; Port Elizabeth, South Africa (Delta Motor Corporation)
- Designer: Gordon M. Brown

Body and chassis
- Class: Small family car (C)
- Body style: 3- and 5-door hatchback; 4-door saloon; 3- and 5-door estate (Caravan); 2-door convertible
- Layout: Transverse front-engine, front-wheel drive
- Platform: T-platform
- Related: Opel Kadett Combo

Powertrain
- Engine: petrol: 1196 cc Opel OHV I4; 1297 cc Family 1 I4; 1396 cc Family 1 I4; 1598 cc Family 1 I4; 1598 cc Family II I4; 1796 cc Family II I4; 1998 cc Family II I4; diesel: 1488 cc 4EC1 turbo I4; 1686 cc 4EE1 I4; 1699 cc Family II I4
- Transmission: 4/5-speed manual 3-speed GM THM125 automatic

Dimensions
- Wheelbase: 2,520 mm (99.2 in)
- Length: Hatchback & convertible: 3,998 mm (157.4 in); Saloon & Caravan: 4,218 mm (166 in)
- Width: 1,662 mm (65.4 in)
- Height: 1,393 mm (54.8 in)
- Curb weight: 850–1,010 kg (1,874–2,227 lb)

Chronology
- Predecessor: Opel Kadett D
- Successor: Opel Astra F

The Opel Kadett E was introduced in August 1984 as the sixth generation of the Opel Kadett, and was voted the 1985 European Car of the Year. As with its predecessor, it was sold as the Vauxhall Astra in the United Kingdom. This model was also developed into a more conventional three-box design with a boot (trunk), badged as the Vauxhall Belmont in the United Kingdom, launched at Frankfurt Motor Show in 1985. There was an estate car called the "Caravan", available with either three or five doors. In South Africa, the Kadett notchback was sold as the Opel Monza, along with a convertible. This replaced the Opel Ascona.

== Design ==
The car was noted for its advanced aerodynamics and distinctive "teardrop" shape—mirroring the trend in the mid 1980s for swooping aerodynamic styling—with the front end styling taken directly from the Opel Tech 1 concept car of 1981, although some styling cues from the Kadett D were retained for continuity such as its 'Kamm tail' and oversized C-pillar extraction vent. The hatchback had a drag coefficient of Cd=0.32; the less efficiently shaped three-box sedan still lost very little of the aerodynamics with Cd=0.33.

A convertible version was also available, for the first time in 1987, built by Bertone of Torino, Italy, bringing it to line with competitors, such as the Ford Escort and Volkswagen Golf. For the 1988 model, capacities were raised from 1.3 to 1.4 litres. In the fall of 1986 a new 1,998 cc engine replaced the 1.8 hitherto used on the GSi and Vauxhall Astra GTE in many markets, although the uncatalyzed 1.8 continued to be built for some places until the end of production in 1991. In 1988, a 16-valve twin-cam version was developed for a high-performance GSi/GTE model (the first application of the 20XE "Red Top" engine), yielding 156 PS (115 kW) in non-catalyzed form, six less horsepower with a catalytic converter fitted. While criticized for a lack of refinement, the GSi 16V was also lauded as the most powerful car available in its class at the time. Aside from the "16V" badging, it could be told from an eight-valve GSi by its twin rectangular exhaust pipes.

The Kadett E was a grey import in the United Kingdom, but not popular compared to its badge engineered sister, the Vauxhall Astra Mk II. It was never officially sold in Britain, and by 1989, General Motors was only marketing the Vauxhall brand in the United Kingdom, although Astras assembled at Vauxhall's Ellesmere Port plant were exported to the rest of Europe badged as Opel Kadetts. There was also a van version with a raised roof, called the Opel Kadett Combo in Europe, and the Bedford Astramax in the United Kingdom.

=== Gallery ===
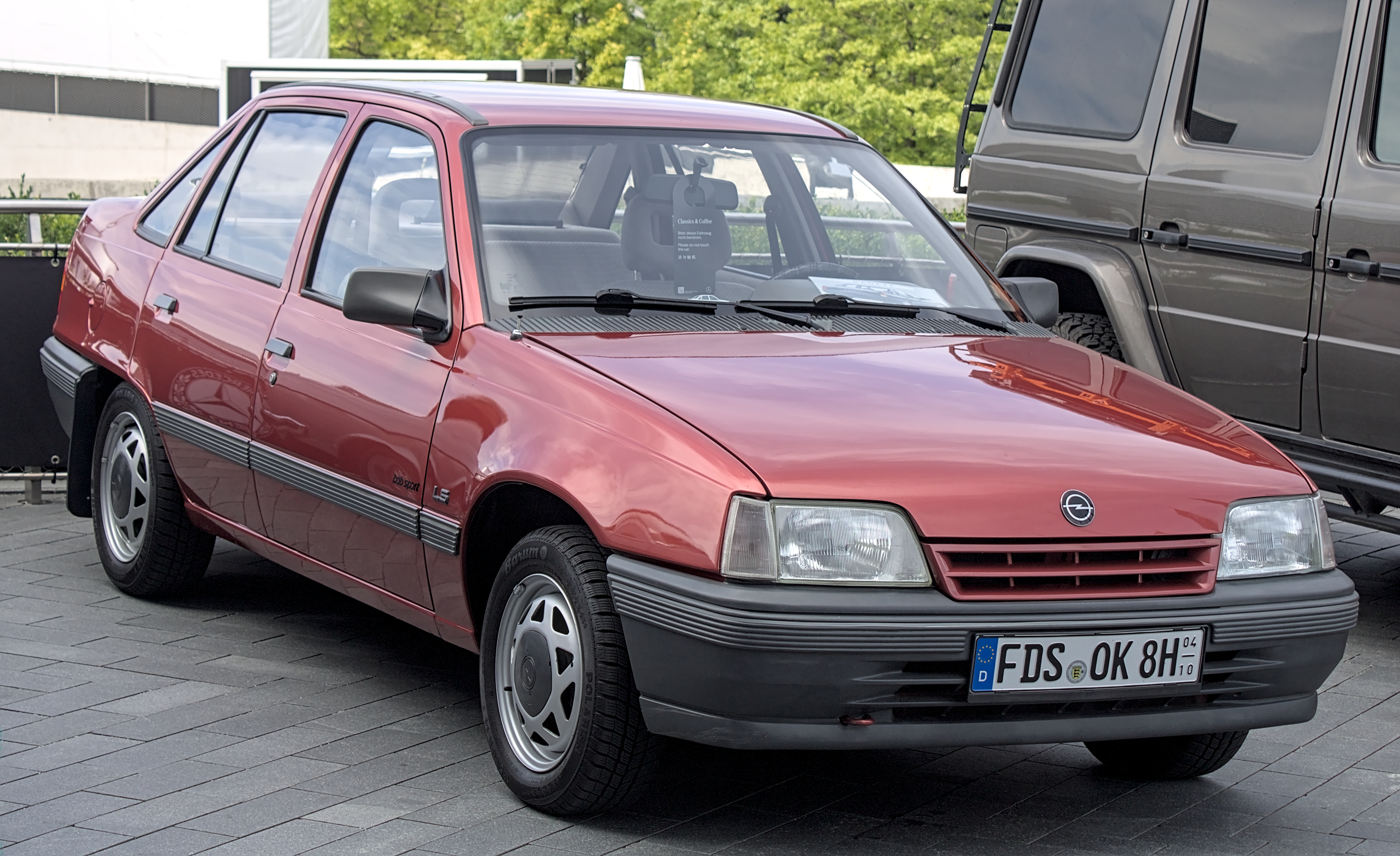
Opel Kadett saloon (1985–1989)

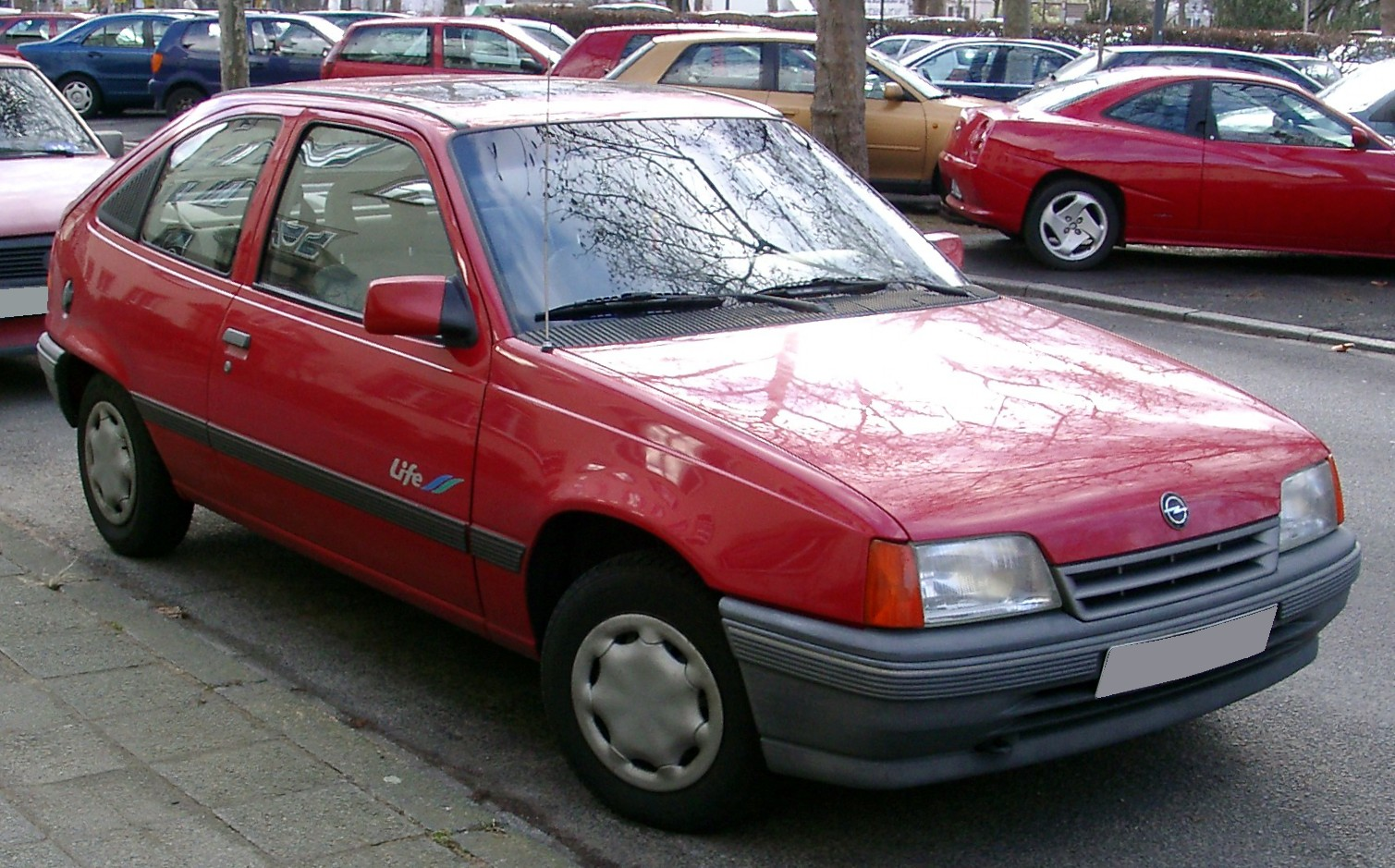
Opel Kadett 3-door (1989–1991)

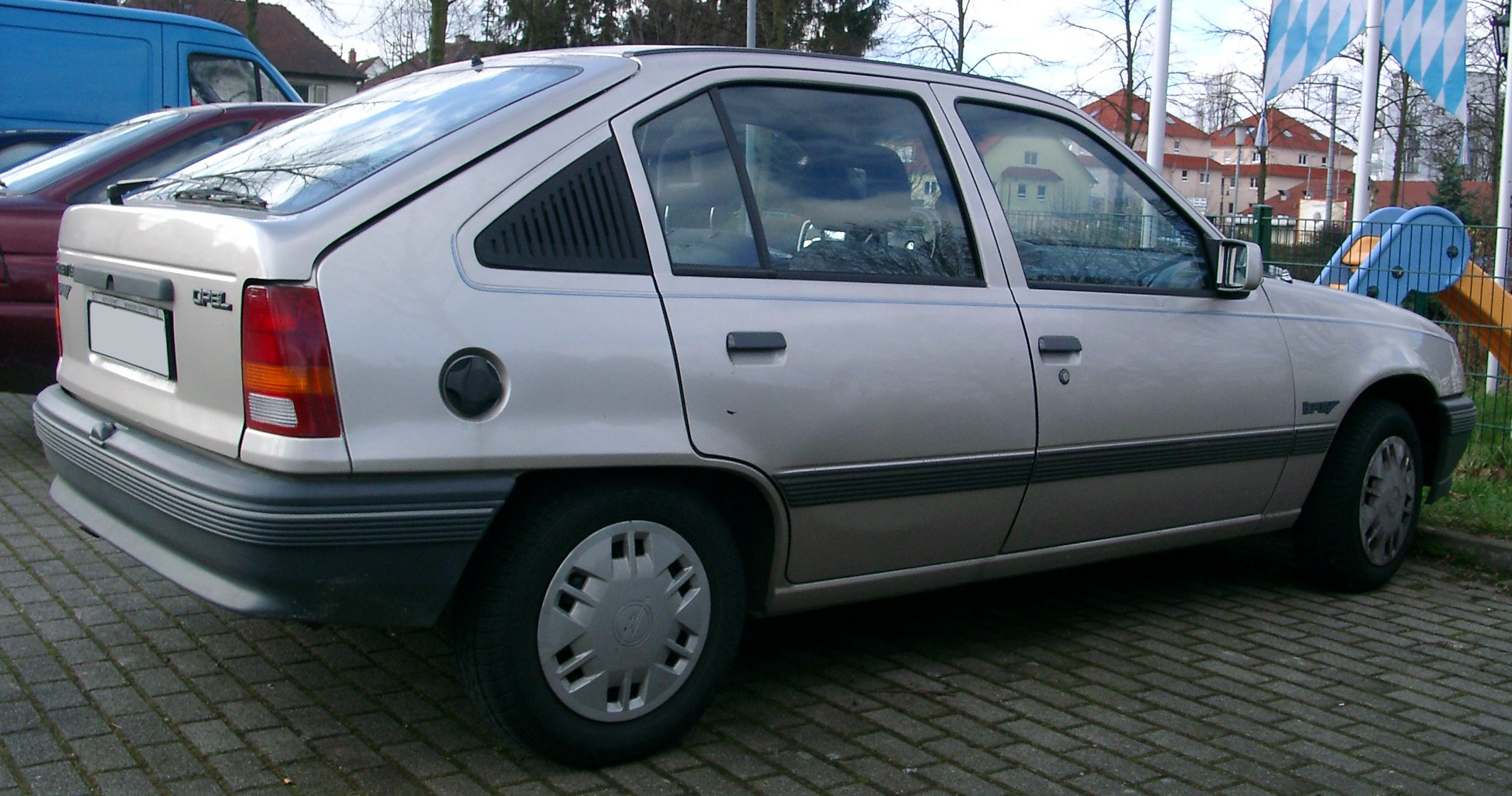
Opel Kadett 5-door (1989–1991)

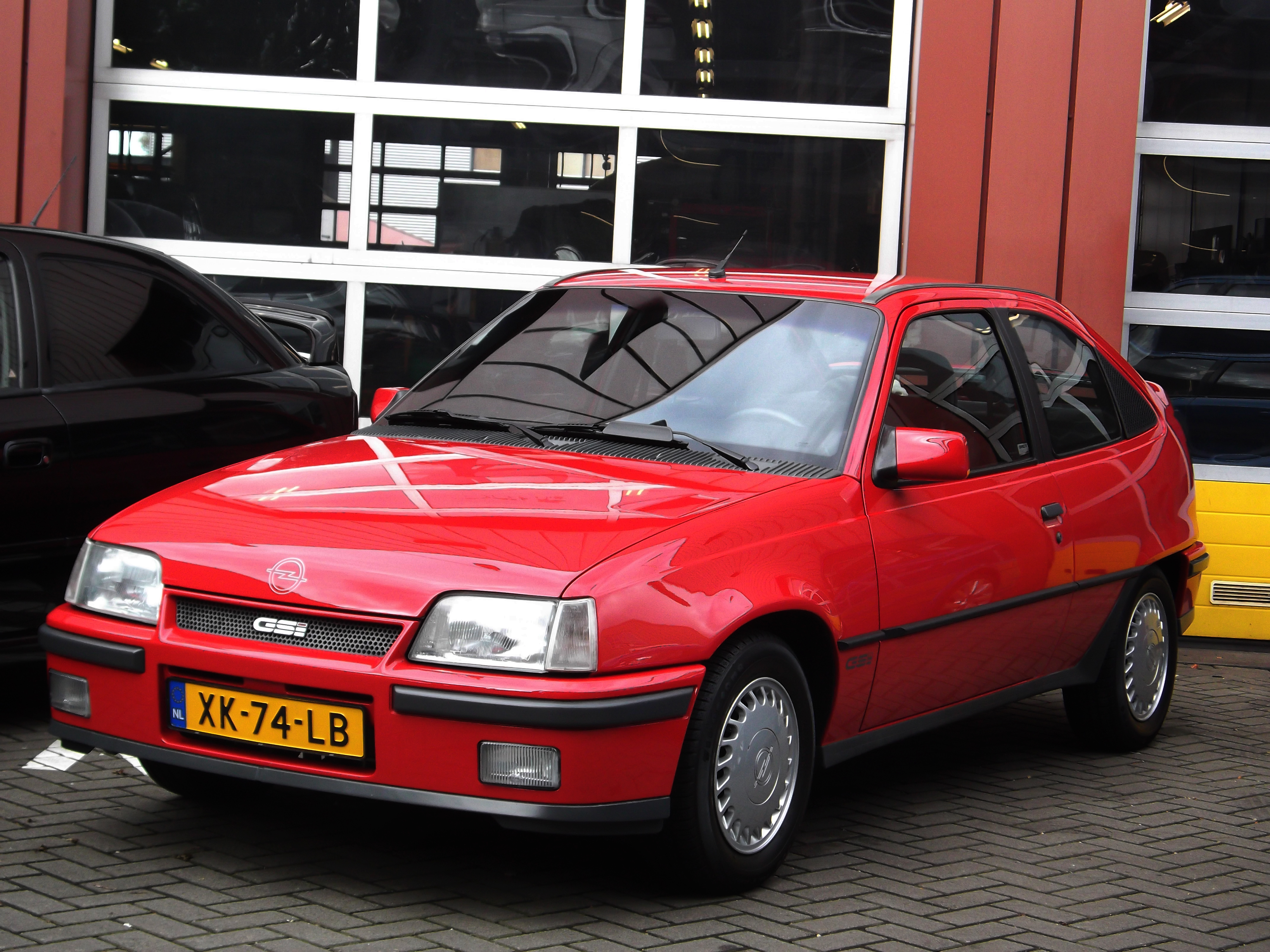
1989 Opel Kadett GSi (Europe)

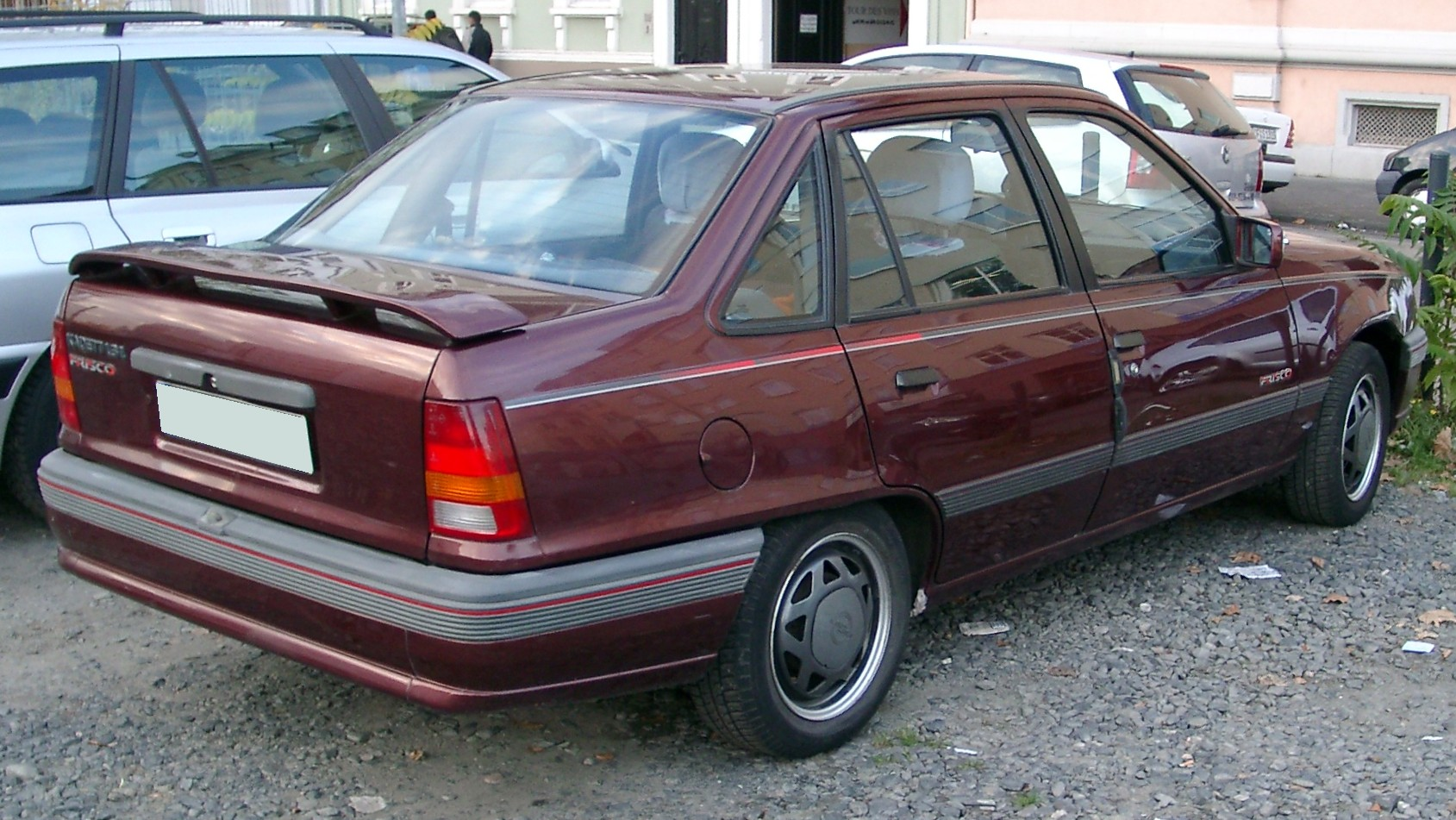
Opel Kadett saloon (1989–1991)

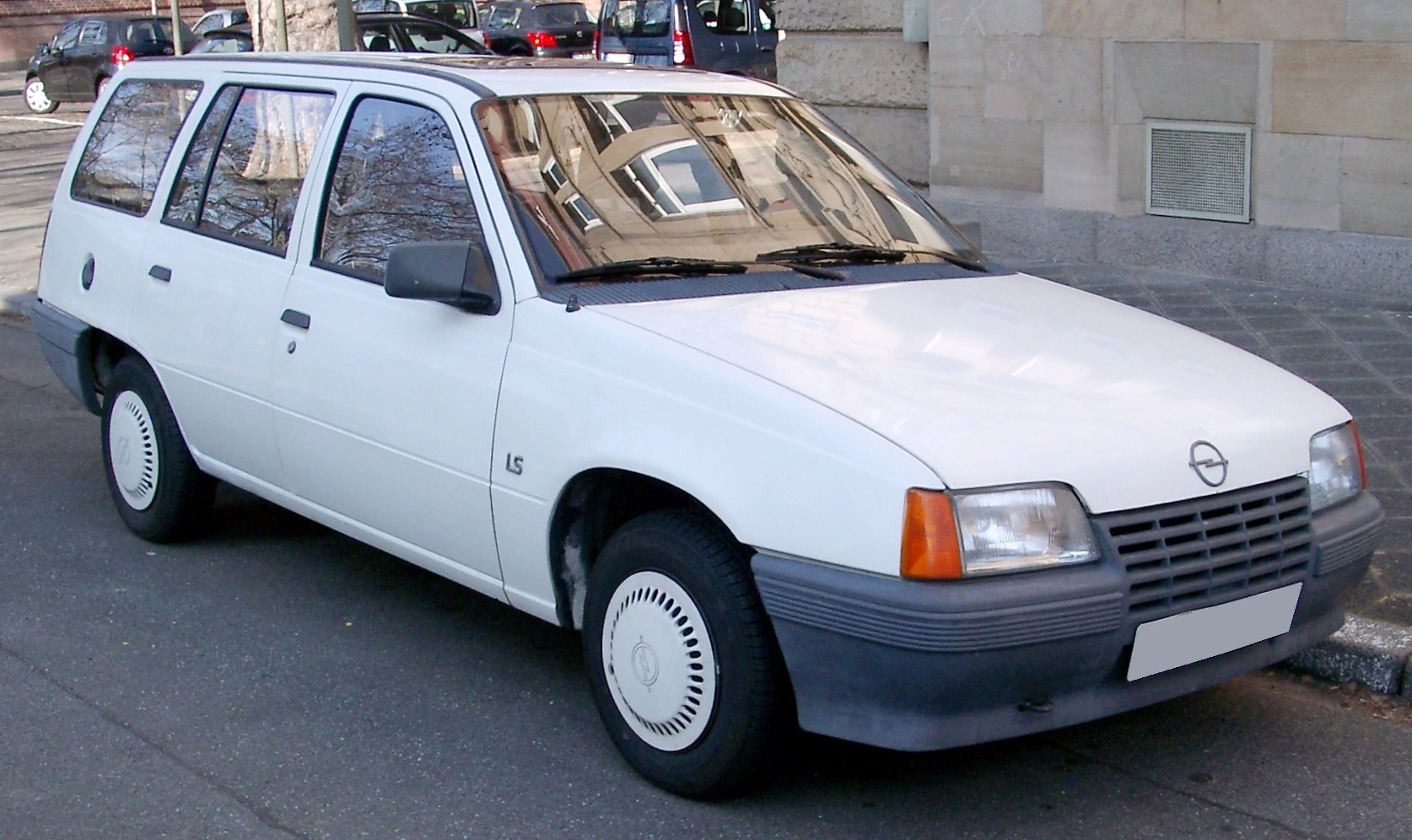
Opel Kadett Caravan (1984–1989)

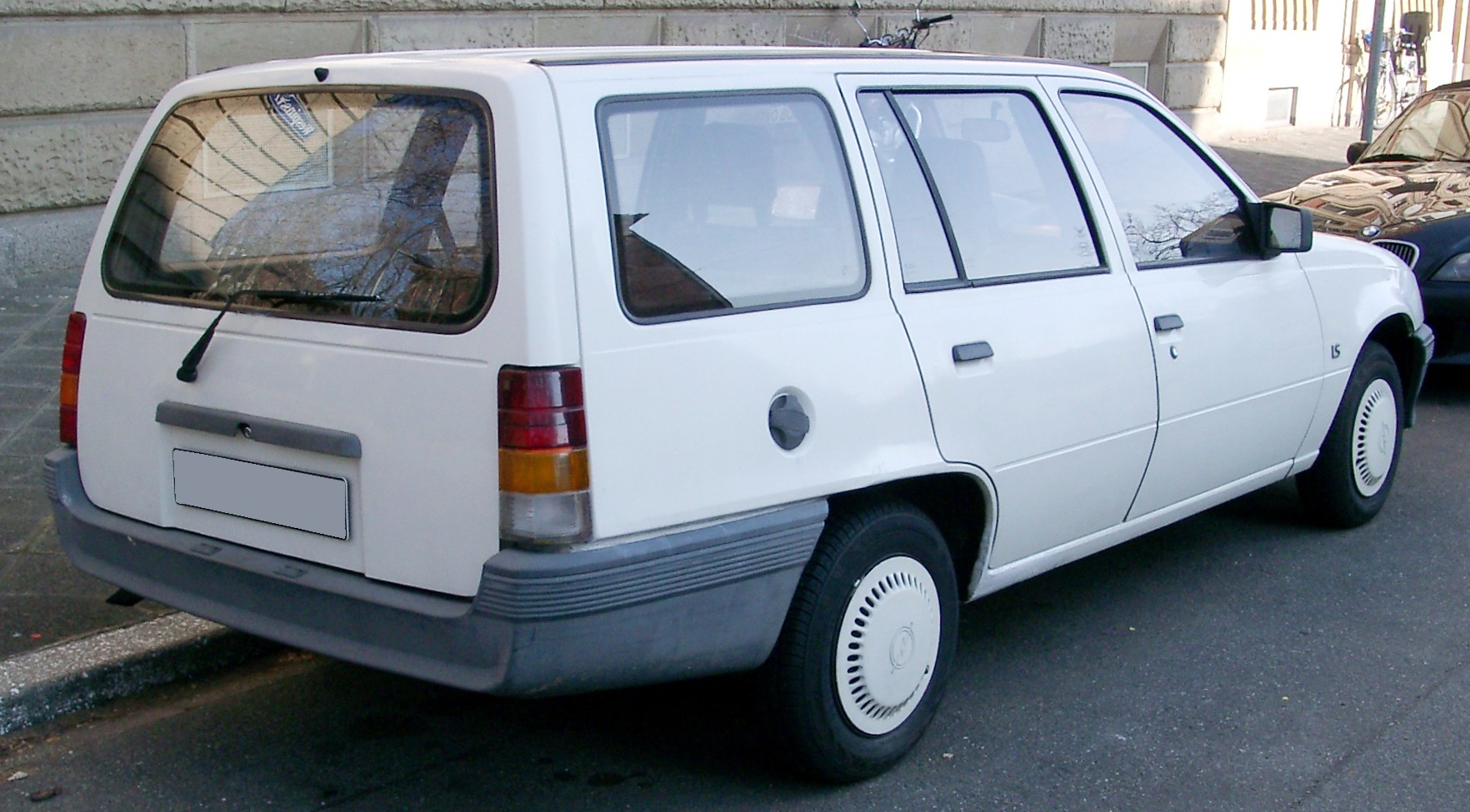
Rear

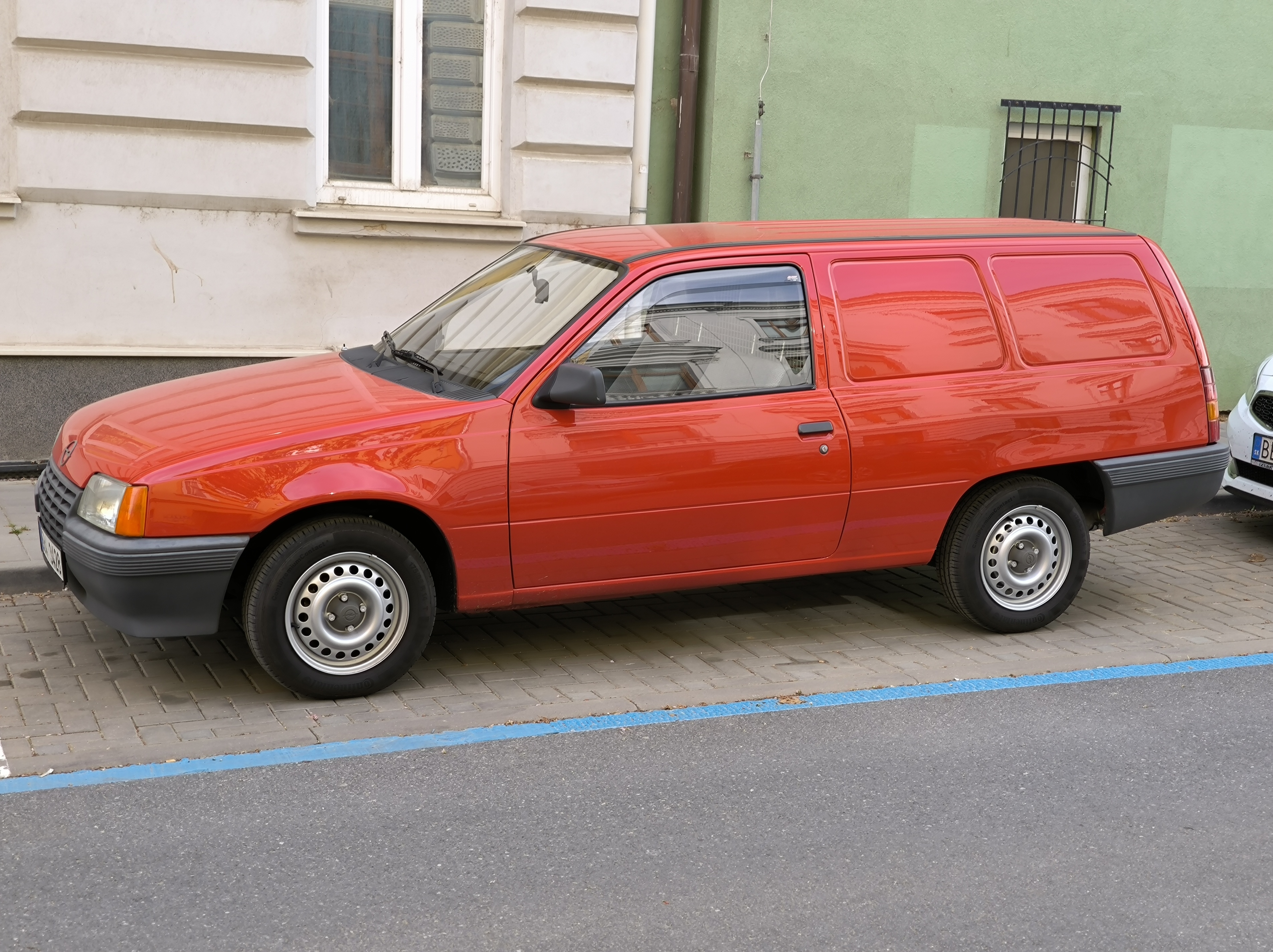
Opel Kadett Van (1984–1988)

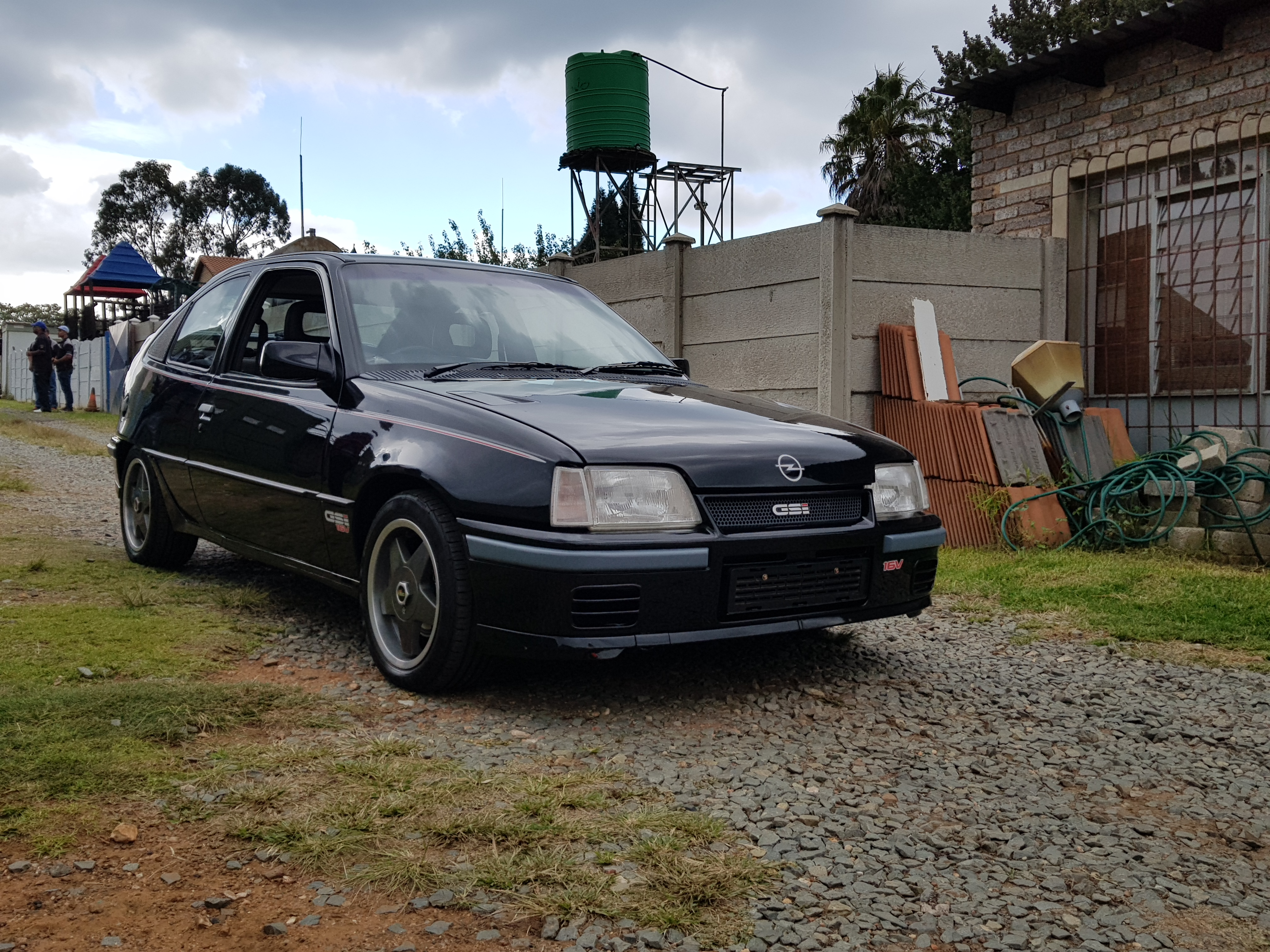
Opel Kadett GSI 16v S "Superboss"

== Other markets ==
=== South Africa ===
In the early 1990s, South African Kadett GSi 16v's were further upgraded based on their success in production car racing and 500 special units were built as road cars for homologation purposes. This was a minimum requirement for entry into the Stannic Group N races. They went against BMW's 325iS (A 2.7 L Alpina homologation special from BMW). They featured more aggressive 276-degree camshafts made by Schrick with 2 different settings for timing overlap (110° and 107°), revised intake and exhaust modifications (4-in-1 branch manifold and freeflow exhaust that eliminated the possibility of air conditioning), Irmscher spring kit, modified engine management system by Promotec, a limited-slip differential developed by Andre Verwey, F20 short ratio transmission and special Aluett 7Jx15-inch ET35 alloy wheels, they were nicknamed the "Superboss" and held the world record for the most torque per litre (114 Nm per litre) for a naturally aspirated production car until being beaten by the Ferrari 458 (117 Nm per litre) in 2009.

=== Chevrolet Kadett ===
Chevrolet Kadett
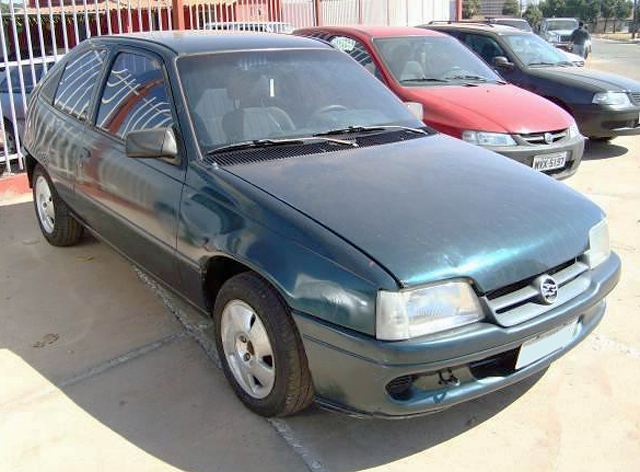

Overview
- Manufacturer: General Motors do Brasil
- Also called: Chevrolet Ipanema
- Production: 1989–1998
- Assembly: São José dos Campos, Brazil (1989–1996); São Caetano do Sul, Brazil (1996–1998)

Body and chassis
- Body style: 3/5-door hatchback 3/5-door estate 2-door convertible

Powertrain
- Engine: 1.8 L I4; 2.0 L I4

In Brazil, the Kadett E was branded as a Chevrolet and succeeded some versions of the Chevette, with the estate version called the Ipanema. The latter had three doors until the 1993 model year when five doors became mandatory. The hatchback was only available with three doors, and the saloon was never offered. Brazilian production of the hatchback commenced in April 1989, with the Ipanema being added in September. The original Opel Kadett E had been introduced late in 1984, and after it had received a facelift for 1989 the old style was adopted for Brazil. While the Ipanema clearly succeeded the Chevette-based Marajó estate, production of the Chevette (by now in saloon form only, the hatchback having been discontinued after the 1987 model year) and Kadett overlapped by several years; the newer model was placed above the old one in Chevrolet's lineup. While Chevrolet entertained the possibility of a pickup version of the Kadett E, it never materialized.

Originally the Kadett was available with a 1.8 or a 2.0 liter engine, shared with the Ascona-based Chevrolet Monza. The 1.8 has 95 PS (70 kW) and the 2.0 (gasohol-powered only) 110 PS (81 kW). The original versions were SL, SL/E, and GS, with the GS sporting 14 inch alloys and body-coloured bumpers. With a Cx of 0.30, the GS was the most aerodynamic car yet built in Brazil at this time. Along with some minor changes to the gearing and tires in June 1990, the 2.0 was introduced in a petrol version — which was downgraded to 99 PS (73 kW). It is likely that the claimed power was understated, but for tax reasons it was beneficial for Brazilian manufacturers to stay under the 100 horsepower mark at the time.

In September 1991, the German Kadett was replaced by the Opel Astra, but it continued on in Brazil. When catalytic converters became required, the engines were updated with fuel injection in 1992, and all gained a few horsepower. This was also when the 121 PS (89 kW) 2.0 GSi was added to the lineup, recognizable by a roof-mounted antenna, spoilers, alloys, and clear turn signals in front. For 1993, an automatic option was added and in April 1993, a more practical five-door Ipanema wagon was added to the lineup. The Ipanema also became available with the ethanol-fueled 110 PS (81 kW) 2-litre engine.

Between 1991 and 1994 the Cabriolet ("Kadett GSi Conversivel") was also marketed. The body-in-raw was shipped to Bertone in Italy to be turned into a convertible, then returned to Brazil to be finished — a six-month process. The Conversivel was only available with the same 2.0-litre multipoint electronic injection engine with 121 PS (89 kW) which was installed in the GSi. In 1990, as a tie-in with the Italia '90 World Cup, the "Kadett Turim" (Turin) was offered. The Ipanema was also sold in three special editions: the Wave, Sol, and Flair. These were offered in 1992, 1993, and 1994.

In 1994, the equipment levels SL and SL/E were changed to GL and GLS, in line with other new Brazilian Chevrolet products. In April 1994, for the 1995 model year, the car was updated with a new dashboard and the power window controls were moved from between the seats to the doors. The 1995 GLS and GSi were actually discontinued in 1994, as a lowered import tariff enabled Chevrolet to begin importing Belgian-built Astras. Tariffs again jumped (from 20 to 70%) in February 1995, and thus a Kadett 2.0 Sport was introduced as the Astra was no longer offered.

==== Facelift ====
Originally the Chevrolet Kadett looked identical to the early German version with the grille integrated to the bumper, but in 1996, the Kadett received a facelift with a separately inserted grille, at which time the Ipanema was discontinued. In April, the GLS version was reintroduced. The Kadett was manufactured in Brazil until 1998, although the Ipanema ended production earlier as it was replaced by the Corsa estate (introduced in 1997). Because of emssions regulations, for the last two years the Kadett was only available with the fuel injected 2-liter engine with 110 PS (81 kW). For 1998 only the Kadett 2.0 GLS remained.

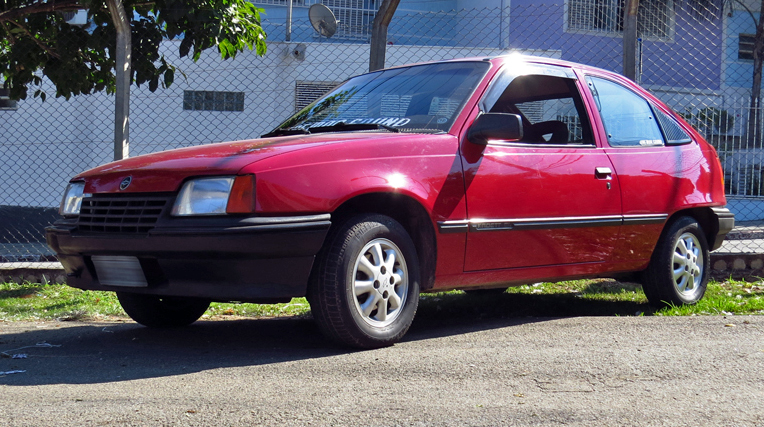
The original Chevrolet Kadett had a version of the original integrated grille (1989–1996)

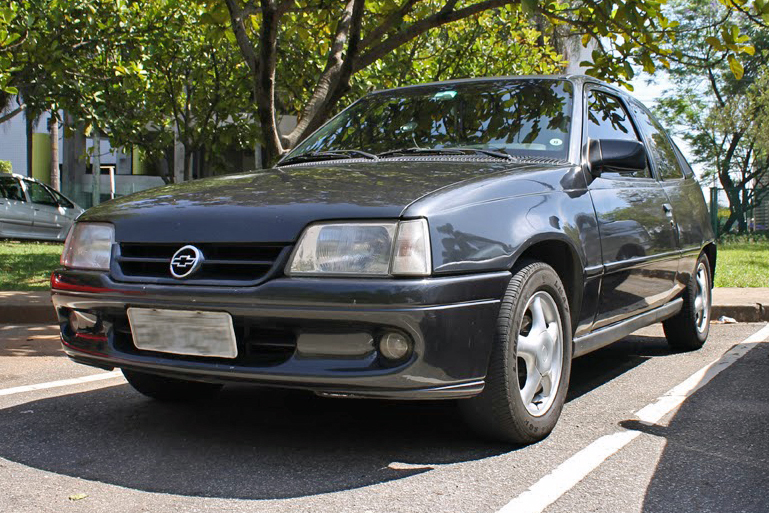
1996 facelift model, built until 1998

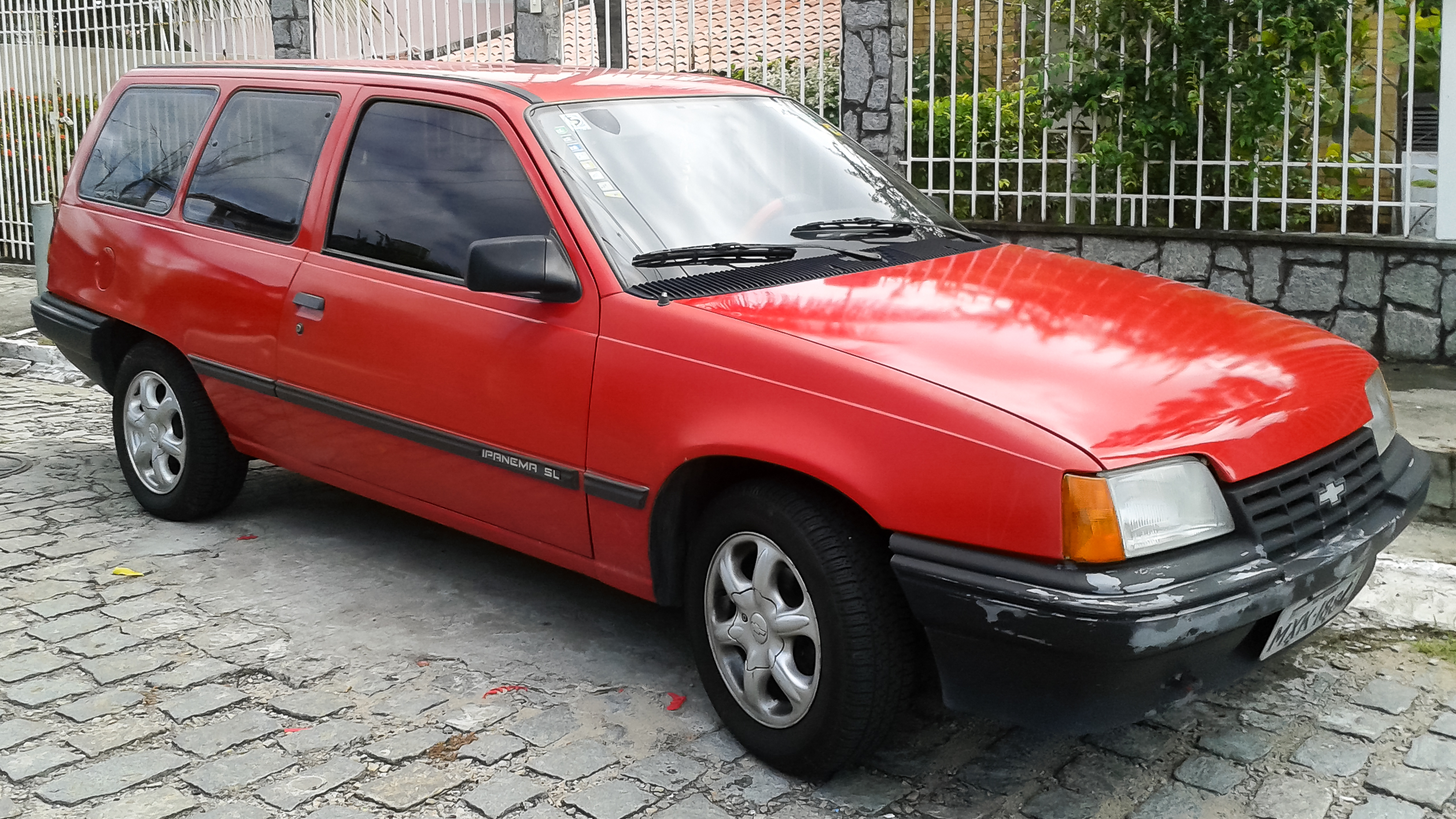
Chevrolet Ipanema, original version

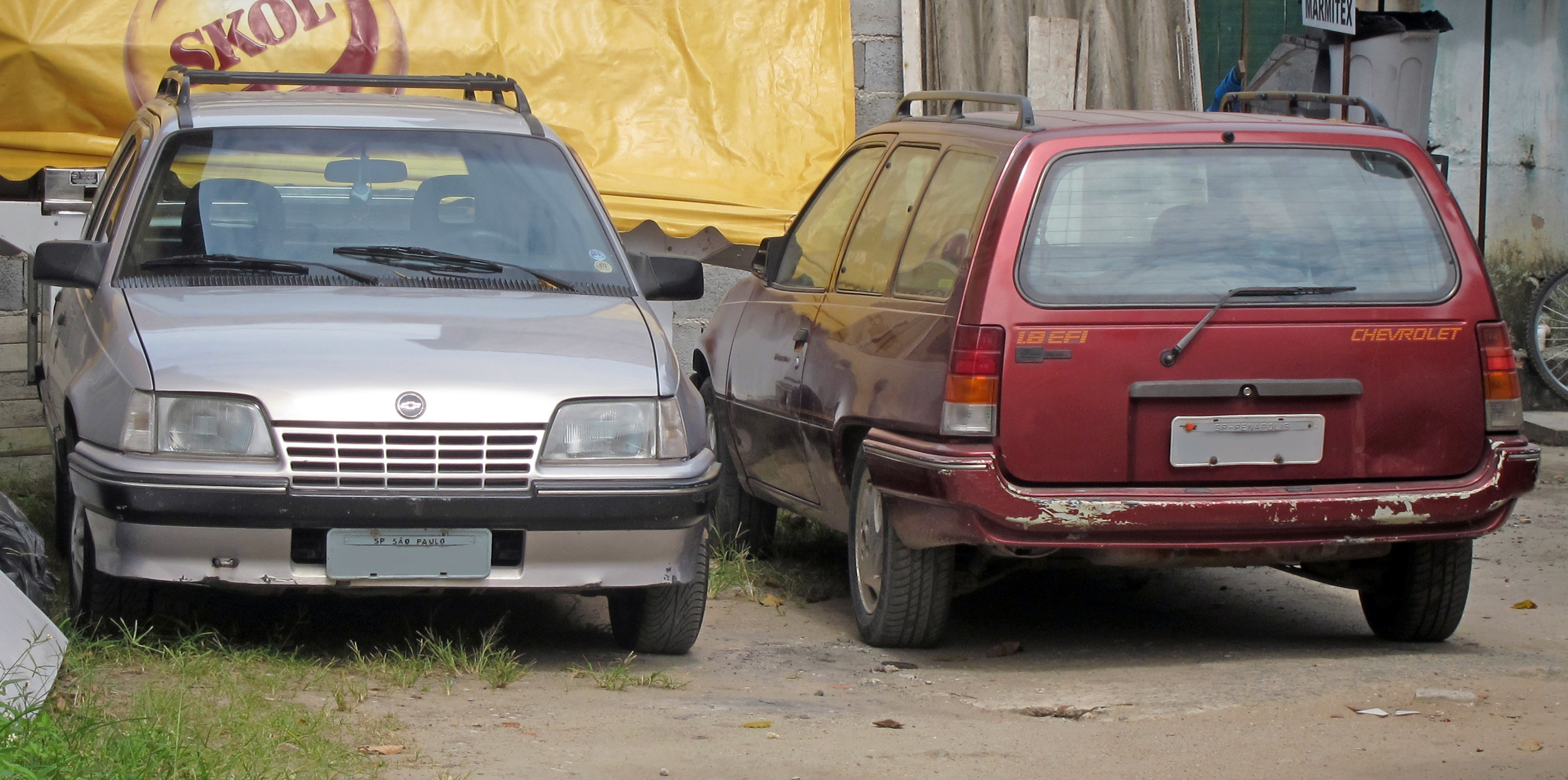
Two Chevrolet Ipanemas, a five-door and a three-door

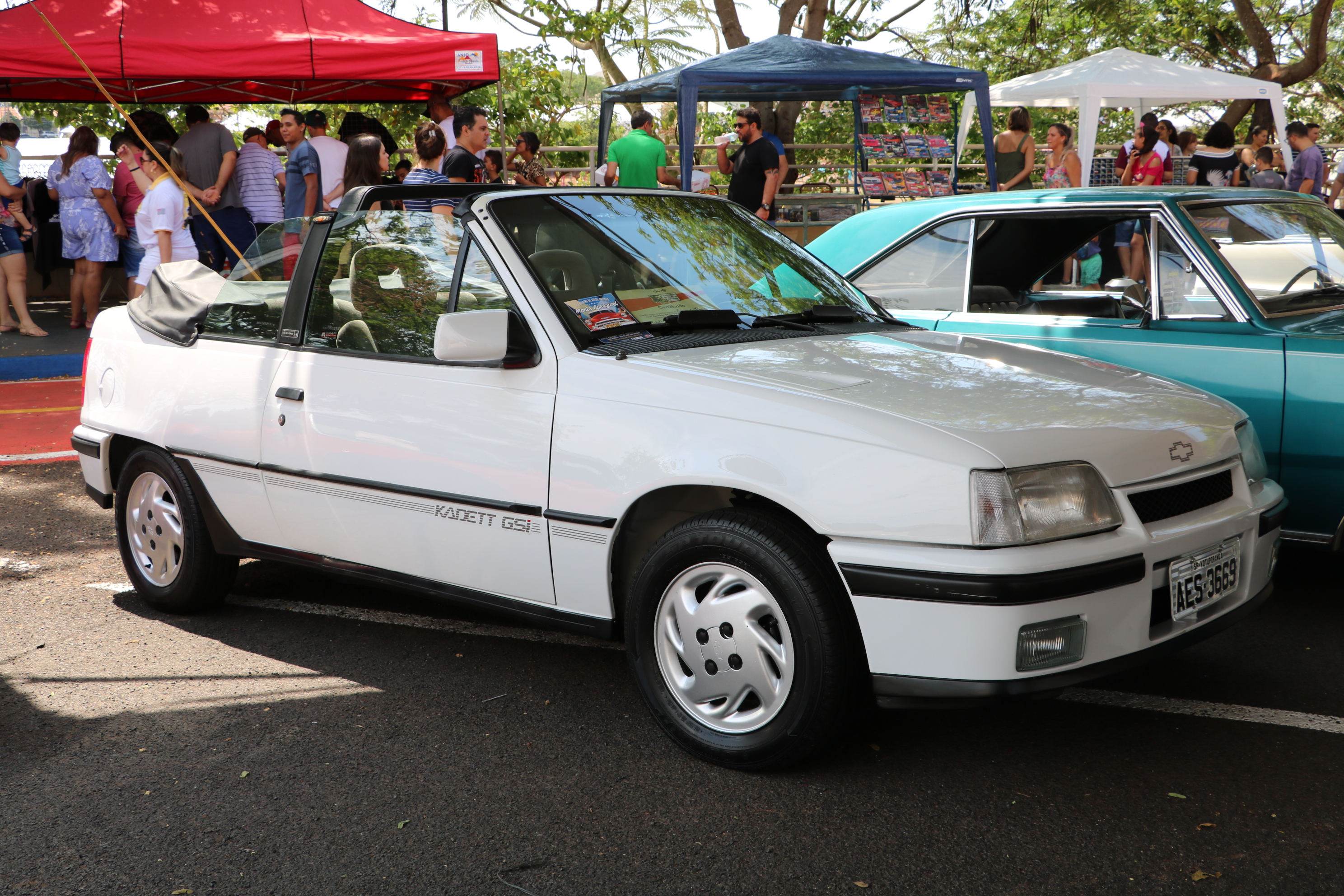
Chevrolet Kadett GSi cabriolet

=== Daewoo versions ===
The Kadett E formed the basis of the Daewoo LeMans (later known as the Daewoo Cielo, Racer and Nexia) in South Korea, Nexia being the hatchback version), which was sold in the United States and New Zealand as the Pontiac LeMans, and in Canada (initially) as the Passport Optima. LeMans sales ended in 1993. The Nexia was produced until 2016 at the UzDaewoo plant in Asaka, Uzbekistan. The Cielo was last being produced at Automobile Craiova, a semi-independent (from GM) plant in Craiova, Romania. Their license expired in the fall of 2006, and Cielo was produced until 2007.
