= GM Family II engine =

Family II engine
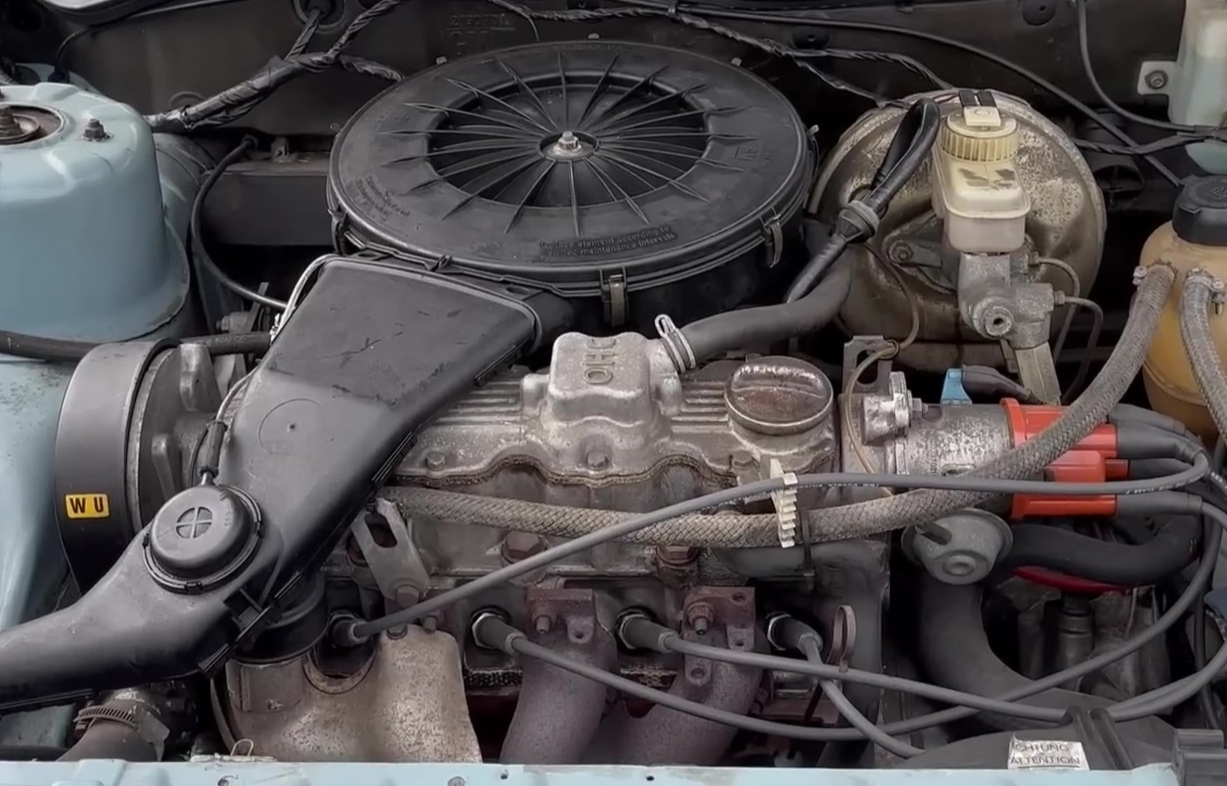
- Early GM Family II engine (16S) in a 1982 Opel Ascona C

Overview
- Manufacturer: General Motors
- Also called: D-TEC; Flex-Power; MultiPower; Big-block; Camtech
- Production: 1981–1999 (Opel); 1981–2009 (Holden); 1981–2016 (GM do Brasil)

Layout
- Configuration: Straight-4
- Cylinder block material: Cast iron
- Cylinder head material: Aluminium
- Valvetrain: SOHC 2 valves x cyl.; DOHC 4 valves x cyl.

Combustion
- Oil system: Wet sump
- Cooling system: Water-cooled

Chronology
- Predecessor: Opel CIH engine; Holden Starfire engine
- Successor: GM Ecotec engine (2.0 – 2.4 L); Family 1 engine (1.6 – 1.8 L)

The Family II is a straight-4 piston engine that was originally developed by Opel in the 1970s, debuting in 1981. Available in a wide range of cubic capacities ranging from 1598 to 2405 cc, it simultaneously replaced the Opel CIH and Vauxhall Slant-4 engines, and was GM Europe's core mid-sized powerplant design for much of the 1980s, and provided the basis for the later Ecotec series of engines in the 1990s.

The Family II shares its basic design and architecture with the smaller Family I engine (which covered capacities from 1.0 to 1.6 litres) – and for this reason the Family I and Family II engines are also known informally as the "small block" and "big block", respectively – although the 1.6 L capacity was available in either type depending on its fuelling system. GM's Australian arm Holden officially branded the engine as "Camtech 4".

The engine also spawned two diesel variants, the 1.6 L and 1.7 L.

The engine features a cast iron block, an aluminium head, and a timing belt driven valvetrain. The timing belt also drives the water pump. It was first used in the Opel Kadett D, Ascona C, and their corresponding Vauxhall sister models, the Astra and Cavalier II. Many General Motors subsidiaries, including Daewoo, GM do Brasil, GM Powertrain, and Holden have used this design.

Family II engines for the European and Australasian markets were manufactured by Holden at its Fisherman's Bend plant in Melbourne until 2009, whilst the Americas were supplied from the São José dos Campos plant in the São Paulo region of Brazil.

By 1986, the Family II unit had almost completely replaced the CIH engine as Opel/Vauxhall's core 4-cylinder engine – the CIH continuing only in 2.4L 4-cylinder format, and in all 6-cylinder applications in the Omega and Senator models until 1994.

The development track of these engines split in 1987, with the introduction of the 20XE; which featured a 16-valve DOHC head, with Holden production of the SOHC versions ending in 2009. Although SOHC versions stayed in production in Brazil, most DOHC engines were replaced by the all-aluminium GM Ecotec engine family.

In 2004, a 2.0 L MultiPower engine was made available for the taxi market which could use gasoline, alcohol, and natural gas.

== SOHC ==
SOHC
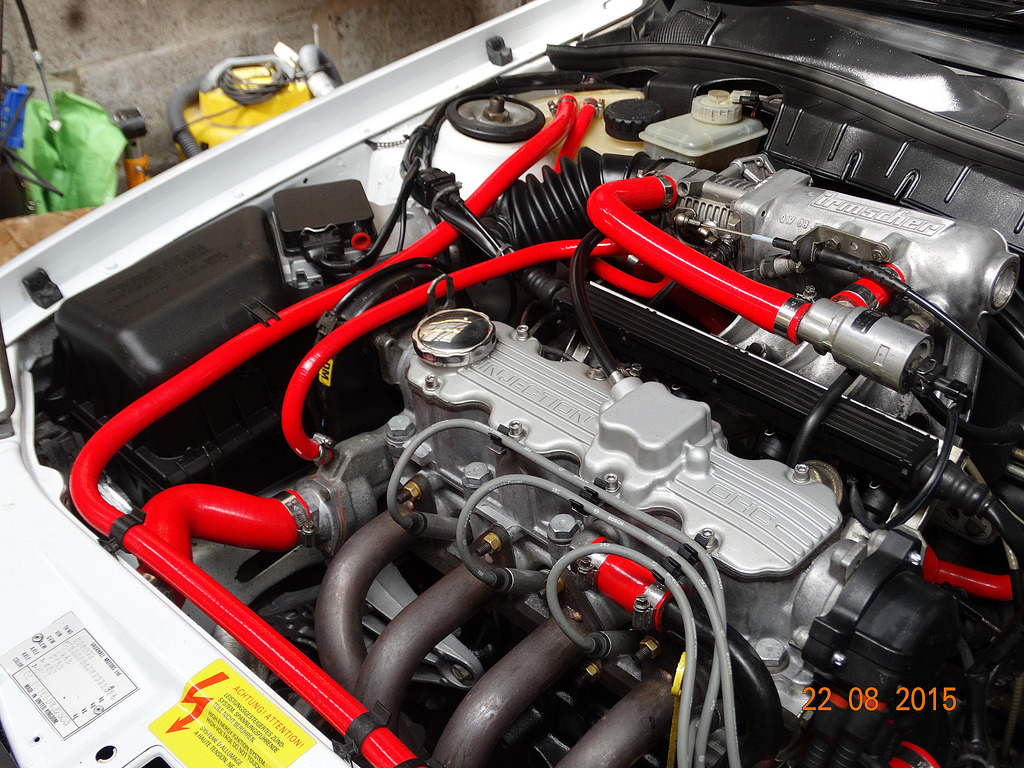
- Family II engine (20SEH) fitted to a Vauxhall Cavalier Mk3 (Opel Vectra A)

Overview
- Manufacturer: General Motors
- Also called: 8-valve
- Production: 1981–2009

Layout
- Displacement: 1,598 cc (97.5 cu in); 1,700 cc (103.7 cu in); 1,796 cc (109.6 cu in); 1,998 cc (121.9 cu in); 2,198 cc (134.1 cu in); 2,405 cc (146.8 cu in)
- Cylinder bore: 80.0 mm (3.15 in); 82.5 mm (3.25 in); 84.8 mm (3.34 in); 86 mm (3.4 in); 87.5 mm (3.44 in)
- Piston stroke: 79.5 mm (3.13 in); 86 mm (3.4 in); 100 mm (3.9 in)
- Valvetrain: Single overhead cam
- Compression ratio: 8.0:1; 9.2:1; 9.5:1; 10.0:1

Combustion
- Fuel system: Throttle-body fuel injection; Multi-point fuel injection
- Fuel type: Diesel; Gasoline; Ethanol

These engines formed the basis of the modern Family II lineup, starting with the 16SH (1600S) version in the Opel Kadett D/Ascona C (Vauxhall Astra Mk1/Cavalier Mk2) in 1981. Configuration was limited to a single over head cam, and two valves per cylinder in a cross flow layout (8 valves total). Superficially these engines look similar to the "small block" Family I engine; the key difference to aid identification is the position of the oil filter – on the Family I it is on the front face of the cylinder block, pointing towards front of the car, on the Family II it is adjacent to the crankshaft pulley pointing downward. The Family II also has a more sophisticated crankcase breathing circuit, with an additional pipe that runs from the crankcase to the camshaft box, with a further pipe running from a small plenum chamber on the rocker cover.

The 1.8-liter versions appeared first in carburetted form (18N) in 1982 and later also in injected (18LE) and further forms. The 2-liter 20NE was introduced in 1986 for the Opel Omega A (Vauxhall Carlton Mk2) and Ascona C3 (Vauxhall Cavalier Mk2c) and served as the base from which the updated 20SEH, and ultimately the 20XE/C20XE "Red Top". The final versions of this engine, labelled Ecotec, evolved from this engine as well.

Early Family II engines had a reputation for rapid camshaft and follower wear (a trait shared with the smaller Family I engine), the problem afflicted Kadett D/Astra I and Ascona C/Cavalier II vehicles fitted with the engine. Improved metallurgy of both the cam lobes and followers, combined with a change to the lubrication specification eventually solved the issue.

Another known issue on the Family II was for the water pump to become jammed into its mounting due to corrosion if the engine was run with no antifreeze; the pump is mounted into an eccentric shaped aperture so it can also function as the timing belt tensioner. If the pump cannot turn then the belt cannot be tensioned. Later versions of the engine were equipped with a separate jockey pulley to combat the issue.

=== 1.6 ===
The 1.6-liter iteration (1,598 cc or 97.5 cu in) has an 80.0 mm (3.15 in) bore and a 79.5 mm (3.13 in) stroke. Opel began production of the 1.6-liter engine in 1980. A diesel fueled version also became available. The diesel produced 54 PS (40 kW) at 4600 rpm and 70.8 lb⋅ft (96.0 N⋅m) of torque at 2400 rpm. It also had a 23:1 compression ratio and a Bosch injection pump. The diesel featured valves that rotate, increasing durability.

Engine	Power	Torque	Compression Ratio	Fuel Delivery	Engine Management	Applications
16LF	72 hp (53 kW ) at 5200 rpm with Ethanol 73 hp (54 kW) at 5400 rpm with Gasoline	12.6 kgfm (124 Nm) at 2600 rpm with ethanol 12.3 kgfm (121 Nm) at 3000 rpm with Gasoline	12:1 with Ethanol 8:1 with Gasoline	Carburetor single barrel Weber 190 or brosol h 35 alfa1 Ethanol/Gasoline		1982–1984 Holden Camira (JB) 1984–1985 Holden Camira (JD); 1987–1991 Nissan Pulsar (N13) (Australia); 1987–1989 Holden Astra (LD); 1982–1986 Chevrolet Monza (South America)
16SH	66 kW (90 PS; 89 hp) at 5800 rpm	126 N⋅m (93 lb⋅ft) at 3800–4200 rpm		GM Varajett II		Opel Kadett D Opel Ascona C Opel Kadett E
16D/16DA	40 kW (54 PS; 54 hp) at 4600 rpm	96 N⋅m (71 lb⋅ft) at 2400 rpm		Bosch VE		1982–1988 Opel Ascona; 1982–1989 Opel Kadett

=== 1.7 ===
The 1.7-liter iteration (1,700 cc or 103.7 cu in) has an 82.5 mm (3.25 in) bore and a 79.5 mm (3.13 in) stroke.
The engine uses diesel fuel, and uses indirect injection.

Engine	Power	Torque	Compression Ratio	Fuel Delivery	Engine Management	Applications
17D	42 kW (57 PS; 56 hp)	105 N⋅m (77 lb⋅ft) at 2400 rpm	23:1	Bosch injection pump	Mechanical Indirect	1988–1991 Opel Kadett; 1991 Opel Astra; 1988–1991 Opel Vectra
17DR	44 kW (60 PS; 59 hp)	105 N⋅m (77 lb⋅ft) at 2650 rpm	23:1	Lucas injection pump	Mechanical Indirect	1988–1991 Opel Kadett; 1992–1998 Opel Astra; 1992–1995 Opel Vectra
X17DTL	50 kW (68 PS; 67 hp)	132 N⋅m (97 lb⋅ft) at 2400 rpm	22:1	Various	Mechanical Indirect	1994–2000 Opel Astra

=== 1.8 ===
The 1.8-liter iteration (1,796 cc or 109.6 cu in) has an 84.8 mm (3.34 in) bore and a 79.5 mm (3.13 in) stroke. It was first available in the facelifted Opel Manta B in May 1982, and quickly made its way into a number of other Opel and GM cars. It was originally available as the 18N and the 18S, for low and high octane petrol respectively. The C18NV was first installed in the Opel Rekord E2 from May 1985 and was one of the first catalysed mass market automobiles sold in Germany (and Europe). The Family II engines in a longitudinal installation (for rear-wheel drive) have one major design difference from their transverse mounted counterparts – the distributor is driven by a small drivebelt from the camshaft timing sprocket rather than directly off the transmission end of the camshaft, which on the Manta B and Rekord E2 (both older vehicles that had originally been designed around the CIH engine) would have meant the distributor fouling the firewall or being impossible to service.

In 1983, the 1.8 L engine was added to certain North American market J-cars; the engines were imported from Brazil. The LA5 (RPO code) is a turbocharged version that was optional in the North American market from 1984.

Engine	Power	Torque	Compression Ratio	Fuel Delivery	Engine Management	Applications
18E S18E	85 kW (115 PS) at 5800 rpm	151 N⋅m (111 lb⋅ft) at 4800 rpm	9.5:1	Multipoint fuel injection	(Bosch LE-Jetronic)	1982–1986 Opel Ascona; Opel Kadett D; Opel Kadett E
18LE	79 kW (106 hp) at 5,600 rpm (catalyst)	151 N⋅m (111 lb⋅ft) at 3,600 rpm	8.8:1	Multipoint fuel injection		1984– mid 1986 Holden Camira (JD); 1987.07-1991 Nissan Pulsar (N13) (Australia); 1987.07–1989.07 Holden Astra (LD); 1990–1998 Daewoo Espero
18N	62 kW (84 PS) at 5400 rpm	135 N⋅m (100 lb⋅ft) at 3000 rpm	8.2:1	Pierburg 2E3		1989-1988 Opel Ascona; Opel Rekord E2
18SE	87 kW (118 PS) at 5400 rpm	160 N⋅m (120 lb⋅ft) at 3200 rpm	10.0:1	Multipoint fuel injection		1995–1999 Opel Optima (Indonesia)
E18NV	62 kW (84 PS) at 5400 rpm	143 N⋅m (105 lb⋅ft) at 2600 rpm	9.2:1	Pierburg 2EE		Opel Manta B; Opel Rekord E; Opel Ascona C3; Opel Vectra A (1988–1989)
C18NE	74 kW (100 PS) at 5800 rpm	140 N⋅m (100 lb⋅ft) at 3000 rpm	8.9:1	Multipoint fuel injection	(Bosch LU-Jetronic)	1985.05–1986.08 Opel Ascona C Opel Kadett E
C18NZ	66 kW (90 PS; 89 hp) at 5400 rpm	145 N⋅m (107 lb⋅ft) at 3000 rpm	9.2:1	Monopoint fuel injection	(Multec)	1990–1991 Opel Kadett 1992–1994 Opel Astra; 1992–1994 Vauxhall Astra 1992–1995 Vauxhall Cavalier; 1992–1995 Opel Vectra
LH8	63 kW (84 hp) at 5200 rpm	138 Nm (102 lb-ft) at 2800 rpm	9:1	Throttle-body fuel injection		1982–1986 Pontiac Sunbird; 1982–1986 Buick Skyhawk; 1982–1986 Oldsmobile Firenza
LA5	112 kW (150 hp) at 5600 rpm	204 NM (150 lb-ft) at 2800 rpm	8:1	Multi-port fuel injection turbocharged		1984–1986 Pontiac Sunbird; 1984–1986 Buick Skyhawk

=== 2.0 ===
The single overhead camshaft 1,998 cc (121.9 cu in) inline four cylinder engines feature a square 86 mm (3.4 in) bore and stroke. They also feature fuel injection, an aluminium crossflow cylinder head with a belt-driven overhead camshaft, electronic ignition, a six-bolt flywheel, and a 6,400 rpm redline. Originally, developed by Opel, these engines have been used in Brazilian market vehicles, Korean market vehicles and North American market vehicles; with the first versions appearing in 1981, although did not start appearing in European Opel/Vauxhall models until 1986 – firstly in the Omega A and then in the facelift Ascona C3 for the 1987 model year.

The North American versions were used primarily in the J-body compact cars from 1983 through 1994 although the turbocharged version did make a brief appearance in the N-body Pontiac Grand Am. The SOHC version also appeared in the Opel Kadett E-based, Daewoo produced, Pontiac LeMans for the US market. In the Brazilian market these engines are still built under the FlexPower name. Differences between the engines are usually emissions related. However, the 20SEH version was more powerful version produced for Opel's sportier models such as the Ascona GT and Kadett GSi, (their corresponding Vauxhall sisters being the Cavalier SRi 130 and the Astra GTE); it featured a more aggressive camshaft, and high compression pistons.

The LT3 (RPO code) or C20GET is a turbocharged version produced in Brazil for the North American market. It featured brilliant red powder coating on the camshaft cover, intake manifold and boost pipe. The engine was equipped with a water-cooled Garrett T-25 turbocharger; however it did not use an intercooler. Maximum boost at WOT was 9 psi (62 kPa).

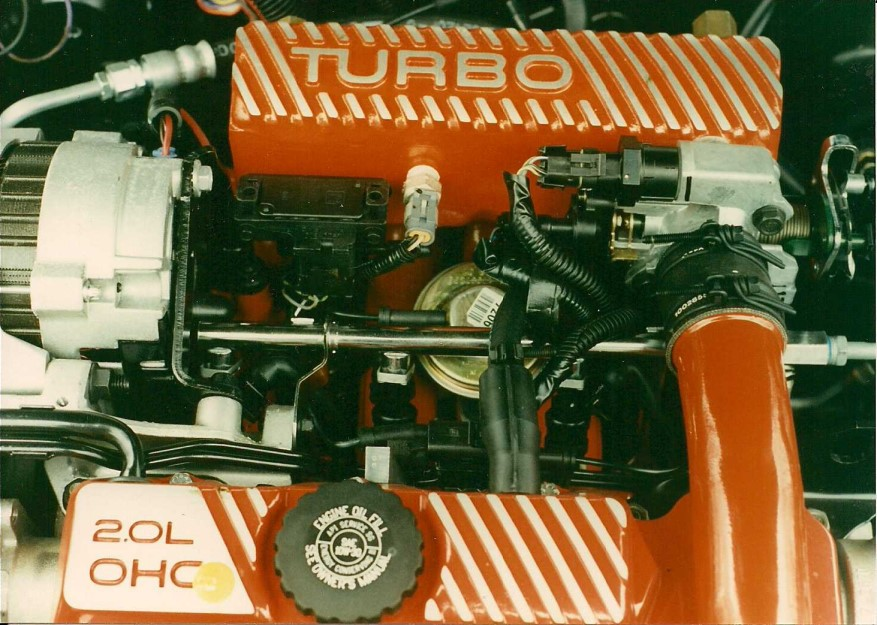
LT3 in a 1990 Sunbird GT

Engine	Power	Torque	Compression Ratio	Fuel Delivery	Engine Management	Applications
20LE						1987–1989 Holden Camira (JE)
20NE	115 PS (85 kW) at 5200 rpm	175 N⋅m (129 lb⋅ft) at 2600 rpm	9.2:1	Multipoint fuel injection	Motronic ML 4.1	1987– Opel Kadett; 1987– Opel Omega; 1987–1991 Vauxhall Cavalier; Opel Calibra; Opel Ascona C
20SE	122 PS (90 kW) at 5400 rpm	175 N⋅m (129 lb⋅ft) at 2600 rpm	10.0:1	Multipoint fuel injection	Motronic ML 4.1	1987– Opel Omega; Holden Commodore (VN)
20SEH	127–130 PS (93–96 kW) at 5600 rpm	180 N⋅m (130 lb⋅ft) at 4600 rpm	10.0:1	Multipoint fuel injection	Motronic ML 4.1; Motronic 1.5.4	Opel Astra; Opel Ascona C GT; Opel Kadett E GSi; Opel Vectra A GT; 1988–1992 Vauxhall Cavalier SRi
C20NE	115 PS (85 kW) at 5200 rpm	170 N⋅m (130 lb⋅ft) at 2600 rpm	9.2:1	Multipoint fuel injection	Motronic M1.5; Motronic M1.5.2	Opel Astra; Opel Vectra; 1991–1994 Vauxhall Cavalier; Opel Calibra; Opel Frontera A
X20SE	115 PS (85 kW) at 5200 rpm	178 N⋅m (131 lb⋅ft) at 2800 rpm	10.0:1	Multipoint fuel injection	Motronic M1.5.4	Opel Omega
LT2	96 hp (72 kW)	160 N⋅m (118 lb⋅ft)		Throttle body fuel injection		1987–1988 Buick Skyhawk; 1987–1988 Oldsmobile Firenza; 1988–1990 Passport Optima; 1989–1990 Pontiac LeMans GSE Hatchback; 1987–1991 Pontiac 2000/Sunbird
LE4	110 hp (82 kW) at 5200 rpm	167 N⋅m (123 lb⋅ft) at 3600 rpm		Multi-Port Fuel Injection		1992–1994 Pontiac Sunbird
LT3	165 hp (123 kW) at 5600 rpm	175 lb⋅ft (237 N⋅m) at 4000 rpm	8.0:1	Multi-Port Fuel Injection		1987–1990 Pontiac Sunbird; 1987–1989 Pontiac Grand Am SE; 1987 Buick Skyhawk T-Type

=== 2.2 ===
The 2.2 L or 2,198 cc (134.1 cu in) version has an 86mm (3.38 in) bore and a 94.6mm (3.7 in) stroke. It is codenamed C22NE and 22LE.

It was mainly used in the Brazilian market, in the Opel Omega A (Chevrolet Omega in Brazil) with 116 hp and the Opel Vectra B (Chevrolet Vectra in Brazil) with 123 hp. This engine replaced the 2.0 8v C20NE (116 hp) version that was considered weak when fitted to cars like Omega and Vectra, by the Brazilian market, however 2.2L Omega A's for the European market continued to use the older CIH engine, rather than the Family II.

Applications:

- Opel Omega
- Opel Vectra
- Isuzu Faster
- FS Lublin, modified C22NED engine

=== 2.4 ===
The 2,405 cc (146.8 cu in) version has an 87.5 mm (3.44 in) bore and a 100 mm (3.9 in) stroke.

- C24SE – 2.4 L SOHC – Isuzu Rodeo (C24SE built by Holden)
- X24XF— 2.4 L MPFI SOHC 8V FlexPower

== DOHC ==
DOHC
- C20LET "Red Top" engine fitted to an Opel Kadett E GSi (Vauxhall Astra Mk2 GTE)

Overview
- Manufacturer: General Motors
- Also called: "Red Top"/ XE; TWIN-TEC; Ecotec
- Production: 1987–2014

Layout
- Displacement: 1,799 cc (109.8 cu in); 1,998 cc (121.9 cu in); 2,198 cc (134.1 cu in); 2,405 cc (146.8 cu in)
- Cylinder bore: 81.6 mm (3.21 in); 86 mm (3.4 in); 87.5 mm (3.44 in)
- Piston stroke: 86 mm (3.4 in); 94.6 mm (3.72 in); 100 mm (3.9 in)
- Valvetrain: Double overhead cam

Combustion
- Fuel system: Multi-port fuel injection
- Fuel type: Gasoline

The first naturally aspirated DOHC 16-valve version of the 2.0 L— 1,998 cc (121.9 cu in)—cast-iron-block engine was introduced in 1988 – derived from the SOHC 2.0L (20SEH) engines (appearing first in the Opel Kadett E GSi/Vauxhall Astra Mk2 GTE, and later the Opel Vectra A/Vauxhall Cavalier Mk3 GSi 2000) – coming in either non-catalysed (20XE) or catalysed (C20XE) versions. The engine is commonly nicknamed the Red Top (or just "XE") because of the appearance of the red L-shaped spark plug cover (black colours were available too; the rocker cover was available in silver only).

1994 saw the introduction of the Ecotec series – which again consisted of a DOHC 16-valve cylinder head (this time co-developed with Lotus) mounted atop a development of the Family II block. The 2-liter versions therefore became the X20XEV, now producing 136 hp (101 kW) and taking on the GM Ecotec name. In its final, 1999 iteration, it became the X20XER. unlike the original 20XE/C20XE these were intended more for mainstream application (as opposed to racing and high-performance applications) in response to tightening emissions standards, and to reflect the overall family car market moving towards multivalve technology as was being increasingly found in competing vehicles.

Again, these engines have no commonality with the later GM Ecotec engine introduced in 1999, and first used in the Opel Vectra B, which are to a completely different design to the Family II.

=== Coscast ===
This lineup features the same block as the SOHC engines with an 86 mm (3.4 in) bore and stroke and a Cosworth-developed timing belt-driven double overhead camshaft (DOHC) 16 valve cylinder head (Cosworth Project KB). The cylinder heads were cast and assembled by either Cosworth or, as demand increased, Kolbenschmidt. In general, the heads from this lineup are supposed to flow appreciably better than their Lotus successors.

The 20XE came into production in 1987. The engine was designed by Cosworth, UK. The engine was originally intended for race application, hence Cosworth's involvement. At the time of its launch, this engine was something of a milestone unit in Europe and was widely used in motorsport in many specialist race versions.

The engine had a low optimum specific fuel consumption of 232 g/kWh which is equivalent to a maximum efficiency of 37%; a better efficiency than some of the diesel engines that were available at the time of its release. The valves are set at 46° and are accompanied by pistons with shallow valve pockets – thereby eliminating the need for a shorter connecting rod hence, allowing a suitable compression ratio to be achieved. Long spark plugs are used and positioned concentric to the cylinder. Power output was rated at 157 bhp. The later engine were suffixed C20XELN to indicate "Low Noise" revisions (smaller cylinder head port, cast pistons, and different crank bearing size) in line with EU regulations

In 1988 the C20XE was introduced, and was fitted with a catalyst and oxygen sensor in the exhaust. This was due to new emission standards, which forced manufacturers to equip their cars with a catalytic converter and a lambda or oxygen sensor – this requirement permitted the fitment of the Bosch Motronic 2.5 engine management system. Engine power output dropped to 150 PS (110 kW). Vauxhall complied with the new emission controls in 1988, although the legislation wasn't law until 1991. Vehicles fitted with the C20XE engine produced before 1991 can have their catalytic converter legally removed, and the vehicle will still comply with MOT regulations.

The C20LET engine was introduced in 1992, and was fitted to the Opel/Vauxhall Vectra Turbo/Cavalier Turbo, Calibra Turbo, and the South African made Opel Astra 200t S. It is similar to the C20XE, apart from the primary addition of a KKK-16 turbocharger, forged Mahle pistons, Bosch Motronic M2.7 electronic engine control unit, and black plastic plenum/'top hat' shroud with a "turbo" script. It produces a DIN rated output of 150 kW (201 hp), and generates 280 newton-metres (207 lbf⋅ft) of torque. Boost pressure is 0.6 bars (8.7 psi) continuous with a 0.8 bars (12 psi) overboost.

Some versions of the engine implemented switchable Traction Control (commonly included in the early Astra GSi models). The inlet had a secondary throttle valve sandwiched underneath the primary throttle body. This is closed by a motor/arm assembly when the traction control ECU senses loss of grip/spin at the wheels. The engine was also equipped with a different throttle position sensor (six pin, as opposed to three), and a different coolant temperature sensor (which was black, as opposed to the normal light blue colour).

The engines that appeared in the early 1990s also swapped the cast metal spark plug cover for a cheaper (and less regarded) plastic version. Those used round tooth cambelts while the later used square (with a plastic pre-tensioner). There are also subtle differences between the crankshaft, and visible difference in the pattern of the SFi airbox.

In its last version before production ended, the C20XE came with a new engine management system which included a distributorless ignition system, namely Bosch Motronic 2.8. The last version was called C20LN (Low Noise) and has a stronger engine block.

==== Porosity issues ====
In 1991, the Coscast cylinder head was replaced with the GM cylinder head which was manufactured by Kolben-Schmidt. One of the most prominently recognized qualities of the Coscast head is its inherent lack of porosity; this was achieved by pumping the liquid metal into the mold rather than pouring it, hence, minimizing the presence of tiny air bubbles that usually form during the standard casting process. The Coscast head can be identified by a Coscast logo which is stamped under the 3rd exhaust port and a ridge on the head under the distributor.

The GM head was a poured casting, and featured a slightly different oil/water gallery design. These design changes required that a pair of Welch plugs be pressed in at either end of the head. In situations where a complete C20XE is still fitted to a vehicle, the presence of Welch plugs (or lack of) has proven to be the sole means of differentiating between GM and Coscast heads. A reinforced version of the GM head became available in the later years of the C20XE; however, these reinforcements meant that it had smaller inlet/exhaust channels than the other two.

Since an engine's oil circulates at much higher pressures than its coolant, oil in a porous head has a tendency to gradually seep into the coolant galleries. A typical symptom of a porous head is usually a 'mayonnaise'-like substance forming somewhere inside the cooling system (usually, this can be found residing on the coolant reservoir cap). However, depending on the degree of porosity, symptoms of a porous head have a tendency to vary. Many C20XE operators have described the symptom as a curry-like residue or in more severe cases, a thick brown sludge which may overcome the entire cooling system. In such instances, engine oil will readily react with the sulfur in rubber components, hence quickly degrading coolant pipes and hoses to the point of failure. During the porous head debacle, GM faced bankruptcy – therefore dealers failed to recall affected models. Due in part, to the engine's immense prominence and demand, many businesses now specialize in the repair of porous GM C20XE/LET heads – by either sleeving the affected gallery or by injecting a polymer based substance into the porous region. Reportedly, a small number of total GM C20XE cylinder heads ever exhibited significant symptoms of porosity.

==== Motorsport ====
The C20XE has seen extensive use in motorsport. Typical uses for the engine have ranged from hillclimb events, to open wheel racing categories. Despite its age, it remains the powerplant of choice for many Formula 3 teams and has most recently found acclaim in the Australian F3 scene where Tim Macrow, the 2007 Australian F3 champion, drove an Opel-Spiess powered car to claim victory. Tuned by Spiess, an F3 grade C20XE is easily capable of producing 250 bhp (190 kW) in its naturally aspirated form. Many aftermarket tuners have further developed the C20XE for racing purposes. The C20XE was used by the Chevrolet WTCC (World Touring Car Championship) team and the Lada WTCC team. The engine was also an option in Westfield kitcars. The engine is a favourite for both N/A and turbo motoring enthusiasts for its robust design, materials and construction

Engine	Power	Torque	Compression Ratio	Fuel Delivery	Engine Management	Applications
20XE	115 kW (156 PS)	203 N⋅m (150 lb⋅ft)	10.5:1	Sequential multi-port fuel injection	Bosch Motronic 2.5 (no catalytic converter)	Opel Kadett; Opel Vectra
C20XE	110 kW (150 PS) at 6000 rpm	196 N⋅m (145 lb⋅ft) at 4600 rpm	10.5:1	Sequential multi-port fuel injection	Bosch Motronic 2.5; Bosch Motronic 2.8	1989–1994 Opel Calibra; 1988–1992 Opel Kadett; 1988–1995 Opel Vectra; 1991–1996 Opel Astra
C20LET	150 kW (204 PS) at 5600 rpm	280 N⋅m (207 lb⋅ft) at 2400 rpm	9.0:1	Sequential multi-port fuel injection	Bosch Motronic 2.7	Opel Astra 200t S; Opel Calibra A Turbo; Opel Kadett 200t S; Opel Vectra A Turbo

=== Ecotec branded models (in association with Lotus) ===
==== 1.8 ====
The X18XE was branded as Ecotec. All these engines feature an 81.6 mm (3.21 in) bore and an 86.0 mm (3.39 in) stroke.

==== 2.0 ====
The X20XEV is the first Family II engine branded as Ecotec, a mass-market successor to the C20XE with a Lotus-developed cylinder head. The new cylinder head had a smaller valve angle compared to the older C20XE, to give more torque in the lower revs. It is a 1,998 cc (121.9 cu in) naturally aspirated engine with 16 valves and belt driven double overhead camshafts (DOHC). 86 mm (3.4 in) bore and stroke in cast-iron OHC-derived cylinder block and aluminium cylinder head. The X20XEV was equipped with exhaust gas recirculation (EGR) to reduce nitrogen dioxide emissions and air injection reactor (AIR) to speed up the warming up of the catalytic converter and to reduce unburnt hydrocarbons and carbon monoxide. The engine is rated at 100 kW (136 PS; 134 bhp). A higher output version called the X20XER produced 118 kW (158 hp) at 6500 rpm and 188 N⋅m (139 lb⋅ft) at 4300 rpm.

The Z20LET is a turbocharged version of the X20XEV for the Opel Astra G and features an 8.8:1 compression, 200 PS (147 kW; 197 hp) and 195 lb⋅ft (264 N⋅m) of torque. From 2005, the Z20LET engine was revised for the Astra H and Zafira B, to three different model designations, Z20LEL, Z20LER and Z20LEH. The differing designations denote the engine power output, 170 PS (125 kW; 168 hp), 200 PS (147 kW; 197 hp) and 240 PS (177 kW; 237 hp). Further revisions to the original design include under-piston oil cooling, a revised turbocharger unit and the deletion of the contra-rotating balancer shafts in the 240 hp (179 kW) Z20LEH engine (as used in the Astra VXR), to reduce mechanical losses. The Z20LEH also features high quality Mahle forged pistons, which are much stronger than the cast pistons fitted to the Z20LET, Z20LEL and Z20LER.

The 2.0-litre X20SED D-TEC 16 Valve DOHC MPFi was built by Holden and used in the Daewoo Nubira.

The L34 also known as the U20SED is a 2.0 L (1,998 cc (121.9 cu in)) engine that was built until 2009 by Holden in Australia, dubbed D-TEC by GMDAT (the new Daewoo after the buyout from GM) or E-TEC II by Chevrolet (GM). It has an 86.0 mm (3.39 in) bore and stroke. Power is rated at 120 PS (88 kW; 118 hp) in South America and Europe, 126 hp (94 kW; 128 PS) in Canada, and 132 hp (98 kW; 134 PS) in the United States; all are at 5400 rpm and torque is rated at 126 lb⋅ft (171 N⋅m). The engine has been used on the Daewoo Lacetti and its various rebadged models, such as the Chevrolet Optra, Suzuki Reno, and Suzuki Forenza.

This engine was discontinued in 2010 and new generation open deck engines replaced starts with a prefix of the letter A e.g. A20NHT A20NHH A20NFT….

Engine	Power	Torque	Compression Ratio	Fuel Delivery	Engine Management	Applications
X20XEV	136 PS; 134 hp (100 kW)	185 Nm at 4000 rpm	10.8:1		Siemens Simtec 56.1/56.5/70	1994–2002 Opel Astra; 1995–1997 Opel Calibra; 1994–2003 Opel Omega; 1994–2002 Opel Vectra
X20XER	160 PS (118 kW; 158 hp)	188 N⋅m (139 lb⋅ft) at 4300 rpm	10.8:1		Siemens Simtec 70	1999–2001 Opel Astra OPC
Z20LET	200 PS (147 kW; 197 hp)	267 N⋅m (197 lb⋅ft)	8.8:1	Sequential multi-port fuel injection	Bosch Motronic ME1.5.5	2001–2004 Vauxhall Astra Coupe Turbo; 2002 Vauxhall Astra SRi Turbo; 2003–2004 Vauxhall Astra GSi; Vauxhall Zafira GSi; Vauxhall VX220 Turbo; Opel Astra OPC; Opel Zafira OPC; Opel Speedster Turbo
Z20LEL	170 PS (125 kW; 168 hp)	262 N⋅m (193 lb⋅ft)	8.8:1	Sequential multi-port fuel injection	Bosch Motronic ME7.6	2004–2010 Vauxhall Astra; 2004–2010 Vauxhall Zafira; 2004–2010 Opel Astra; 2004–2010 Opel Zafira
Z20LER	200 PS (147 kW; 197 hp)	262 N⋅m (193 lb⋅ft)	8.8:1	Sequential multi-port fuel injection	Bosch Motronic ME7.6	2004–2010 Vauxhall Astra SRi Turbo; 2004–2010 Vauxhall Zafira SRi Turbo; 2004–2010 Opel Astra; 2004–2010 Opel Zafira; Lotus Europa S
Z20LEH	240 PS (177 kW; 237 hp)	320 N⋅m (236 lb⋅ft)	8.8:1	Sequential multi-port fuel injection	Bosch Motronic ME7.6	Vauxhall Astra VXR; Vauxhall Zafira VXR; Opel Astra OPC; Opel Zafira OPC
X20SED				Multi-port fuel injection		1998–2005 Daewoo Nubira 1997–2007 Daewoo Leganza
U20SED (L34)	119–132 hp (89–98 kW) at 5400 rpm	126 lb⋅ft (171 N⋅m)				1998–2000 Buick Century (China); 1999–2008 Buick Regal (China); 2006–2009 Chevrolet Epica (China); Daewoo Magnus; Suzuki Forenza; Suzuki Reno

==== 2.2 ====
The 2.2 L engine was a derivative of the GM Family II engine introduced in 1995 built by Holden in Australia that saw usage first in Australian and European versions of Isuzu-derived trucks and SUVs, and was later used in the Isuzu Rodeo and Daewoo Leganza. The X22XE was also used in the Opel/Vauxhall Sintra (1996–1999). The 2.2-liter shares many details together all listed below:

- Bore: 86.0 mm
- Stroke: 94.6 mm
- Volume: 2198 cc

X22XE

- Power: 100 kW (136 hp) at 5,200 rpm, 104 kW (141 hp) at 5400 rpm (Sintra)
- Torque: 202 N⋅m (149 lb⋅ft) at 2,600 rpm
- Compression ratio: 10.5:1
- Engine management: Bosch Motronic M 1.5.4
- Octane requirement: 91/95/98, with knock control
- Control: timing belt
- Exhaust system: AGR, regulated catalytic
- Properties: balance shafts

Y22XE (used on Omega, 1999–2003)

- Power: 107 kW (145 hp) at 5,400 rpm
- Torque: 205 N⋅m (151 lb⋅ft) at 4,000 rpm
- Compression ratio: 10.5:1
- Engine management: Siemens Simtec 71
- Octane requirement: 91/95/98, with knock control
- Control: timing belt
- Exhaust system: AGR, regulated catalytic
- Properties: balance shafts, electronic throttle, cruise control

Z22XE (used on Omega, 1999–2003)

- Specifications as Y22XE, but meets Euro IV emissions regulations.

Further applications:

- Isuzu Faster
- Isuzu MU/Isuzu Amigo (1995–2004)
- Opel/Vauxhall Frontera (1998–2004)
- Honda Passport (1998–2002)
- Opel Omega
- Opel Blazer (Indonesian market)

==== 2.4 ====
- X24SFD—2.4 L (2405 cc) SFI DOHC 16V – Chevrolet Astra, Chevrolet Vectra

- 150 hp at 5200 rpm
- 228 Nm at 4000 rpm

- Z24XE—2.4 L (2405 cc) DOHC – Chevrolet Captiva, Opel Antara (2006–2010), this engine was built by Holden until 2009. The 2006 Chevrolet Vectra also received a 2.4 L 16V FlexPower engine.

- 100–103 kW (136–140 hp) at 5200 rpm
- 220 N⋅m (160 lb⋅ft) at 2200 rpm

== See also ==
- Family 1 engine
- List of GM engines
