= Chevrolet Monza (South America) =

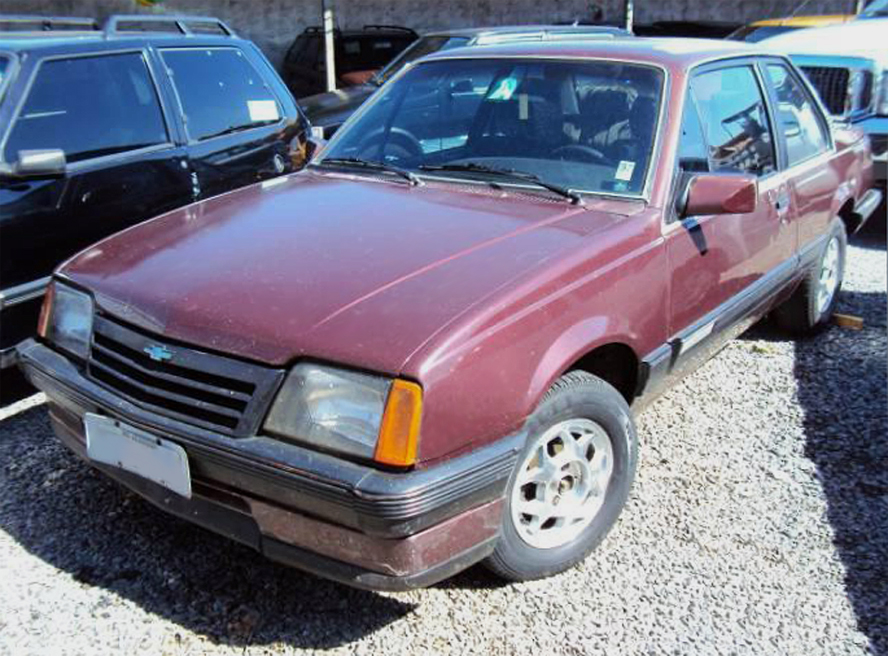
- A 2-door saloon

Overview
- Production: 1982–1996
- Assembly: Brazil: São Caetano do Sul; Venezuela: Valencia, Carabobo; Colombia: Bogotá

Body and chassis
- Class: Mid-size car / Large family car (D)
- Body style: 3-door hatchback 2/4-door saloon
- Layout: FF layout
- Related: Opel Ascona C

Powertrain
- Engine: 1,598 cc GM Family II I4; 1,796 cc GM Family II I4; 1,998 cc GM Family II I4
- Transmission: 4/5-speed manual 3-speed automatic

Dimensions
- Wheelbase: 2,574 mm
- Length: 4,264 mm (hatchback); 4,366 mm (saloon); 4,493 mm (saloon, facelift)
- Width: 1,668 mm
- Height: 1,385 mm (hatchback); 1,395 mm (saloon)

Chronology
- Successor: Chevrolet Vectra

The Chevrolet Monza is a large family car which was manufactured from 1982 to 1996 by General Motors do Brasil.

== History ==
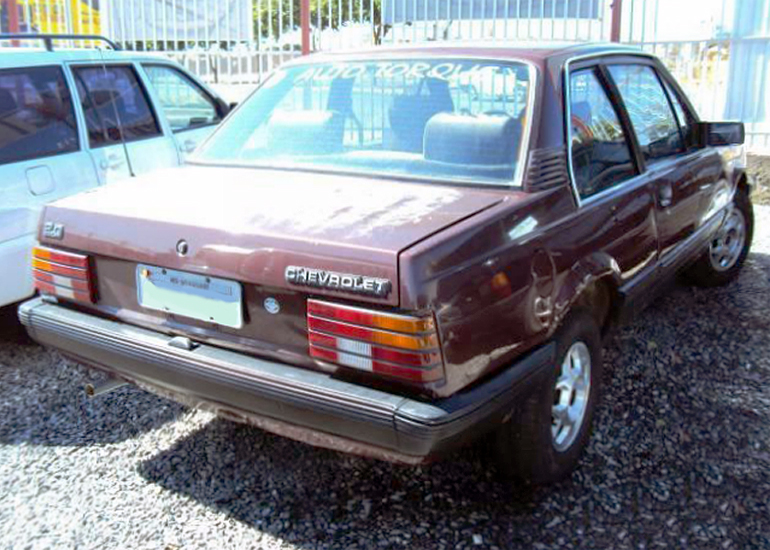
Rear view of a 2-door saloon

Less than a year after the debut of the Opel Ascona C in Europe, General Motors decided to expand the market reach of its global sibling models based on the J platform to include South American markets. Thus, in the spring of 1982, the Chevrolet Monza debuted in Brazil, a local variant of the Ascona, differentiated only by the manufacturer's emblems.

During its first year of production, the Brazilian Chevrolet Monza was only available as a 3-door hatchback with a 1.6 petrol engine with 73 hp or ethanol with 72 hp, in the basic and SL/E versions. Initially, the 1.6 version did not offer performance worthy of the new car, not to mention the use of a four-speed gearbox. Weighing 1,030 kg, it accelerated from 0 to 100 km/h in around 16 seconds and reached a top speed of 150 km/h. In 1983, it gained a 1.8 petrol engine option with 86 hp due to criticism regarding its modest performance. With this engine, it achieved an acceleration from 0 to 100 km/h in 14 seconds and a top speed of 160 km/h. In 1983, the line was completed with 2-, and 4-door saloon versions. Chevrolet also considered launching a 3-door estate car with a rear identical to that of the North American Chevrolet Cavalier, among others, but the project never went beyond the prototype stage.

The Monza first went on sale in Colombia in 1985 in a 4-door saloon body style, assembled locally by GM Colmotores. In Colombia, a top of the line saloon version was sold from 1987 to 1992 as the Monza Classic with a three-speed automatic transmission. In Venezuela it was assembled and sold from 1985 to 1990.

At the end of 1985, the Monza hatchback gained a sports version, called the S/R. It arrived with a 1.8 engine and some modifications such as a double-barrel carburetor, a more aggressive camshaft, a new intake manifold, and a less restrictive exhaust. The exchange rate had shorter ratios. The car came with specific wheels, black paint on the lower part, and a rear spoiler. Inside, there are Recaro seats, a dashboard with distinctive lighting, and a shorter gearshift lever. The engine delivered 106 hp and a maximum torque of 15.3 kgfm. Acceleration from 0 to 100 km/h was 11 seconds, and the top speed was 180 km/h. The S/R lasted until 1989.

Shortly after the S/R, the more luxuous Classic version arrived. More refined, it offered two-tone paint options, fog lights, spoked alloy wheels, a double carburetor (increasing power to 99 hp), and a complete equipment package (which included options from the SL/E).

In 1986, for the 1987 model year, the 2.0 engine option was introduced, and the 1.6 engine option was discontinued. The 2.0 engine delivered 110 hp of power and 17.3 kgfm of torque. The acceleration was from 0 to 100 km/h in just over 11 seconds.

After the end of European production in 1988 of its sibling, the Opel Ascona, in favor of the new Vectra, Chevrolet's Brazilian subsidiary continued production. That same year, production of the Monza hatchback also ceased.

In 1988, a facelift was introduced: new bumpers with integrated spoilers, new headlights, and a redesigned front grille. The interior gained a new height-adjustable steering wheel. The trim levels became SL, SL/E, and Classic SE.

The Monza 500 EF, which paid homage to Emerson Fittipaldi, arrived on the market in 1990 with a more luxurious interior, leather seats, and a removable cassette player. It was the first in the range with fuel injection and the second among all national cars, after the Volkswagen Gol GTi

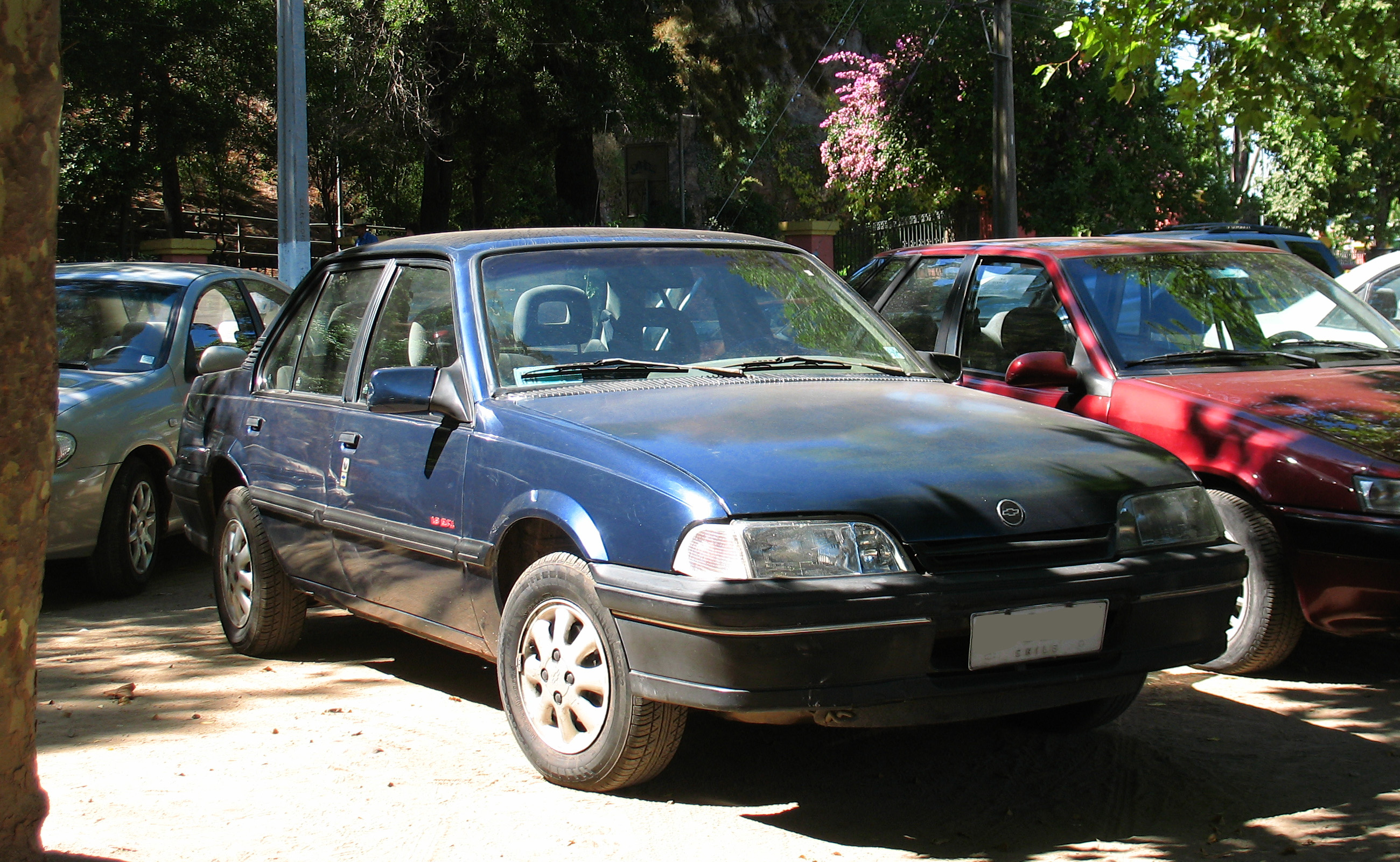
1995 4-door saloon

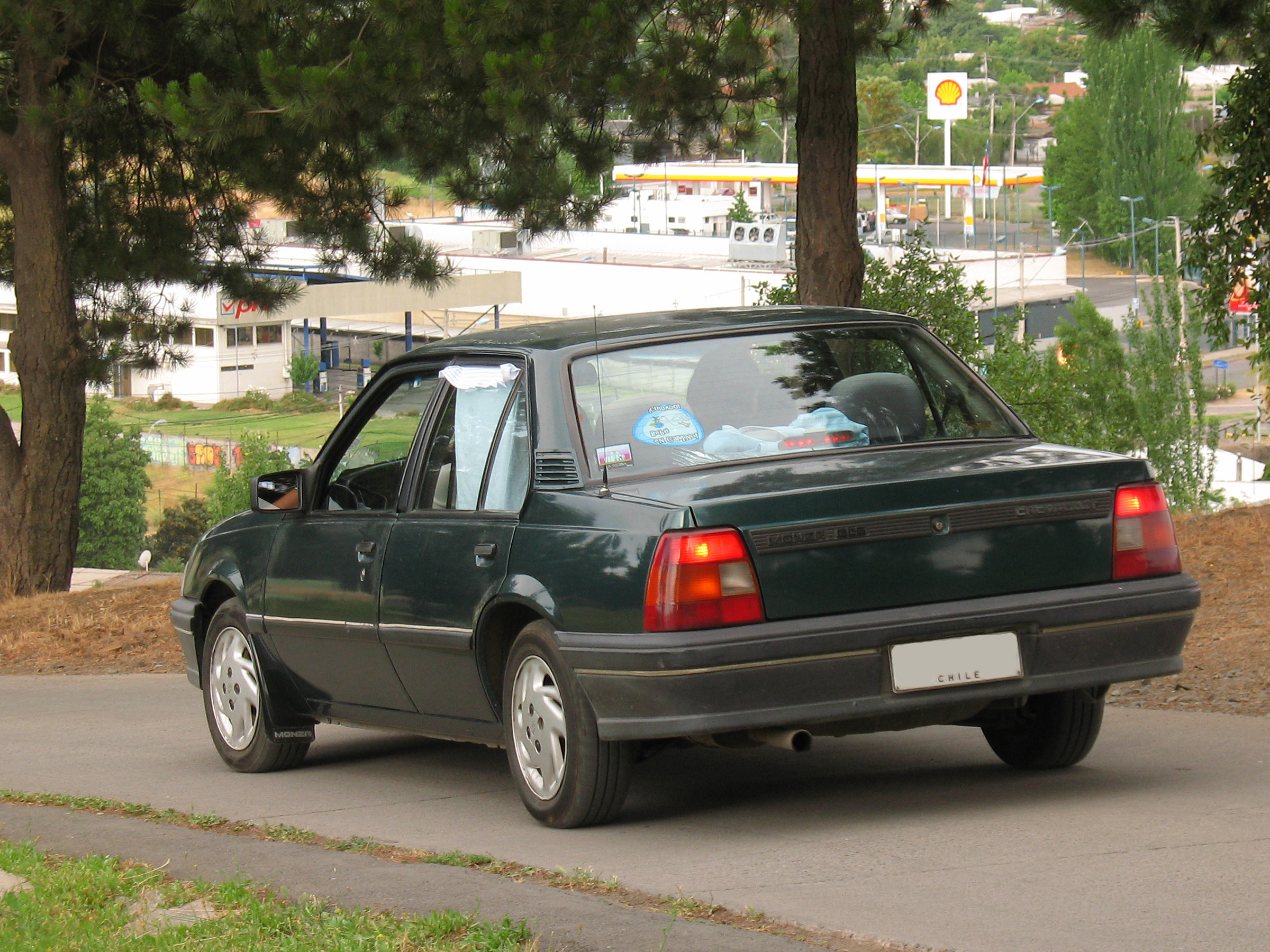
Rear view of a 1996 4-door saloon

In late 1990, for the 1991 model year, the Chevrolet Monza underwent a significant new facelift, known as "tubarão" (shark), for the local market, altering both the front and rear. The Monza received a new grille, headlights, bumpers, taillights, hood, wings, trunk lid, and rear window.

The rear license plate was moved from the middle of the taillights to the bumper, giving the rear of the car a different visual appearance, along with the completely new taillights.

The car grew 14 cm in length. At the rear, the trunk was raised, which provided an additional 55 liters of luggage capacity (increasing from 510 to 565 litres).

The Classic came standard with 14-inch alloy wheels, leather-wrapped seats and steering wheel, digital instrument panel, trip computer, and analog multipoint fuel injection – the same system used in the 500 EF.

In late 1991, the Monza began to feature fuel injection across its entire range.

With EFI injection, the engines gained power: the 1.8 now produced 99 hp (ethanol and gasoline) and a maximum torque of 16.0 and 14.6 kgfm, respectively. The 2.0 generated 116 hp and 110 hp, with a maximum torque of 16.6 and 18.0 kgfm, respectively.

=== End ===
The South American Chevrolet Monza was produced for a total of 14 years, finally being discontinued in 1996 in favor of a completely new successor. Once again, it was a localized version of the European Opel model, this time under the name Chevrolet Vectra.

== Gallery ==
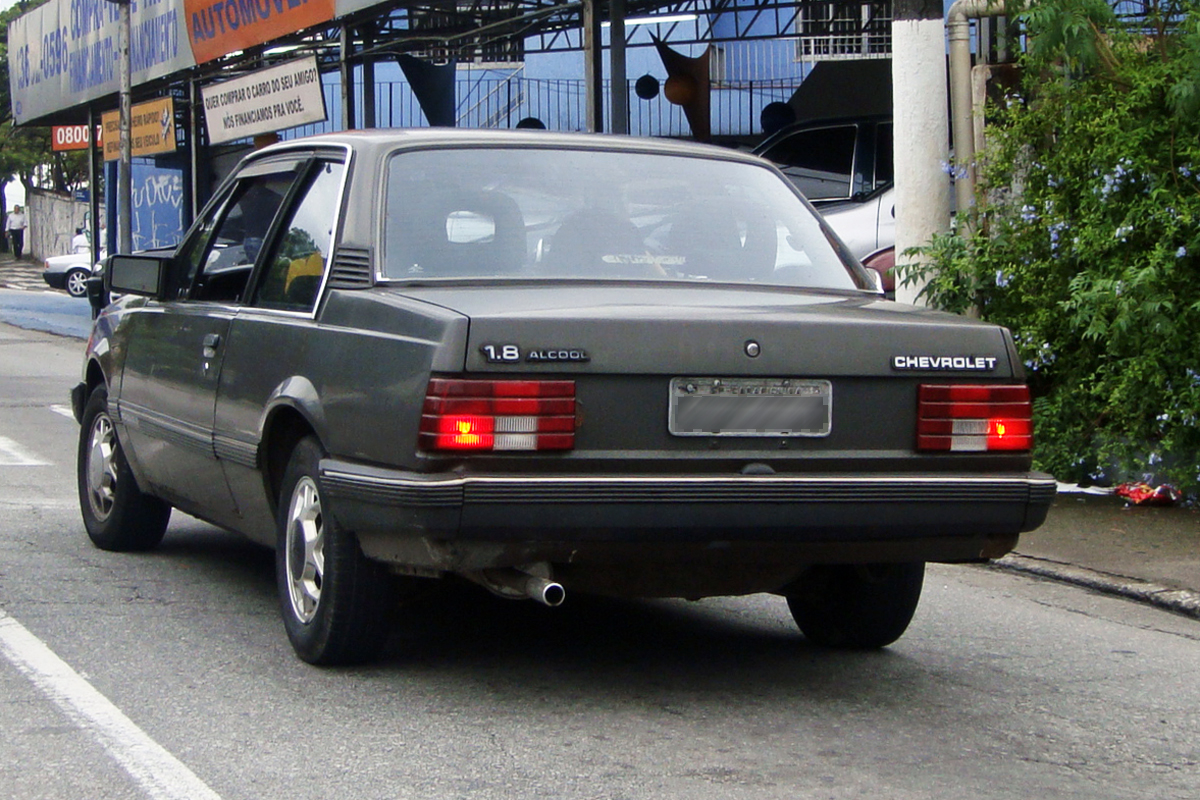
Pre-facelift Chevrolet Monza two-door sedan (rear view)

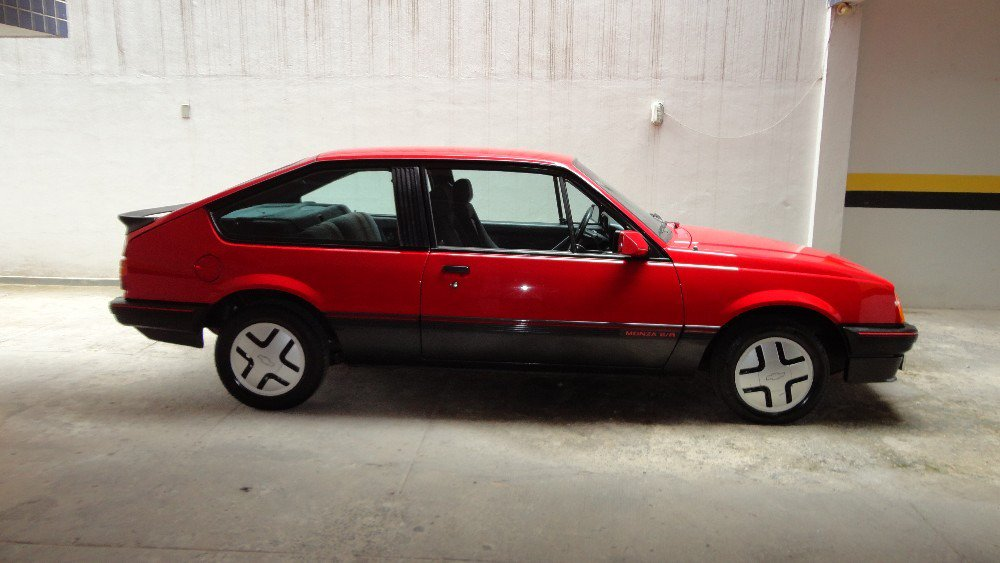
Chevrolet Monza S/R

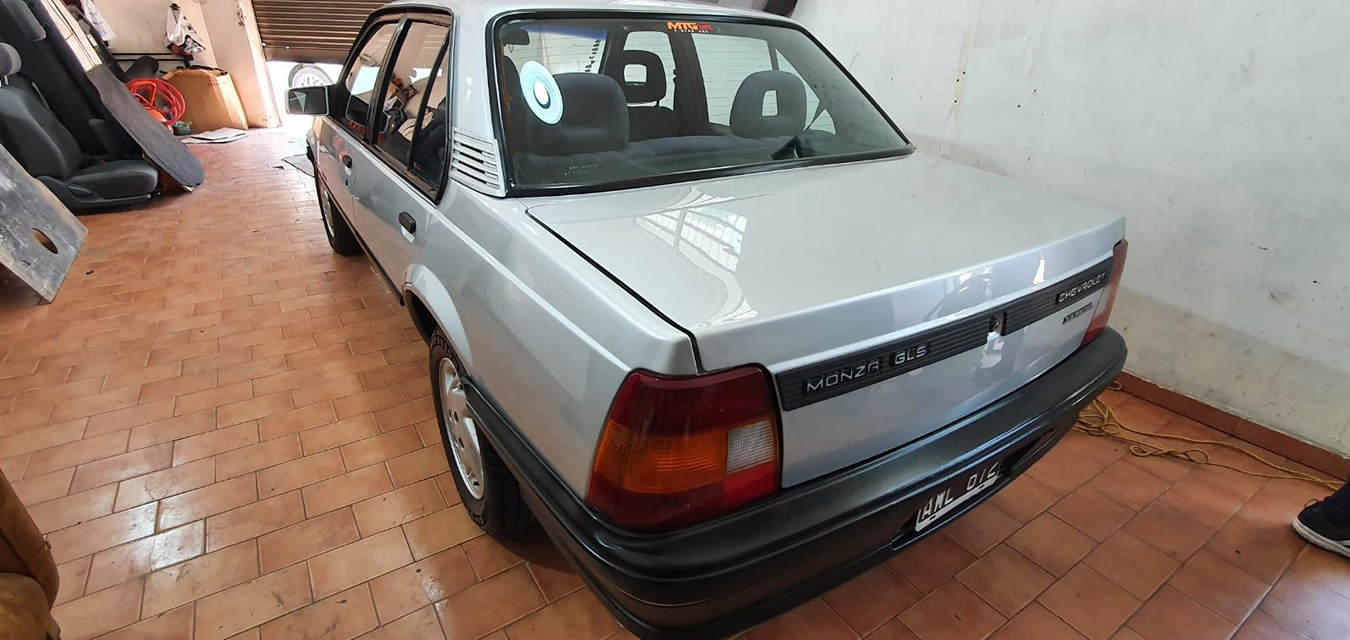
1996 Chevrolet Monza four-door sedan (Argentina)

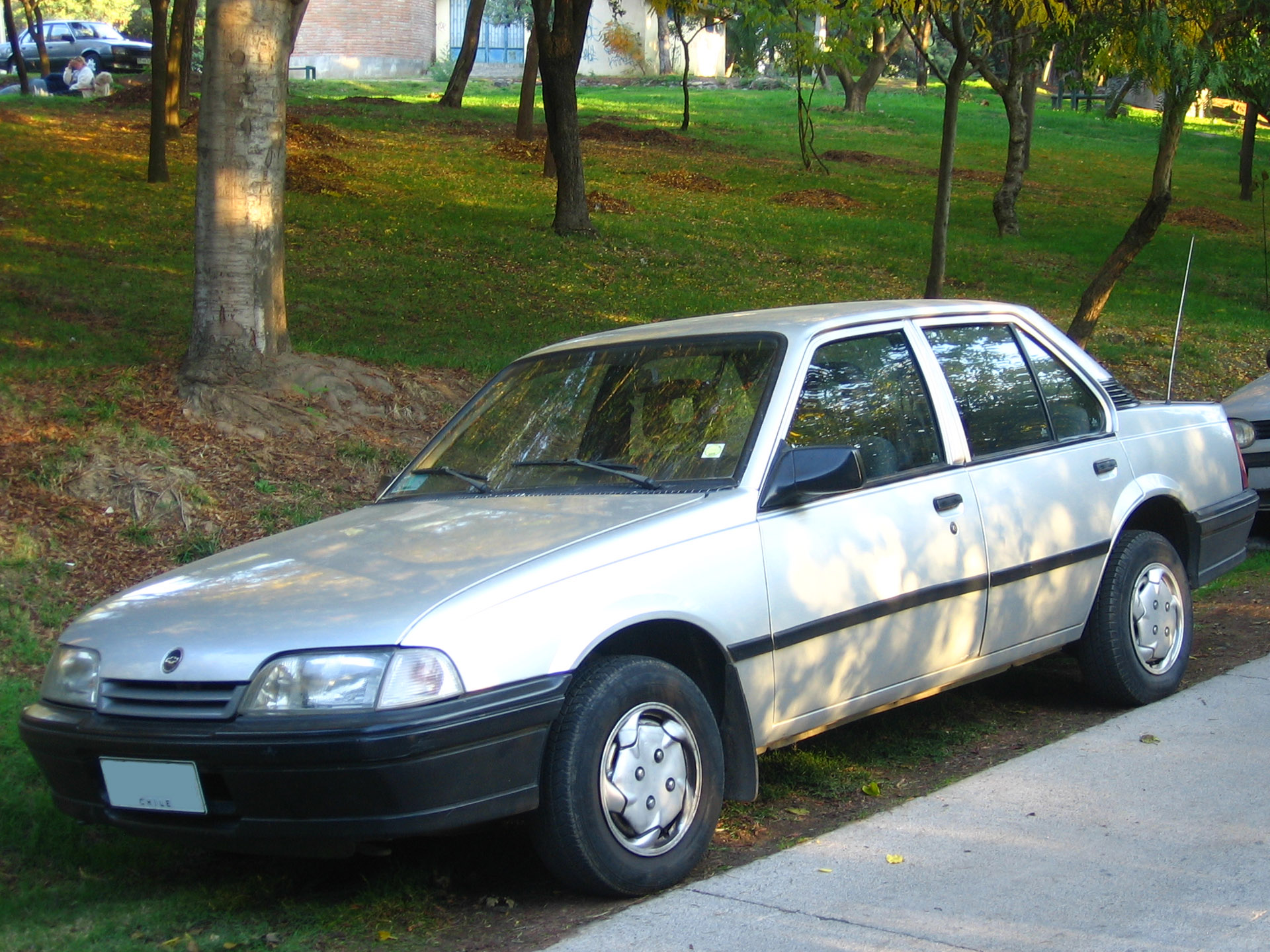
1996 Chevrolet Monza four-door sedan (Chile)

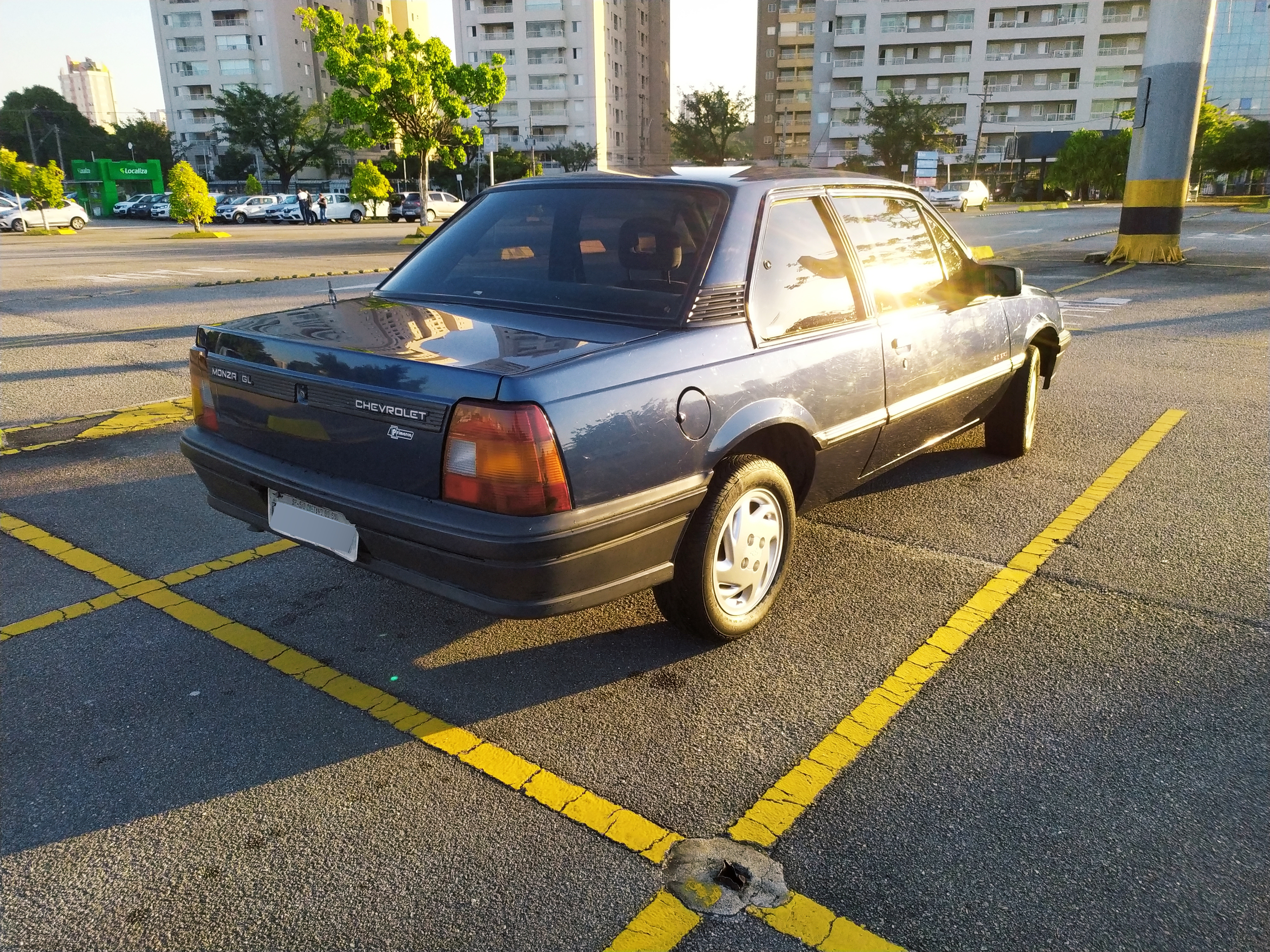
1995 Chevrolet Monza two-door sedan (Brazil)
