= Vacationer =

Vacationer usually refers to the noun derived from the term "vacation". It may also refer to the following:

== Automobiles ==
The "Vacationer" name has been applied to several special edition variants of Holden automobiles:

- Holden Camira
  - JE Vacationer, introduced in late 1987
- Holden Commodore:
  - VC Vacationer, introduced in November 1980
  - VH Vacationer, introduced in November 1981, October 1982, April 1983 and November 1983
  - VK Vacationer, introduced in September 1984 and October 1985
  - VL Vacationer, introduced in September 1987
  - VN Vacationer, introduced in October 1990
  - VP Vacationer, introduced in November 1992
  - VS Vacationer, introduced in September 1995
- Holden Kingswood:
  - HQ Vacationer, introduced in October 1973
  - HJ Vacationer II, introduced in November 1975
  - HZ Kingswood SL Vacationer, introduced in October 1978

== Other ==
- Vacationer (train), a passenger train operated by Amtrak
- Vacationer (band), an American band
