= Isuzu Aska =

Mid-size sedans

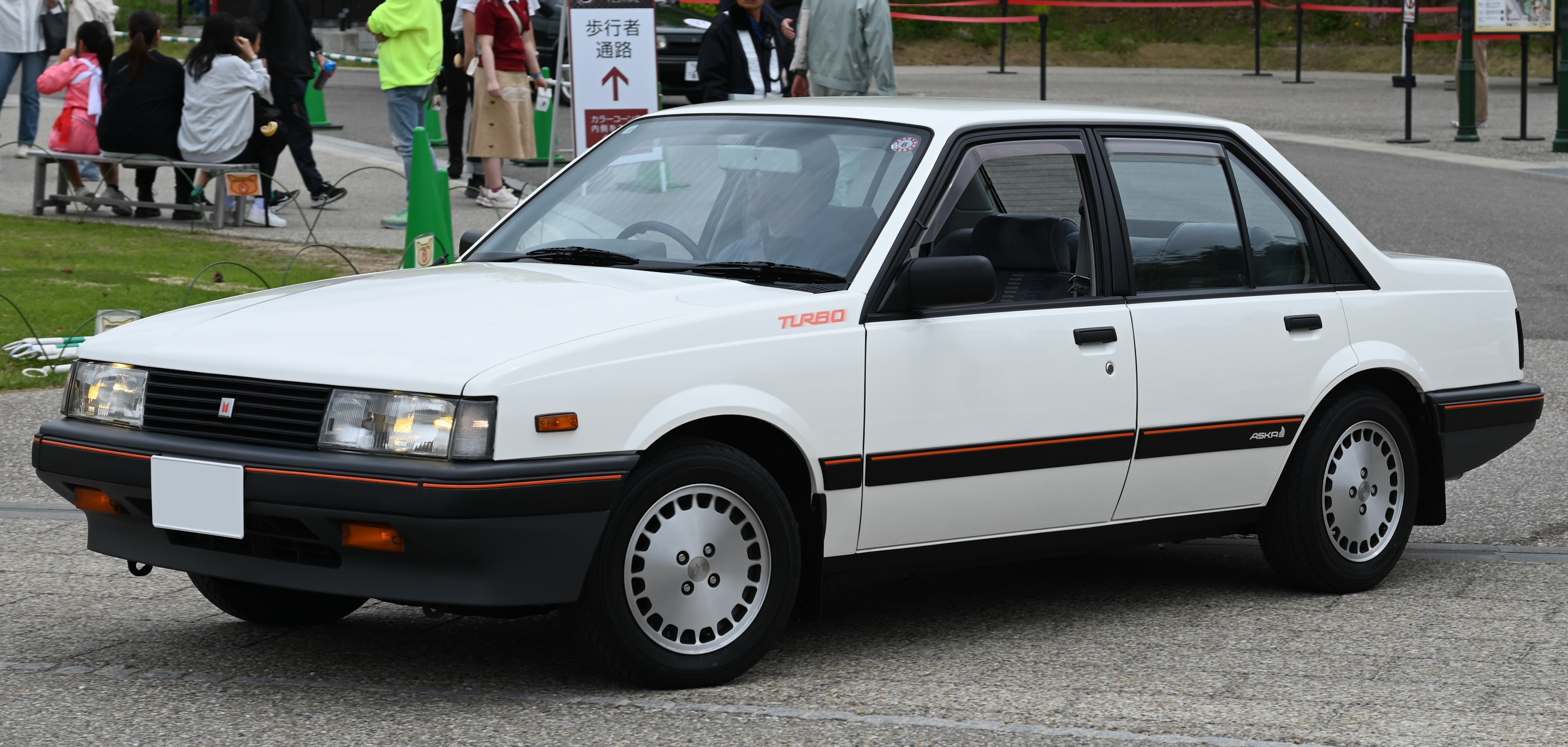

Overview
- Manufacturer: Isuzu
- Production: 1983–2002

Body and chassis
- Class: Family car
- Body style: 4-door sedan

Chronology
- Predecessor: Isuzu Florian

The Isuzu Aska was a nameplate used by Isuzu of Japan to denote its mid-size sedans from 1983 to 2002. Originally the Aska was a version of General Motors' J-car produced by Isuzu, but after Isuzu pulled out of manufacturing passenger cars the nameplate was applied to rebadged versions of the Subaru Legacy (1990 to 1993) and Honda Accord (1994 to 2002) sold through Isuzu's Japanese distribution network.

The Aska replaced the Isuzu Florian in Isuzu's lineup and was discontinued in 2002 without a replacement.

The name comes from the Japanese word, "Asuka", which is the old name of the Asuka Village in the Nara Prefecture of Japan. Because the name "Asuka" is likely to be mispronounced in foreign countries, the "u" was taken away from the name, presenting the model as the "Aska".

== First generation (1983–1989) ==
First generation
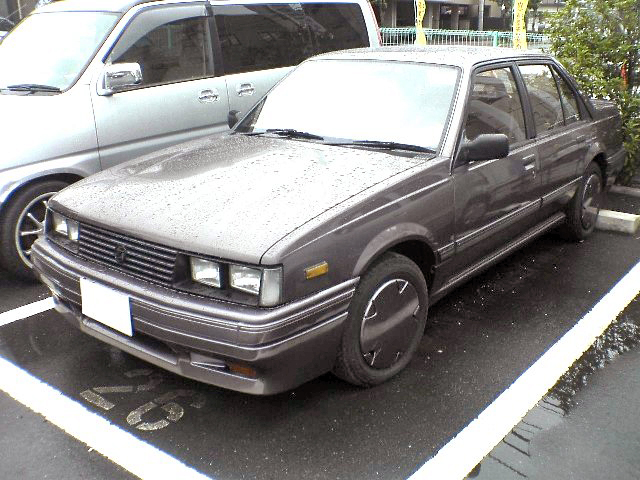

Overview
- Also called: Isuzu Florian Aska; Isuzu Uhuru (Kenya); Chevrolet JJ; Chevrolet Aska; Holden Aska (Indonesia); Holden Camira (JJ) (New Zealand)
- Production: 1983–1989
- Assembly: Japan: Kawasaki, Kanagawa (Kawasaki Plant); Chile: Arica (GM Chile); Ecuador: Quito (AYMESA)

Body and chassis
- Layout: Transverse front-engine, front-wheel drive
- Platform: GM J platform
- Related: Holden Camira; Opel Ascona C

Powertrain
- Engine: petrol: 1,817 cc 4ZB1 I4 (JJ110); 1,995 cc 4ZC1 I4 (JJ120); 1,995 cc 4ZC1-T turbo I4 (JJ120); diesel: 1,995 cc 4FC1 I4 (JJ510); 1,995 cc 4FC1-T turbo I4 (JJ510)
- Transmission: 4/5-speed manual; 3-speed automatic; 5-speed semi-automatic (NAVi5)

The original Aska was developed as a part of GM's J-car program and was a replacement for Isuzu's dated Florian. In contrast to fellow J-cars from other GM divisions, the Aska only came in one body style, a four-door sedan (the station wagon body style on the Florian was always relatively unpopular). The Isuzu J-car variant differed most notably in the rear styling from other J-car variants. From 1983 to 1984, the Aska was known as the "Florian Aska", before being renamed simply "Aska" in 1985.

The car was launched in March 1983 with carburetted 1.8 and 2.0 litre gasoline engines and a diesel, going on sale a month later. In August 1983 the Turbodiesel followed, with 89 PS (65 kW). In October 1983, a turbocharged and fuel injected version of the 2.0 litre engine, which developed 150 PS, joined the lineup as the LJ Turbo. In November 1985 a version branded by the German tuner Irmscher (specializing in Opels, they cooperated with Isuzu on some other models as well), this version featured a distinctive body kit and became somewhat of a cult object among some car fans in Japan.

In September 1984 the innovative (but ultimately unsuccessful) semi-automatic NAVi5 system became available for the naturally-aspirated Aska 2.0. This was an automated manual transmission with an electronically operated clutch, long before Alfa Romeo's Selespeed. In March 1985 the diesel also became available with the NAVi5 transmission, and from September 1986 the LG Turbodiesel was also available with it. The Aska underwent a very subtle facelift in July 1985, which was also when the "Florian" portion of the car's name was dropped.

The first generation Aska was discontinued in March 1989; production totaled 108,512 cars. Isuzu did not have a contender in this segment for about a year's time until the second generation Aska was presented.

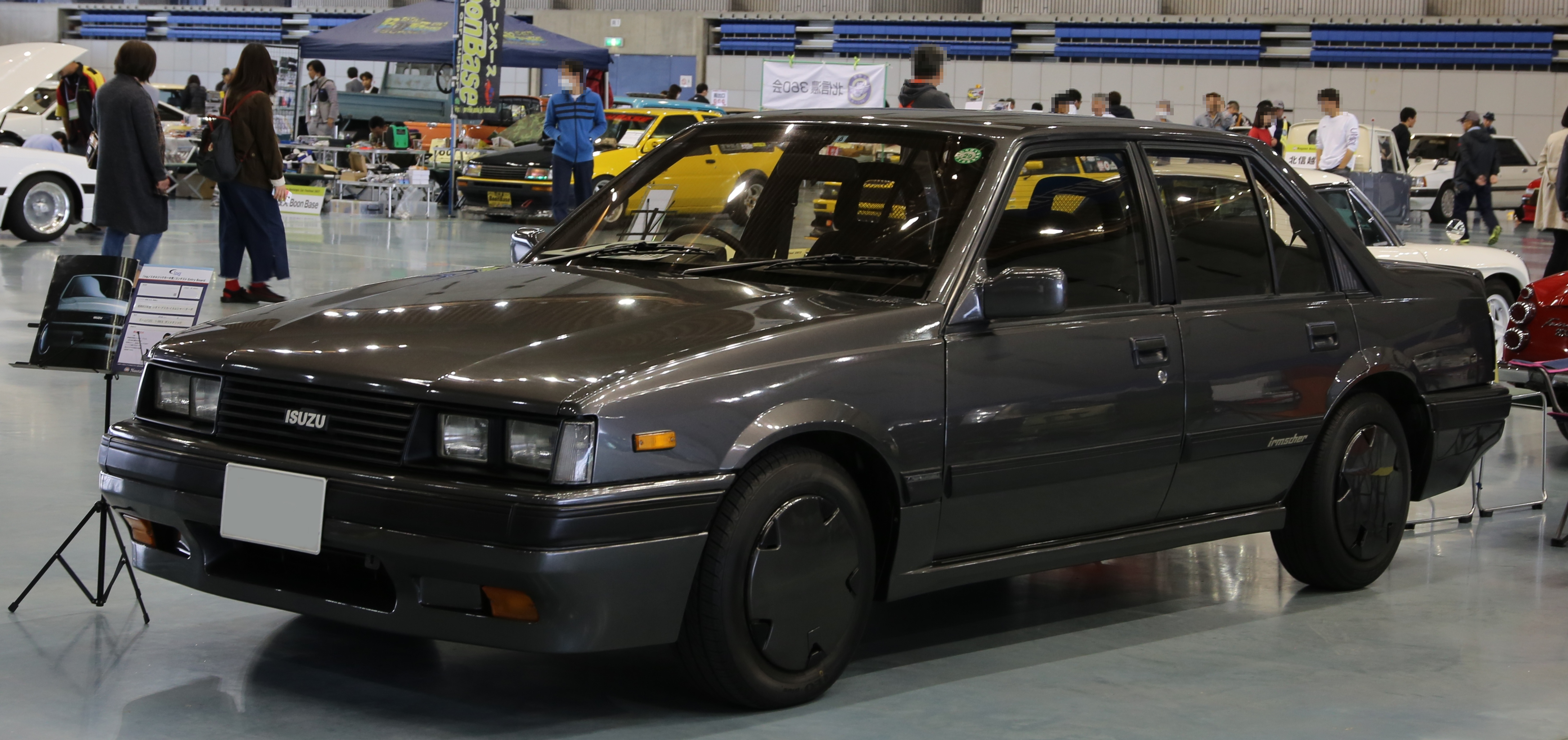
Isuzu Aska Irmscher Turbo (JJ120)

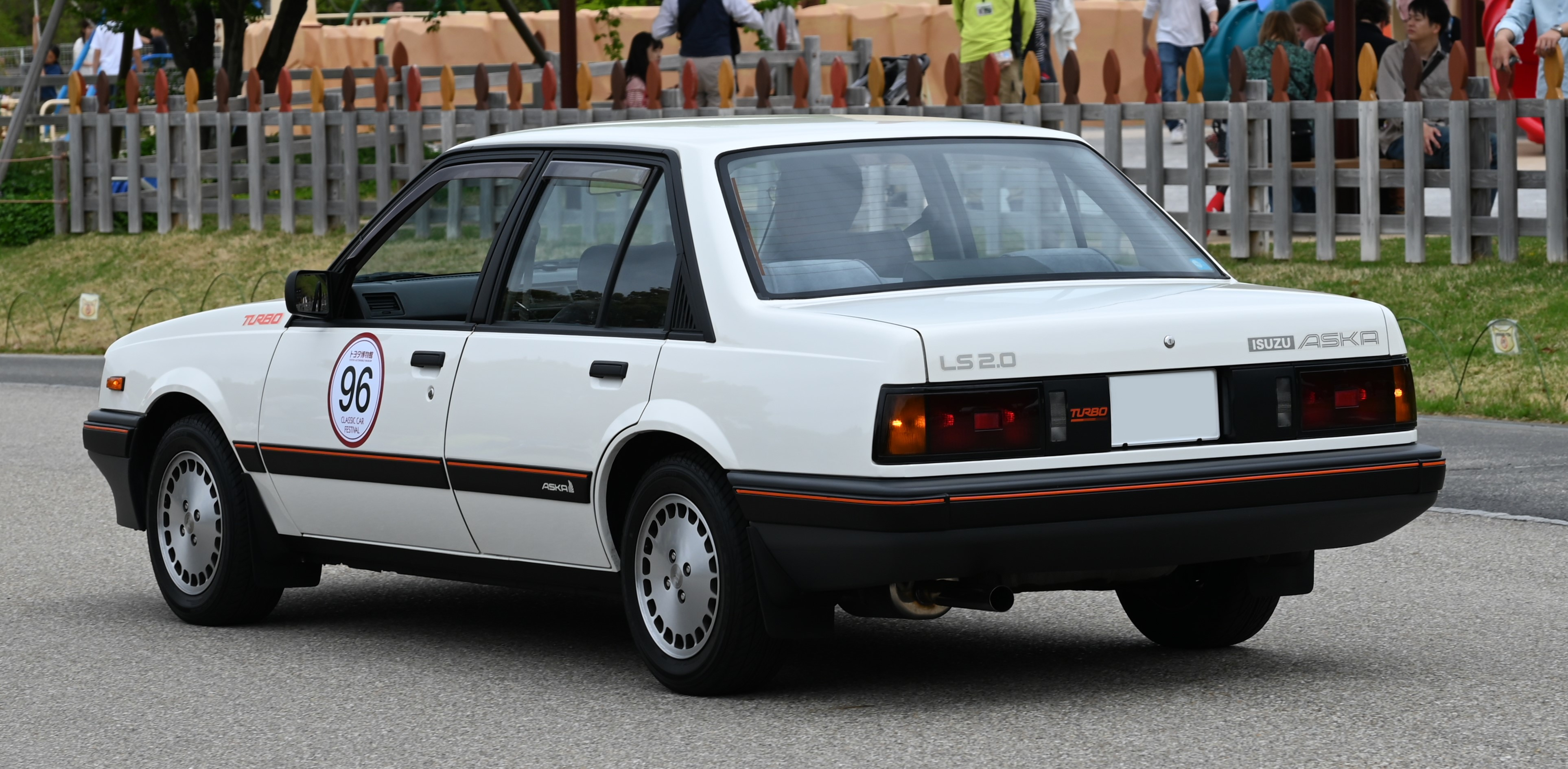
Rear View

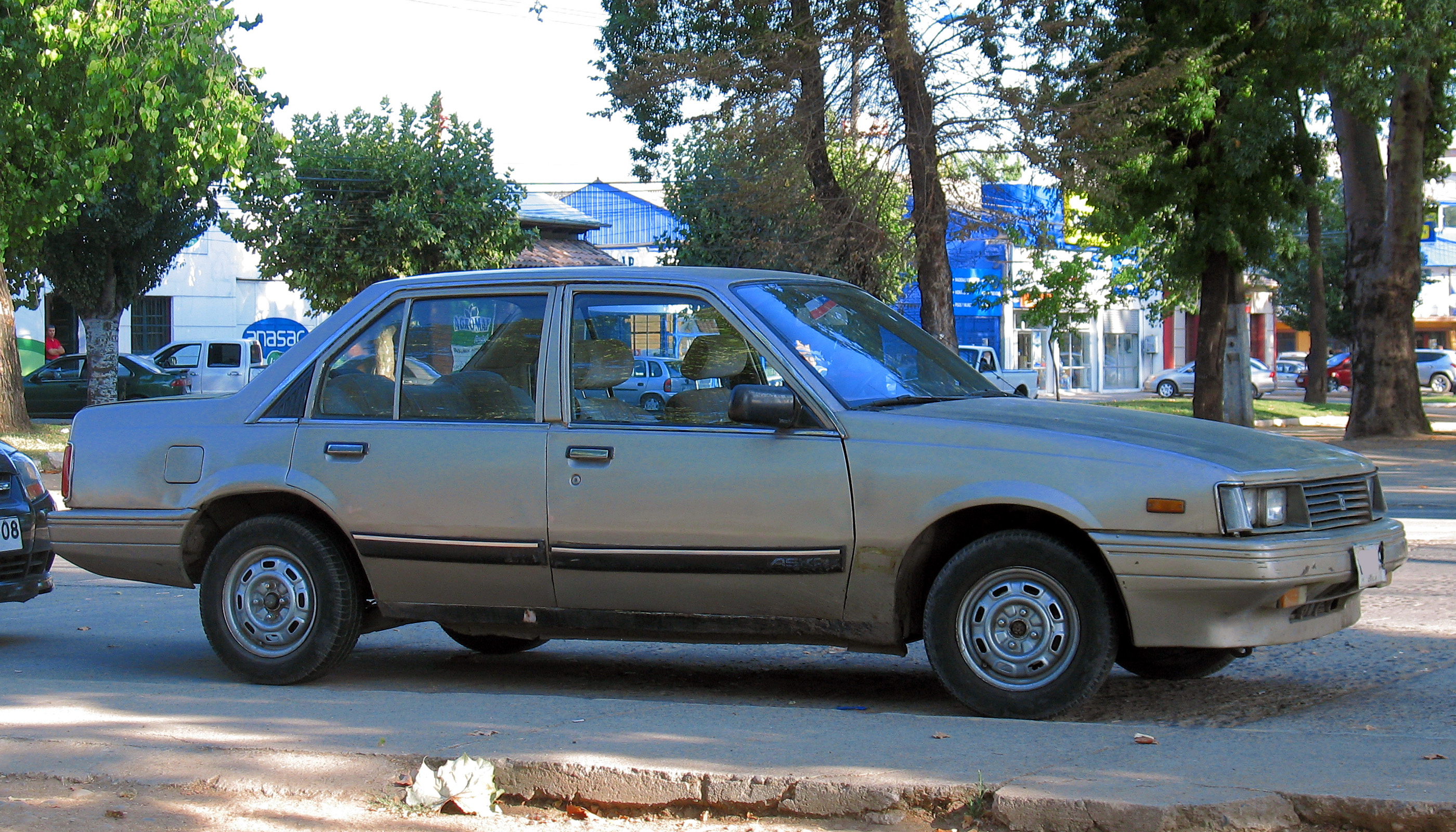
1985 Chevrolet Aska 1.8 Limited (Chile)

=== South America (Chile, Ecuador) ===
From 1984, the Aska was assembled in Arica, Chile from CKD kits and sold as Chevrolet Aska in the Chilean domestic market and in Ecuador. Chilean Askas came in three equipment levels (LT, Limited, and Deluxe), with two engines and either automatic or five-speed manual transmissions. While the two lesser versions both received a 91 PS (67 kW) 1.8-litre coupled to the five-speed, the Deluxe got the larger 2-litre with 100 PS (74 kW), only fitted with the automatic transmission.

=== South-East Asia and New Zealand ===
The Aska was exported to Southeast Asia, where it was known as the Isuzu JJ. It was also exported to New Zealand as the Holden Camira (JJ) between 1984 and 1987. This replaced the Australian-sourced JD Camira, because its predecessor, the JB Camira, had fared badly in the New Zealand market. However, the JD series wagon was retained, albeit imported concurrently from Australia rather than locally assembled. General Motors New Zealand switched back to the updated Australian version (JE) in 1987 due to the strengthening of Japanese Yen. In Indonesia, the two-liter version with 74 kW (101 PS) was briefly sold as the "Holden Aska" alongside the 1.6-liter Camira.

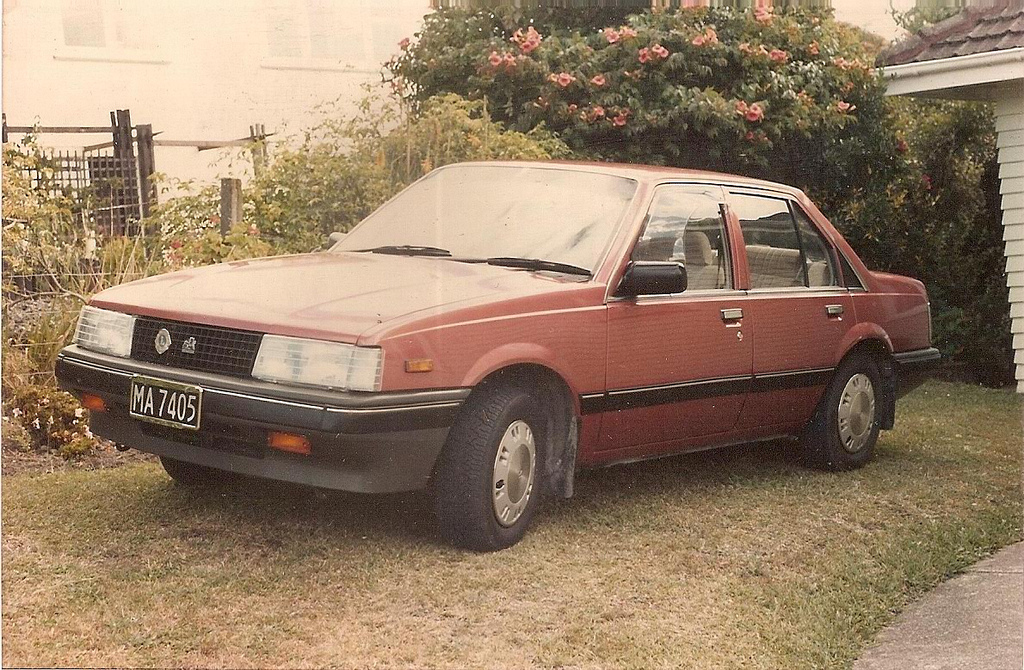

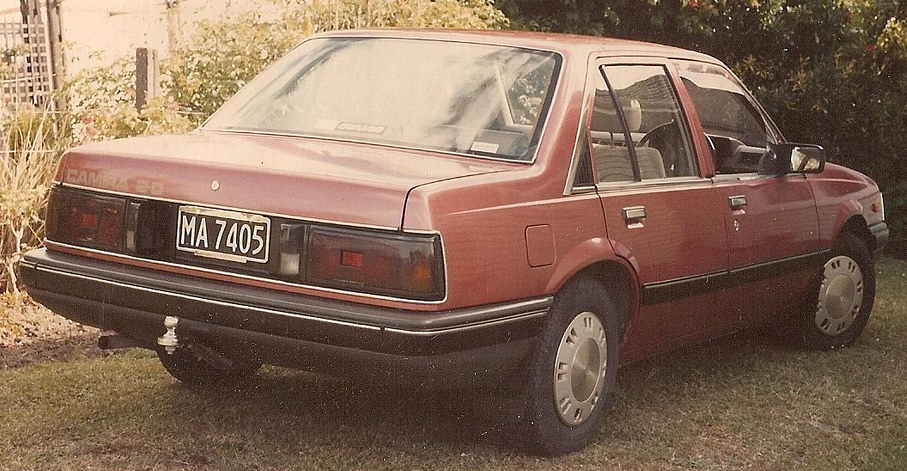
1984–1987 Holden Camira (JJ), New Zealand

== Second generation (1990–1993) ==
Second generation
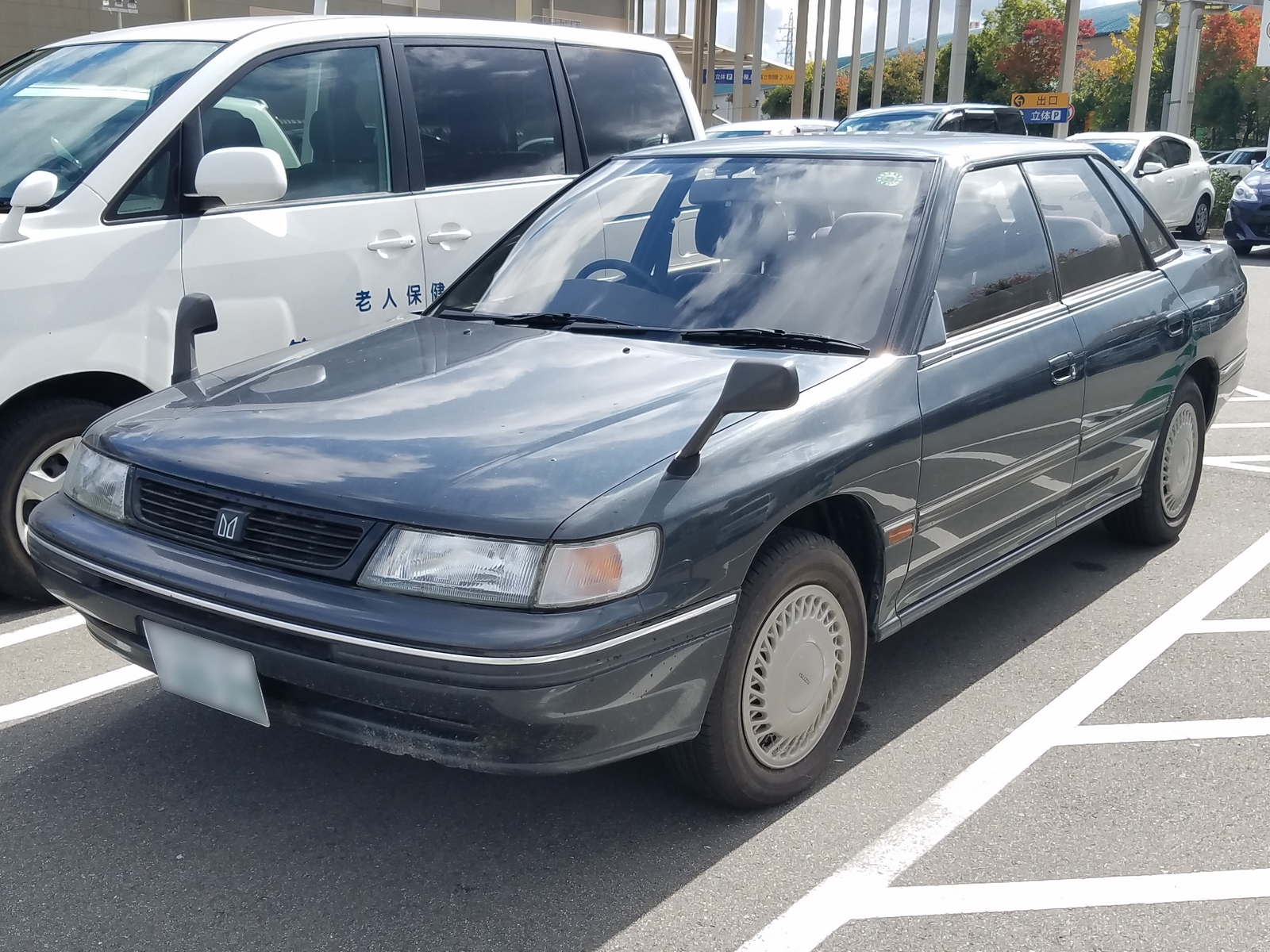

Overview
- Also called: Subaru Legacy; Isuzu Aska CX; Isuzu Aska E/T/V
- Production: 1990–1993
- Assembly: Japan: Ōta, Gunma (Subaru)

Body and chassis
- Layout: FF (standard); AWD (optional on 2.0L)

Powertrain
- Engine: 1.8 L EJ18 H4; 2.0 L EJ20 H4
- Transmission: 5-speed manual 4-speed automatic

With the exception of the American market, the J platform did not continue into the 1990s. Not having the resources to develop a mid-size car on their own, Isuzu forged a short-lived alliance with Subaru. This provided for Isuzu to supply Subaru with Isuzu Bighorns (rebadged as the Subaru Bighorn), while Isuzu rebadged Subaru's mid-size Legacy sedan as the Isuzu Aska, beginning in June 1990. Both rebadged models were sold only in the Japanese market. There was also a Subaru Leone Van version briefly available, badged as the Isuzu Geminett II.

The EJ series engine was offered in both 1.8 and 2.0 liter displacements. The engine has either single or double overhead camshaft architecture and pent-roof, cross flow cylinder firing chambers.

The 2.0 liter fuel delivery was managed with sequential multiport fuel injection, and the 1.8 liter engine used a modified fuel delivery system with single point throttle body fuel injection called SPFI. The DOHC 2.0 liter non turbocharged engine had a dual stage intake manifold.

The 2.0 liter vehicle came optional with Subaru's AWD system while the 1.8 came with FWD only. As with all other Askas, this was only ever available with four-door saloon bodywork. The Aska was discontinued in May 1993, as the Subaru deal came to an end.

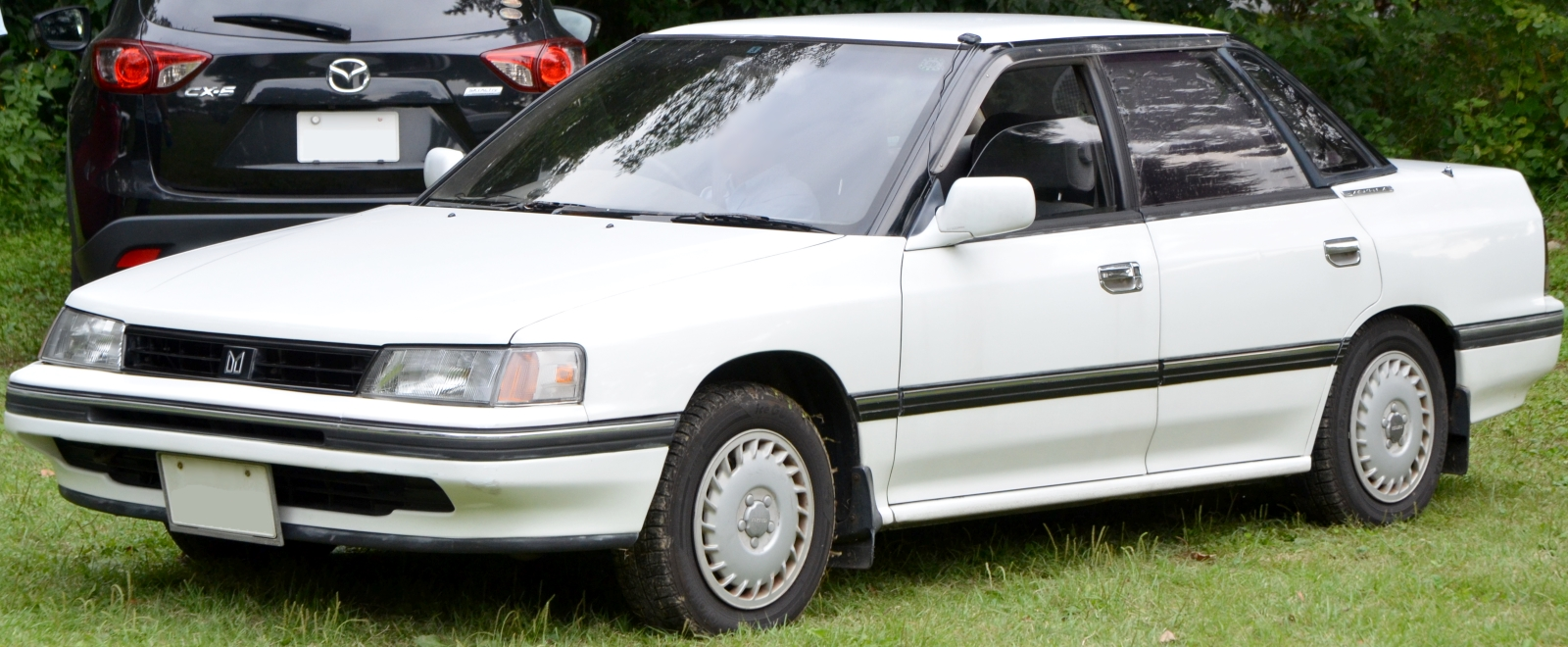
Isuzu Aska 2.0 CX (BCL; pre-facelift)

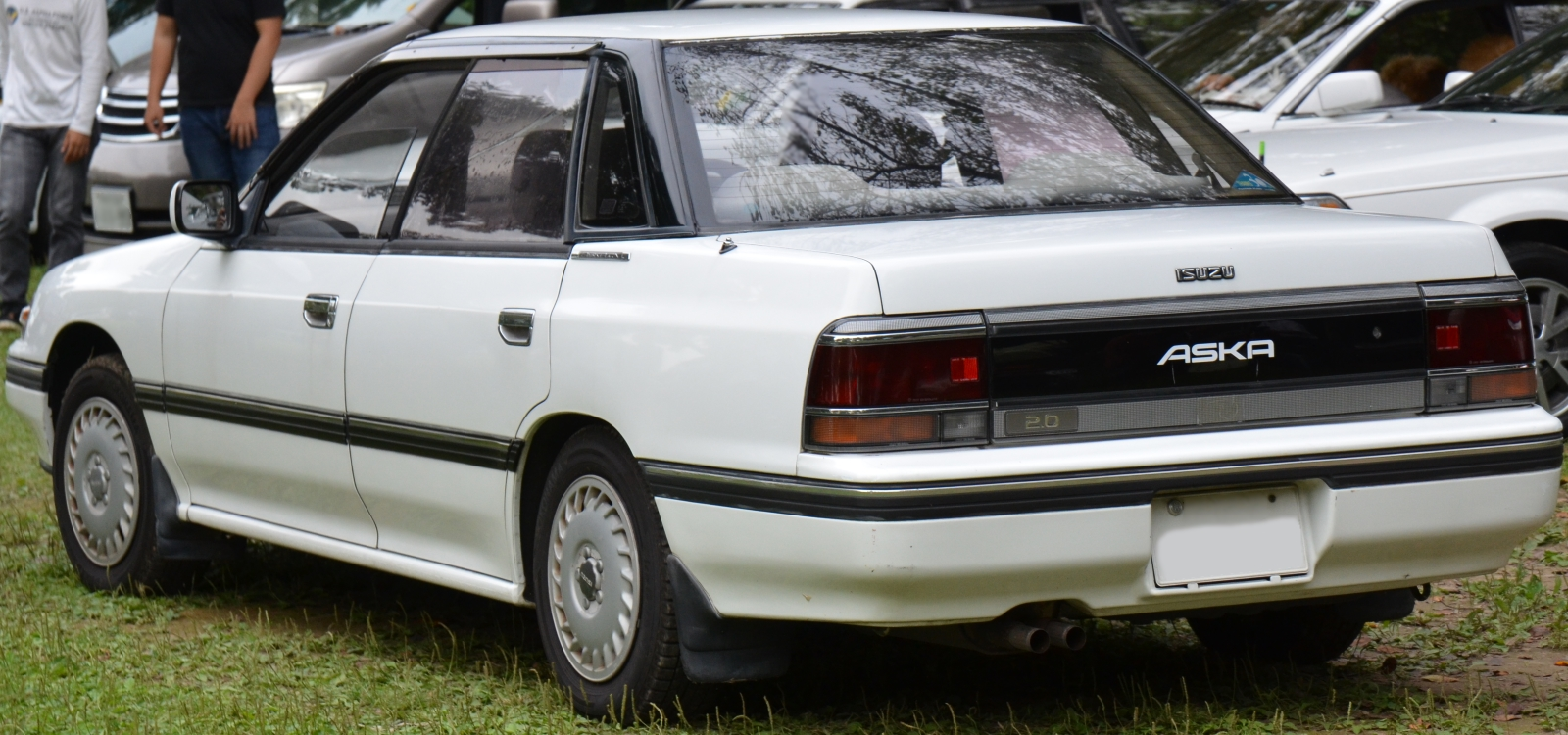
Pre-facelift; rear

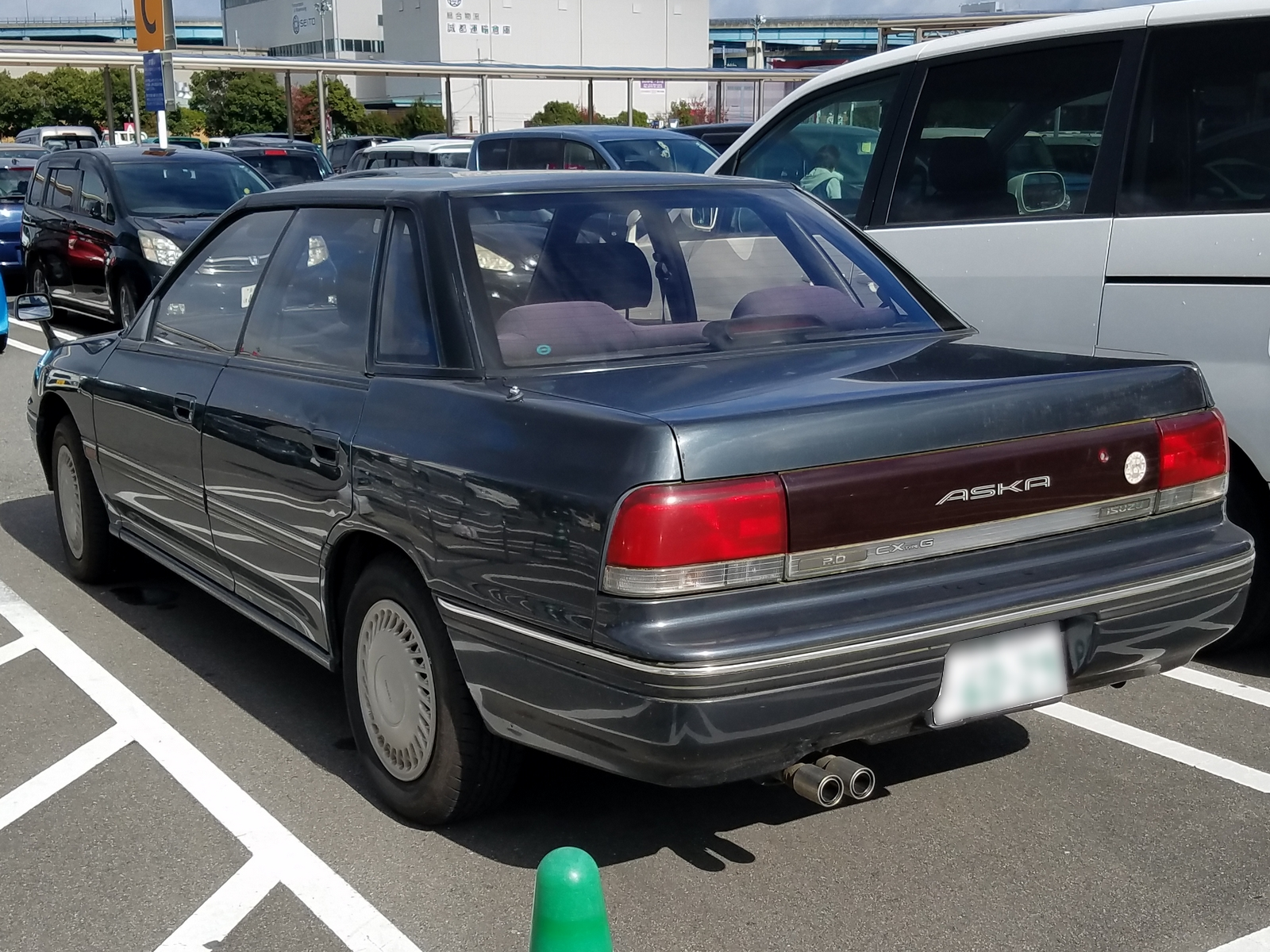
Isuzu Aska 2.0 CX type-G (facelift; rear)

== Third generation (1994–1997) ==
Third generation
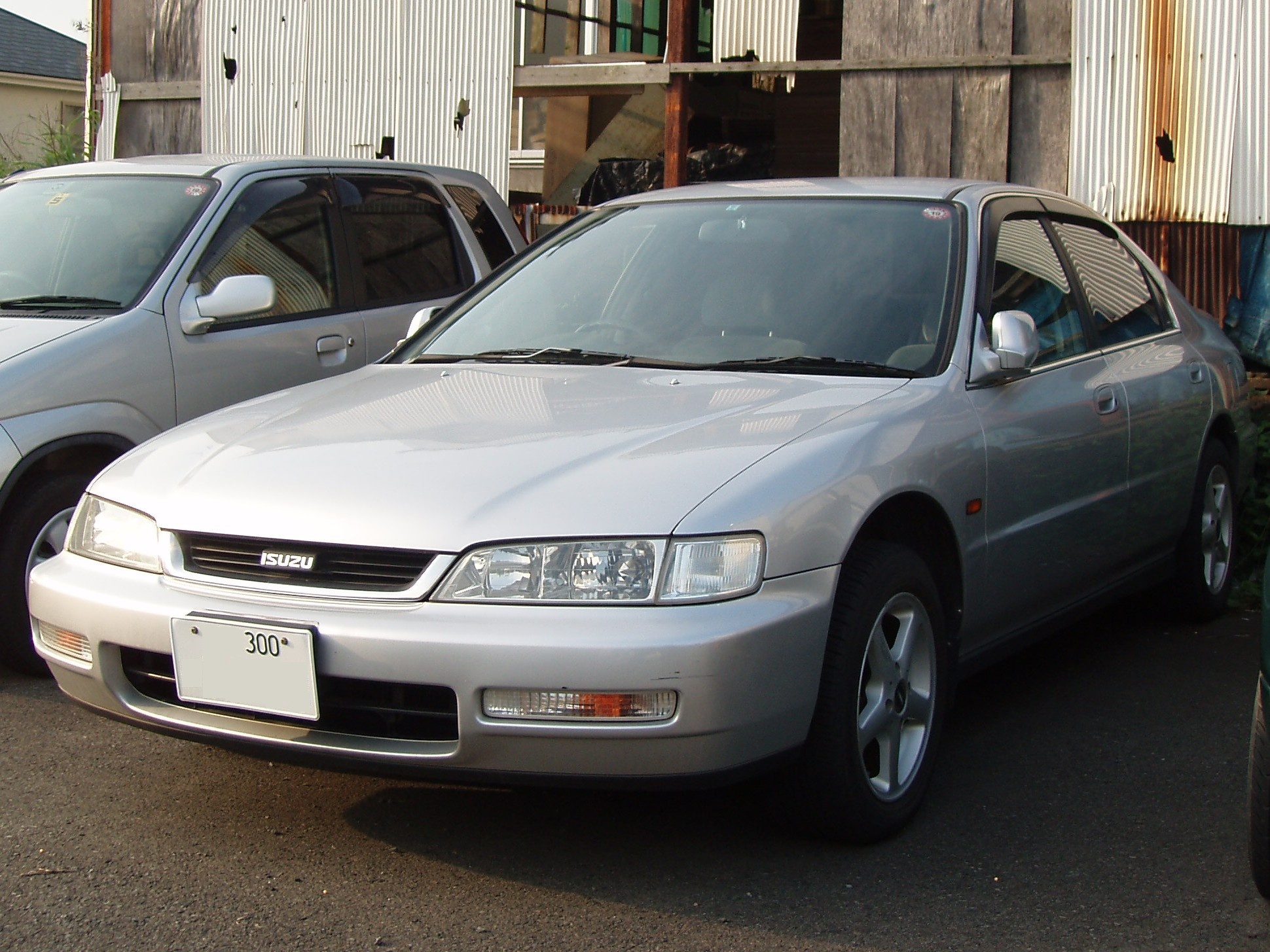

Overview
- Also called: Honda Accord
- Production: 1994–1997
- Assembly: Japan: Sayama (Honda Sayama Automobile Plant)

Body and chassis
- Body style: 4-door sedan
- Layout: FF

Powertrain
- Engine: 2.0 L F20B1 I4
- Transmission: 5-speed manual 4-speed automatic

Dimensions
- Length: 4,675 mm (184.1 in)
- Width: 1,760 mm (69.3 in)
- Height: 1,410 mm (55.5 in)

Later, Isuzu entered a more substantial model-exchange alliance with Honda. Among other models, it encompassed the rebadging of the Honda Accord sedan as the Isuzu Aska. This model was presented in March 1994, after stock of the Legacy-based, previous generation Aska had been sold out. The only difference to the Accord was the grille and logos.

It was only offered with a two-liter four-cylinder engine, combined with a four-speed automatic transmission. The model code assigned to it by Isuzu was CJ1. Production came to an end in September 1997, with sales from stock continuing for another two months.

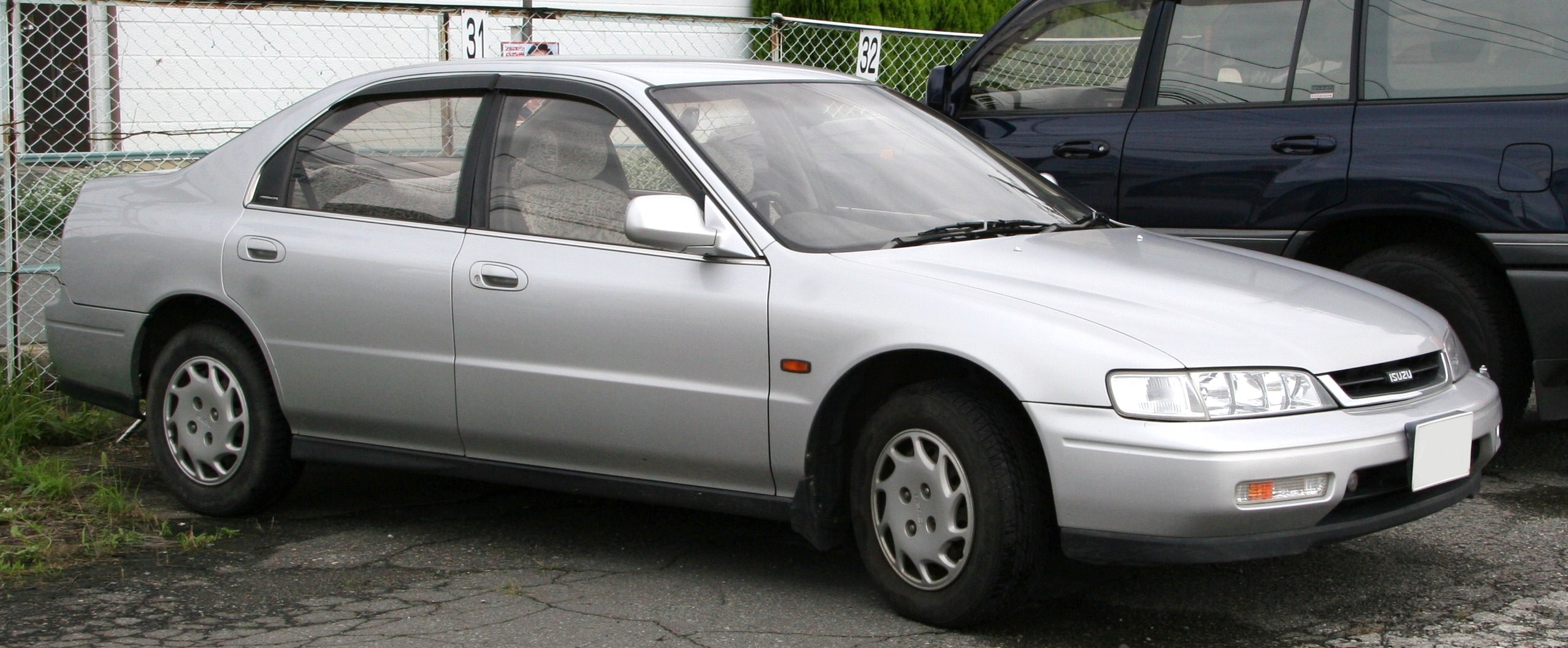
Isuzu Aska (3rd Gen), front

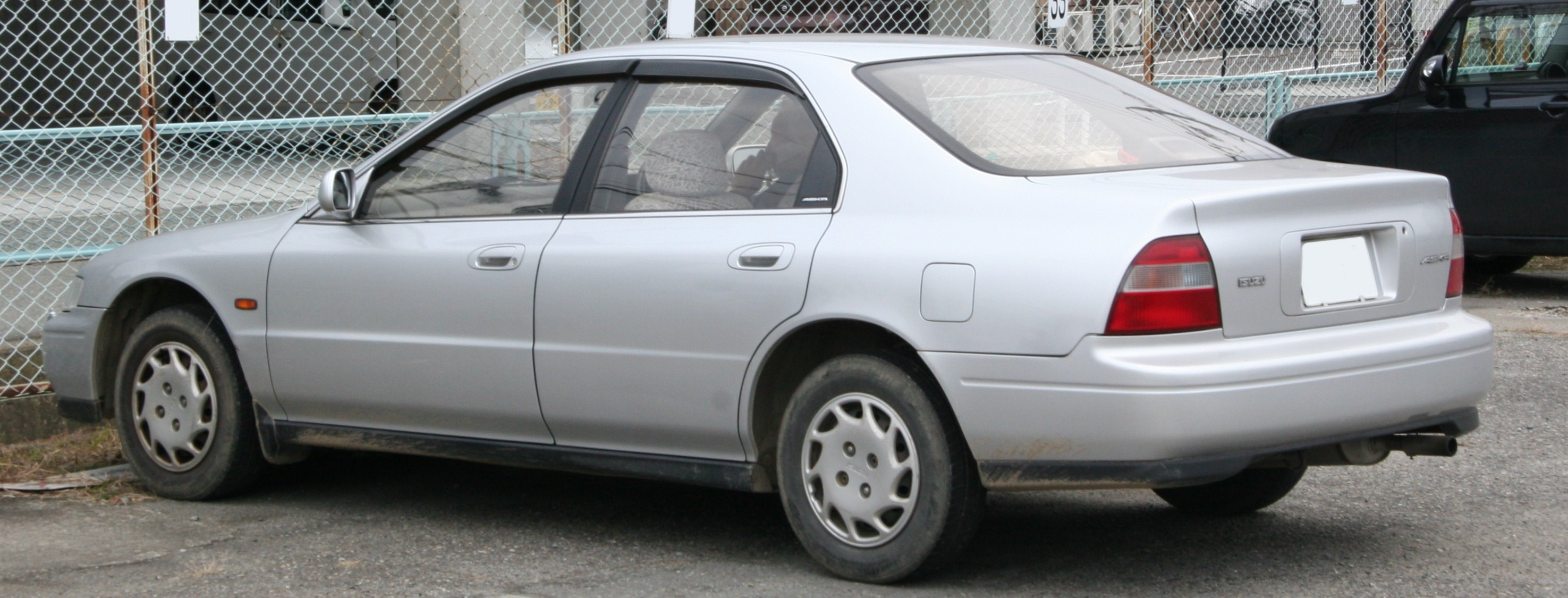
Isuzu Aska (3rd Gen), rear

== Fourth generation (1998–2002) ==
Fourth generation
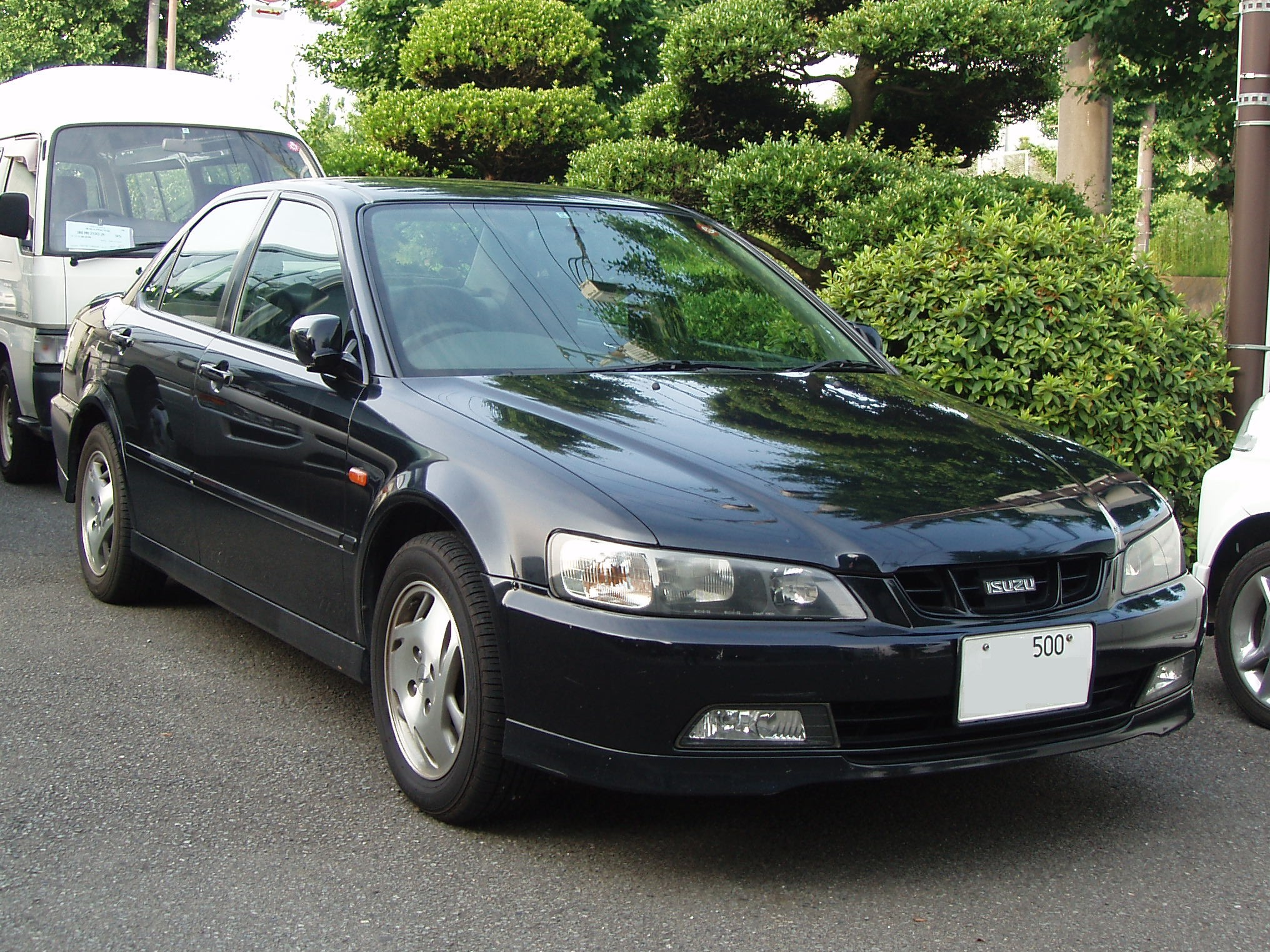

Overview
- Also called: Honda Accord; Honda Torneo
- Production: 1998–2002
- Assembly: Japan: Sayama (Honda Sayama Plant)

Body and chassis
- Body style: 4-door sedan
- Layout: FF

Powertrain
- Engine: 1.8 L F18B I4; 2.0 L F20B1 I4
- Transmission: 5-speed manual 4-speed automatic

Dimensions
- Length: 4,635 mm (182.5 in)
- Width: 1,695 mm (66.7 in)
- Height: 1,420 mm (55.9 in)

Introduced in November 1997, this was the second generation of Accord-based Askas - thus the third generation Aska was the fifth generation Accord and the fourth was the sixth generation Accord sedan. The Aska remained a Japanese-only model and was discontinued in 2002. Model codes were CJ2 for the 1.8 and CJ3 for the 2.0. The engines produce 140 and 150 PS (103 and 110 kW) respectively and both were available with either a five-speed manual or a four-speed automatic transmission. The differences between this and the Accord were limited to the grille, logos, and wheels. One additional change was that the engine head cover had the Honda logo removed, with only "VTEC" remaining.

The fourth generation Aska received a light facelift in June 2000. This change included new bumpers, redesigned taillights, interior updates, and cleaner engines. Production ended in March 2002, with sales from stock continuing until September. This marked the end of Isuzu passenger car sales, 49 years after their first car was presented.

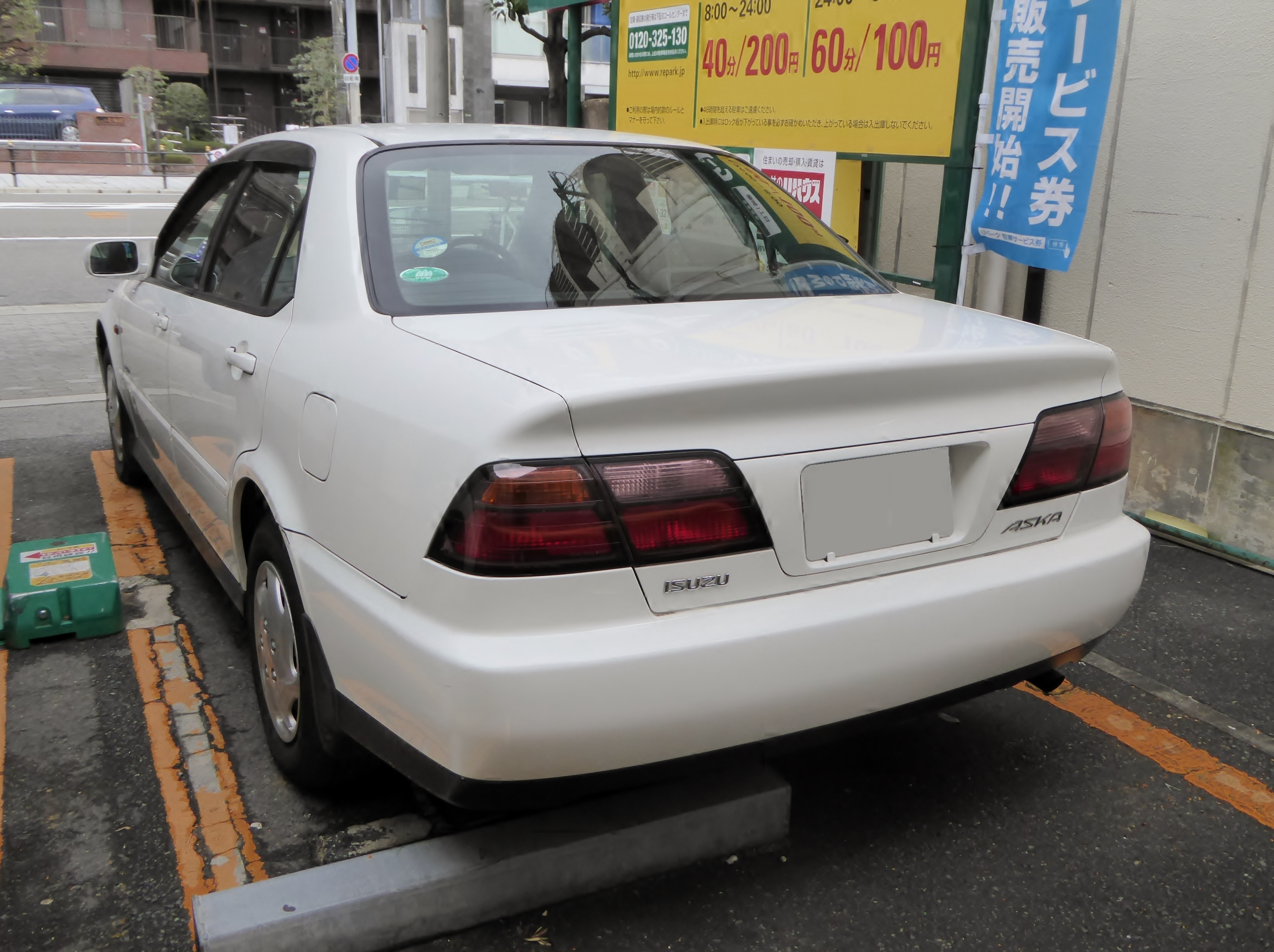
Isuzu Aska, 4th Gen.
(pre-facelift) (CJ2), rear

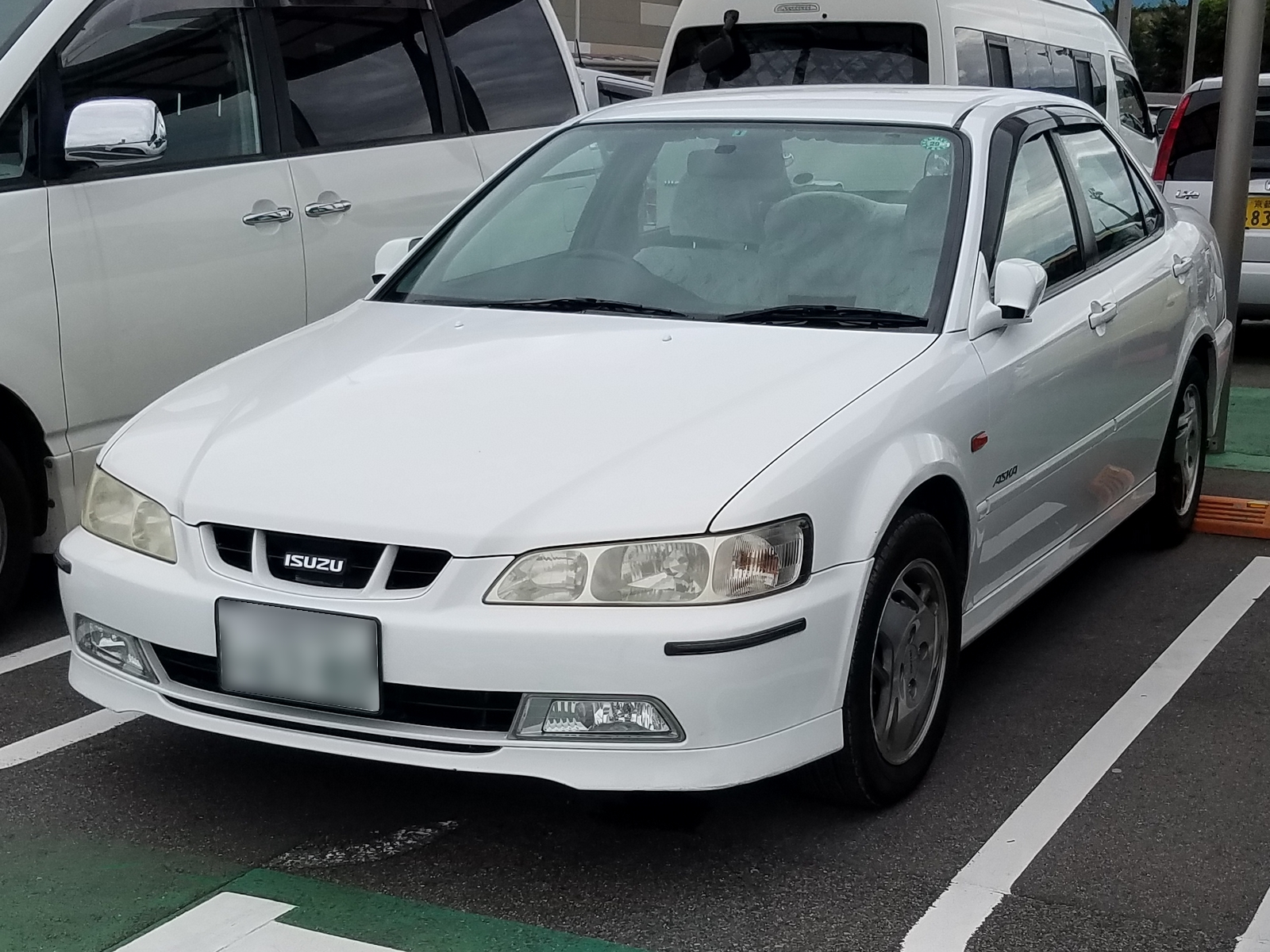
Isuzu Aska, 4th Gen.
(facelift) (CJ3), front

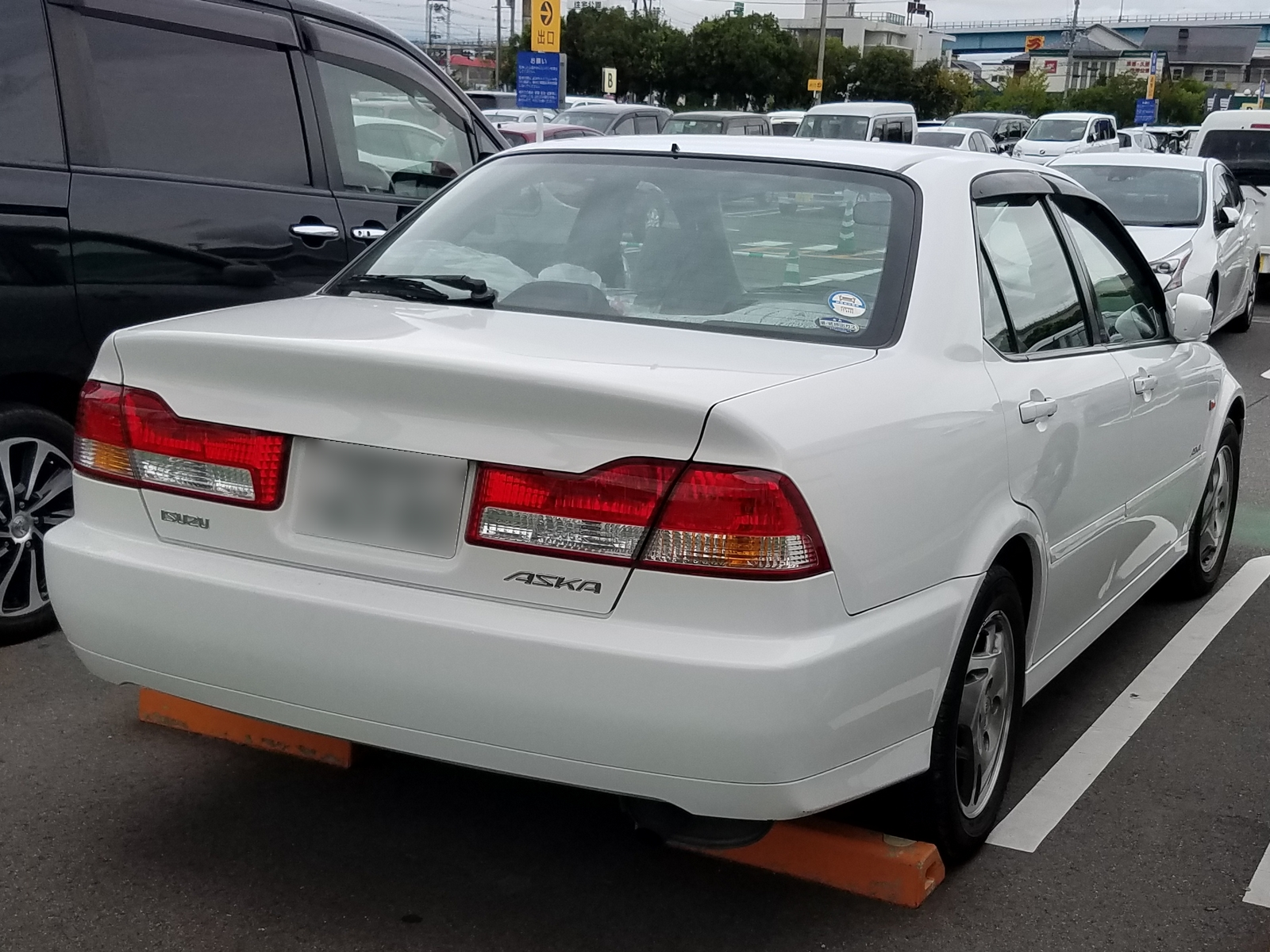
Isuzu Aska, 4th Gen.
(facelift) (CJ3), rear
