= Holden Camira =

Mid-size car from Holden

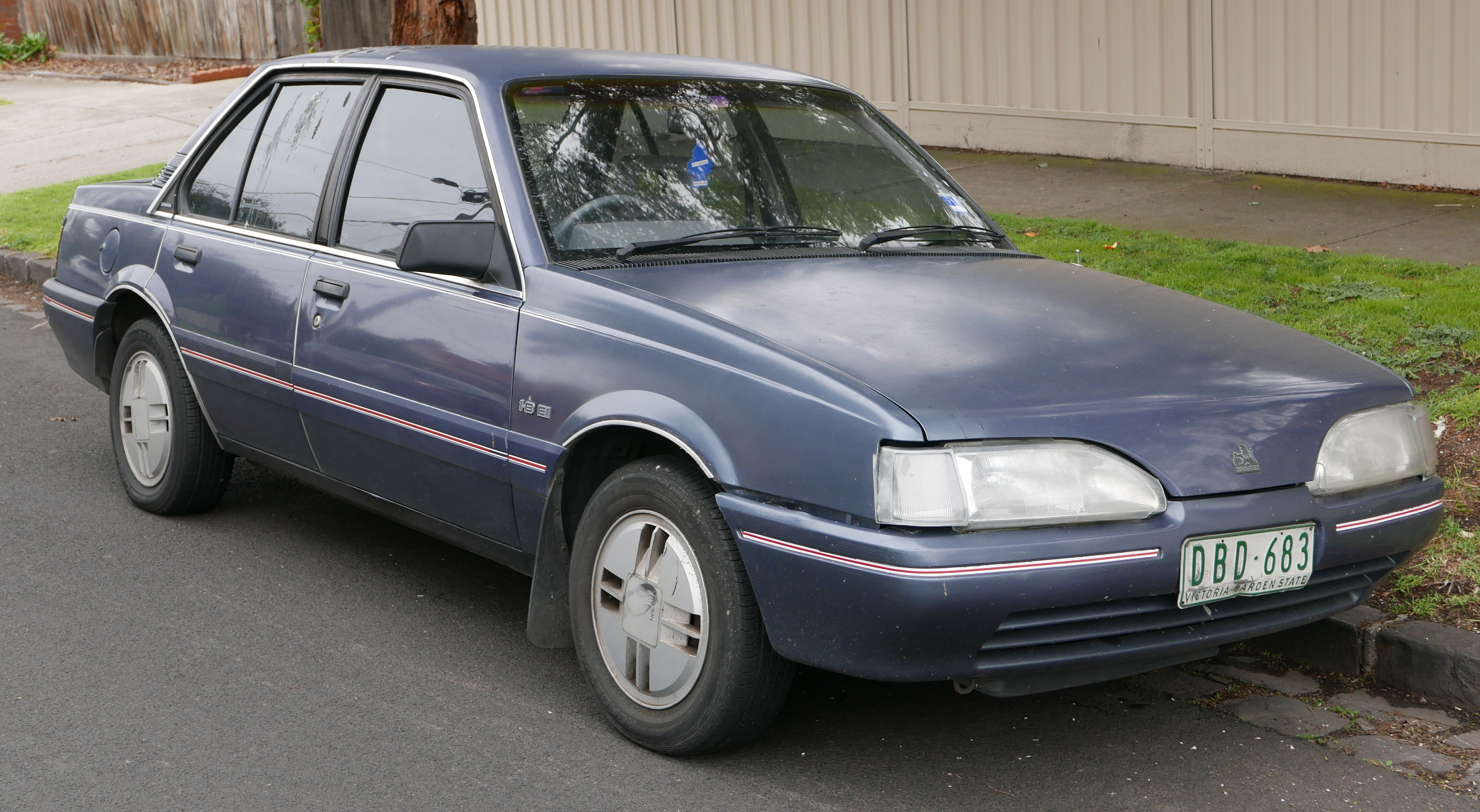
- Holden Camira (JD) SLE sedan

Overview
- Manufacturer: Holden
- Production: 1982–1989; 151,807 produced
- Assembly: Australia: Adelaide, South Australia (Elizabeth)

Body and chassis
- Class: Mid-size
- Body style: 4-door sedan 5-door station wagon
- Layout: Transverse front-engine, front-wheel drive
- Platform: GM J platform
- Related: Isuzu Aska; Opel Ascona C; Vauxhall Cavalier

Chronology
- Predecessor: Holden Sunbird/Torana
- Successor: Holden Apollo (Australia); Opel Vectra (New Zealand)

The Holden Camira is a mid-size car that was produced by Holden between 1982 and 1989. It was Holden's version of GM's J-body family of cars—GM's third "global" car platform, and was heavily based on the European J-body car – the Opel Ascona C. The name "Camira" comes from an Aboriginal word meaning "wind."

After a good initial sales run, Camira sales dropped significantly and the model was discontinued in 1989. The Holden Apollo, a rebadged Toyota Camry, was introduced as the Australian market replacement, with New Zealand instead offering the European-sourced Opel Vectra. In all 151,807 Camiras were built (85,725 JBs; 36,953 JDs; and 29,129 JEs).

== JB (1982–1984) ==
JB
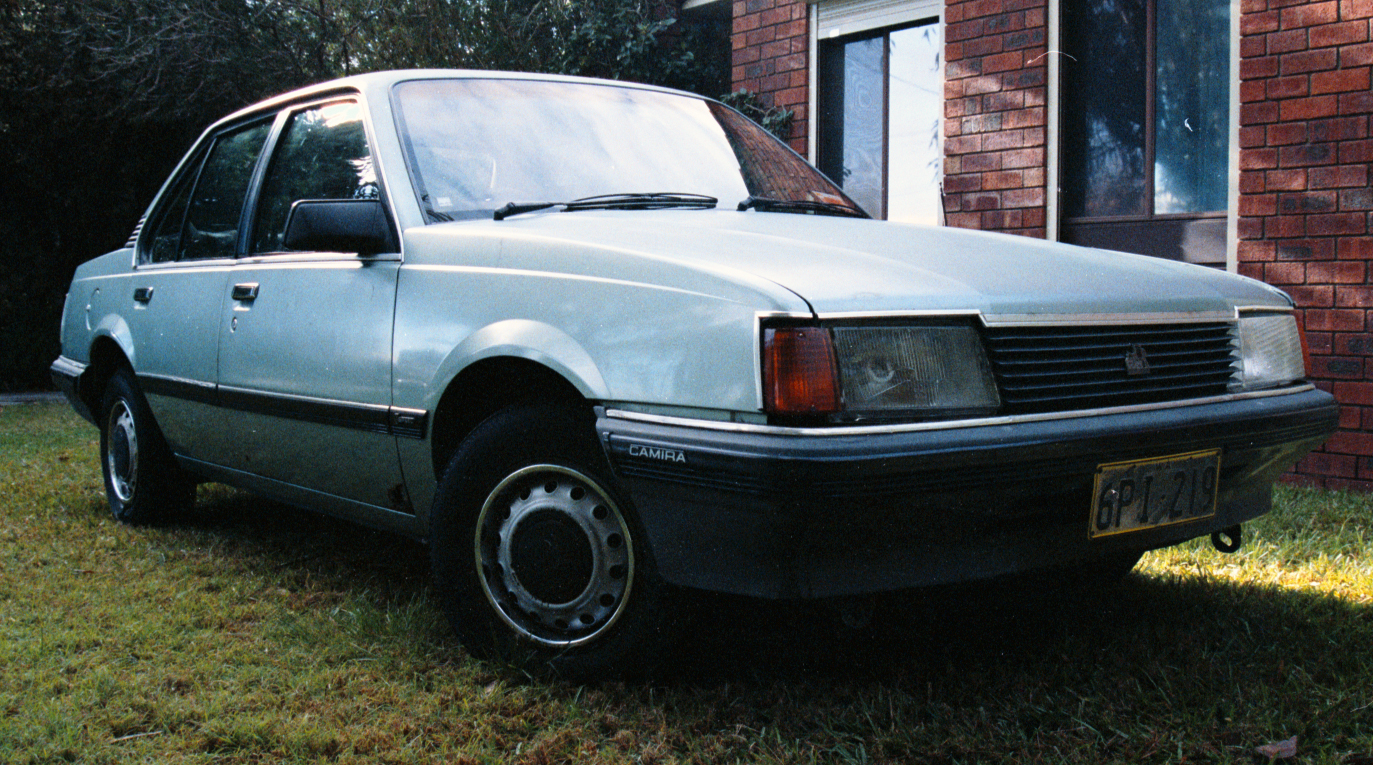

Overview
- Production: 1982–1984 (85,725 produced)

Powertrain
- Engine: 1.6 L Camtech (16LF) I4
- Transmission: 4-speed Muncie M17 manual 5-speed Getrag 282 manual 3-speed Turbo-Hydramatic 125 C automatic

Dimensions
- Wheelbase: 2,577 mm (101.5 in)
- Length: 4,399 mm (173.2 in)
- Width: 1,668 mm (65.7 in)
- Height: 1,369 mm (53.9 in)
- Curb weight: 1,040 kg (2,290 lb)

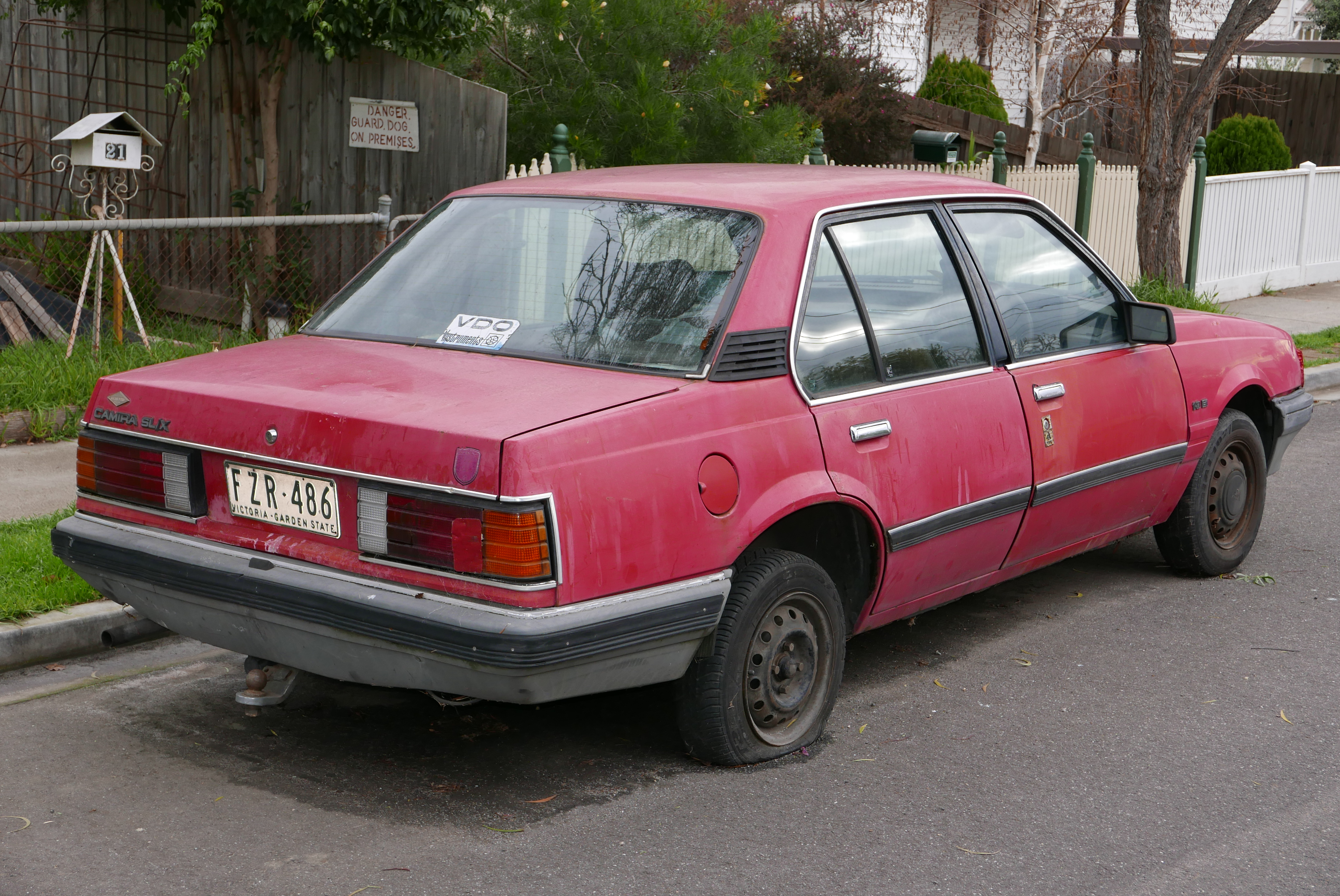
JB Camira SLX sedan (Australia)

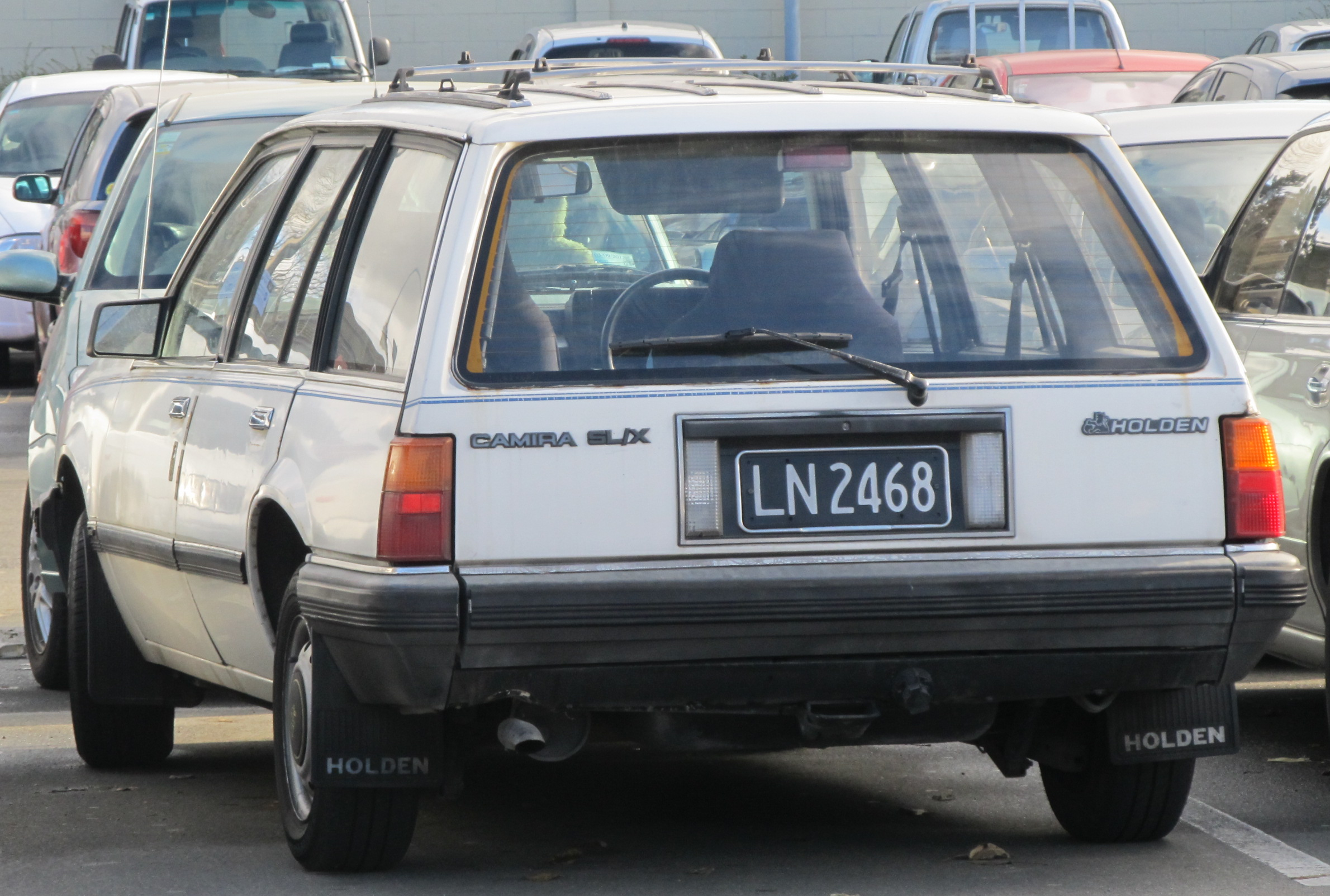
JB Camira SL/X wagon (New Zealand)

The original Camira, the JB series, was introduced in August 1982 with a major trans-Tasman marketing campaign. The Camira replaced the Sunbird and Torana, although an interim four-cylinder version of the Commodore bridged the two-year production gap.

A station wagon version was introduced in March 1983 and its bodywork was exported to Vauxhall in the United Kingdom for the Cavalier estate. Some Camiras were also exported to right-hand drive markets in Southeast Asia, such as Indonesia and Singapore. The wagon variant was specifically a Holden design (unrelated to that of the North American J-car wagons), which Holden insisted should be part of the overall "J-car" program. A five-door hatchback, based on the Opel Ascona/Vauxhall Cavalier "J-car" was proposed for the Camira, but never made it to the production stage due to Holden's financial losses at that time.

There was only one engine, the carbureted, naturally aspirated, transversely mounted 1.6-litre four-cylinder engine delivering 64 kilowatts (86 hp). The transaxle offering was a four-speed manual on the SL and SL/X, with a five-speed unit specified to SJ and SL/E variants. A three-speed automatic was optional on all models. Power steering was optional from early 1984.

The Camira was Wheels magazine's Car of the Year for 1982. While superior to most other cars of the day in terms of ride and handling, the 1.6-litre Family II (16LF) engine, marketed as Camtech, was regarded as "underpowered" by much of the motoring media. While partly true, the powerplant produced similar power levels to many of its rivals, although the actual power delivery differed. Unlike traditional Australian engines that had reserves of low down torque, the Camira required a very different driving style that involved revving the engine.

Early models of the Camira suffered from a litany of quality control problems, which included smoking engines, insufficient drainage holes in the doors, poor paint quality and lack of adequate fan cooling, resulting in overheating in JB Camiras fitted with air conditioning. This tarnished the Camira's reputation and led to its withdrawal from the New Zealand market, where a rebadged version of the Isuzu Aska, known as the JJ Camira, was sold instead.

There are several models within the JB range that are seen as "more desirable" and were produced in very limited numbers. These are the Formula and the SJ; both available in sedans only.

There were also some modified by the Country Dealer Team Performance Vehicle company based in Victoria. These JBs were available in three versions. All had full fibreglass body kits and mag wheels (S1). The S2 had a full range of options. The 1.6 engines were modified with extractors, a Weber carburetor and the S3 was fitted with a turbocharger. They also have very distinctive decals. CDT versions are seen as the rarest and most desirable.

=== Specification levels ===
- SL: entry-level variant, with no air conditioning or power steering, though it is possible to find some with dealer-fitted air conditioning.
- SJ : sporty version based on SL with a five-speed manual transmission. Other changes constrained to cosmetic upgrades. Available in three colours - Electron Blue, Super Maranello Red and Quasar Orange.
- SL/X: received several additional extras over SL including cloth trim, extra chrome, and other cosmetic upgrades.
- SL/E: top-of-the-line model with richer trim, full instrumentation, and alloy wheels as standard. These alloy wheels were styled similarly to those of the VH Commodore SL/E wheels (but using a four-spoke/four-stud design rather than the Commodore's five). Despite being available in all other "J-car" models, power windows were not available in the Australian Camira models until the JE version. However air conditioning and cruise control were optional, as was a trip computer.

== JD (1984–1987) ==
JD
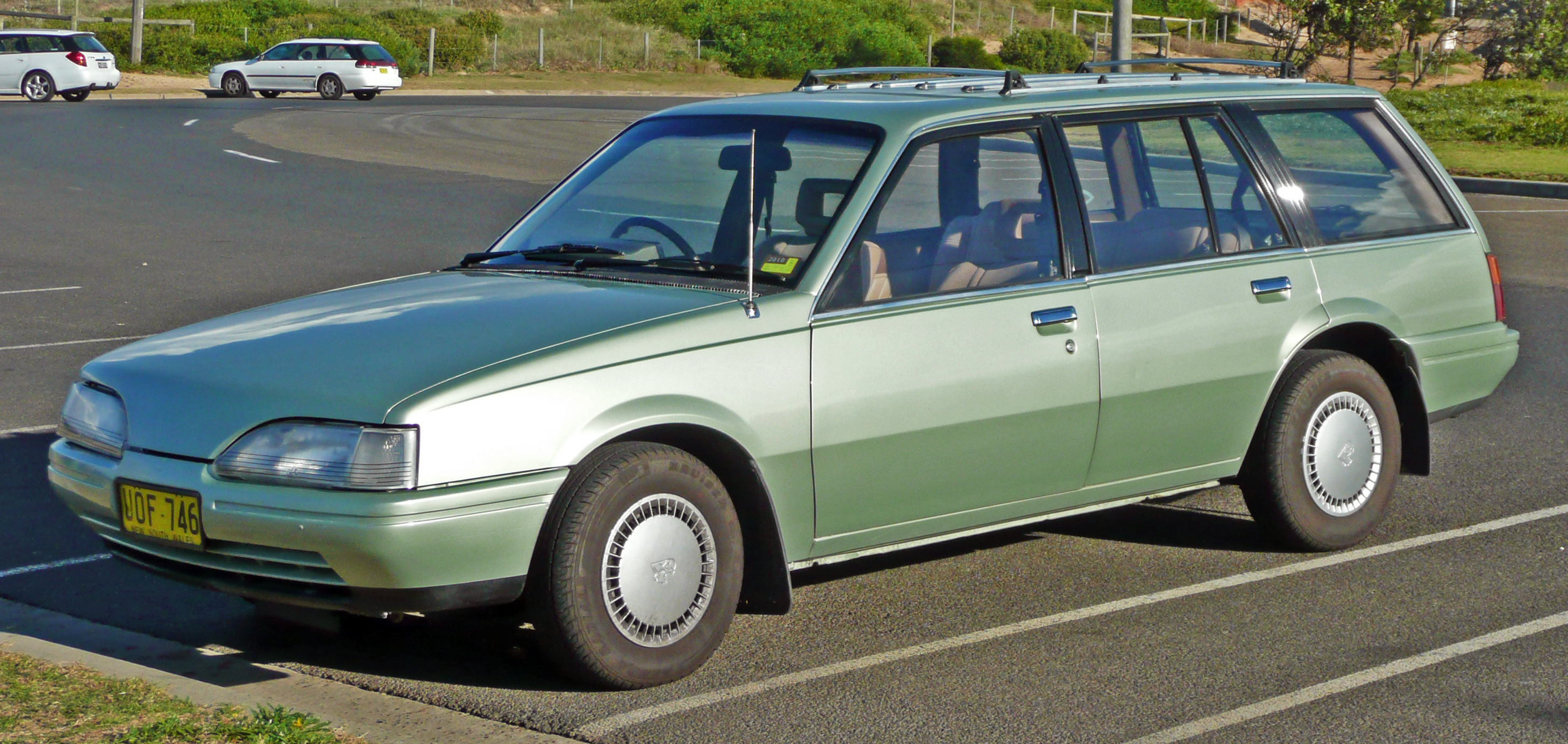
- Holden JD Camira SL/X station wagon

Overview
- Production: 1984–1987 (36,953 produced)

Powertrain
- Engine: 1.6 L Family II I4; 1.8 L Family II I4
- Transmission: 4-speed Muncie M17 manual 5-speed Getrag 282 manual 3-speed Turbo-Hydramatic 125 C automatic

Dimensions
- Wheelbase: 2,577 mm (101.5 in)
- Length: 4,409 mm (173.6 in)
- Width: 1,668 mm (65.7 in)
- Height: 1,359 mm (53.5 in)
- Curb weight: 1,060 kg (2,336.9 lb)

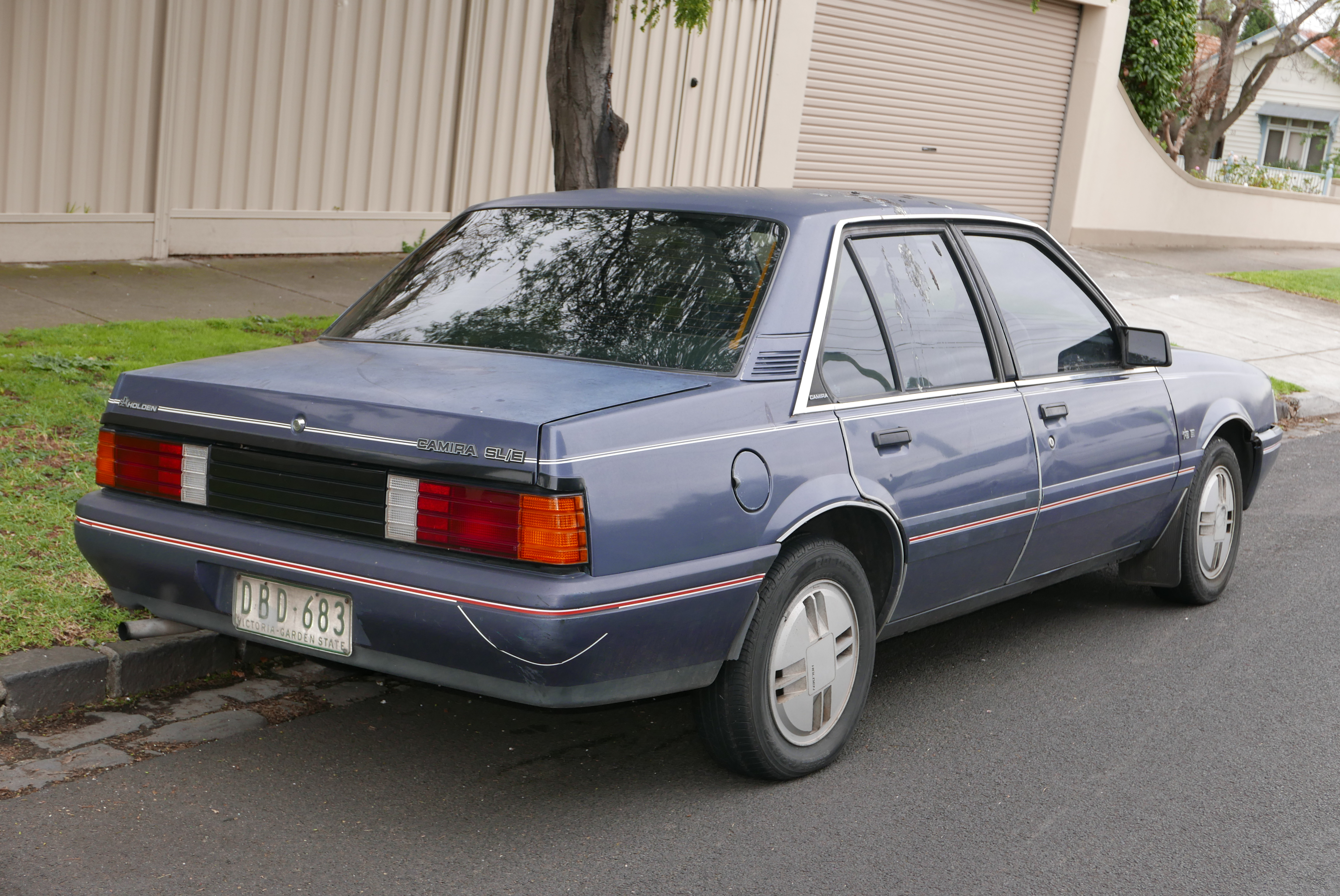
1987 Holden Camira (JD) SLE sedan

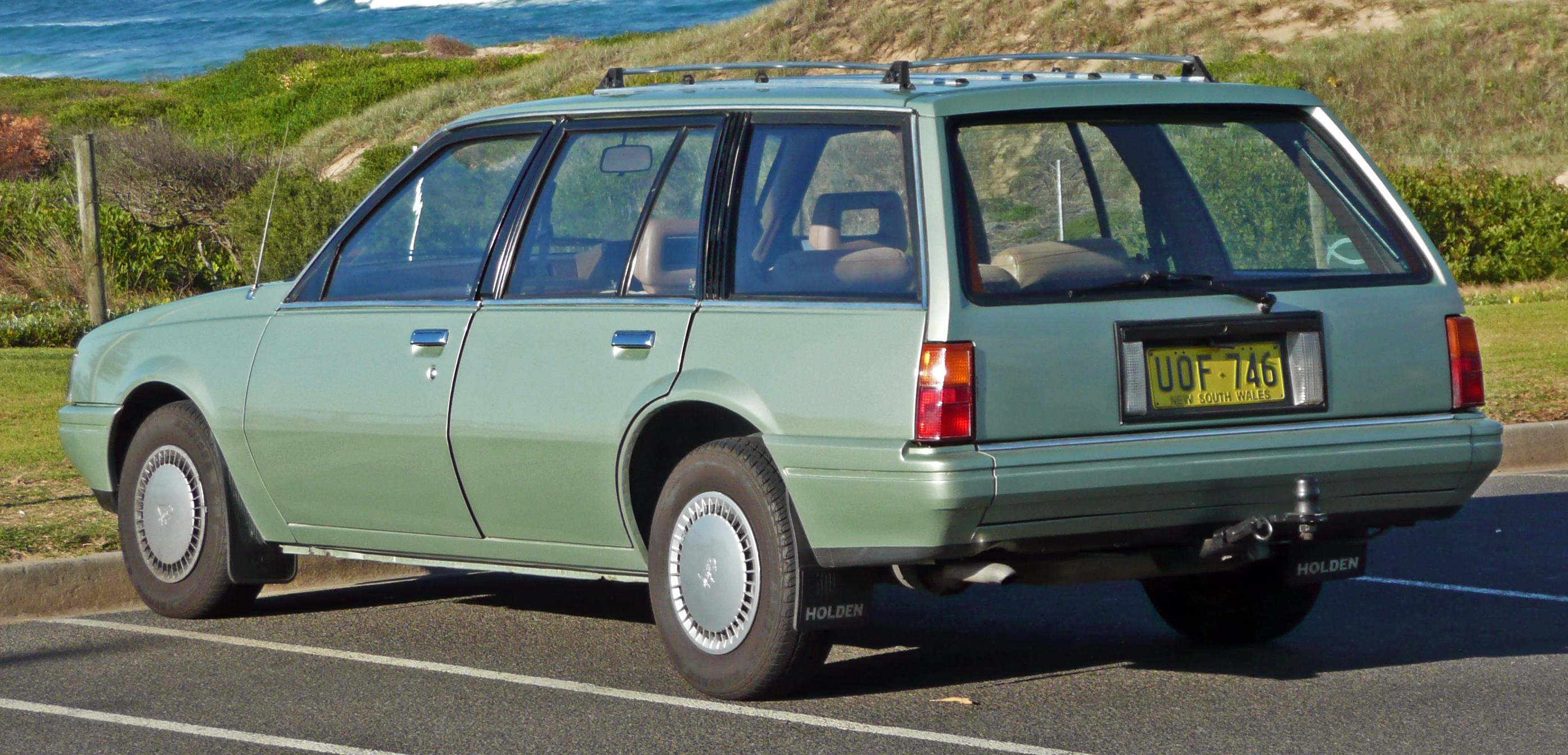
1984–1987 Holden Camira (JD) SL/X wagon

The second series JD Camira, released in November 1984 received a facelift, with a more aerodynamic front-end and the absence of a conventional front grille. The differences were not only cosmetic, the engine was upgraded from 1.6 to a multi-point fuel injected 1.8-litre on the SL/X and SL/E models (the 1.6-litre remained for the SL). These changes combined allowed the engine to deliver 83 kW (111 hp) at 6200 rpm. The new 1.8-litre engine was available with a close-ratio, five-speed manual transmission, as opposed to the regular four-speed unit.

In mid-1986 new emissions regulations required that all cars manufactured in Australia run on unleaded petrol. Firstly, Holden dropped the base 1.6-litre engine. For the 1.8-litre, Holden was forced to engineer another reworking of the engine (all variants prior to this ran on leaded petrol), during which time Holden was operating at a loss. The result was that Holden dropped the multi-point injection for the 1.8-litre and reverted to single-point, akin to a carburettor, and altered the tuning of the engine to suit. A power-robbing catalytic converter was fitted, and power output was reduced by 20 kW (27 hp) to 63 kW (84 hp).

This engine was also used in Holden's locally manufactured compact car, the LD Astra (1987–1989), a badge engineered Nissan Pulsar (N13; 1987–1991), as well as the Pulsar itself. This was the result of a model sharing alliance between Holden and Nissan at the time, where the Nissan body was used in conjunction with GM powertrains. Running on unleaded petrol, this engine had an output of 79 kW (106 hp). The Pulsar's 1.8-litre engine contained the same basic internals as the JD Camira's 1.8-litre engine, with the main exception being the block casting and smaller ports/valves on the head, and smaller intake manifold. Both the Camira and Astra/Pulsar engines were powered by a Delco Electronics engine control unit. This caused problems of its own, as with age, the fine tolerance of the circuitry and componentry have a tendency to fail unexpectedly, and on failing, the engine will cease to operate, or operate with a crippling loss of power due to incorrect tuning and fuel delivery. The external engine mounts are better placed on the Pulsar, and hence result in longer engine mount life.

=== Specification levels ===
- SL, SL/X, and SL/E: as for JB.
- Executive: introduced in 1986 as an option pack for the SL/X. The Executive was first seen on the VK Commodore in 1984.
- Formula: first seen on the JD model, the Formula pack was optional to any model which had special pin striping and side skirts, this pack sold in limited numbers.

== JJ (New Zealand; 1984–1987) ==
In New Zealand the second generation Camira was marketed as the Camira JJ. This consisted of two entirely different J-cars: the sedan version was a rebadged version of the Isuzu Aska from Japan. This decision was made by General Motors New Zealand as sales figures of the Camira JB were poor for this market due to well-publicized quality concerns. However, the wagon version, built and sold in Australia, was retained, albeit no longer assembled locally. In 1987, the JJ was replaced by the Australian-sourced JE Camira as the exchange rates favoured Australian imports.

The Aska-based Camira JJ initially came with two different carburetted Isuzu four-cylinder petrol engines; a 1.8 L (1,817 cc) with 68 kW (91 hp) and a 2.0 L (1,994 cc) with 74 kW (99 hp). Only a five-speed manual transmission was available. A three-speed automatic arrived soon after the introduction. In early 1986, the luxurious Camira SL/E arrived, equipped with power steering, windows, mirrors, locks, a velour interior, a high-end stereo, body-coloured bumpers, and alloy wheels.

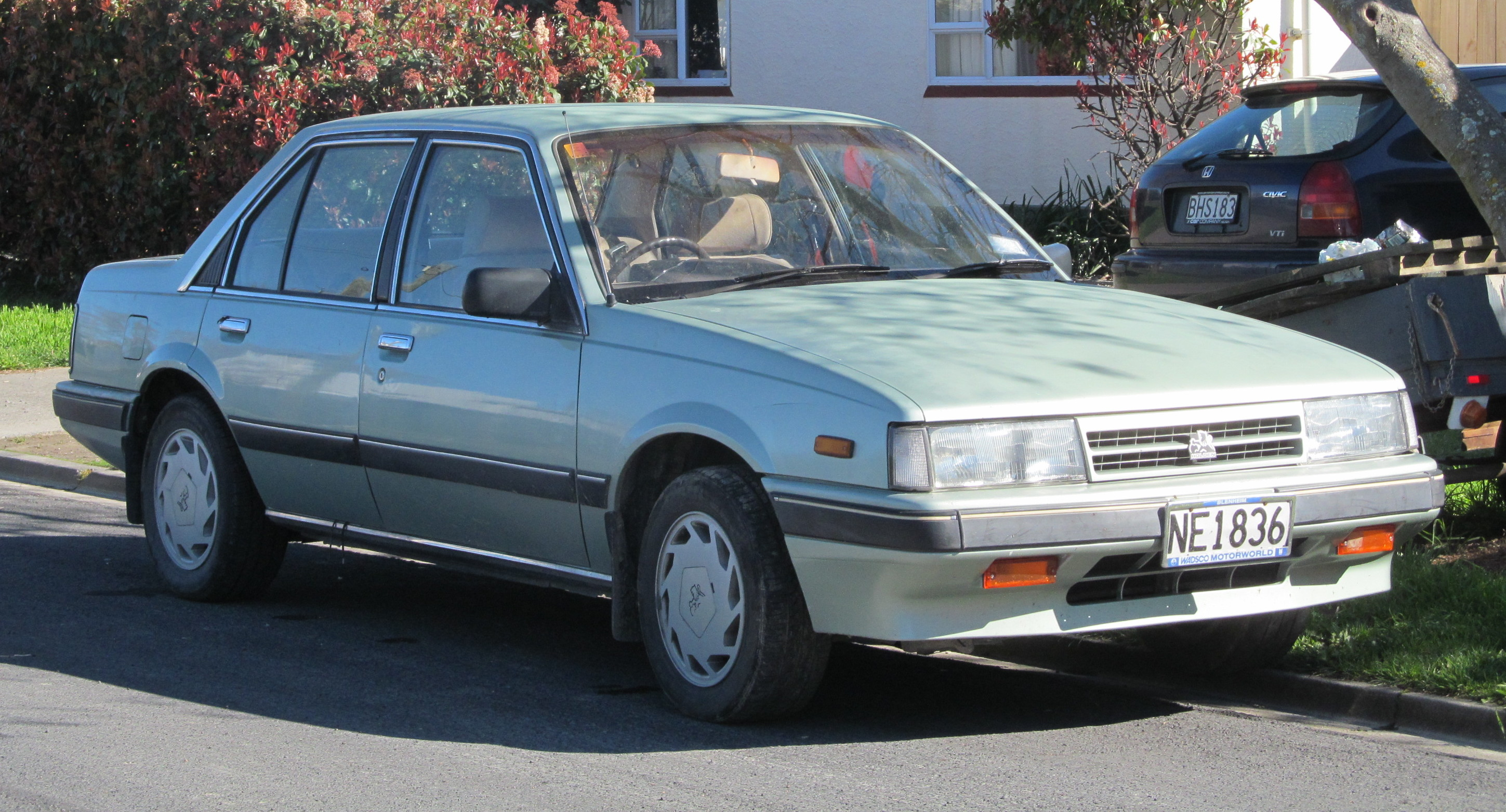
Holden Camira (JJ) SL/E sedan

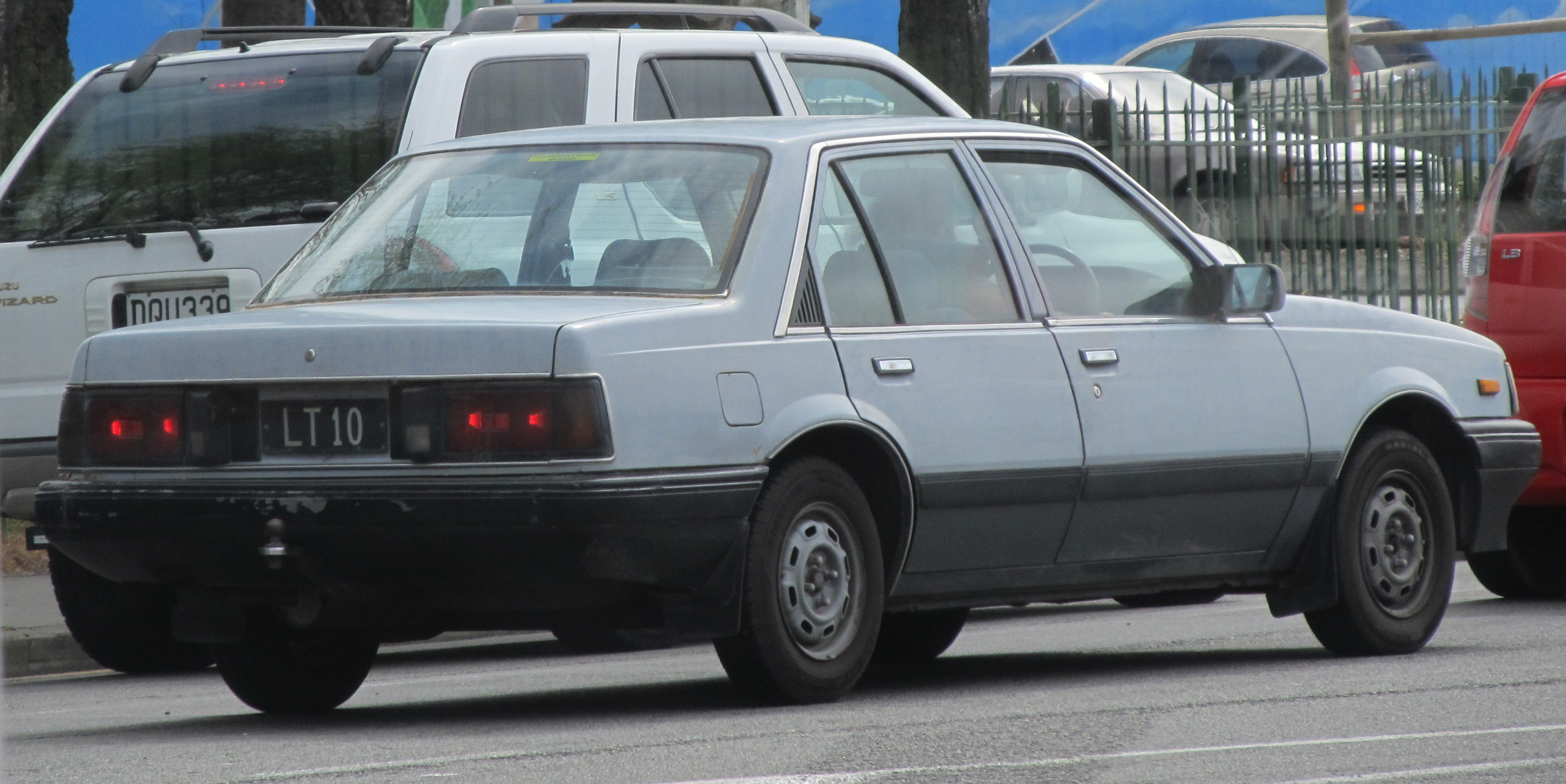
Holden Camira (JJ) L sedan; rear view

== JE (1987–1989) ==
JE
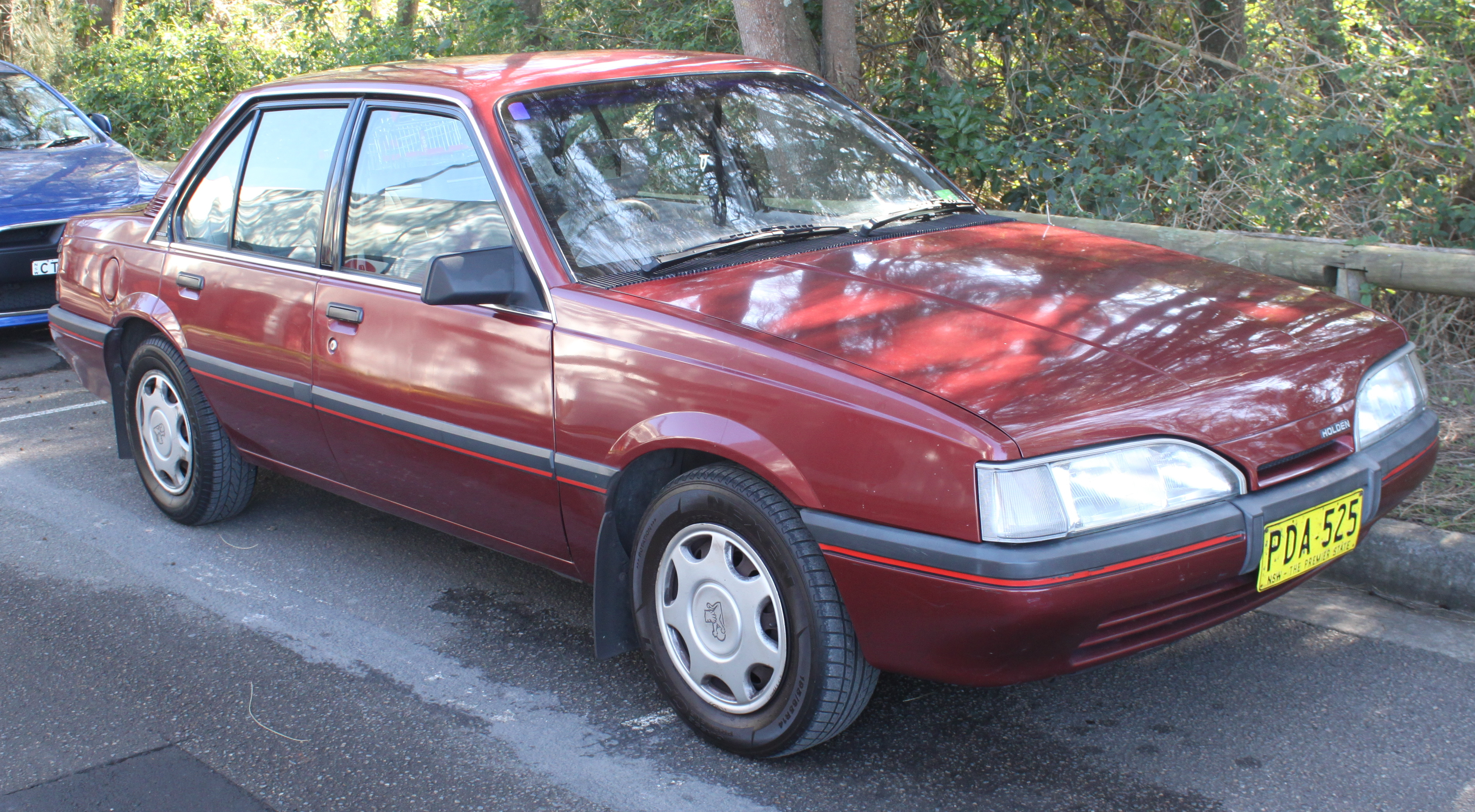
- JE Camira SLX sedan

Overview
- Production: 1987–1989 (29,129 produced)

Powertrain
- Engine: 2.0 L Family II I4
- Transmission: 5-speed Getrag 282 manual 3-speed Turbo-Hydramatic 125 C automatic

Dimensions
- Wheelbase: 2,577 mm (101.5 in)
- Length: 4,408 mm (173.5 in)
- Width: 1,668 mm (65.7 in)
- Height: 1,359 mm (53.5 in)
- Curb weight: 1,086 kg (2,394 lb)

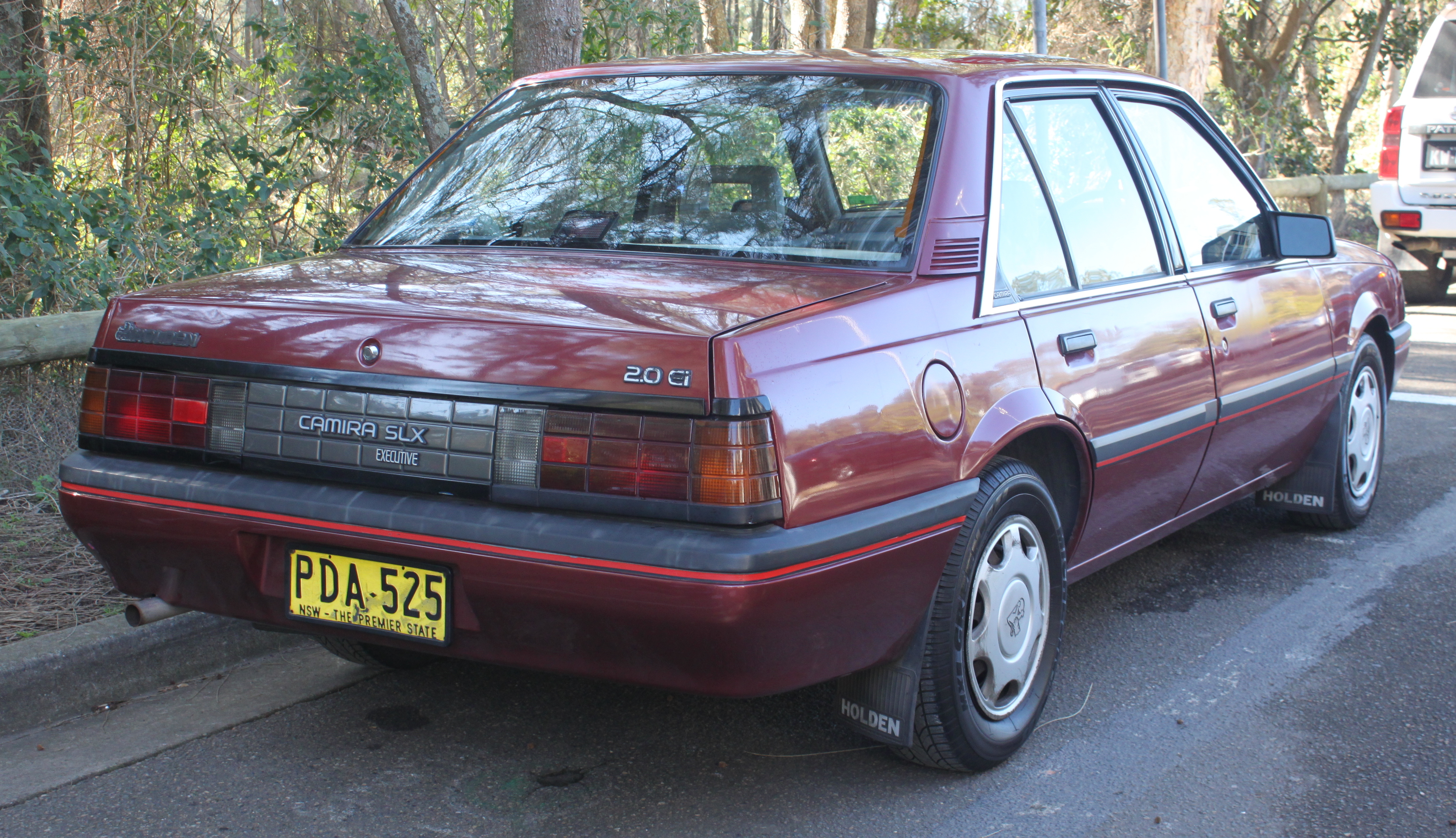
1988 Holden Camira (JD) SLX sedan

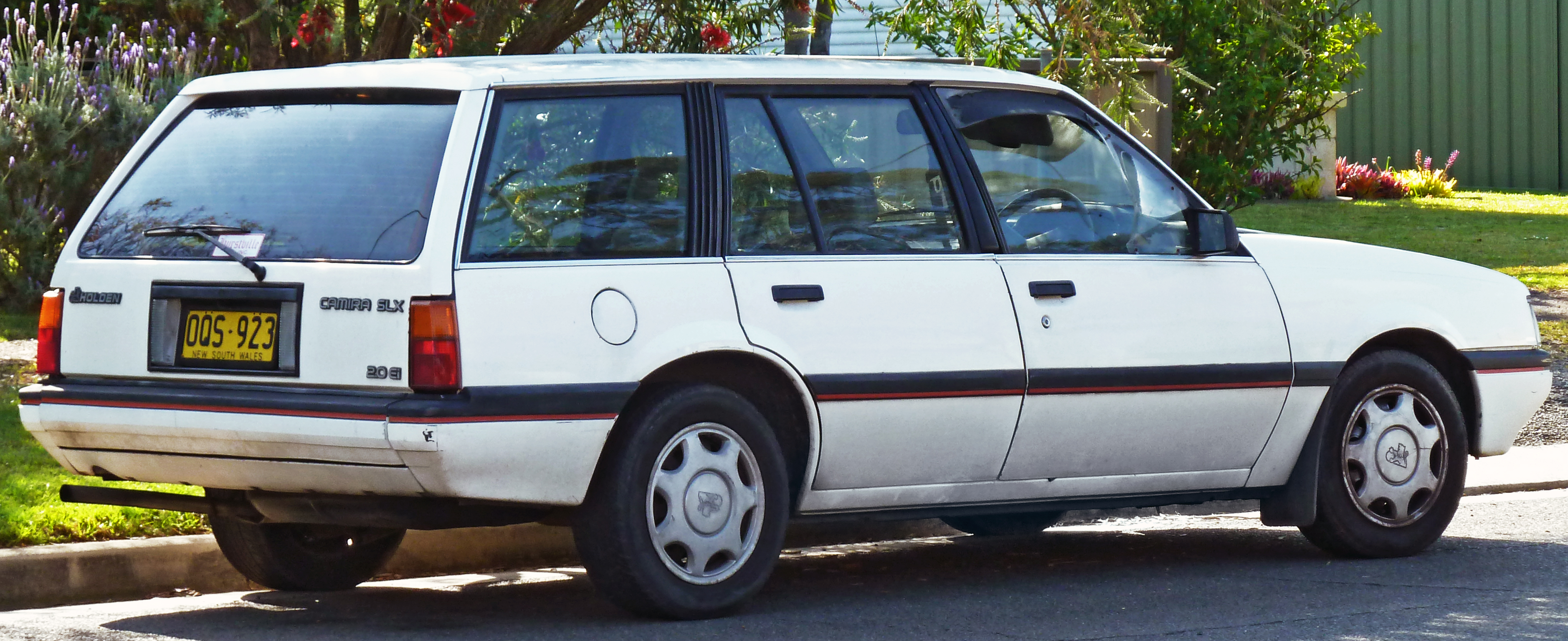
1987–1989 Holden Camira (JE) SL/X station wagon

Released in April 1987, the JE was the final series of Camira. By this time, many of the Camira's early quality problems had been overcome, and Holden now fitted the multi-point fuel-injected 2.0-litre engine to replace the 1.8-litre unit. The 2.0-litre unit delivered 85 kW (114 hp) at 5200 rpm and 176 N⋅m (130 lbf⋅ft) of torque at 3200 rpm. The automatic transaxle in the JE, the Turbo-Hydramatic 125 C, sported a lockup torque converter. Styling changes were minor from the JD with the addition of a thin grille up front, revised bonnet, larger 14-inch wheels and new wheel trims.

After Camira production wound up in August 1989, Holden replaced the Camira with the Apollo, a rebadged Toyota Camry, a result of the Button car plan introduced by the Australian Government, which encouraged a reduction in the number of Australian car-makers and models. General Motors New Zealand was not affected by this scheme and instead replaced the Camira with the European-sourced Opel Vectra, which after 1994 was rebadged as the Holden Vectra. Holden continued to produce the Family II engine for export well after the Camira was discontinued. Over three million variants were produced, in 1.6-, 1.8- and 2.0-litre configurations, with the 1.8- and 2.0-litre variants being fuel injected.

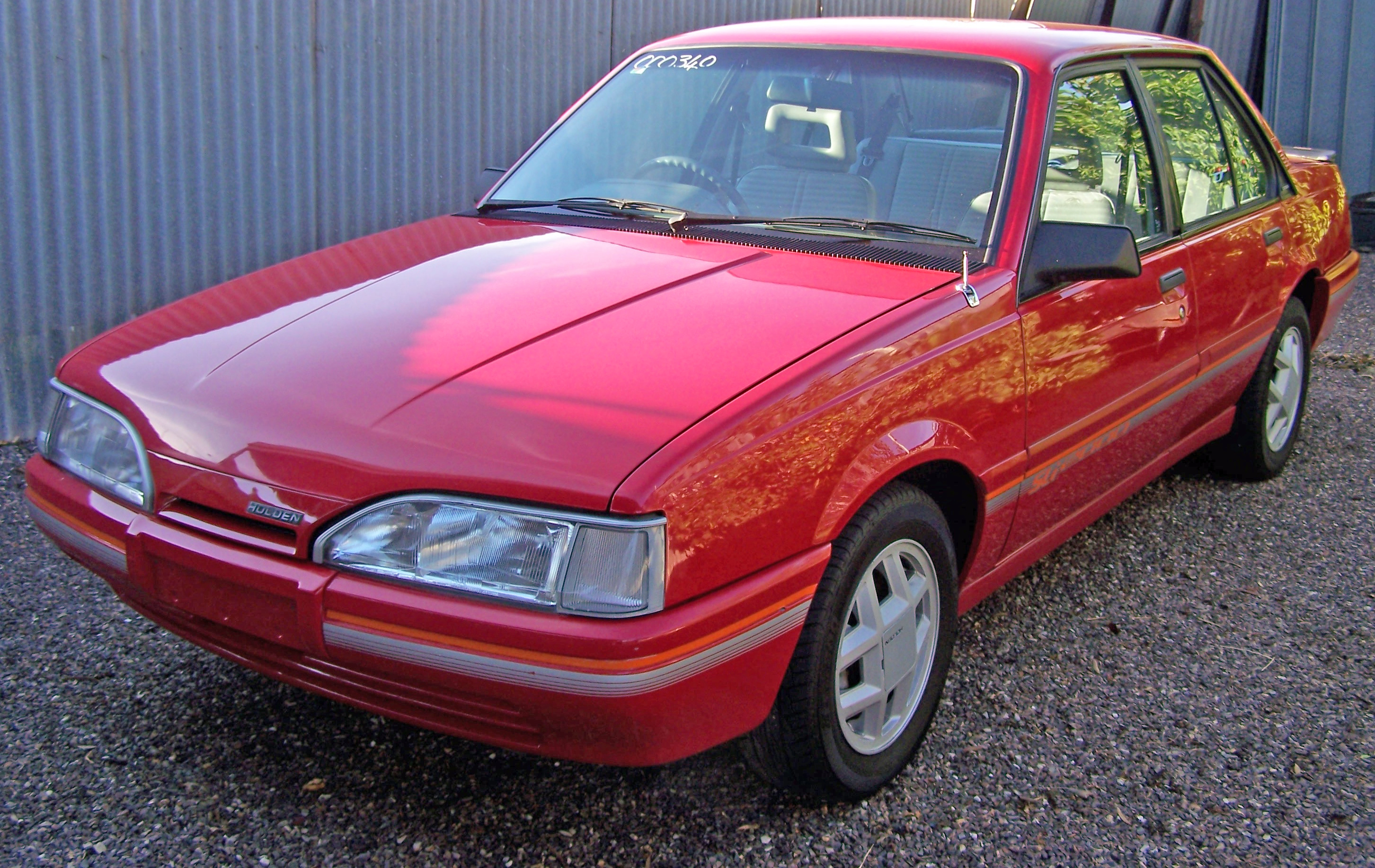
Holden Camira (JE) SLi 2000 sedan

=== Specification levels ===
- SL, SLX, Executive, SLE: as for JB and JD series, except the SLX and SLE nameplates no longer featured the "/" symbol, as in SL/X.
- Vacationer: was a special edition, based on the Executive, painted light blue metallic (an HT Monaro colour) (Also sold in white) with red and white decals, SLX trim, and SLE roof racks (wagons).
- SLi 2000: was unique to the JE, being a "sports" package based on the SLX. Major differences were the addition of side skirts, a small spoiler and distinctive orange and silver pin striping. In somewhat of a marketing ploy, the SLi was only available in red (with the exception of one white 1988 SLi 2000 purchased from new at Wadsco Motor World in Blenheim, NZ) in the sedan body shell with a five-speed manual transaxle, and with a grey interior from the SLX. Despite its sports-oriented nature, the SLi 2000 was powered by the same Family II engine fitted to all other JEs, hence providing no extra performance.
- Formula: was, like the SLi 2000, and could be optioned across the entire sedan range. Skirting and pin striping were also options. Buyers did have the freedom to choose the colour, however all versions had manual transmission and "Formula" headrest inserts.

The Vacationer, SLi 2000 and the Formula were sold in limited numbers and are subsequently rare today, as were cars built with power windows, central locking and automatic boot lid releases.

== Common problems ==
All Camira models suffered from some common problems, which is one of the reasons why the car did not garner significant sales figures.

- Rust often became evident underneath the rear windscreen in almost all sedan models. On wagon models, rust usually occurred in the bottom of the rear door due to inadequate water drainage.
- Models equipped with a manual transmission had a firewall cracking problem, because the clutch mount tore the firewall mounting structure. This was easily rectified or prevented early on, but advanced stages of cracking were difficult to repair due to the awkward location and the need to weld.
- On models fitted with an automatic transmission, the lockup torque converter switch malfunctioned, keeping the torque converter locked in third gear when slowing down and stalling the engine when the car came to standstill. This was due to the poor durability of the plastic switch.
- The engine control unit was notorious for problems. Cracks in the printed circuit board often caused the engine to stall at speed if the board bent, for instance through heat expansion.
- Engine mount breakages were known to occur, especially when the car was driven roughly. This problem was particularly evident in the later fuel injected engines, because the increased engine power correspondingly increased the stress on the Camira's rubber engine mounts.
- The water manifold at the rear of the engine was made of hard polyvinyl chloride (PVC) and splits could occur after many heating and cooling cycles, resulting in a loss of engine coolant.
- The cylinder head was prone to warping, especially when the car was driven frequently. This problem was more pronounced in the later fuel injected models, due to increased engine temperatures and greater stress on that component.
- The JB and early JD which were carburettor equipped, suffered from premature failure of the "sandwich mount" located between the carburettor and intake manifold.
- The instrument panel gauges and their fascias would crack and buckle when exposed to continual sunlight and hot days, more than most makes and models.
- The optional alloy wheels on higher-spec models had very sharp internal surfaces, precluding the possibility of fitting inner tubes to rectify any air leaks/punctures.
- Models with power steering had issues with power steering pumps being beneath the engine which were easily damaged driving over speed bumps.

== Safety ==
The Used Car Safety Ratings, published in 2008 by the Monash University Accident Research Centre, found that 1982–1989 Holden Camiras provide a "significantly worse than average" level of safety in the event of an accident, in a comparison to other "medium cars". The safety rating was not calculated solely on the basis of the protection of the vehicle's occupants, but also included protection for "cyclists, pedestrians and drivers of other vehicles" to give a "better guide to the total community impact of vehicle safety."
