= 1996 ITC Silverstone round =

(United Kingdom) 1996 ITC Silverstone round
Round details
- Round 7 of 13 rounds in the 1996 International Touring Car Championship
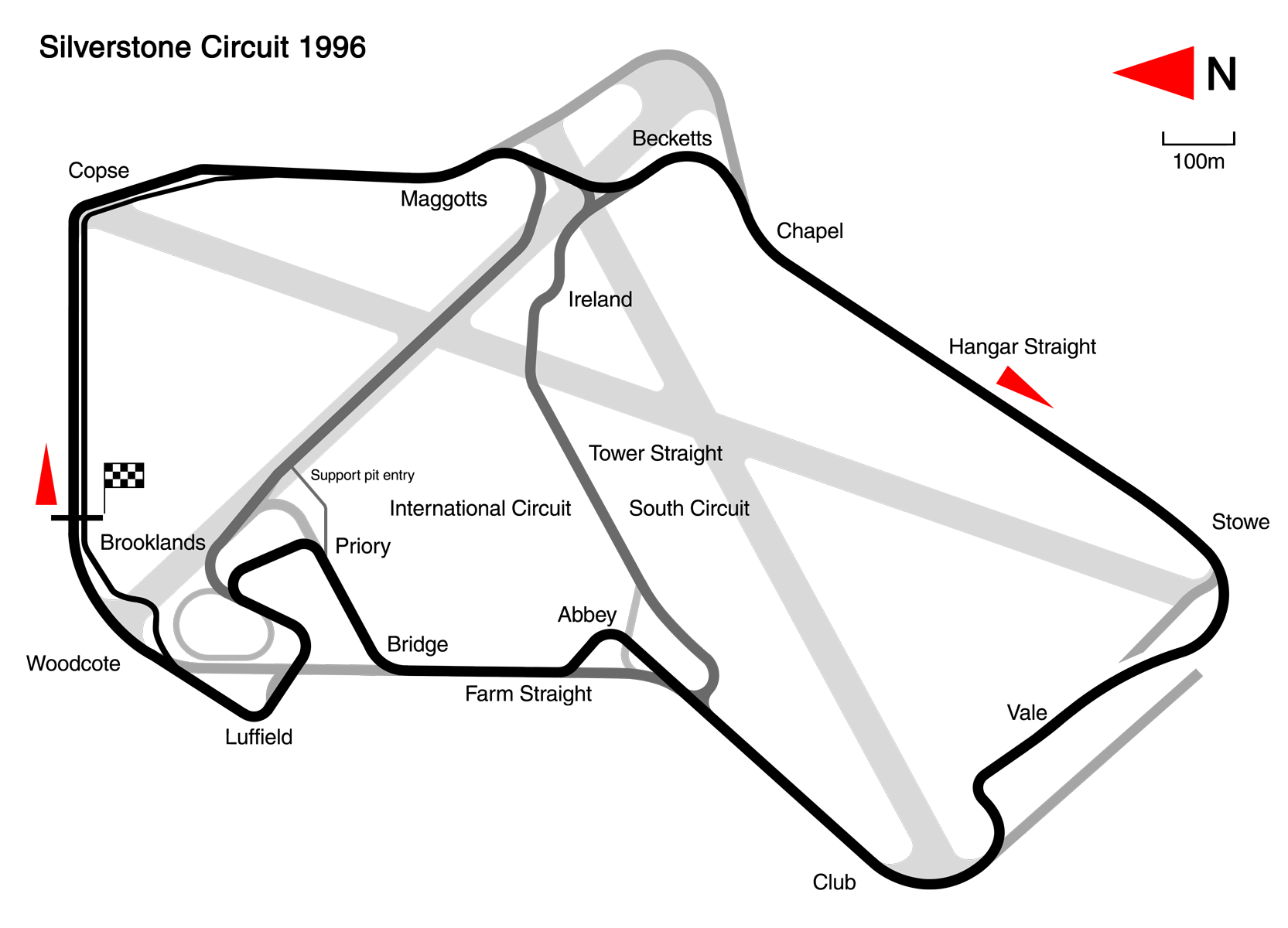
- Layout of the Silverstone Circuit
- Location: Silverstone Circuit, Silverstone, United Kingdom
- Course: Permanent racing facility 5.072 km (3.152 mi)

International Touring Car Championship

Race 1
- Date: 18 August 1996
- Laps: 20

Pole position
Driver	(Germany) Klaus Ludwig	Zakspeed Opel
- Time: 1:46.841

Podium
First	(Germany) Klaus Ludwig	Zakspeed Opel
Second	(Italy) Gabriele Tarquini	JAS Motorsport Alfa Romeo
Third	(Italy) Nicola Larini	Martini Alfa Corse

Fastest lap
Driver	(Italy) Alessandro Nannini	Martini Alfa Corse
- Time: 1:50.173 (on lap 16)

Race 2
- Date: 18 August 1996
- Laps: 20

Podium
First	(Italy) Gabriele Tarquini	JAS Motorsport Alfa Romeo
Second	(Finland) JJ Lehto	Team Rosberg Opel
Third	(Denmark) Jason Watt	Bosch JAS Motorsport Alfa Romeo

Fastest lap
Driver	(Italy) Gabriele Tarquini	JAS Motorsport Alfa Romeo
- Time: 1:49.649 (on lap 3)

The 1996 ITC Silverstone round was the seventh round of the 1996 International Touring Car Championship season. It took place on 18 August at the Silverstone Circuit.

Klaus Ludwig won the first race, starting from pole position, driving an Opel Calibra V6 4x4, and Gabriele Tarquini gained the second one, driving an Alfa Romeo 155 V6 TI.

== Classification ==
=== Qualifying ===
Pos.	No.	Driver	Car	Team	Time	Grid
1	17	(Germany) Klaus Ludwig	Opel Calibra V6 4x4	(Germany) Zakspeed Opel	1:46.841	1
2	18	(Italy) Gabriele Tarquini	Alfa Romeo 155 V6 TI	(Italy) JAS Motorsport Alfa Romeo	1:47.143	2
3	2	(United Kingdom) Dario Franchitti	Mercedes C-Class	(Germany) D2 Mercedes-AMG	1:47.472	3
4	16	(Germany) Uwe Alzen	Opel Calibra V6 4x4	(Germany) Zakspeed Opel	1:47.575	4
5	5	(Italy) Nicola Larini	Alfa Romeo 155 V6 TI	(Italy) Martini Alfa Corse	1:47.815	5
6	6	(Italy) Alessandro Nannini	Alfa Romeo 155 V6 TI	(Italy) Martini Alfa Corse	1:47.875	6
7	7	(Germany) Manuel Reuter	Opel Calibra V6 4x4	(Germany) Joest Racing Opel	1:47.906	7
8	14	(Italy) Giancarlo Fisichella	Alfa Romeo 155 V6 TI	(Italy) TV Spielfilm Alfa Corse	1:47.910	8
9	15	(Germany) Christian Danner	Alfa Romeo 155 V6 TI	(Italy) TV Spielfilm Alfa Corse	1:48.388	9
10	9	(Italy) Stefano Modena	Alfa Romeo 155 V6 TI	(Italy) JAS Motorsport Alfa Romeo	1:48.388	10
11	25	(Austria) Alexander Wurz	Opel Calibra V6 4x4	(Germany) Joest Racing Opel	1:48.406	11
12	1	(Germany) Bernd Schneider	Mercedes C-Class	(Germany) D2 Mercedes-AMG	1:48.491	12
13	19	(Denmark) Jason Watt	Alfa Romeo 155 V6 TI	(Italy) Bosch JAS Motorsport Alfa Romeo	1:48.502	13
14	43	(Finland) JJ Lehto	Opel Calibra V6 4x4	(Germany) Team Rosberg Opel	1:48.566	14
15	11	(Germany) Jörg van Ommen	Mercedes C-Class	(Germany) UPS Mercedes-AMG	1:48.604	15
16	3	(Colombia) Juan Pablo Montoya	Mercedes C-Class	(Germany) Warsteiner Mercedes-AMG	1:48.616	16
17	24	(France) Yannick Dalmas	Opel Calibra V6 4x4	(Germany) Joest Racing Opel	1:48.682	17
18	10	(Germany) Michael Bartels	Alfa Romeo 155 V6 TI	(Italy) Jägermeister JAS Motorsport Alfa Romeo	1:48.878	18
19	12	(Denmark) Kurt Thiim	Mercedes C-Class	(Germany) UPS Mercedes-AMG	1:48.899	19
20	44	(Germany) Hans-Joachim Stuck	Opel Calibra V6 4x4	(Germany) Team Rosberg Opel	1:49.002	20
21	8	(United Kingdom) Oliver Gavin	Opel Calibra V6 4x4	(Germany) Joest Racing Opel	1:49.100	21
22	4	(Germany) Bernd Mayländer	Mercedes C-Class	(Germany) Warsteiner Mercedes-AMG	1:49.456	22
23	22	(Germany) Alexander Grau	Mercedes C-Class	(Germany) Persson Motorsport	1:49.806	23
24	21	(Germany) Ellen Lohr	Mercedes C-Class	(Germany) Persson Motorsport	1:51.782	24
25	13	(Italy) Gianni Giudici	Opel Calibra V6 4x4	(Italy) Giudici Motorsport	1:52.961	25

=== Race 1 ===
Pos.	No.	Driver	Car	Team	Laps	Time/Retired	Grid	Points
1	17	(Germany) Klaus Ludwig	Opel Calibra V6 4x4	(Germany) Zakspeed Opel	20	37:09.972	1	20
2	18	(Italy) Gabriele Tarquini	Alfa Romeo 155 V6 TI	(Italy) JAS Motorsport Alfa Romeo	20	+2.189	2	15
3	5	(Italy) Nicola Larini	Alfa Romeo 155 V6 TI	(Italy) Martini Alfa Corse	20	+12.006	5	12
4	9	(Italy) Stefano Modena	Alfa Romeo 155 V6 TI	(Italy) JAS Motorsport Alfa Romeo	20	+17.094	10	10
5	43	(Finland) JJ Lehto	Opel Calibra V6 4x4	(Germany) Team Rosberg Opel	20	+20.274	14	8
6	7	(Germany) Manuel Reuter	Opel Calibra V6 4x4	(Germany) Joest Racing Opel	20	+28.841	7	6
7	25	(Austria) Alexander Wurz	Opel Calibra V6 4x4	(Germany) Joest Racing Opel	20	+29.852	11	4
8	19	(Denmark) Jason Watt	Alfa Romeo 155 V6 TI	(Italy) Bosch JAS Motorsport Alfa Romeo	20	+29.852	13	3
9	24	(France) Yannick Dalmas	Opel Calibra V6 4x4	(Germany) Joest Racing Opel	20	+31.064	17	2
10	15	(Germany) Christian Danner	Alfa Romeo 155 V6 TI	(Italy) TV Spielfilm Alfa Corse	20	+36.236	9	1
11	8	(United Kingdom) Oliver Gavin	Opel Calibra V6 4x4	(Germany) Joest Racing Opel	20	+40.126	21	
12	44	(Germany) Hans-Joachim Stuck	Opel Calibra V6 4x4	(Germany) Team Rosberg Opel	20	+48.259	20	
13	16	(Germany) Uwe Alzen	Opel Calibra V6 4x4	(Germany) Zakspeed Opel	20	+48.647	4	
14	4	(Germany) Bernd Mayländer	Mercedes C-Class	(Germany) Warsteiner Mercedes-AMG	20	+1:04.214	22	
15	22	(Germany) Alexander Grau	Mercedes C-Class	(Germany) Persson Motorsport	20	+1:04.484	23	
16	1	(Germany) Bernd Schneider	Mercedes C-Class	(Germany) D2 Mercedes-AMG	20	+1:10.460	12	
17	6	(Italy) Alessandro Nannini	Alfa Romeo 155 V6 TI	(Italy) Martini Alfa Corse	20	+1:23.214	6	
18	11	(Germany) Jörg van Ommen	Mercedes C-Class	(Germany) UPS Mercedes-AMG	20	+1:26.578	15	
19	13	(Italy) Gianni Giudici	Opel Calibra V6 4x4	(Italy) Giudici Motorsport	19	+1 lap	25	
20	21	(Germany) Ellen Lohr	Mercedes C-Class	(Germany) Persson Motorsport	19	+1 lap	24	
21	2	(United Kingdom) Dario Franchitti	Mercedes C-Class	(Germany) D2 Mercedes-AMG	19	Retired	3	
Ret	3	(Colombia) Juan Pablo Montoya	Mercedes C-Class	(Germany) Warsteiner Mercedes-AMG	14	Retired	16	
Ret	12	(Denmark) Kurt Thiim	Mercedes C-Class	(Germany) UPS Mercedes-AMG	2	Retired	19	
Ret	14	(Italy) Giancarlo Fisichella	Alfa Romeo 155 V6 TI	(Italy) TV Spielfilm Alfa Corse	1	Retired	8	
DSQ	10	(Germany) Michael Bartels	Alfa Romeo 155 V6 TI	(Italy) Jägermeister JAS Motorsport Alfa Romeo	20	+41.271^{1}	18	

Notes:

- ^1 – Michael Bartels was disqualified for causing collisions with Dario Franchitti and Kurt Thiim.

=== Race 2 ===
Pos.	No.	Driver	Car	Team	Laps	Time/Retired	Grid	Points
1	18	(Italy) Gabriele Tarquini	Alfa Romeo 155 V6 TI	(Italy) JAS Motorsport Alfa Romeo	20	36:59.407	2	20
2	43	(Finland) JJ Lehto	Opel Calibra V6 4x4	(Germany) Team Rosberg Opel	20	+3.728	5	15
3	19	(Denmark) Jason Watt	Alfa Romeo 155 V6 TI	(Italy) Bosch JAS Motorsport Alfa Romeo	20	+14.246	8	12
4	25	(Austria) Alexander Wurz	Opel Calibra V6 4x4	(Germany) Joest Racing Opel	20	+16.366	7	10
5	1	(Germany) Bernd Schneider	Mercedes C-Class	(Germany) D2 Mercedes-AMG	20	+22.944	16	8
6	7	(Germany) Manuel Reuter	Opel Calibra V6 4x4	(Germany) Joest Racing Opel	20	+25.897	6	6
7	24	(France) Yannick Dalmas	Opel Calibra V6 4x4	(Germany) Joest Racing Opel	20	+44.466	9	4
8	10	(Germany) Michael Bartels	Alfa Romeo 155 V6 TI	(Italy) Jägermeister JAS Motorsport Alfa Romeo	20	+45.842	25	3
9	4	(Germany) Bernd Mayländer	Mercedes C-Class	(Germany) Warsteiner Mercedes-AMG	20	+47.756	14	2
10	14	(Italy) Giancarlo Fisichella	Alfa Romeo 155 V6 TI	(Italy) TV Spielfilm Alfa Corse	20	+48.454	24	1
11	12	(Denmark) Kurt Thiim	Mercedes C-Class	(Germany) UPS Mercedes-AMG	20	+50.867	11	
12	6	(Italy) Alessandro Nannini	Alfa Romeo 155 V6 TI	(Italy) Martini Alfa Corse	20	+1:26.888	17	
13	21	(Germany) Ellen Lohr	Mercedes C-Class	(Germany) Persson Motorsport	20	+1:58.448	20	
14	15	(Germany) Christian Danner	Alfa Romeo 155 V6 TI	(Italy) TV Spielfilm Alfa Corse	19	+1 lap	10	
15	2	(United Kingdom) Dario Franchitti	Mercedes C-Class	(Germany) D2 Mercedes-AMG	19	+1 lap	21	
16	44	(Germany) Hans-Joachim Stuck	Opel Calibra V6 4x4	(Germany) Team Rosberg Opel	19	+1 lap	12	
Ret	5	(Italy) Nicola Larini	Alfa Romeo 155 V6 TI	(Italy) Martini Alfa Corse	18	Retired	3	
Ret	8	(United Kingdom) Oliver Gavin	Opel Calibra V6 4x4	(Germany) Joest Racing Opel	12	Retired	11	
Ret	16	(Germany) Uwe Alzen	Opel Calibra V6 4x4	(Germany) Zakspeed Opel	9	Retired	13	
Ret	13	(Italy) Gianni Giudici	Opel Calibra V6 4x4	(Italy) Giudici Motorsport	9	Retired	19	
Ret	3	(Colombia) Juan Pablo Montoya	Mercedes C-Class	(Germany) Warsteiner Mercedes-AMG	8	Retired	22	
Ret	11	(Germany) Jörg van Ommen	Mercedes C-Class	(Germany) UPS Mercedes-AMG	7	Retired	18	
Ret	22	(Germany) Alexander Grau	Mercedes C-Class	(Germany) Persson Motorsport	2	Retired	15	
Ret	17	(Germany) Klaus Ludwig	Opel Calibra V6 4x4	(Germany) Zakspeed Opel	2	Retired	1	
Ret	9	(Italy) Stefano Modena	Alfa Romeo 155 V6 TI	(Italy) JAS Motorsport Alfa Romeo	1	Retired	4	

== Standings after the event ==
Drivers' Championship standings

	Pos	Driver	Points
	1	(Germany) Manuel Reuter	149
1	2	(Germany) Bernd Schneider	97
1	3	(Germany) Hans-Joachim Stuck	94
2	4	(Finland) JJ Lehto	92
2	5	(Germany) Klaus Ludwig	84

Manufacturers' Championship standings

Pos	Driver	Points
1	(Germany) Opel	224
2	(Germany) Mercedes	149
3	(Italy) Alfa Romeo	146

- Note: Only the top five positions are included for both sets of drivers' standings.
