= 1996 ITC Magny-Cours round =

(France) 1996 ITC Magny-Cours round
Round details
- Round 9 of 13 rounds in the 1996 International Touring Car Championship
- Layout of the Circuit de Nevers Magny-Cours
- Location: Circuit de Nevers Magny-Cours, Magny-Cours, France
- Course: Permanent racing facility 4.250 km (2.641 mi)

International Touring Car Championship

Race 1
- Date: 15 September 1996
- Laps: 24

Pole position
Driver	(Italy) Nicola Larini	Martini Alfa Corse
- Time: 1:33.007

Podium
First	(Italy) Alessandro Nannini	Martini Alfa Corse
Second	(Italy) Nicola Larini	Martini Alfa Corse
Third	(Italy) Giancarlo Fisichella	TV Spielfilm Alfa Corse

Fastest lap
Driver	(Italy) Giancarlo Fisichella	TV Spielfilm Alfa Corse
- Time: 1:36.169 (on lap 4)

Race 2
- Date: 15 September 1996
- Laps: 24

Podium
First	(Italy) Alessandro Nannini	Martini Alfa Corse
Second	(Italy) Giancarlo Fisichella	TV Spielfilm Alfa Corse
Third	(Finland) JJ Lehto	Team Rosberg Opel

Fastest lap
Driver	(Italy) Giancarlo Fisichella	TV Spielfilm Alfa Corse
- Time: 1:34.918 (on lap 6)

The 1996 ITC Magny-Cours round was the ninth round of the 1996 International Touring Car Championship season. It took place on 15 September at the Circuit de Nevers Magny-Cours.

Alessandro Nannini won both races, driving an Alfa Romeo 155 V6 TI.

== Classification ==
=== Qualifying ===
Pos.	No.	Driver	Car	Team	Time	Grid
1	5	(Italy) Nicola Larini	Alfa Romeo 155 V6 TI	(Italy) Martini Alfa Corse	1:33.007	1
2	14	(Italy) Giancarlo Fisichella	Alfa Romeo 155 V6 TI	(Italy) TV Spielfilm Alfa Corse	1:33.284	2
3	6	(Italy) Alessandro Nannini	Alfa Romeo 155 V6 TI	(Italy) Martini Alfa Corse	1:33.376	3
4	16	(Germany) Uwe Alzen	Opel Calibra V6 4x4	(Germany) Zakspeed Opel	1:33.436	4
5	43	(Finland) JJ Lehto	Opel Calibra V6 4x4	(Germany) Team Rosberg Opel	1:33.527	5
6	2	(United Kingdom) Dario Franchitti	Mercedes C-Class	(Germany) D2 Mercedes-AMG	1:33.648	6
7	7	(Germany) Manuel Reuter	Opel Calibra V6 4x4	(Germany) Joest Racing Opel	1:33.859	7
8	1	(Germany) Bernd Schneider	Mercedes C-Class	(Germany) D2 Mercedes-AMG	1:34.012	8
9	17	(Germany) Klaus Ludwig	Opel Calibra V6 4x4	(Germany) Zakspeed Opel	1:34.027	9
10	18	(Italy) Gabriele Tarquini	Alfa Romeo 155 V6 TI	(Italy) JAS Motorsport Alfa Romeo	1:34.092	10
11	11	(Germany) Jörg van Ommen	Mercedes C-Class	(Germany) UPS Mercedes-AMG	1:34.095	11
12	4	(Germany) Bernd Mayländer	Mercedes C-Class	(Germany) Warsteiner Mercedes-AMG	1:38.564	12
13	8	(United Kingdom) Oliver Gavin	Opel Calibra V6 4x4	(Germany) Joest Racing Opel	1:34.437	13
14	12	(Denmark) Kurt Thiim	Mercedes C-Class	(Germany) UPS Mercedes-AMG	1:34.696	14
15	25	(Austria) Alexander Wurz	Opel Calibra V6 4x4	(Germany) Joest Racing Opel	1:34.754	15
16	9	(Italy) Stefano Modena	Alfa Romeo 155 V6 TI	(Italy) JAS Motorsport Alfa Romeo	1:34.782	16
17	44	(Germany) Hans-Joachim Stuck	Opel Calibra V6 4x4	(Germany) Team Rosberg Opel	1:34.805	17
18	24	(France) Yannick Dalmas	Opel Calibra V6 4x4	(Germany) Joest Racing Opel	1:34.915	18
19	3	(Denmark) Jan Magnussen	Mercedes C-Class	(Germany) Warsteiner Mercedes-AMG	1:35.036	19
20	19	(Denmark) Jason Watt	Alfa Romeo 155 V6 TI	(Italy) Bosch JAS Motorsport Alfa Romeo	1:35.200	20
21	15	(Germany) Christian Danner	Alfa Romeo 155 V6 TI	(Italy) TV Spielfilm Alfa Corse	1:35.546	21
22	10	(Germany) Michael Bartels	Alfa Romeo 155 V6 TI	(Italy) Jägermeister JAS Motorsport Alfa Romeo	1:35.804	22
23	21	(Germany) Alexander Grau	Mercedes C-Class	(Germany) Persson Motorsport	1:35.986	23
24	22	(Germany) Ellen Lohr	Mercedes C-Class	(Germany) Persson Motorsport	1:37.253	24

=== Race 1 ===
Pos.	No.	Driver	Car	Team	Laps	Time/Retired	Grid	Points
1	6	(Italy) Alessandro Nannini	Alfa Romeo 155 V6 TI	(Italy) Martini Alfa Corse	24	38:59.575	3	20
2	5	(Italy) Nicola Larini	Alfa Romeo 155 V6 TI	(Italy) Martini Alfa Corse	24	+0.476	1	15
3	14	(Italy) Giancarlo Fisichella	Alfa Romeo 155 V6 TI	(Italy) TV Spielfilm Alfa Corse	24	+0.903	2	12
4	16	(Germany) Uwe Alzen	Opel Calibra V6 4x4	(Germany) Zakspeed Opel	24	+1.825	4	10
5	43	(Finland) JJ Lehto	Opel Calibra V6 4x4	(Germany) Team Rosberg Opel	24	+3.692	5	8
6	2	(United Kingdom) Dario Franchitti	Mercedes C-Class	(Germany) D2 Mercedes-AMG	24	+4.315	7	6
7	44	(Germany) Hans-Joachim Stuck	Opel Calibra V6 4x4	(Germany) Team Rosberg Opel	24	+21.253	17	4
8	11	(Germany) Jörg van Ommen	Mercedes C-Class	(Germany) UPS Mercedes-AMG	24	+26.834	11	3
9	17	(Germany) Klaus Ludwig	Opel Calibra V6 4x4	(Germany) Zakspeed Opel	24	+30.208	9	2
10	25	(Austria) Alexander Wurz	Opel Calibra V6 4x4	(Germany) Joest Racing Opel	24	+30.664	15	1
11	12	(Denmark) Kurt Thiim	Mercedes C-Class	(Germany) UPS Mercedes-AMG	24	+31.215	14	
12	8	(United Kingdom) Oliver Gavin	Opel Calibra V6 4x4	(Germany) Joest Racing Opel	24	+33.233	13	
13	9	(Italy) Stefano Modena	Alfa Romeo 155 V6 TI	(Italy) JAS Motorsport Alfa Romeo	24	+51.338	16	
14	21	(Germany) Alexander Grau	Mercedes C-Class	(Germany) Persson Motorsport	24	+1:05.653	23	
15	18	(Italy) Gabriele Tarquini	Alfa Romeo 155 V6 TI	(Italy) JAS Motorsport Alfa Romeo	24	+1:10.700^{1}	10	
16	15	(Germany) Christian Danner	Alfa Romeo 155 V6 TI	(Italy) TV Spielfilm Alfa Corse	21	Retired	21	
Ret	22	(Germany) Ellen Lohr	Mercedes C-Class	(Germany) Persson Motorsport	21	Retired	24	
Ret	7	(Germany) Manuel Reuter	Opel Calibra V6 4x4	(Germany) Joest Racing Opel	13	Retired	7	
Ret	19	(Denmark) Jason Watt	Alfa Romeo 155 V6 TI	(Italy) Bosch JAS Motorsport Alfa Romeo	13	Retired	20	
Ret	10	(Germany) Michael Bartels	Alfa Romeo 155 V6 TI	(Italy) Jägermeister JAS Motorsport Alfa Romeo	12	Retired	22	
Ret	1	(Germany) Bernd Schneider	Mercedes C-Class	(Germany) D2 Mercedes-AMG	6	Retired	8	
Ret	24	(France) Yannick Dalmas	Opel Calibra V6 4x4	(Germany) Joest Racing Opel	6	Retired	18	
Ret	3	(Denmark) Jan Magnussen	Mercedes C-Class	(Germany) Warsteiner Mercedes-AMG	3	Retired	19	
Ret	4	(Germany) Bernd Mayländer	Mercedes C-Class	(Germany) Warsteiner Mercedes-AMG	2	Retired	12	

Notes:

- ^1 – Gabriele Tarquini was given a 35-second penalty for causing a collision with Yannick Dalmas.

=== Race 2 ===
Pos.	No.	Driver	Car	Team	Laps	Time/Retired	Grid	Points
1	6	(Italy) Alessandro Nannini	Alfa Romeo 155 V6 TI	(Italy) Martini Alfa Corse	24	38:34.993	1	20
2	14	(Italy) Giancarlo Fisichella	Alfa Romeo 155 V6 TI	(Italy) TV Spielfilm Alfa Corse	24	+0.428	3	15
3	43	(Finland) JJ Lehto	Opel Calibra V6 4x4	(Germany) Team Rosberg Opel	24	+4.931	5	12
4	2	(United Kingdom) Dario Franchitti	Mercedes C-Class	(Germany) D2 Mercedes-AMG	24	+9.651	3	10
5	17	(Germany) Klaus Ludwig	Opel Calibra V6 4x4	(Germany) Zakspeed Opel	24	+12.585	9	8
6	25	(Austria) Alexander Wurz	Opel Calibra V6 4x4	(Germany) Joest Racing Opel	24	+27.395	10	6
7	9	(Italy) Stefano Modena	Alfa Romeo 155 V6 TI	(Italy) JAS Motorsport Alfa Romeo	24	+31.787	13	4
8	1	(Germany) Bernd Schneider	Mercedes C-Class	(Germany) D2 Mercedes-AMG	24	+32.533	21	3
9	11	(Germany) Jörg van Ommen	Mercedes C-Class	(Germany) UPS Mercedes-AMG	24	+38.953	8	2
10	12	(Denmark) Kurt Thiim	Mercedes C-Class	(Germany) UPS Mercedes-AMG	24	+42.167	11	1
11	21	(Germany) Alexander Grau	Mercedes C-Class	(Germany) Persson Motorsport	24	+54.115	14	
12	19	(Denmark) Jason Watt	Alfa Romeo 155 V6 TI	(Italy) Bosch JAS Motorsport Alfa Romeo	24	+1:04.655	19	
13	16	(Germany) Uwe Alzen	Opel Calibra V6 4x4	(Germany) Zakspeed Opel	24	+1:06.198	4	
14	22	(Germany) Ellen Lohr	Mercedes C-Class	(Germany) Persson Motorsport	24	+1:20.920	17	
15	8	(United Kingdom) Oliver Gavin	Opel Calibra V6 4x4	(Germany) Joest Racing Opel	23	+1 lap	12	
Ret	18	(Italy) Gabriele Tarquini	Alfa Romeo 155 V6 TI	(Italy) JAS Motorsport Alfa Romeo	19	Retired	15	
Ret	44	(Germany) Hans-Joachim Stuck	Opel Calibra V6 4x4	(Germany) Team Rosberg Opel	18	Retired	7	
Ret	5	(Italy) Nicola Larini	Alfa Romeo 155 V6 TI	(Italy) Martini Alfa Corse	5	Retired	2	
Ret	3	(Denmark) Jan Magnussen	Mercedes C-Class	(Germany) Warsteiner Mercedes-AMG	2	Retired	23	
DNS	15	(Germany) Christian Danner	Alfa Romeo 155 V6 TI	(Italy) TV Spielfilm Alfa Corse		Did not start	16	
DNS	7	(Germany) Manuel Reuter	Opel Calibra V6 4x4	(Germany) Joest Racing Opel		Did not start	18	
DNS	10	(Germany) Michael Bartels	Alfa Romeo 155 V6 TI	(Italy) Jägermeister JAS Motorsport Alfa Romeo		Did not start	20	
DNS	24	(France) Yannick Dalmas	Opel Calibra V6 4x4	(Germany) Joest Racing Opel		Did not start	22	
DNS	4	(Germany) Bernd Mayländer	Mercedes C-Class	(Germany) Warsteiner Mercedes-AMG		Did not start	25	

== Standings after the event ==
Drivers' Championship standings

	Pos	Driver	Points
	1	(Germany) Manuel Reuter	159
3	2	(Italy) Alessandro Nannini	137
1	3	(Germany) Bernd Schneider	130
	4	(Finland) JJ Lehto	124
2	5	(United Kingdom) Dario Franchitti	121

Manufacturers' Championship standings

Pos	Driver	Points
1	(Germany) Opel	264
2	(Italy) Alfa Romeo	226
3	(Germany) Mercedes	195

- Note: Only the top five positions are included for both sets of drivers' standings.
