= 1996 ITC Suzuka round =

International Touring Car Championship round

(Japan) 1996 ITC Suzuka round
Round details
- Round 13 of 13 rounds in the 1996 International Touring Car Championship
- Layout of the Suzuka Circuit
- Location: Suzuka Circuit, Suzuka, Japan
- Course: Permanent racing facility 5.860 km (3.641 mi)

International Touring Car Championship

Race 1
- Date: 10 November 1996
- Laps: 18

Pole position
Driver	(Germany) Christian Danner	TV Spielfilm Alfa Corse
- Time: 2:02.737

Podium
First	(United Kingdom) Dario Franchitti	D2 Mercedes-AMG
Second	(Germany) Christian Danner	TV Spielfilm Alfa Corse
Third	(Germany) Bernd Schneider	D2 Mercedes-AMG

Fastest lap
Driver	(Germany) Christian Danner	TV Spielfilm Alfa Corse
- Time: 2:05.278 (on lap 2)

Race 2
- Date: 10 November 1996
- Laps: 18

Podium
First	(Germany) Bernd Schneider	D2 Mercedes-AMG
Second	(Italy) Giancarlo Fisichella	TV Spielfilm Alfa Corse
Third	(Denmark) Jan Magnussen	Warsteiner Mercedes-AMG

Fastest lap
Driver	(Germany) Bernd Schneider	D2 Mercedes-AMG
- Time: 2:03.886 (on lap 2)

The 1996 ITC Suzuka round was the thirteenth and final round of the 1996 International Touring Car Championship season. It took place on 10 November at the Suzuka Circuit.

Dario Franchitti won the first race, starting from ninth position, and Bernd Schneider gained the second one, both driving a Mercedes C-Class.

Manuel Reuter won the title, besides he didn't take points from this round.

== Classification ==
=== Qualifying ===
Pos.	No.	Driver	Car	Team	Time	Group	Grid
1	15	(Germany) Christian Danner	Alfa Romeo 155 V6 TI	(Italy) TV Spielfilm Alfa Corse	2:02.737	A	1
2	1	(Germany) Bernd Schneider	Mercedes C-Class	(Germany) D2 Mercedes-AMG	2:02.924	A	2
3	9	(Italy) Stefano Modena	Alfa Romeo 155 V6 TI	(Italy) JAS Motorsport Alfa Romeo	2:03.099	A	3
4	5	(Italy) Nicola Larini	Alfa Romeo 155 V6 TI	(Italy) Martini Alfa Corse	2:03.100	A	4
5	14	(Italy) Giancarlo Fisichella	Alfa Romeo 155 V6 TI	(Italy) TV Spielfilm Alfa Corse	2:03.349	A	5
6	6	(Italy) Alessandro Nannini	Alfa Romeo 155 V6 TI	(Italy) Martini Alfa Corse	2:03.476	A	6
7	4	(Germany) Bernd Mayländer	Mercedes C-Class	(Germany) Warsteiner Mercedes-AMG	2:04.756	A	7
8	18	(Italy) Gabriele Tarquini	Alfa Romeo 155 V6 TI	(Italy) JAS Motorsport Alfa Romeo	2:04.999	A	8
9	2	(United Kingdom) Dario Franchitti	Mercedes C-Class	(Germany) D2 Mercedes-AMG	no time	A	9
10	3	(Denmark) Jan Magnussen	Mercedes C-Class	(Germany) Warsteiner Mercedes-AMG	no time	A	10
11	16	(Germany) Uwe Alzen	Opel Calibra V6 4x4	(Germany) Zakspeed Opel	2:03.461	B	11
12	43	(Finland) JJ Lehto	Opel Calibra V6 4x4	(Germany) Team Rosberg Opel	2:03.650	B	12
13	11	(Germany) Jörg van Ommen	Mercedes C-Class	(Germany) UPS Mercedes-AMG	2:03.734	B	13
14	7	(Germany) Manuel Reuter	Opel Calibra V6 4x4	(Germany) Joest Racing Opel	2:03.812	B	14
15	12	(Japan) Aguri Suzuki	Mercedes C-Class	(Germany) UPS Mercedes-AMG	2:03.999	B	15
16	24	(France) Yannick Dalmas	Opel Calibra V6 4x4	(Germany) Joest Racing Opel	2:04.104	B	16
17	44	(Germany) Hans-Joachim Stuck	Opel Calibra V6 4x4	(Germany) Team Rosberg Opel	2:04.285	B	17
18	8	(United Kingdom) Oliver Gavin	Opel Calibra V6 4x4	(Germany) Joest Racing Opel	2:04.292	B	18
19	17	(Germany) Klaus Ludwig	Opel Calibra V6 4x4	(Germany) Zakspeed Opel	2:04.293	B	19
20	10	(Germany) Michael Bartels	Alfa Romeo 155 V6 TI	(Italy) Jägermeister JAS Motorsport Alfa Romeo	2:05.559	B	20
21	25	(Japan) Masanori Sekiya	Opel Calibra V6 4x4	(Germany) Joest Racing Opel	2:05.621	B	21
22	21	(Germany) Alexander Grau	Mercedes C-Class	(Germany) Persson Motorsport	2:07.238	B	22
23	19	(Japan) Naoki Hattori	Alfa Romeo 155 V6 TI	(Italy) Bosch JAS Motorsport Alfa Romeo	2:07.345	B	23
24	22	(Germany) Ellen Lohr	Mercedes C-Class	(Germany) Persson Motorsport	2:08.052	B	24

=== Race 1 ===
Pos.	No.	Driver	Car	Team	Laps	Time/Retired	Grid	Points
1	2	(United Kingdom) Dario Franchitti	Mercedes C-Class	(Germany) D2 Mercedes-AMG	18	38:23.290	9	20
2	15	(Germany) Christian Danner	Alfa Romeo 155 V6 TI	(Italy) TV Spielfilm Alfa Corse	18	+2.338	1	15
3	1	(Germany) Bernd Schneider	Mercedes C-Class	(Germany) D2 Mercedes-AMG	18	+2.762	2	12
4	14	(Italy) Giancarlo Fisichella	Alfa Romeo 155 V6 TI	(Italy) TV Spielfilm Alfa Corse	18	+2.931	5	10
5	9	(Italy) Stefano Modena	Alfa Romeo 155 V6 TI	(Italy) JAS Motorsport Alfa Romeo	18	+3.421	3	8
6	5	(Italy) Nicola Larini	Alfa Romeo 155 V6 TI	(Italy) Martini Alfa Corse	18	+5.435	4	6
7	3	(Denmark) Jan Magnussen	Mercedes C-Class	(Germany) Warsteiner Mercedes-AMG	18	+5.886	10	4
8	4	(Germany) Bernd Mayländer	Mercedes C-Class	(Germany) Warsteiner Mercedes-AMG	18	+7.791	7	3
9	16	(Germany) Uwe Alzen	Opel Calibra V6 4x4	(Germany) Zakspeed Opel	18	+9.425	11	2
10	6	(Italy) Alessandro Nannini	Alfa Romeo 155 V6 TI	(Italy) Martini Alfa Corse	18	+14.777	6	1
11	12	(Japan) Aguri Suzuki	Mercedes C-Class	(Germany) UPS Mercedes-AMG	18	+15.025	15	
12	24	(France) Yannick Dalmas	Opel Calibra V6 4x4	(Germany) Joest Racing Opel	18	+17.687	16	
13	7	(Germany) Manuel Reuter	Opel Calibra V6 4x4	(Germany) Joest Racing Opel	18	+19.983	14	
14	11	(Germany) Jörg van Ommen	Mercedes C-Class	(Germany) UPS Mercedes-AMG	18	+28.408	13	
15	10	(Germany) Michael Bartels	Alfa Romeo 155 V6 TI	(Italy) Jägermeister JAS Motorsport Alfa Romeo	18	+36.562	20	
16	8	(United Kingdom) Oliver Gavin	Opel Calibra V6 4x4	(Germany) Joest Racing Opel	18	+46.870	18	
17	21	(Germany) Alexander Grau	Mercedes C-Class	(Germany) Persson Motorsport	18	+48.976	22	
18	44	(Germany) Hans-Joachim Stuck	Opel Calibra V6 4x4	(Germany) Team Rosberg Opel	18	+55.866	17	
19	19	(Japan) Naoki Hattori	Alfa Romeo 155 V6 TI	(Italy) Bosch JAS Motorsport Alfa Romeo	18	+57.536	23	
20	25	(Japan) Masanori Sekiya	Opel Calibra V6 4x4	(Germany) Joest Racing Opel	18	+59.677	21	
21	22	(Germany) Ellen Lohr	Mercedes C-Class	(Germany) Persson Motorsport	18	+1:00.671	24	
Ret	17	(Germany) Klaus Ludwig	Opel Calibra V6 4x4	(Germany) Zakspeed Opel	11	Retired	19	
Ret	43	(Finland) JJ Lehto	Opel Calibra V6 4x4	(Germany) Team Rosberg Opel	1	Retired	12	
DNS	18	(Italy) Gabriele Tarquini	Alfa Romeo 155 V6 TI	(Italy) JAS Motorsport Alfa Romeo		Did not start	8	

=== Race 2 ===
Pos.	No.	Driver	Car	Team	Laps	Time/Retired	Grid	Points
1	1	(Germany) Bernd Schneider	Mercedes C-Class	(Germany) D2 Mercedes-AMG	18	37:43.447	3	20
2	14	(Italy) Giancarlo Fisichella	Alfa Romeo 155 V6 TI	(Italy) TV Spielfilm Alfa Corse	18	+19.050	4	15
3	3	(Denmark) Jan Magnussen	Mercedes C-Class	(Germany) Warsteiner Mercedes-AMG	18	+19.597	7	12
4	9	(Italy) Stefano Modena	Alfa Romeo 155 V6 TI	(Italy) JAS Motorsport Alfa Romeo	18	+28.157	5	10
5	6	(Italy) Alessandro Nannini	Alfa Romeo 155 V6 TI	(Italy) Martini Alfa Corse	18	+28.227	10	8
6	5	(Italy) Nicola Larini	Alfa Romeo 155 V6 TI	(Italy) Martini Alfa Corse	18	+28.229	6	6
7	15	(Germany) Christian Danner	Alfa Romeo 155 V6 TI	(Italy) TV Spielfilm Alfa Corse	18	+36.023	2	4
8	43	(Finland) JJ Lehto	Opel Calibra V6 4x4	(Germany) Team Rosberg Opel	18	+37.878	23	3
9	24	(France) Yannick Dalmas	Opel Calibra V6 4x4	(Germany) Joest Racing Opel	18	+45.119	12	2
10	17	(Germany) Klaus Ludwig	Opel Calibra V6 4x4	(Germany) Zakspeed Opel	18	+45.497	22	1
11	8	(United Kingdom) Oliver Gavin	Opel Calibra V6 4x4	(Germany) Joest Racing Opel	18	+47.016	16	
12	16	(Germany) Uwe Alzen	Opel Calibra V6 4x4	(Germany) Zakspeed Opel	18	+56.026	9	
13	11	(Germany) Jörg van Ommen	Mercedes C-Class	(Germany) UPS Mercedes-AMG	18	+58.084	14	
14	7	(Germany) Manuel Reuter	Opel Calibra V6 4x4	(Germany) Joest Racing Opel	18	+1:05.602	13	
15	21	(Germany) Alexander Grau	Mercedes C-Class	(Germany) Persson Motorsport	18	+1:07.310	17	
16	19	(Japan) Naoki Hattori	Alfa Romeo 155 V6 TI	(Italy) Bosch JAS Motorsport Alfa Romeo	18	+1:15.812	19	
17	10	(Germany) Michael Bartels	Alfa Romeo 155 V6 TI	(Italy) Jägermeister JAS Motorsport Alfa Romeo	17	Retired	15	
18	44	(Germany) Hans-Joachim Stuck	Opel Calibra V6 4x4	(Germany) Team Rosberg Opel	16	Retired	18	
Ret	18	(Italy) Gabriele Tarquini	Alfa Romeo 155 V6 TI	(Italy) JAS Motorsport Alfa Romeo	9	Retired	24	
Ret	22	(Germany) Ellen Lohr	Mercedes C-Class	(Germany) Persson Motorsport	7	Retired	21	
Ret	2	(United Kingdom) Dario Franchitti	Mercedes C-Class	(Germany) D2 Mercedes-AMG	5	Retired	1	
Ret	4	(Germany) Bernd Mayländer	Mercedes C-Class	(Germany) Warsteiner Mercedes-AMG	2	Retired	8	
DNS	12	(Japan) Aguri Suzuki	Mercedes C-Class	(Germany) UPS Mercedes-AMG		Did not start	11	
DNS	25	(Japan) Masanori Sekiya	Opel Calibra V6 4x4	(Germany) Joest Racing Opel		Did not start	20	

== Standings after the event ==
Drivers' Championship standings

Pos	Driver	Points
1	(Germany) Manuel Reuter	218
2	(Germany) Bernd Schneider	205
3	(Italy) Alessandro Nannini	180
4	(United Kingdom) Dario Franchitti	171
5	(Finland) JJ Lehto	148

Manufacturers' Championship standings

Pos	Driver	Points
1	(Germany) Opel	349
2	(Italy) Alfa Romeo	340
3	(Germany) Mercedes	305

- Note: Only the top five positions are included for both sets of drivers' standings.
