= 1996 ITC Interlagos round =

(Brazil) 1996 ITC Interlagos round
Round details
- Round 12 of 13 rounds in the 1996 International Touring Car Championship
- Layout of the Autódromo José Carlos Pace
- Location: Autódromo José Carlos Pace, São Paulo, Brazil
- Course: Permanent racing facility 4.293 km (2.668 mi)

International Touring Car Championship

Race 1
- Date: 27 October 1996
- Laps: 24

Pole position
Driver	(Germany) Christian Danner	TV Spielfilm Alfa Corse
- Time: 1:32.631

Podium
First	(Italy) Alessandro Nannini	Martini Alfa Corse
Second	(Italy) Stefano Modena	JAS Motorsport Alfa Romeo
Third	(Germany) Christian Danner	TV Spielfilm Alfa Corse

Fastest lap
Driver	(Italy) Alessandro Nannini	Martini Alfa Corse
- Time: 1:35.014 (on lap 14)

Race 2
- Date: 27 October 1996
- Laps: 24

Podium
First	(Italy) Nicola Larini	Martini Alfa Corse
Second	(Brazil) Max Wilson	Bosch JAS Motorsport Alfa Romeo
Third	(Denmark) Jan Magnussen	Warsteiner Mercedes-AMG

Fastest lap
Driver	(Italy) Giancarlo Fisichella	JAS Motorsport Alfa Romeo
- Time: 1:41.832 (on lap 22)

The 1996 ITC Interlagos round was the twelfth round of the 1996 International Touring Car Championship season. It took place on 27 October at the Autódromo José Carlos Pace.

Alessandro Nannini won the first race, starting from pole position, and Nicola Larini gained the second one, both driving an Alfa Romeo 155 V6 TI.

== Classification ==
=== Qualifying ===
Pos.	No.	Driver	Car	Team	Time	Grid
1	15	(Germany) Christian Danner	Alfa Romeo 155 V6 TI	(Italy) TV Spielfilm Alfa Corse	1:32.631	1
2	43	(Finland) JJ Lehto	Opel Calibra V6 4x4	(Germany) Team Rosberg Opel	1:32.728	2
3	5	(Italy) Nicola Larini	Alfa Romeo 155 V6 TI	(Italy) Martini Alfa Corse	1:32.809	3
4	16	(Germany) Uwe Alzen	Opel Calibra V6 4x4	(Germany) Zakspeed Opel	1:32.814	4
5	6	(Italy) Alessandro Nannini	Alfa Romeo 155 V6 TI	(Italy) Martini Alfa Corse	1:32.950	5
6	8	(United Kingdom) Oliver Gavin	Opel Calibra V6 4x4	(Germany) Joest Racing Opel	1:33.257	6
7	17	(Germany) Klaus Ludwig	Opel Calibra V6 4x4	(Germany) Zakspeed Opel	1:33.304	7
8	14	(Italy) Giancarlo Fisichella	Alfa Romeo 155 V6 TI	(Italy) Martini Alfa Corse	1:33.404	8
9	9	(Italy) Stefano Modena	Alfa Romeo 155 V6 TI	(Italy) JAS Motorsport Alfa Romeo	1:33.438	9
10	18	(Italy) Gabriele Tarquini	Alfa Romeo 155 V6 TI	(Italy) JAS Motorsport Alfa Romeo	1:33.639	10
11	1	(Germany) Bernd Schneider	Mercedes C-Class	(Germany) D2 Mercedes-AMG	1:33.642	11
12	7	(Germany) Manuel Reuter	Opel Calibra V6 4x4	(Germany) Joest Racing Opel	1:33.652	12
13	44	(Germany) Hans-Joachim Stuck	Opel Calibra V6 4x4	(Germany) Team Rosberg Opel	1:33.702	13
14	2	(United Kingdom) Dario Franchitti	Mercedes C-Class	(Germany) D2 Mercedes-AMG	1:33.899	14
15	3	(Denmark) Jan Magnussen	Mercedes C-Class	(Germany) Warsteiner Mercedes-AMG	1:33.903	15
16	19	(Brazil) Max Wilson	Alfa Romeo 155 V6 TI	(Italy) Bosch JAS Motorsport Alfa Romeo	1:34.038	16
17	10	(Germany) Michael Bartels	Alfa Romeo 155 V6 TI	(Italy) Jägermeister JAS Motorsport Alfa Romeo	1:34.045	17
18	24	(France) Yannick Dalmas	Opel Calibra V6 4x4	(Germany) Joest Racing Opel	1:34.048	18
19	25	(Brazil) Tony Kanaan	Opel Calibra V6 4x4	(Germany) Joest Racing Opel	1:34.313	19
20	12	(Brazil) Christian Fittipaldi	Mercedes C-Class	(Germany) UPS Mercedes-AMG	1:34.377	20
21	4	(Germany) Bernd Mayländer	Mercedes C-Class	(Germany) Warsteiner Mercedes-AMG	1:34.387	21
22	11	(Germany) Jörg van Ommen	Mercedes C-Class	(Germany) UPS Mercedes-AMG	1:34.709	22
23	21	(Germany) Alexander Grau	Mercedes C-Class	(Germany) Persson Motorsport	1:35.416	23
24	22	(Germany) Ellen Lohr	Mercedes C-Class	(Germany) Persson Motorsport	1:36.116	24

=== Race 1 ===
Pos.	No.	Driver	Car	Team	Laps	Time/Retired	Grid	Points
1	6	(Italy) Alessandro Nannini	Alfa Romeo 155 V6 TI	(Italy) Martini Alfa Corse	24	39:29.973	5	20
2	9	(Italy) Stefano Modena	Alfa Romeo 155 V6 TI	(Italy) JAS Motorsport Alfa Romeo	24	+4.551	9	15
3	15	(Germany) Christian Danner	Alfa Romeo 155 V6 TI	(Italy) TV Spielfilm Alfa Corse	24	+5.199	1	12
4	7	(Germany) Manuel Reuter	Opel Calibra V6 4x4	(Germany) Joest Racing Opel	24	+13.805	12	10
5	1	(Germany) Bernd Schneider	Mercedes C-Class	(Germany) D2 Mercedes-AMG	24	+14.299	11	8
6	43	(Finland) JJ Lehto	Opel Calibra V6 4x4	(Germany) Team Rosberg Opel	24	+18.051	2	6
7	44	(Germany) Hans-Joachim Stuck	Opel Calibra V6 4x4	(Germany) Team Rosberg Opel	24	+24.056	13	4
8	24	(France) Yannick Dalmas	Opel Calibra V6 4x4	(Germany) Joest Racing Opel	24	+24.853	18	3
9	19	(Brazil) Max Wilson	Alfa Romeo 155 V6 TI	(Italy) Bosch JAS Motorsport Alfa Romeo	24	+30.642	16	2
10	12	(Brazil) Christian Fittipaldi	Mercedes C-Class	(Germany) UPS Mercedes-AMG	24	+40.777	20	1
11	8	(United Kingdom) Oliver Gavin	Opel Calibra V6 4x4	(Germany) Joest Racing Opel	24	+42.263	6	
12	14	(Italy) Giancarlo Fisichella	Alfa Romeo 155 V6 TI	(Italy) TV Spielfilm Alfa Corse	24	+45.242	8	
13	2	(United Kingdom) Dario Franchitti	Mercedes C-Class	(Germany) D2 Mercedes-AMG	24	+49.820	14	
14	3	(Denmark) Jan Magnussen	Mercedes C-Class	(Germany) Warsteiner Mercedes-AMG	24	+55.072	15	
15	11	(Germany) Jörg van Ommen	Mercedes C-Class	(Germany) UPS Mercedes-AMG	24	+1:03.282	22	
16	4	(Germany) Bernd Mayländer	Mercedes C-Class	(Germany) Warsteiner Mercedes-AMG	24	+1:08.751	21	
17	21	(Germany) Alexander Grau	Mercedes C-Class	(Germany) Persson Motorsport	24	+1:31.051	23	
18	22	(Germany) Ellen Lohr	Mercedes C-Class	(Germany) Persson Motorsport	22	Retired	24	
Ret	25	(Brazil) Tony Kanaan	Opel Calibra V6 4x4	(Germany) Joest Racing Opel	21	Retired	19	
Ret	17	(Germany) Klaus Ludwig	Opel Calibra V6 4x4	(Germany) Zakspeed Opel	11	Retired	7	
Ret	10	(Germany) Michael Bartels	Alfa Romeo 155 V6 TI	(Italy) Jägermeister JAS Motorsport Alfa Romeo	5	Retired	17	
Ret	16	(Germany) Uwe Alzen	Opel Calibra V6 4x4	(Germany) Zakspeed Opel	1	Retired	4	
Ret	18	(Italy) Gabriele Tarquini	Alfa Romeo 155 V6 TI	(Italy) JAS Motorsport Alfa Romeo	1	Retired	10	
Ret	5	(Italy) Nicola Larini	Alfa Romeo 155 V6 TI	(Italy) Martini Alfa Corse	0	Retired	3	

=== Race 2 ===
Pos.	No.	Driver	Car	Team	Laps	Time/Retired	Grid	Points
1	5	(Italy) Nicola Larini	Alfa Romeo 155 V6 TI	(Italy) Martini Alfa Corse	24	43:26.991	22	20
2	19	(Brazil) Max Wilson	Alfa Romeo 155 V6 TI	(Italy) Bosch JAS Motorsport Alfa Romeo	24	+6.090	9	15
3	3	(Denmark) Jan Magnussen	Mercedes C-Class	(Germany) Warsteiner Mercedes-AMG	24	+6.176	14	12
4	7	(Germany) Manuel Reuter	Opel Calibra V6 4x4	(Germany) Joest Racing Opel	24	+26.488	4	10
5	6	(Italy) Alessandro Nannini	Alfa Romeo 155 V6 TI	(Italy) Martini Alfa Corse	24	+37.238	1	8
6	11	(Germany) Jörg van Ommen	Mercedes C-Class	(Germany) UPS Mercedes-AMG	24	+46.721	15	6
7	4	(Germany) Bernd Mayländer	Mercedes C-Class	(Germany) Warsteiner Mercedes-AMG	24	+48.392	16	4
8	9	(Italy) Stefano Modena	Alfa Romeo 155 V6 TI	(Italy) JAS Motorsport Alfa Romeo	24	+1:01.648	2	3
9	43	(Finland) JJ Lehto	Opel Calibra V6 4x4	(Germany) Team Rosberg Opel	24	+1:24.267	6	2
10	2	(United Kingdom) Dario Franchitti	Mercedes C-Class	(Germany) D2 Mercedes-AMG	24	+1:26.633	13	1
11	24	(France) Yannick Dalmas	Opel Calibra V6 4x4	(Germany) Joest Racing Opel	24	+1:30.628	8	
12	21	(Germany) Alexander Grau	Mercedes C-Class	(Germany) Persson Motorsport	24	+1:37.656	17	
13	22	(Germany) Ellen Lohr	Mercedes C-Class	(Germany) Persson Motorsport	23	+1 lap	18	
14	1	(Germany) Bernd Schneider	Mercedes C-Class	(Germany) D2 Mercedes-AMG	23	+1 lap	5	
15	8	(United Kingdom) Oliver Gavin	Opel Calibra V6 4x4	(Germany) Joest Racing Opel	23	+1 lap	11	
16	14	(Italy) Giancarlo Fisichella	Alfa Romeo 155 V6 TI	(Italy) TV Spielfilm Alfa Corse	22	+2 laps	12	
17	10	(Germany) Michael Bartels	Alfa Romeo 155 V6 TI	(Italy) Jägermeister JAS Motorsport Alfa Romeo	21	+3 laps	21	
Ret	25	(Brazil) Tony Kanaan	Opel Calibra V6 4x4	(Germany) Joest Racing Opel	20	Retired	19	
Ret	15	(Germany) Christian Danner	Alfa Romeo 155 V6 TI	(Italy) TV Spielfilm Alfa Corse	17	Retired	3	
Ret	44	(Germany) Hans-Joachim Stuck	Opel Calibra V6 4x4	(Germany) Team Rosberg Opel	17	Retired	7	
Ret	12	(Brazil) Christian Fittipaldi	Mercedes C-Class	(Germany) UPS Mercedes-AMG	9	Retired	10	
Ret	17	(Germany) Klaus Ludwig	Opel Calibra V6 4x4	(Germany) Zakspeed Opel	8	Retired	20	
DNS	16	(Germany) Uwe Alzen	Opel Calibra V6 4x4	(Germany) Zakspeed Opel		Did not start	23	
DNS	18	(Italy) Gabriele Tarquini	Alfa Romeo 155 V6 TI	(Italy) JAS Motorsport Alfa Romeo		Did not start		

== Standings after the event ==
Drivers' Championship standings

	Pos	Driver	Points
	1	(Germany) Manuel Reuter	218
	2	(Germany) Bernd Schneider	173
1	3	(Italy) Alessandro Nannini	171
1	4	(United Kingdom) Dario Franchitti	151
	5	(Finland) JJ Lehto	145

Manufacturers' Championship standings

Pos	Driver	Points
1	(Germany) Opel	344
2	(Italy) Alfa Romeo	310
3	(Germany) Mercedes	265

- Note: Only the top five positions are included for both sets of drivers' standings.
