= 1996 ITC Hockenheim-1 round =

(Germany) 1996 ITC Hockenheim-1 round
Round details
- Round 1 of 13 rounds in the 1996 International Touring Car Championship
- Layout of the Hockenheimring
- Location: Hockenheimring, Hockenheim, Germany
- Course: Permanent racing facility 2.638 km (1.639 mi)

International Touring Car Championship

Race 1
- Date: 14 April 1996
- Laps: 38

Pole position
Driver	(Italy) Nicola Larini	Martini Alfa Corse
- Time: 1:00.133

Podium
First	(Germany) Manuel Reuter	Joest Racing Opel
Second	(Denmark) Jan Magnussen	Warsteiner Mercedes-AMG
Third	(United Kingdom) Dario Franchitti	D2 Mercedes-AMG

Fastest lap
Driver	(Italy) Alessandro Nannini	Martini Alfa Corse
- Time: 1:01.780 (on lap 3)

Race 2
- Date: 14 April 1996
- Laps: 38

Podium
First	(Denmark) Jan Magnussen	Warsteiner Mercedes-AMG
Second	(Germany) Bernd Schneider	D2 Mercedes-AMG
Third	(Germany) Manuel Reuter	Joest Racing Opel

Fastest lap
Driver	(Denmark) Jan Magnussen	Warsteiner Mercedes-AMG
- Time: 1:01.417 (on lap 2)

The 1996 ITC Hockenheim-1 round was the first round of the 1996 International Touring Car Championship season. It took place on 14 April at the Hockenheimring.

Manuel Reuter won the first race, starting from fourth position, driving an Opel Calibra V6 4x4, and Jan Magnussen gained the second one, driving a Mercedes C-Class.

== Classification ==
=== Qualifying ===
Pos.	No.	Driver	Car	Team	Time	Group	Grid
1	5	(Italy) Nicola Larini	Alfa Romeo 155 V6 TI	(Italy) Martini Alfa Corse	1:00.133	A	1
2	6	(Italy) Alessandro Nannini	Alfa Romeo 155 V6 TI	(Italy) Martini Alfa Corse	1:00.134	A	2
3	14	(Italy) Giancarlo Fisichella	Alfa Romeo 155 V6 TI	(Italy) TV Spielfilm Alfa Corse	1:00.725	A	3
4	7	(Germany) Manuel Reuter	Opel Calibra V6 4x4	(Germany) Joest Racing Opel	1:00.755	A	4
5	3	(Denmark) Jan Magnussen	Mercedes C-Class	(Germany) Warsteiner Mercedes-AMG	1:00.775	A	5
6	15	(Germany) Christian Danner	Alfa Romeo 155 V6 TI	(Italy) TV Spielfilm Alfa Corse	1:00.966	A	6
7	1	(Germany) Bernd Schneider	Mercedes C-Class	(Germany) D2 Mercedes-AMG	1:01.000	A	7
8	44	(Germany) Hans-Joachim Stuck	Opel Calibra V6 4x4	(Germany) Team Rosberg Opel	1:01.302	A	8
9	17	(Germany) Klaus Ludwig	Opel Calibra V6 4x4	(Germany) Zakspeed Opel	1:01.360	A	9
10	24	(France) Yannick Dalmas	Opel Calibra V6 4x4	(Germany) Joest Racing Opel	1:01.492	A	10
11	2	(United Kingdom) Dario Franchitti	Mercedes C-Class	(Germany) D2 Mercedes-AMG	1:00.889	B	11
12	11	(Germany) Jörg van Ommen	Mercedes C-Class	(Germany) UPS Mercedes-AMG	1:01.052	B	12
13	43	(Finland) JJ Lehto	Opel Calibra V6 4x4	(Germany) Team Rosberg Opel	1:01.127	B	13
14	10	(Germany) Michael Bartels	Alfa Romeo 155 V6 TI	(Italy) Jägermeister JAS Motorsport Alfa Romeo	1:01.189	B	14
15	9	(Italy) Stefano Modena	Alfa Romeo 155 V6 TI	(Italy) JAS Motorsport Alfa Romeo	1:01.482	B	15
16	16	(Germany) Uwe Alzen	Opel Calibra V6 4x4	(Germany) Zakspeed Opel	1:01.559	B	16
17	18	(Italy) Gabriele Tarquini	Alfa Romeo 155 V6 TI	(Italy) JAS Motorsport Alfa Romeo	1:01.912	B	17
18	4	(Germany) Alexander Grau	Mercedes C-Class	(Germany) Warsteiner Mercedes-AMG	1:02.045	B	18
19	22	(Germany) Bernd Mayländer	Mercedes C-Class	(Germany) Persson Motorsport	1:02.177	B	19
20	8	(United Kingdom) Oliver Gavin	Opel Calibra V6 4x4	(Germany) Joest Racing Opel	1:02.387	B	20
21	21	(Germany) Ellen Lohr	Mercedes C-Class	(Germany) Persson Motorsport	1:02.477	B	21
22	25	(Austria) Alexander Wurz	Opel Calibra V6 4x4	(Germany) Joest Racing Opel	1:03.263	B	22
23	13	(Italy) Gianni Giudici	Alfa Romeo 155 V6 TI	(Italy) Giudici Motorsport	1:04.660	B	23
24	12	(Denmark) Kurt Thiim	Mercedes C-Class	(Germany) UPS Mercedes-AMG	no time	B	24
25	19	(Denmark) Jason Watt	Alfa Romeo 155 V6 TI	(Italy) Bosch JAS Motorsport Alfa Romeo	no time	B	25

=== Race 1 ===
Pos.	No.	Driver	Car	Team	Laps	Time/Retired	Grid	Points
1	7	(Germany) Manuel Reuter	Opel Calibra V6 4x4	(Germany) Joest Racing Opel	38	40:19.433	4	20
2	3	(Denmark) Jan Magnussen	Mercedes C-Class	(Germany) Warsteiner Mercedes-AMG	38	+0.709	5	15
3	2	(United Kingdom) Dario Franchitti	Mercedes C-Class	(Germany) D2 Mercedes-AMG	38	+6.579	11	12
4	1	(Germany) Bernd Schneider	Mercedes C-Class	(Germany) D2 Mercedes-AMG	38	+7.707	7	10
5	44	(Germany) Hans-Joachim Stuck	Opel Calibra V6 4x4	(Germany) Team Rosberg Opel	38	+19.042	8	8
6	4	(Germany) Alexander Grau	Mercedes C-Class	(Germany) Warsteiner Mercedes-AMG	38	+19.458	18	6
7	14	(Italy) Giancarlo Fisichella	Alfa Romeo 155 V6 TI	(Italy) TV Spielfilm Alfa Corse	38	+36.238	3	4
8	16	(Germany) Uwe Alzen	Opel Calibra V6 4x4	(Germany) Zakspeed Opel	38	+42.486	16	3
9	21	(Germany) Ellen Lohr	Mercedes C-Class	(Germany) Persson Motorsport	38	+44.401	21	2
10	6	(Italy) Alessandro Nannini	Alfa Romeo 155 V6 TI	(Italy) Martini Alfa Corse	38	+46.309	2	1
11	5	(Italy) Nicola Larini	Alfa Romeo 155 V6 TI	(Italy) Martini Alfa Corse	38	+47.848	1	
12	12	(Denmark) Kurt Thiim	Mercedes C-Class	(Germany) UPS Mercedes-AMG	38	+1:01.190	24	
13	15	(Germany) Christian Danner	Alfa Romeo 155 V6 TI	(Italy) TV Spielfilm Alfa Corse	37	+1 lap	6	
14	10	(Germany) Michael Bartels	Alfa Romeo 155 V6 TI	(Italy) Jägermeiser JAS Motorsport Alfa Romeo	37	+1 lap	14	
15	43	(Finland) JJ Lehto	Opel Calibra V6 4x4	(Germany) Team Rosberg Opel	37	+1 lap	13	
Ret	17	(Germany) Klaus Ludwig	Opel Calibra V6 4x4	(Germany) Zakspeed Opel	31	Retired	9	
Ret	8	(United Kingdom) Oliver Gavin	Opel Calibra V6 4x4	(Germany) Joest Racing Opel	22	Retired	20	
Ret	18	(Italy) Gabriele Tarquini	Alfa Romeo 155 V6 TI	(Italy) JAS Motorsport Alfa Romeo	19	Retired	17	
Ret	25	(Austria) Alexander Wurz	Opel Calibra V6 4x4	(Germany) Joest Racing Opel	19	Retired	22	
Ret	11	(Germany) Jörg van Ommen	Mercedes C-Class	(Germany) UPS Mercedes-AMG	19	Retired	12	
Ret	24	(France) Yannick Dalmas	Opel Calibra V6 4x4	(Germany) Joest Racing Opel	12	Retired	10	
Ret	22	(Germany) Bernd Mayländer	Mercedes C-Class	(Germany) Persson Motorsport	11	Retired	19	
Ret	13	(Italy) Gianni Giudici	Alfa Romeo 155 V6 TI	(Italy) Giudici Motorsport	9	Retired	23	
Ret	19	(Denmark) Jason Watt	Alfa Romeo 155 V6 TI	(Italy) Bosch JAS Motorsport Alfa Romeo	8	Retired	25	
Ret	9	(Italy) Stefano Modena	Alfa Romeo 155 V6 TI	(Italy) JAS Motorsport Alfa Romeo	3	Retired	15	

=== Race 2 ===
Pos.	No.	Driver	Car	Team	Laps	Time/Retired	Grid	Points
1	3	(Denmark) Jan Magnussen	Mercedes C-Class	(Germany) Warsteiner Mercedes-AMG	38	39:53.165	2	20
2	1	(Germany) Bernd Schneider	Mercedes C-Class	(Germany) D2 Mercedes-AMG	38	+1.588	4	15
3	7	(Germany) Manuel Reuter	Opel Calibra V6 4x4	(Germany) Joest Racing Opel	38	+10.674	1	12
4	2	(United Kingdom) Dario Franchitti	Mercedes C-Class	(Germany) D2 Mercedes-AMG	38	+11.028	3	10
5	4	(Germany) Alexander Grau	Mercedes C-Class	(Germany) Warsteiner Mercedes-AMG	38	+16.465	6	8
6	16	(Germany) Uwe Alzen	Opel Calibra V6 4x4	(Germany) Zakspeed Opel	38	+16.924	8	6
7	44	(Germany) Hans-Joachim Stuck	Opel Calibra V6 4x4	(Germany) Team Rosberg Opel	38	+34.193	5	4
8	12	(Denmark) Kurt Thiim	Mercedes C-Class	(Germany) UPS Mercedes-AMG	38	+42.206	12	3
9	11	(Germany) Jörg van Ommen	Mercedes C-Class	(Germany) UPS Mercedes-AMG	38	+44.782	20	2
10	14	(Italy) Giancarlo Fisichella	Alfa Romeo 155 V6 TI	(Italy) TV Spielfilm Alfa Corse	38	+49.670	7	1
11	24	(France) Yannick Dalmas	Opel Calibra V6 4x4	(Germany) Joest Racing Opel	38	+49.877	21	
12	5	(Italy) Nicola Larini	Alfa Romeo 155 V6 TI	(Italy) Martini Alfa Corse	38	+1:05.023	11	
13	6	(Italy) Alessandro Nannini	Alfa Romeo 155 V6 TI	(Italy) Martini Alfa Corse	37	+1 lap	10	
14	10	(Germany) Michael Bartels	Alfa Romeo 155 V6 TI	(Italy) TV Spielfilm Alfa Corse	37	+1 lap	14	
15	13	(Italy) Gianni Giudici	Alfa Romeo 155 V6 TI	(Italy) Giudici Motorsport	35	+3 laps	23	
Ret	25	(Austria) Alexander Wurz	Opel Calibra V6 4x4	(Germany) Joest Racing Opel	32	Retired	19	
Ret	21	(Germany) Ellen Lohr	Mercedes C-Class	(Germany) Persson Motorsport	19	Retired	9	
Ret	43	(Finland) JJ Lehto	Opel Calibra V6 4x4	(Germany) Team Rosberg Opel	16	Retired	15	
Ret	22	(Germany) Bernd Mayländer	Mercedes C-Class	(Germany) Persson Motorsport	8	Retired	22	
Ret	19	(Denmark) Jason Watt	Alfa Romeo 155 V6 TI	(Italy) Bosch JAS Motorsport Alfa Romeo	8	Retired	24	
Ret	15	(Germany) Christian Danner	Alfa Romeo 155 V6 TI	(Italy) TV Spielfilm Alfa Corse	3	Retired	13	
DNS	17	(Germany) Klaus Ludwig	Opel Calibra V6 4x4	(Germany) Zakspeed Opel		Did not start	16	
DNS	8	(United Kingdom) Oliver Gavin	Opel Calibra V6 4x4	(Germany) Joest Racing Opel		Did not start	17	
DNS	18	(Italy) Gabriele Tarquini	Alfa Romeo 155 V6 TI	(Italy) JAS Motorsport Alfa Romeo		Did not start	18	
DNS	9	(Italy) Stefano Modena	Alfa Romeo 155 V6 TI	(Italy) JAS Motorsport Alfa Romeo		Did not start	25	

== Standings after the event ==
Drivers' Championship standings

Pos	Driver	Points
1	(Denmark) Jan Magnussen	35
2	(Germany) Manuel Reuter	32
3	(Germany) Bernd Schneider	25
4	(United Kingdom) Dario Franchitti	22
5	(Germany) Alexander Grau	14

Manufacturers' Championship standings

Pos	Driver	Points
1	(Germany) Mercedes	35
2	(Germany) Opel	32
3	(Italy) Alfa Romeo	5

- Note: Only the top five positions are included for both sets of drivers' standings.
