= 1996 ITC Nürburgring-1 round =

(Germany) 1996 ITC Nürburgring-1 round
Round details
- Round 2 of 13 rounds in the 1996 International Touring Car Championship
- Layout of the Nürburgring
- Location: Nürburgring, Nürburg, Germany
- Course: Permanent racing facility 4.556 km (2.831 mi)

International Touring Car Championship

Race 1
- Date: 12 May 1996
- Laps: 22

Pole position
Driver	(Germany) Jörg van Ommen	UPS Mercedes-AMG
- Time: 1:37.720

Podium
First	(Germany) Jörg van Ommen	UPS Mercedes-AMG
Second	(United Kingdom) Dario Franchitti	D2 Mercedes-AMG
Third	(Germany) Manuel Reuter	Joest Racing Opel

Fastest lap
Driver	(United Kingdom) Dario Franchitti	D2 Mercedes-AMG
- Time: 1:39.682 (on lap 5)

Race 2
- Date: 12 May 1996
- Laps: 22

Podium
First	(Germany) Manuel Reuter	Joest Racing Opel
Second	(Finland) JJ Lehto	Team Rosberg Opel
Third	(Denmark) Jan Magnussen	Warsteiner Mercedes-AMG

Fastest lap
Driver	(Germany) Jörg van Ommen	UPS Mercedes-AMG
- Time: 1:39.947

The 1996 ITC Nürburgring-1 round was the second round of the 1996 International Touring Car Championship season. It took place on 12 May at the Nürburgring.

Jörg van Ommen won the first race, starting from pole position, driving a Mercedes C-Class, and Manuel Reuter gained the second one, driving an Opel Calibra V6 4x4.

== Classification ==
=== Qualifying ===
Pos.	No.	Driver	Car	Team	Time	Group	Grid
1	11	(Germany) Jörg van Ommen	Mercedes C-Class	(Germany) UPS Mercedes-AMG	1:37:720	A	1
2	6	(Italy) Alessandro Nannini	Alfa Romeo 155 V6 TI	(Italy) Martini Alfa Corse	1:37.817	A	EX^{1}
3	2	(United Kingdom) Dario Franchitti	Mercedes C-Class	(Germany) D2 Mercedes-AMG	1:37.945	A	2
4	43	(Finland) JJ Lehto	Opel Calibra V6 4x4	(Germany) Team Rosberg Opel	1:38.221	A	3
5	1	(Germany) Bernd Schneider	Mercedes C-Class	(Germany) D2 Mercedes-AMG	1:38.326	A	4
6	14	(Italy) Giancarlo Fisichella	Alfa Romeo 155 V6 TI	(Italy) TV Spielfilm Alfa Corse	1:38.416	A	EX^{1}
7	15	(Germany) Christian Danner	Alfa Romeo 155 V6 TI	(Italy) TV Spielfilm Alfa Corse	1:38.934	A	5
8	7	(Germany) Manuel Reuter	Opel Calibra V6 4x4	(Germany) Joest Racing Opel	1:38.934	A	6
9	44	(Germany) Hans-Joachim Stuck	Opel Calibra V6 4x4	(Germany) Team Rosberg Opel	1:39.280	A	7
10	3	(Denmark) Jan Magnussen	Mercedes C-Class	(Germany) Warsteiner Mercedes-AMG	1:39.338	A	8
11	8	(United Kingdom) Oliver Gavin	Opel Calibra V6 4x4	(Germany) Joest Racing Opel	1:38.474	B	9
12	5	(Italy) Nicola Larini	Alfa Romeo 155 V6 TI	(Italy) Martini Alfa Corse	1:38.660	B	10
13	12	(Denmark) Kurt Thiim	Mercedes C-Class	(Germany) UPS Mercedes-AMG	1:38.788	B	11
14	18	(Italy) Gabriele Tarquini	Alfa Romeo 155 V6 TI	(Italy) JAS Motorsport Alfa Romeo	1:39.056	B	12
15	16	(Germany) Uwe Alzen	Opel Calibra V6 4x4	(Germany) Zakspeed Opel	1:39.151	B	13
16	25	(Austria) Alexander Wurz	Opel Calibra V6 4x4	(Germany) Joest Racing Opel	1:39.220	B	14
17	19	(Denmark) Jason Watt	Alfa Romeo 155 V6 TI	(Italy) Bosch JAS Motorsport Alfa Romeo	1:39.226	B	15
18	9	(Italy) Stefano Modena	Alfa Romeo 155 V6 TI	(Italy) JAS Motorsport Alfa Romeo	1:39.282	B	16
19	4	(Germany) Alexander Grau	Mercedes C-Class	(Germany) Warsteiner Mercedes-AMG	1:39.431	B	17
20	10	(Germany) Michael Bartels	Alfa Romeo 155 V6 TI	(Italy) Jägermeister JAS Motorsport Alfa Romeo	1:39.435	B	18
21	17	(Germany) Klaus Ludwig	Opel Calibra V6 4x4	(Germany) Zakspeed Opel	1:39.589	B	19
22	24	(France) Yannick Dalmas	Opel Calibra V6 4x4	(Germany) Joest Racing Opel	1:39.723	B	20
23	22	(Germany) Bernd Mayländer	Mercedes C-Class	(Germany) Persson Motorsport	1:39.756	B	21
24	13	(Italy) Gianni Giudici	Alfa Romeo 155 V6 TI	(Italy) Giudici Motorsport	1:43.439	B	22
25	21	(Germany) Ellen Lohr	Mercedes C-Class	(Germany) Persson Motorsport	1:44.008	B	23

Notes:

- ^1 – Alessandro Nannini and Giancarlo Fisichella were excluded from the event for using illegal fuel.

=== Race 1 ===
Pos.	No.	Driver	Car	Team	Laps	Time/Retired	Grid	Points
1	11	(Germany) Jörg van Ommen	Mercedes C-Class	(Germany) UPS Mercedes-AMG	22	37:12.332	1	20
2	2	(United Kingdom) Dario Franchitti	Mercedes C-Class	(Germany) D2 Mercedes-AMG	22	+2.317	2	15
3	7	(Germany) Manuel Reuter	Opel Calibra V6 4x4	(Germany) Joest Racing Opel	22	+12.500	6	12
4	1	(Germany) Bernd Schneider	Mercedes C-Class	(Germany) D2 Mercedes-AMG	22	+13.580	4	10
5	43	(Finland) JJ Lehto	Opel Calibra V6 4x4	(Germany) Team Rosberg Opel	22	+15.220	3	8
6	44	(Germany) Hans-Joachim Stuck	Opel Calibra V6 4x4	(Germany) Team Rosberg Opel	22	+16.335	7	6
7	3	(Denmark) Jan Magnussen	Mercedes C-Class	(Germany) Warsteiner Mercedes-AMG	22	+16.458	8	4
8	12	(Denmark) Kurt Thiim	Mercedes C-Class	(Germany) UPS Mercedes-AMG	22	+17.365	11	3
9	15	(Germany) Christian Danner	Alfa Romeo 155 V6 TI	(Italy) TV Spielfilm Alfa Corse	22	+24.485	5	2
10	18	(Italy) Gabriele Tarquini	Alfa Romeo 155 V6 TI	(Italy) JAS Motorsport Alfa Romeo	22	+30.363	12	1
11	10	(Germany) Michael Bartels	Alfa Romeo 155 V6 TI	(Italy) Jägermeister JAS Motorsport Alfa Romeo	22	+33.980	1	
12	25	(Austria) Alexander Wurz	Opel Calibra V6 4x4	(Germany) Joest Racing Opel	22	+34.981	14	
13	19	(Denmark) Jason Watt	Alfa Romeo 155 V6 TI	(Italy) JAS Motorsport Alfa Romeo	22	+40.753	15	
14	8	(United Kingdom) Oliver Gavin	Opel Calibra V6 4x4	(Germany) Joest Racing Opel	22	+43.757	9	
15	21	(Germany) Ellen Lohr	Mercedes C-Class	(Germany) Persson Motorsport	22	+46.000	23	
16	22	(Germany) Bernd Mayländer	Mercedes C-Class	(Germany) Persson Motorsport	22	+46.161	21	
17	9	(Italy) Stefano Modena	Alfa Romeo 155 V6 TI	(Italy) JAS Motorsport Alfa Romeo	22	+59.296	16	
18	16	(Germany) Uwe Alzen	Opel Calibra V6 4x4	(Germany) Zakspeed Opel	22	+1:34.174	13	
Ret	24	(France) Yannick Dalmas	Opel Calibra V6 4x4	(Germany) Joest Racing Opel	11	Retired	20	
Ret	5	(Italy) Nicola Larini	Alfa Romeo 155 V6 TI	(Italy) Martini Alfa Corse	1	Retired	10	
Ret	4	(Germany) Alexander Grau	Mercedes C-Class	(Germany) Warsteiner Mercedes-AMG	1	Retired	17	
Ret	17	(Germany) Klaus Ludwig	Opel Calibra V6 4x4	(Germany) Zakspeed Opel	1	Retired	19	
Ret	13	(Italy) Gianni Giudici	Alfa Romeo 155 V6 TI	(Italy) Giudici Motorsport	1	Retired	22	
EX	6	(Italy) Alessandro Nannini	Alfa Romeo 155 V6 TI	(Italy) Martini Alfa Corse		Excluded		
EX	14	(Italy) Giancarlo Fisichella	Alfa Romeo 155 V6 TI	(Italy) TV Spielfilm Alfa Corse		Excluded		

=== Race 2 ===
Pos.	No.	Driver	Car	Team	Laps	Time/Retired	Grid	Points
1	7	(Germany) Manuel Reuter	Opel Calibra V6 4x4	(Germany) Joest Racing Opel	22	37:30.118	3	20
2	43	(Finland) JJ Lehto	Opel Calibra V6 4x4	(Germany) Team Rosberg Opel	22	+2.257	5	15
3	3	(Denmark) Jan Magnussen	Mercedes C-Class	(Germany) Warsteiner Mercedes-AMG	22	+7.099	7	12
4	16	(Germany) Uwe Alzen	Opel Calibra V6 4x4	(Germany) Zakspeed Opel	22	+15.023	18	10
5	18	(Italy) Gabriele Tarquini	Alfa Romeo 155 V6 TI	(Italy) JAS Motorsport Alfa Romeo	22	+15.256	10	8
6	1	(Germany) Bernd Schneider	Mercedes C-Class	(Germany) D2 Mercedes-AMG	22	+15.823	4	6
7	5	(Italy) Nicola Larini	Alfa Romeo 155 V6 TI	(Italy) Martini Alfa Corse	22	+16.168	20	4
8	2	(United Kingdom) Dario Franchitti	Mercedes C-Class	(Germany) D2 Mercedes-AMG	22	+19.740	2	3
9	19	(Denmark) Jason Watt	Alfa Romeo 155 V6 TI	(Italy) Bosch JAS Motorsport Alfa Romeo	22	+27.398	13	2
10	15	(Germany) Christian Danner	Alfa Romeo 155 V6 TI	(Italy) TV Spielfilm Alfa Corse	22	+32.485	9	1
11	21	(Germany) Ellen Lohr	Mercedes C-Class	(Germany) Persson Motorsport	22	+43.504	15	
12	12	(Denmark) Kurt Thiim	Mercedes C-Class	(Germany) UPS Mercedes-AMG	19	+2 laps	8	
13	11	(Germany) Jörg van Ommen	Mercedes C-Class	(Germany) UPS Mercedes-AMG	18	Retired	1	
14	44	(Germany) Hans-Joachim Stuck	Opel Calibra V6 4x4	(Germany) Team Rosberg Opel	17	Retired	6	
Ret	10	(Germany) Michael Bartels	Alfa Romeo 155 V6 TI	(Italy) Jägermeister JAS Motorsport Alfa Romeo	10	Retired	11	
Ret	22	(Germany) Bernd Mayländer	Mercedes C-Class	(Germany) Persson Motorsport	9	Retired	16	
Ret	8	(United Kingdom) Oliver Gavin	Opel Calibra V6 4x4	(Germany) Joest Racing Opel	5	Retired	14	
Ret	17	(Germany) Klaus Ludwig	Opel Calibra V6 4x4	(Germany) Zakspeed Opel	4	Retired	22	
Ret	9	(Italy) Stefano Modena	Alfa Romeo 155 V6 TI	(Italy) JAS Motorsport Alfa Romeo	1	Retired	17	
DSQ	25	(Austria) Alexander Wurz	Opel Calibra V6 4x4	(Germany) Joest Racing Opel	9	Retired^{2}	12	
DNS	24	(France) Yannick Dalmas	Opel Calibra V6 4x4	(Germany) Joest Racing Opel		Did not start	19	
DNS	4	(Germany) Alexander Grau	Mercedes C-Class	(Germany) Warsteiner Mercedes-AMG		Did not start	21	
DNS	13	(Italy) Gianni Giudici	Alfa Romeo 155 V6 TI	(Italy) Giudici Motorsport		Did not start	23	
EX	6	(Italy) Alessandro Nannini	Alfa Romeo 155 V6 TI	(Italy) Martini Alfa Corse		Excluded		
EX	14	(Italy) Giancarlo Fisichella	Alfa Romeo 155 V6 TI	(Italy) TV Spielfilm Alfa Corse		Excluded		

Notes:

- ^2 – Alexander Wurz was disqualified because his team worked on the car during a stop-and-go penalty given for causing an accident with Oliver Gavin.

== Standings after the event ==
Drivers' Championship standings

	Pos	Driver	Points
1	1	(Germany) Manuel Reuter	64
1	2	(Denmark) Jan Magnussen	51
	3	(Germany) Bernd Schneider	41
	4	(United Kingdom) Dario Franchitti	40
	5	(Finland) JJ Lehto	23

Manufacturers' Championship standings

Pos	Driver	Points
1	(Germany) Mercedes	67
2	(Germany) Opel	64
3	(Italy) Alfa Romeo	15

- Note: Only the top five positions are included for both sets of drivers' standings.
