= 1996 ITC Norisring round =

International motor racing meeting

(Germany) 1996 ITC Norisring round
Round details
- Round 5 of 13 rounds in the 1996 International Touring Car Championship
- Layout of the Norisring
- Location: Norisring, Nuremberg, Germany
- Course: Permanent racing facility 2.300 km (1.429 mi)

International Touring Car Championship

Race 1
- Date: 23 June 1996
- Laps: 44

Pole position
Driver	(Germany) Uwe Alzen	Zakspeed Opel
- Time: 55.685

Podium
First	(Germany) Klaus Ludwig	Zakspeed Opel
Second	(Germany) Uwe Alzen	Zakspeed Opel
Third	(Italy) Stefano Modena	JAS Motorsport Alfa Romeo

Fastest lap
Driver	(Germany) Uwe Alzen	Zakspeed Opel
- Time: 50.397 (on lap 41)

Race 2
- Date: 23 June 1996
- Laps: 44

Podium
First	(Germany) Klaus Ludwig	Zakspeed Opel
Second	(Germany) Uwe Alzen	Zakspeed Opel
Third	(Finland) JJ Lehto	Team Rosberg Opel

Fastest lap
Driver	(Germany) Uwe Alzen	Zakspeed Opel
- Time: 49.686 (on lap 20)

The 1996 ITC Norisring round was the fifth round of the 1996 International Touring Car Championship season. It took place on 23 June at the Norisring.

Klaus Ludwig won both races, driving an Opel Calibra V6 4x4.

== Classification ==
=== Qualifying ===
Pos.	No.	Driver	Car	Team	Time	Group	Grid
1	16	(Germany) Uwe Alzen	Opel Calibra V6 4x4	(Germany) Zakspeed Opel	55.685	A	1
2	17	(Germany) Klaus Ludwig	Opel Calibra V6 4x4	(Germany) Zakspeed Opel	55.719	A	2
3	7	(Germany) Manuel Reuter	Opel Calibra V6 4x4	(Germany) Joest Racing Opel	56.578	A	3
4	9	(Italy) Stefano Modena	Alfa Romeo 155 V6 TI	(Italy) JAS Motorsport Alfa Romeo	56.878	A	4
5	43	(Finland) JJ Lehto	Opel Calibra V6 4x4	(Germany) Team Rosberg Opel	56.980	A	5
6	14	(Italy) Giancarlo Fisichella	Alfa Romeo 155 V6 TI	(Italy) TV Spielfilm Alfa Corse	57.017	A	6
7	1	(Germany) Bernd Schneider	Mercedes C-Class	(Germany) D2 Mercedes-AMG	57.628	A	7
8	3	(Denmark) Jan Magnussen	Mercedes C-Class	(Germany) Warsteiner Mercedes-AMG	57.812	A	8
9	2	(United Kingdom) Dario Franchitti	Mercedes C-Class	(Germany) D2 Mercedes-AMG	58.078	A	9
10	11	(Germany) Jörg van Ommen	Mercedes C-Class	(Germany) UPS Mercedes-AMG	59.320	A	10
11	44	(Germany) Hans-Joachim Stuck	Opel Calibra V6 4x4	(Germany) Team Rosberg Opel	55.686	B	11
12	5	(Italy) Nicola Larini	Alfa Romeo 155 V6 TI	(Italy) Martini Alfa Corse	55.696	B	12
13	25	(Austria) Alexander Wurz	Opel Calibra V6 4x4	(Germany) Joest Racing Opel	55.796	B	13
14	24	(France) Yannick Dalmas	Opel Calibra V6 4x4	(Germany) Joest Racing Opel	55.818	B	14
15	18	(Italy) Gabriele Tarquini	Alfa Romeo 155 V6 TI	(Italy) JAS Motorsport Alfa Romeo	56.134	B	15
16	6	(Italy) Alessandro Nannini	Alfa Romeo 155 V6 TI	(Italy) Martini Alfa Corse	56.324	B	16
17	8	(United Kingdom) Oliver Gavin	Opel Calibra V6 4x4	(Germany) Joest Racing Opel	56.356	B	17
18	4	(Germany) Alexander Grau	Mercedes C-Class	(Germany) Warsteiner Mercedes-AMG	56.407	B	18
19	10	(Germany) Michael Bartels	Alfa Romeo 155 V6 TI	(Italy) Jägermeister JAS Motorsport Alfa Romeo	56.562	B	19
20	15	(Germany) Christian Danner	Alfa Romeo 155 V6 TI	(Italy) TV Spielfilm Alfa Corse	56.854	B	20
21	12	(Denmark) Kurt Thiim	Mercedes C-Class	(Germany) UPS Mercedes-AMG	57.721	B	21
22	19	(Denmark) Jason Watt	Alfa Romeo 155 V6 TI	(Italy) Bosch JAS Motorsport Alfa Romeo	58.377	B	22
23	22	(Germany) Bernd Mayländer	Mercedes C-Class	(Germany) Persson Motorsport	58.494	B	23
24	21	(Germany) Ellen Lohr	Mercedes C-Class	(Germany) Persson Motorsport	58.711	B	24
25	13	(Italy) Gianni Giudici	Alfa Romeo 155 V6 TI	(Italy) Giudici Motorsport	59.777	B	25

=== Race 1 ===
Pos.	No.	Driver	Car	Team	Laps	Time/Retired	Grid	Points
1	17	(Germany) Klaus Ludwig	Opel Calibra V6 4x4	(Germany) Zakspeed Opel	44	37:27.861	2	20
2	16	(Germany) Uwe Alzen	Opel Calibra V6 4x4	(Germany) Zakspeed Opel	44	+0.089	1	15
3	9	(Italy) Stefano Modena	Alfa Romeo 155 V6 TI	(Italy) JAS Motorsport Alfa Romeo	44	+7.745	4	12
4	43	(Finland) JJ Lehto	Opel Calibra V6 4x4	(Germany) Team Rosberg Opel	44	+9.008	5	10
5	2	(United Kingdom) Dario Franchitti	Mercedes C-Class	(Germany) D2 Mercedes-AMG	44	+17.505	9	8
6	7	(Germany) Manuel Reuter	Opel Calibra V6 4x4	(Germany) Joest Racing Opel	44	+20.431	3	6
7	44	(Germany) Hans-Joachim Stuck	Opel Calibra V6 4x4	(Germany) Team Rosberg Opel	44	+20.836	11	4
8	11	(Germany) Jörg van Ommen	Mercedes C-Class	(Germany) UPS Mercedes-AMG	44	+21.892	10	3
9	1	(Germany) Bernd Schneider	Mercedes C-Class	(Germany) D2 Mercedes-AMG	44	+22.871	7	2
10	8	(United Kingdom) Oliver Gavin	Opel Calibra V6 4x4	(Germany) Joest Racing Opel	44	+27.916	17	1
11	14	(Italy) Giancarlo Fisichella	Alfa Romeo 155 V6 TI	(Italy) TV Spielfilm Alfa Corse	44	+31.901	6	
12	25	(Austria) Alexander Wurz	Opel Calibra V6 4x4	(Germany) Joest Racing Opel	44	+32.180	13	
13	4	(Germany) Alexander Grau	Mercedes C-Class	(Germany) Warsteiner Mercedes-AMG	44	+42.169	18	
14	21	(Germany) Ellen Lohr	Mercedes C-Class	(Germany) Persson Motorsport	44	+50.609	24	
15	19	(Denmark) Jason Watt	Alfa Romeo 155 V6 TI	(Italy) Bosch JAS Motorsport Alfa Romeo	43	Retired	22	
16	22	(Germany) Bernd Mayländer	Mercedes C-Class	(Germany) Persson Motorsport	43	Retired	23	
17	3	(Denmark) Jan Magnussen	Mercedes C-Class	(Germany) Warsteiner Mercedes-AMG	41	Retired	8	
Ret	5	(Italy) Nicola Larini	Alfa Romeo 155 V6 TI	(Italy) Martini Alfa Corse	38	Retired	12	
Ret	24	(France) Yannick Dalmas	Opel Calibra V6 4x4	(Germany) Joest Racing Opel	34	Retired	14	
Ret	15	(Germany) Christian Danner	Alfa Romeo 155 V6 TI	(Italy) TV Spielfilm Alfa Corse	34	Retired	20	
Ret	10	(Germany) Michael Bartels	Alfa Romeo 155 V6 TI	(Italy) Jägermeister JAS Motorsport Alfa Romeo	34	Retired	19	
Ret	6	(Italy) Alessandro Nannini	Alfa Romeo 155 V6 TI	(Italy) Martini Alfa Corse	27	Retired	16	
Ret	12	(Denmark) Kurt Thiim	Mercedes C-Class	(Germany) UPS Mercedes-AMG	21	Retired	21	
Ret	13	(Italy) Gianni Giudici	Alfa Romeo 155 V6 TI	(Italy) Giudici Motorsport	13	Retired	25	
Ret	18	(Italy) Gabriele Tarquini	Alfa Romeo 155 V6 TI	(Italy) JAS Motorsport Alfa Romeo	4	Retired	15	

=== Race 2 ===
Pos.	No.	Driver	Car	Team	Laps	Time/Retired	Grid	Points
1	17	(Germany) Klaus Ludwig	Opel Calibra V6 4x4	(Germany) Zakspeed Opel	44	36:51.009	1	20
2	16	(Germany) Uwe Alzen	Opel Calibra V6 4x4	(Germany) Zakspeed Opel	44	+1.759	2	15
3	43	(Finland) JJ Lehto	Opel Calibra V6 4x4	(Germany) Team Rosberg Opel	44	+11.408	4	12
4	44	(Germany) Hans-Joachim Stuck	Opel Calibra V6 4x4	(Germany) Team Rosberg Opel	44	+13.106	7	10
5	7	(Germany) Manuel Reuter	Opel Calibra V6 4x4	(Germany) Joest Racing Opel	44	+13.894	6	8
6	1	(Germany) Bernd Schneider	Mercedes C-Class	(Germany) D2 Mercedes-AMG	44	+20.229	9	6
7	11	(Germany) Jörg van Ommen	Mercedes C-Class	(Germany) UPS Mercedes-AMG	44	+20.816	8	4
8	25	(Austria) Alexander Wurz	Opel Calibra V6 4x4	(Germany) Joest Racing Opel	44	+21.241	12	3
9	21	(Germany) Ellen Lohr	Mercedes C-Class	(Germany) Persson Motorsport	43	+1 lap	14	2
10	4	(Germany) Alexander Grau	Mercedes C-Class	(Germany) Warsteiner Mercedes-AMG	43	+1 lap	13	1
11	22	(Germany) Bernd Mayländer	Mercedes C-Class	(Germany) Persson Motorsport	43	+1 lap	16	
12	8	(United Kingdom) Oliver Gavin	Opel Calibra V6 4x4	(Germany) Joest Racing Opel	43	+1 lap	10	
13	9	(Italy) Stefano Modena	Alfa Romeo 155 V6 TI	(Italy) JAS Motorsport Alfa Romeo	42	+2 laps	3	
14	14	(Italy) Giancarlo Fisichella	Alfa Romeo 155 V6 TI	(Italy) TV Spielfilm Alfa Corse	41	+3 laps	11	
15	13	(Italy) Gianni Giudici	Alfa Romeo 155 V6 TI	(Italy) Giudici Motorsport	40	+4 laps	24	
Ret	12	(Denmark) Kurt Thiim	Mercedes C-Class	(Germany) UPS Mercedes-AMG	36	Retired	23	
Ret	5	(Italy) Nicola Larini	Alfa Romeo 155 V6 TI	(Italy) Martini Alfa Corse	22	Retired	18	
Ret	6	(Italy) Alessandro Nannini	Alfa Romeo 155 V6 TI	(Italy) Martini Alfa Corse	22	Retired	22	
Ret	2	(United Kingdom) Dario Franchitti	Mercedes C-Class	(Germany) D2 Mercedes-AMG	2	Retired	5	
DNS	19	(Denmark) Jason Watt	Alfa Romeo 155 V6 TI	(Italy) Bosch JAS Motorsport Alfa Romeo		Did not start	15	
DNS	3	(Denmark) Jan Magnussen	Mercedes C-Class	(Germany) Warsteiner Mercedes-AMG		Did not start	17	
DNS	24	(France) Yannick Dalmas	Opel Calibra V6 4x4	(Germany) Joest Racing Opel		Did not start	19	
DNS	15	(Germany) Christian Danner	Alfa Romeo 155 V6 TI	(Italy) TV Spielfilm Alfa Corse		Did not start	20	
DNS	10	(Germany) Michael Bartels	Alfa Romeo 155 V6 TI	(Italy) Jägermeister JAS Motorsport Alfa Romeo		Did not start	21	
DNS	18	(Italy) Gabriele Tarquini	Alfa Romeo 155 V6 TI	(Italy) JAS Motorsport Alfa Romeo		Did not start	25	

== Standings after the event ==
Drivers' Championship standings

	Pos	Driver	Points
	1	(Germany) Manuel Reuter	130
	2	(Germany) Hans-Joachim Stuck	76
4	3	(Germany) Uwe Alzen	72
2	4	(Finland) JJ Lehto	65
6	5	(Germany) Klaus Ludwig	64

Manufacturers' Championship standings

Pos	Driver	Points
1	(Germany) Opel	171
2	(Germany) Mercedes	101
3	(Italy) Alfa Romeo	87

- Note: Only the top five positions are included for both sets of drivers' standings.
