= 1996 ITC Estoril round =

(Portugal) 1996 ITC Estoril round
Round details
- Round 3 of 13 rounds in the 1996 International Touring Car Championship
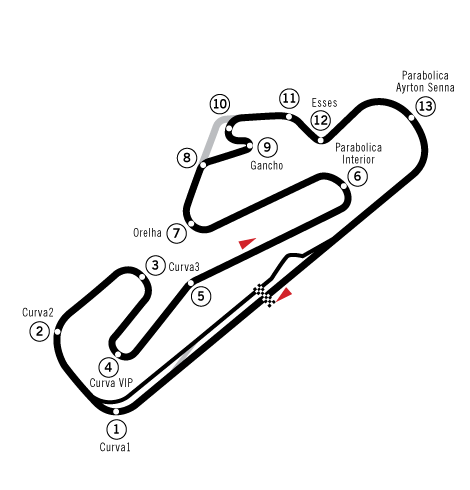
- Layout of the Autódromo do Estoril
- Location: Autódromo do Estoril, Estoril, Portugal
- Course: Permanent racing facility 4.182 km (2.599 mi)

International Touring Car Championship

Race 1
- Date: 26 May 1996
- Laps: 20

Pole position
Driver	(Italy) Alessandro Nannini	Martini Alfa Corse
- Time: 1:40.686

Podium
First	(Italy) Alessandro Nannini	Martini Alfa Corse
Second	(Italy) Giancarlo Fisichella	TV Spielfilm Alfa Corse
Third	(Germany) Klaus Ludwig	Zakspeed Opel

Fastest lap
Driver	(Italy) Alessandro Nannini	Martini Alfa Corse
- Time: 1:42.819 (on lap 2)

Race 2
- Date: 26 May 1996
- Laps: 20

Podium
First	(Italy) Alessandro Nannini	Martini Alfa Corse
Second	(Germany) Uwe Alzen	Zakspeed Opel
Third	(Germany) Manuel Reuter	Joest Racing Opel

Fastest lap
Driver	(Italy) Alessandro Nannini	Martini Alfa Corse
- Time: 1:42.806 (on lap 3)

The 1996 ITC Estoril round was the third round of the 1996 International Touring Car Championship season. It took place on 26 May at the Autódromo do Estoril.

Alessandro Nannini won both races, driving an Alfa Romeo 155 V6 TI.

== Classification ==
=== Qualifying ===
Pos.	No.	Driver	Car	Team	Time	Group	Grid
1	6	(Italy) Alessandro Nannini	Alfa Romeo 155 V6 TI	(Italy) Martini Alfa Corse	1:40.686	A	1
2	5	(Italy) Nicola Larini	Alfa Romeo 155 V6 TI	(Italy) Martini Alfa Corse	1:41.164	A	2
3	14	(Italy) Giancarlo Fisichella	Alfa Romeo 155 V6 TI	(Italy) TV Spielfilm Alfa Corse	1:41.347	A	3
4	17	(Germany) Klaus Ludwig	Opel Calibra V6 4x4	(Germany) Zakspeed Opel	1:41.615	A	4
5	7	(Germany) Manuel Reuter	Opel Calibra V6 4x4	(Germany) Joest Racing Opel	1:41.652	A	5
6	10	(Germany) Michael Bartels	Alfa Romeo 155 V6 TI	(Italy) Jägermeister JAS Motorsport Alfa Romeo	1:41.666	A	6
7	15	(Germany) Christian Danner	Alfa Romeo 155 V6 TI	(Italy) TV Spielfilm Alfa Corse	1:42.004	A	7
8	43	(Finland) JJ Lehto	Opel Calibra V6 4x4	(Germany) Team Rosberg Opel	1:42.116	A	8
9	44	(Germany) Hans-Joachim Stuck	Opel Calibra V6 4x4	(Germany) Team Rosberg Opel	1:42.560	A	9
10	16	(Germany) Uwe Alzen	Opel Calibra V6 4x4	(Germany) Zakspeed Opel	no time	A	10
11	8	(United Kingdom) Oliver Gavin	Opel Calibra V6 4x4	(Germany) Joest Racing Opel	1:41.336	B	11
12	12	(Denmark) Kurt Thiim	Mercedes C-Class	(Germany) UPS Mercedes-AMG	1:41.501	B	12
13	2	(United Kingdom) Dario Franchitti	Mercedes C-Class	(Germany) D2 Mercedes-AMG	1:41.665	B	13
14	3	(Denmark) Jan Magnussen	Mercedes C-Class	(Germany) Warsteiner Mercedes-AMG	1:41.753	B	14
15	11	(Germany) Jörg van Ommen	Mercedes C-Class	(Germany) UPS Mercedes-AMG	1:41.795	B	15
16	9	(Italy) Stefano Modena	Alfa Romeo 155 V6 TI	(Italy) JAS Motorsport Alfa Romeo	1:42.084	B	16
17	24	(France) Yannick Dalmas	Opel Calibra V6 4x4	(Germany) Joest Racing Opel	1:42.108	B	17
18	18	(Italy) Gabriele Tarquini	Alfa Romeo 155 V6 TI	(Italy) JAS Motorsport Alfa Romeo	1:42.175	B	18
19	1	(Germany) Bernd Schneider	Mercedes C-Class	(Germany) D2 Mercedes-AMG	1:42.556	B	19
20	25	(Austria) Alexander Wurz	Opel Calibra V6 4x4	(Germany) Joest Racing Opel	1:43.418	B	20
21	4	(Germany) Alexander Grau	Mercedes C-Class	(Germany) Warsteiner Mercedes-AMG	1:43.635	B	21
22	22	(Germany) Bernd Mayländer	Mercedes C-Class	(Germany) Persson Motorsport	1:43.751	B	22
23	21	(Germany) Ellen Lohr	Mercedes C-Class	(Germany) Persson Motorsport	1:44.468	B	23
24	13	(Italy) Gianni Giudici	Alfa Romeo 155 V6 TI	(Italy) Giudici Motorsport	1:48.282	B	24
25	19	(Denmark) Jason Watt	Alfa Romeo 155 V6 TI	(Italy) Bosch JAS Motorsport Alfa Romeo	no time	B	25

=== Race 1 ===
Pos.	No.	Driver	Car	Team	Laps	Time/Retired	Grid	Points
1	6	(Italy) Alessandro Nannini	Alfa Romeo 155 V6 TI	(Italy) Martini Alfa Corse	20	34:57.869	1	20
2	14	(Italy) Giancarlo Fisichella	Alfa Romeo 155 V6 TI	(Italy) TV Spielfilm Alfa Corse	20	+3.456	3	15
3	17	(Germany) Klaus Ludwig	Opel Calibra V6 4x4	(Germany) Zakspeed Opel	20	+10.906	4	12
4	7	(Germany) Manuel Reuter	Opel Calibra V6 4x4	(Germany) Joest Racing Opel	20	+11.974	5	10
5	16	(Germany) Uwe Alzen	Opel Calibra V6 4x4	(Germany) Zakspeed Opel	20	+14.791	10	8
6	8	(United Kingdom) Oliver Gavin	Opel Calibra V6 4x4	(Germany) Joest Racing Opel	20	+17.421	11	6
7	11	(Germany) Jörg van Ommen	Mercedes C-Class	(Germany) UPS Mercedes-AMG	20	+17.606	15	4
8	24	(France) Yannick Dalmas	Opel Calibra V6 4x4	(Germany) Joest Racing Opel	20	+18.697	17	3
9	2	(United Kingdom) Dario Franchitti	Mercedes C-Class	(Germany) D2 Mercedes-AMG	20	+19.019	13	2
10	25	(Austria) Alexander Wurz	Opel Calibra V6 4x4	(Germany) Joest Racing Opel	20	+25.735	20	1
11	1	(Germany) Bernd Schneider	Mercedes C-Class	(Germany) D2 Mercedes-AMG	20	+27.350	19	
12	15	(Germany) Christian Danner	Alfa Romeo 155 V6 TI	(Italy) TV Spielfilm Alfa Corse	20	+36.162	7	
13	4	(Germany) Alexander Grau	Mercedes C-Class	(Germany) Warsteiner Mercedes-AMG	20	+40.245	21	
14	22	(Germany) Bernd Mayländer	Mercedes C-Class	(Germany) Persson Motorsport	20	+45.653	22	
15	19	(Denmark) Jason Watt	Alfa Romeo 155 V6 TI	(Italy) Bosch JAS Motorsport Alfa Romeo	20	+50.257	25	
16	43	(Finland) JJ Lehto	Opel Calibra V6 4x4	(Germany) Team Rosberg Opel	20	+1:05.563	8	
17	13	(Italy) Gianni Giudici	Alfa Romeo 155 V6 TI	(Italy) Giudici Motorsport	19	+1 lap	24	
18	10	(Germany) Michael Bartels	Alfa Romeo 155 V6 TI	(Italy) Jägermeister JAS Motorsport Alfa Romeo	19	+1 lap	6	
Ret	21	(Germany) Ellen Lohr	Mercedes C-Class	(Germany) Persson Motorsport	13	Retired	23	
Ret	5	(Italy) Nicola Larini	Alfa Romeo 155 V6 TI	(Italy) Martini Alfa Corse	9	Retired	2	
Ret	18	(Italy) Gabriele Tarquini	Alfa Romeo 155 V6 TI	(Italy) JAS Motorsport Alfa Romeo	8	Retired	18	
Ret	44	(Germany) Hans-Joachim Stuck	Opel Calibra V6 4x4	(Germany) Team Rosberg Opel	8	Retired	9	
Ret	3	(Denmark) Jan Magnussen	Mercedes C-Class	(Germany) Warsteiner Mercedes-AMG	7	Retired	14	
DNS	12	(Denmark) Kurt Thiim	Mercedes C-Class	(Germany) UPS Mercedes-AMG		Did not start	12	
DNS	9	(Italy) Stefano Modena	Alfa Romeo 155 V6 TI	(Italy) JAS Motorsport Alfa Romeo		Did not start	16	

=== Race 2 ===
Pos.	No.	Driver	Car	Team	Laps	Time/Retired	Grid	Points
1	6	(Italy) Alessandro Nannini	Alfa Romeo 155 V6 TI	(Italy) Martini Alfa Corse	20	34:46.099	1	20
2	16	(Germany) Uwe Alzen	Opel Calibra V6 4x4	(Germany) Zakspeed Opel	20	+3.302	5	15
3	7	(Germany) Manuel Reuter	Opel Calibra V6 4x4	(Germany) Joest Racing Opel	20	+4.293	4	12
4	11	(Germany) Jörg van Ommen	Mercedes C-Class	(Germany) UPS Mercedes-AMG	20	+4.696	7	10
5	14	(Italy) Giancarlo Fisichella	Alfa Romeo 155 V6 TI	(Italy) TV Spielfilm Alfa Corse	20	+11.954	2	8
6	8	(United Kingdom) Oliver Gavin	Opel Calibra V6 4x4	(Germany) Joest Racing Opel	20	+19.591	6	6
7	44	(Germany) Hans-Joachim Stuck	Opel Calibra V6 4x4	(Germany) Team Rosberg Opel	20	+20.235	22	4
8	25	(Austria) Alexander Wurz	Opel Calibra V6 4x4	(Germany) Joest Racing Opel	20	+20.734	10	3
9	9	(Italy) Stefano Modena	Alfa Romeo 155 V6 TI	(Italy) JAS Motorsport Alfa Romeo	20	+21.310	25	2
10	2	(United Kingdom) Dario Franchitti	Mercedes C-Class	(Germany) D2 Mercedes-AMG	20	+21.854	9	1
11	17	(Germany) Klaus Ludwig	Opel Calibra V6 4x4	(Germany) Zakspeed Opel	20	+22.251^{1}	3	
12	1	(Germany) Bernd Schneider	Mercedes C-Class	(Germany) D2 Mercedes-AMG	20	+26.515	11	
13	15	(Germany) Christian Danner	Alfa Romeo 155 V6 TI	(Italy) TV Spielfilm Alfa Corse	20	+46.263	12	
14	18	(Italy) Gabriele Tarquini	Alfa Romeo 155 V6 TI	(Italy) JAS Motorsport Alfa Romeo	20	+1:28.914	21	
15	13	(Italy) Gianni Giudici	Alfa Romeo 155 V6 TI	(Italy) Giudici Motorsport	19	+1 lap	17	
Ret	21	(Germany) Ellen Lohr	Mercedes C-Class	(Germany) Persson Motorsport	10	Retired	19	
Ret	3	(Denmark) Jan Magnussen	Mercedes C-Class	(Germany) Warsteiner Mercedes-AMG	3	Retired	23	
Ret	5	(Italy) Nicola Larini	Alfa Romeo 155 V6 TI	(Italy) Martini Alfa Corse	2	Retired	20	
Ret	43	(Finland) JJ Lehto	Opel Calibra V6 4x4	(Germany) Team Rosberg Opel	1	Retired	16	
Ret	22	(Germany) Bernd Mayländer	Mercedes C-Class	(Germany) Persson Motorsport	1	Retired	14	
Ret	10	(Germany) Michael Bartels	Alfa Romeo 155 V6 TI	(Italy) Jägermeister JAS Motorsport Alfa Romeo	1	Retired	18	
Ret	24	(France) Yannick Dalmas	Opel Calibra V6 4x4	(Germany) Joest Racing Opel	1	Retired	8	
DNS	4	(Germany) Alexander Grau	Mercedes C-Class	(Germany) Warsteiner Mercedes-AMG		Did not start	13	
DNS	19	(Denmark) Jason Watt	Alfa Romeo 155 V6 TI	(Italy) Bosch JAS Motorsport Alfa Romeo		Did not start	15	
DNS	12	(Denmark) Kurt Thiim	Mercedes C-Class	(Germany) UPS Mercedes-AMG		Did not start	24	

Notes:

- ^1 – Klaus Ludwig was given a 20-second penalty for causing a collision with Giancarlo Fisichella.

== Standings after the event ==
Drivers' Championship standings

	Pos	Driver	Points
	1	(Germany) Manuel Reuter	86
	2	(Denmark) Jan Magnussen	51
1	3	(United Kingdom) Dario Franchitti	43
3	4	(Germany) Uwe Alzen	42
12	5	(Italy) Alessandro Nannini	41

Manufacturers' Championship standings

	Pos	Driver	Points
1	1	(Germany) Opel	91
1	2	(Germany) Mercedes	81
	3	(Italy) Alfa Romeo	55

- Note: Only the top five positions are included for both sets of drivers' standings.
