= 1996 International Touring Car Championship =

Motorsports championship season

The 1996 International Touring Car Championship was the thirteenth season of premier German touring car championship and also only first and final season under the moniker of International Touring Car Championship. It was for FIA Class 1 Touring Cars and it was contested by Mercedes-Benz, Alfa Romeo and Opel. It was formed of the Deutsche Tourenwagen Meisterschaft series that ran both a short German & International-based series in 1995. These were fused together to form the International Touring Car Championship (abbreviated to ITC). The eventual champion was Manuel Reuter driving an Opel Calibra, and Opel won the manufacturer's championship.

== Season summary ==
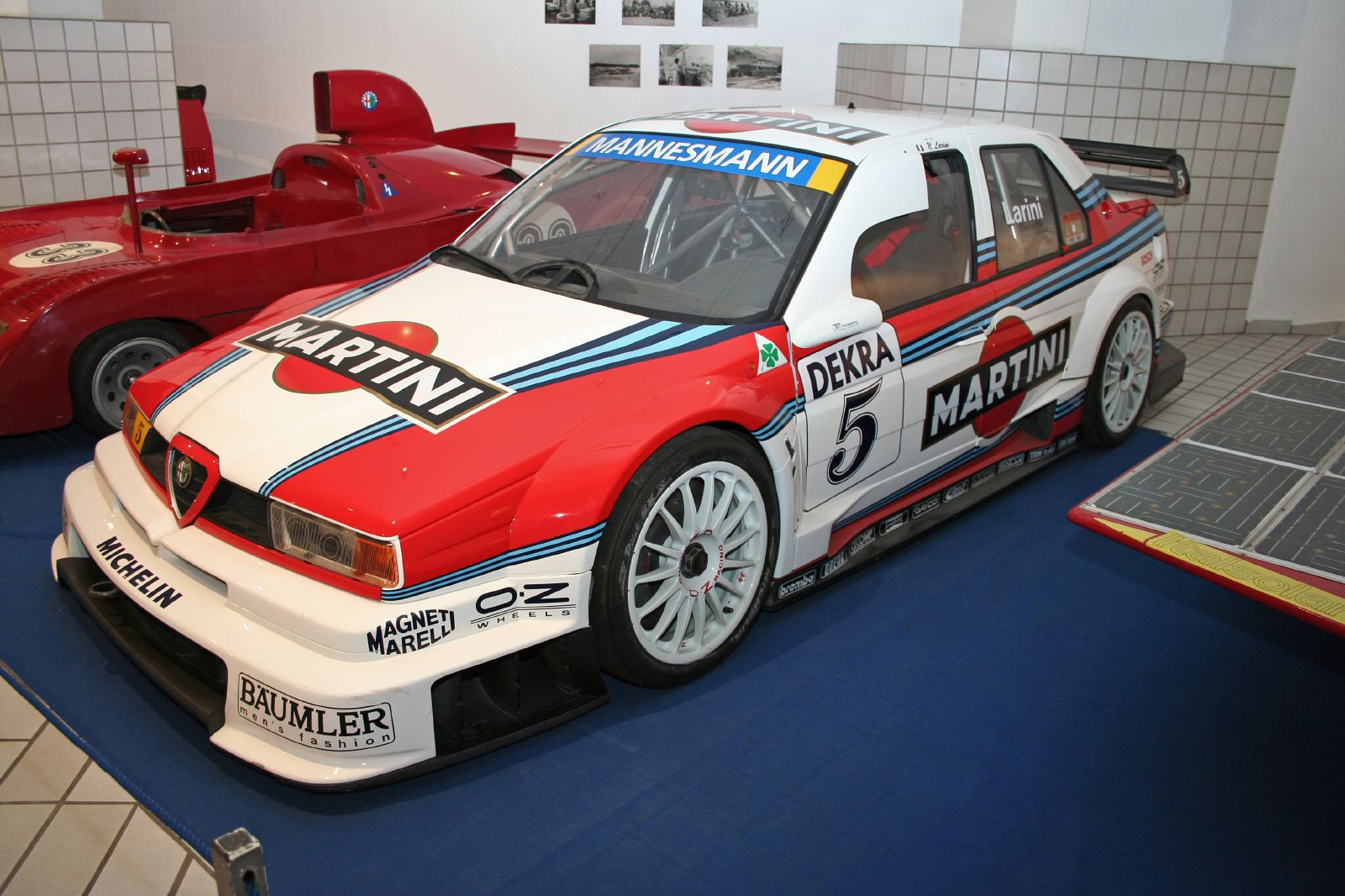
Alfa Romeo 155 V6 TI of Nicola Larini

The Class 1 rules made sure that all cars had a pure-bred 2,5 L V6 racing engine, lots of electronics, and few things in common with the road cars, except Mercedes sticking to the standard RWD layout while the other two implemented AWD drivetrains. All three manufacturers were relatively equally-matched and competitive all season, with Opel's other winning drivers besides Reuter being the experienced Hans-Joachim Stuck, who took a double victory in Helsinki, and 1994 champion Klaus Ludwig who repeated the feat at Norisring. Alfa Romeo came second to Opel in the standings, with former Benetton Formula One driver Alessandro Nannini taking a convincing seven victories, including four-in-a-row midseason, to place third in the championship. Team-mate and compatriot Nicola Larini could manage just two wins late in a season blighted with retirements, meaning the Ferrari test driver would not be a feature in the title battle.

Mercedes-Benz may have finished third and last in the constructors standings, but were every bit as competitive as their two rivals. Reigning DTM & ITC champion Bernd Schneider racked up four wins, including a double at Diepholz, en route to second in the championship, though 1995's DTM runner-up Jörg van Ommen scored a solitary win in a lacklustre campaign. Their junior team-mates – future Stewart driver Jan Magnussen and IndyCar Series star to-be Dario Franchitti – also scored a win apiece in the first and last rounds of the series respectively. This meant the Scot placed a creditable fourth in the standings, whilst the Dane's mid-season defection to CART along with a number of retirements served to prevent him from challenging for the title. Others who impressed but failed to win a race included sometime Benetton and Sauber driver JJ Lehto for Opel, young Italian Giancarlo Fisichella, who combined an assured sophomore tin-top season for Alfa Romeo with a part-season for the Minardi F1 team, and former Porsche Supercup champion Uwe Alzen who completed the championship top ten by finishing in eighth for Opel.

Looking further down the field, ex-Tyrrell and Jordan F1 driver Stefano Modena endured an average season with Alfa Romeo, whilst fellow Alfa Romeo driver and former BTCC champion Gabriele Tarquini suffered from appalling luck which severely hampered his title tilt despite taking a convincing victory at Silverstone. Christian Danner also disappointed for Alfa Romeo, whilst the respective team-mates of Reuter and Schneider – Le Mans winner Yannick Dalmas and former DTM champion Kurt Thiim – curiously also had torrid seasons. The latter was replaced at the end of the season, along with future F1 driver Alexander Wurz and Jason Watt, as all three manufacturers elected to enter a local driver each during the last two events at Interlagos and Suzuka. Among these, German F3 regular Max Wilson was the most impressive, the Brazilian finishing second on home turf at Interlagos.

In the end, it was consistency that gifted Reuter the title – he scored points during the first fifteen races of the season, and only failed to do so six times all season. In comparison, Schneider failed to score nine times and Nannini twelve, despite both taking more wins with four and seven respectively as opposed to Reuter's three.

Despite boasting a tremendously strong driver line-up, consisting largely of former F1 drivers, ostensibly robust manufacturer support, and focus on well-balanced Class 1 rules with fast touring cars powered by high revving engines, the series suffered from poor media exposure and television coverage. In Germany, the success of Michael Schumacher had drawn attention and money towards Formula 1, which along with lacklustre spectator attendance figures meant there was comparatively little money coming into the series in comparison to the huge cost of running a 'Class 1' touring car. The series had moved away from popular German race tracks, like the Nürburgring Nordschleife, to venues abroad. This was exacerbated by two long intercontinental journeys to Interlagos and Suzuka, circuits located in countries where some of the competing road car models weren't actually sold. This meant that Alfa Romeo and Opel announced in September they would pull out at the end of the series, despite having hitherto committed themselves to compete until the end of 1997, and driven up costs with the use of 4x4. With Mercedes-Benz the only manufacturer remaining committed for 1997, the series was cancelled. AMG-Mercedes quickly shifted to the new FIA GT series and developed the Mercedes-Benz CLK GTR in only 128 days, winning the series in 1997 and 1998 and effectively killing it with dominance. It wouldn't be until 2000 that a high powered touring car championship was resurrected, albeit as the new DTM which was based firmly in Germany, using V8 powered race cars under bodyshells that looked like roadgoing 2-door coupes.

== Teams and drivers ==
Manufacturer	Car	Team	No.	Drivers	Rounds
Mercedes-Benz	Mercedes-Benz C-Class	(Germany) D2 Mercedes-AMG	1	(Germany) Bernd Schneider	All
Mercedes-Benz	Mercedes-Benz C-Class	(Germany) D2 Mercedes-AMG	2	(United Kingdom) Dario Franchitti	All
Mercedes-Benz	Mercedes-Benz C-Class	(Germany) Warsteiner Mercedes-AMG	3	(Denmark) Jan Magnussen	1–6, 9–13
Mercedes-Benz	Mercedes-Benz C-Class	(Germany) Warsteiner Mercedes-AMG	3	(Colombia) Juan Pablo Montoya	7
Mercedes-Benz	Mercedes-Benz C-Class	(Germany) Warsteiner Mercedes-AMG	3	(Brazil) Ricardo Zonta	8
Mercedes-Benz	Mercedes-Benz C-Class	(Germany) Warsteiner Mercedes-AMG	4	(Germany) Alexander Grau	1–6
Mercedes-Benz	Mercedes-Benz C-Class	(Germany) Warsteiner Mercedes-AMG	4	(Germany) Bernd Mayländer	7–13
Mercedes-Benz	Mercedes-Benz C-Class	(Germany) UPS Mercedes-AMG	11	(Germany) Jörg van Ommen	All
Mercedes-Benz	Mercedes-Benz C-Class	(Germany) UPS Mercedes-AMG	12	(Denmark) Kurt Thiim	1–11
Mercedes-Benz	Mercedes-Benz C-Class	(Germany) UPS Mercedes-AMG	12	(Brazil) Christian Fittipaldi	12
Mercedes-Benz	Mercedes-Benz C-Class	(Germany) UPS Mercedes-AMG	12	(Japan) Aguri Suzuki	13
Mercedes-Benz	Mercedes-Benz C-Class	(Germany) Persson Motorsport	21	(Germany) Ellen Lohr	1–8
Mercedes-Benz	Mercedes-Benz C-Class	(Germany) Persson Motorsport	21	(Germany) Alexander Grau	9–13
Mercedes-Benz	Mercedes-Benz C-Class	(Germany) Persson Motorsport	22	(Germany) Bernd Mayländer	1–6
Mercedes-Benz	Mercedes-Benz C-Class	(Germany) Persson Motorsport	22	(Germany) Alexander Grau	7–8
Mercedes-Benz	Mercedes-Benz C-Class	(Germany) Persson Motorsport	22	(Germany) Ellen Lohr	9–13
Mercedes-Benz	Mercedes-Benz C-Class	(Germany) Persson Motorsport	37	(Thailand) Ratanakul Prutirat	6
Alfa Romeo	Alfa Romeo 155 V6 TI	(Italy) Martini Alfa Corse	5	(Italy) Nicola Larini	All
Alfa Romeo	Alfa Romeo 155 V6 TI	(Italy) Martini Alfa Corse	6	(Italy) Alessandro Nannini	All
Alfa Romeo	Alfa Romeo 155 V6 TI	(Italy) JAS Motorsport Alfa Romeo	9	(Italy) Stefano Modena	All
Alfa Romeo	Alfa Romeo 155 V6 TI	(Italy) JAS Motorsport Alfa Romeo	18	(Italy) Gabriele Tarquini	All
Alfa Romeo	Alfa Romeo 155 V6 TI	(Italy) Jägermeister JAS Motorsport Alfa Romeo	10	(Germany) Michael Bartels	All
Alfa Romeo	Alfa Romeo 155 V6 TI	(Italy) Bosch JAS Motorsport Alfa Romeo	19	(Denmark) Jason Watt	1–11
Alfa Romeo	Alfa Romeo 155 V6 TI	(Italy) Bosch JAS Motorsport Alfa Romeo	19	(Brazil) Max Wilson	12
Alfa Romeo	Alfa Romeo 155 V6 TI	(Italy) Bosch JAS Motorsport Alfa Romeo	19	(Japan) Naoki Hattori	13
Alfa Romeo	Alfa Romeo 155 V6 TI	(Italy) Giudici Motorsport	13	(Italy) Gianni Giudici	1–5
Alfa Romeo	Alfa Romeo 155 V6 TI	(Italy) TV Spielfilm Alfa Corse	14	(Italy) Giancarlo Fisichella	All
Alfa Romeo	Alfa Romeo 155 V6 TI	(Italy) TV Spielfilm Alfa Corse	15	(Germany) Christian Danner	All
Opel	Opel Calibra V6 4×4	(Germany) Joest Racing Opel	7	(Germany) Manuel Reuter	All
Opel	Opel Calibra V6 4×4	(Germany) Joest Racing Opel	8	(United Kingdom) Oliver Gavin	1–10, 12–13
Opel	Opel Calibra V6 4×4	(Germany) Joest Racing Opel	8	(Japan) Masanori Sekiya	11
Opel	Opel Calibra V6 4×4	(Germany) Joest Racing Opel	23	(Germany) Volker Strycek	8
Opel	Opel Calibra V6 4×4	(Germany) Joest Racing Opel	24	(France) Yannick Dalmas	All
Opel	Opel Calibra V6 4×4	(Germany) Joest Racing Opel	25	(Austria) Alexander Wurz	1–11
Opel	Opel Calibra V6 4×4	(Germany) Joest Racing Opel	25	(Brazil) Tony Kanaan	12
Opel	Opel Calibra V6 4×4	(Germany) Joest Racing Opel	25	(Japan) Masanori Sekiya	13
Opel	Opel Calibra V6 4×4	(Germany) Zakspeed Team Opel	16	(Germany) Uwe Alzen	All
Opel	Opel Calibra V6 4×4	(Germany) Zakspeed Team Opel	17	(Germany) Klaus Ludwig	1–9, 11–13
Opel	Opel Calibra V6 4×4	(Germany) Zakspeed Team Opel	17	(Germany) Volker Strycek	10
Opel	Opel Calibra V6 4×4	(Germany) Team Rosberg Opel	43	(Finland) JJ Lehto	All
Opel	Opel Calibra V6 4×4	(Germany) Team Rosberg Opel	44	(Germany) Hans-Joachim Stuck	All
Opel	Opel Calibra V6 4×4	(Italy) Giudici Motorsport	13	(Italy) Gianni Giudici	6–8, 10–11

== Schedule and results ==
Round		Country	Circuit	Date	Pole position	Fastest lap	Winning driver	Winning team	Report
1	R1	Germany	Hockenheimring (Short Circuit)	14 April	(Italy) Nicola Larini	(Italy) Alessandro Nannini	(Germany) Manuel Reuter	Joest Racing Opel	Report
1	R2	Germany	Hockenheimring (Short Circuit)	14 April		(Denmark) Jan Magnussen	(Denmark) Jan Magnussen	Warsteiner Mercedes-AMG	Report
2	R1	Germany	Nürburgring	12 May	(Germany) Jörg van Ommen	(United Kingdom) Dario Franchitti	(Germany) Jörg van Ommen	UPS Mercedes-AMG	Report
2	R2	Germany	Nürburgring	12 May		(Germany) Jörg van Ommen	(Germany) Manuel Reuter	Joest Racing Opel	Report
3	R1	Portugal	Autódromo do Estoril	26 May	(Italy) Alessandro Nannini	(Italy) Alessandro Nannini	(Italy) Alessandro Nannini	Martini Alfa Corse	Report
3	R2	Portugal	Autódromo do Estoril	26 May		(Italy) Alessandro Nannini	(Italy) Alessandro Nannini	Martini Alfa Corse	Report
4	R1	Finland	Helsinki Thunder	9 June	(Germany) Hans-Joachim Stuck	(United Kingdom) Dario Franchitti	(Germany) Hans-Joachim Stuck	Team Rosberg Opel	Report
4	R2	Finland	Helsinki Thunder	9 June		(Germany) Hans-Joachim Stuck	(Germany) Hans-Joachim Stuck	Team Rosberg Opel	Report
5	R1	Germany	Norisring	23 June	(Germany) Uwe Alzen	(Germany) Uwe Alzen	(Germany) Klaus Ludwig	Zakspeed Opel	Report
5	R2	Germany	Norisring	23 June		(Germany) Uwe Alzen	(Germany) Klaus Ludwig	Zakspeed Opel	Report
6	R1	Germany	Diepholz Airfield Circuit	7 July	(Germany) Bernd Schneider	(Germany) Bernd Schneider	(Germany) Bernd Schneider	D2 Mercedes-AMG	Report
6	R2	Germany	Diepholz Airfield Circuit	7 July		(Austria) Alexander Wurz	(Germany) Bernd Schneider	D2 Mercedes-AMG	Report
7	R1	(United Kingdom) Great Britain	Silverstone Circuit	18 August	(Germany) Klaus Ludwig	(Italy) Alessandro Nannini	(Germany) Klaus Ludwig	Zakspeed Opel	Report
7	R2	(United Kingdom) Great Britain	Silverstone Circuit	18 August		(Italy) Gabriele Tarquini	(Italy) Gabriele Tarquini	JAS Motorsport Alfa Romeo	Report
8	R1	Germany	Nürburgring	1 September	(Italy) Alessandro Nannini	(Italy) Alessandro Nannini	(Italy) Alessandro Nannini	Martini Alfa Corse	Report
8	R2	Germany	Nürburgring	1 September		(Italy) Alessandro Nannini	(Italy) Alessandro Nannini	Martini Alfa Corse	Report
9	R1	France	Circuit de Nevers Magny-Cours	15 September	(Italy) Nicola Larini	(Italy) Giancarlo Fisichella	(Italy) Alessandro Nannini	Martini Alfa Corse	Report
9	R2	France	Circuit de Nevers Magny-Cours	15 September		(Italy) Giancarlo Fisichella	(Italy) Alessandro Nannini	Martini Alfa Corse	Report
10	R1	Italy	Mugello Circuit	29 September	(Italy) Nicola Larini	(Italy) Nicola Larini	(Italy) Nicola Larini	Martini Alfa Corse	Report
10	R2	Italy	Mugello Circuit	29 September		(Germany) Bernd Schneider	(Germany) Bernd Schneider	D2 Mercedes-AMG	Report
11	R1	Germany	Hockenheimring (GP Circuit)	13 October	(Germany) Klaus Ludwig	(Germany) Uwe Alzen	(Germany) Klaus Ludwig	Zakspeed Opel	Report
11	R2	Germany	Hockenheimring (GP Circuit)	13 October		(Germany) Manuel Reuter	(Germany) Manuel Reuter	Joest Racing Opel	Report
12	R1	Brazil	Autódromo José Carlos Pace	27 October	(Germany) Christian Danner	(Italy) Alessandro Nannini	(Italy) Alessandro Nannini	Martini Alfa Corse	Report
12	R2	Brazil	Autódromo José Carlos Pace	27 October		(Italy) Giancarlo Fisichella	(Italy) Nicola Larini	Martini Alfa Corse	Report
13	R1	Japan	Suzuka Circuit	10 November (Note: The race in Japan was originally scheduled to be held at TI Circuit Aida on 4 August, but was moved to Suzuka and postponed to 10 November due to poor ticket sales.)	(Germany) Christian Danner	(Germany) Christian Danner	(United Kingdom) Dario Franchitti	D2 Mercedes-AMG	Report
13	R2	Japan	Suzuka Circuit	10 November		(Germany) Bernd Schneider	(Germany) Bernd Schneider	D2 Mercedes-AMG	Report

== Drivers Championship standings ==
Pos	Driver	HOC1 (Germany)		NÜR1 (Germany)		EST (Portugal)		HEL (Finland)		NOR (Germany)		DIE (Germany)		SIL (United Kingdom)		NÜR2 (Germany)		MAG (France)		MUG (Italy)		HOC2 (Germany)		INT (Brazil)		SUZ (Japan)		Pts
1	(Germany) Manuel Reuter	1	**3**	3	1	4	3	2	2	6	5	10	6	6	6	4	16	Ret	DNS	18	7	2	1	4	4	13	14	218
2	(Germany) Bernd Schneider	4	2	4	6	11	12	16	Ret	9	6	**1**	**1**	16	5	2	2	Ret	8	2	1	14^{†}	Ret	5	14	3	1	205
3	(Italy) Alessandro Nannini	10	13	EX	EX	**1**	**1**	14	4	Ret	Ret	6	Ret	17	11	**1**	**1**	1	**1**	11	Ret	6	Ret	1	**5**	10	5	180
4	(United Kingdom) Dario Franchitti	3	4	2	8	9	10	17^{†}	DNS	5	Ret	2	2	21^{†}	14	3	3	6	4	4	2	Ret	7	13	10	1	**Ret**	171
5	(Finland) JJ Lehto	15	Ret	5	2	16	Ret	5	3	4	3	7	Ret	5	2	7	5	5	3	9	15^{†}	5	8	6	9	Ret	8	148
6	(Italy) Giancarlo Fisichella	7	10	EX	EX	2	5	12	5	11	Ret	3	Ret	Ret	9	5	4	3	2	3	13	12	5	12	16	4	2	139
7	(Germany) Klaus Ludwig	Ret	DNS	Ret	Ret	3	11	3	Ret	1	**1**	Ret	Ret	**1**	**Ret**	Ret	11	9	5			**1**	**2**	Ret	Ret	Ret	10	130
8	(Germany) Uwe Alzen	8	6	18	4	5	2	13	Ret	**2**	2	11	10	13	Ret	12	6	4	13	7	3	3	Ret	Ret	DNS	9	12	119
9	(Germany) Hans-Joachim Stuck	5	7	6	14^{†}	Ret	7	**1**	**1**	7	4	5	4	12	15	22^{†}	12	7	Ret	5	16^{†}	17^{†}	9	7	Ret	18	18^{†}	112
10	(Denmark) Jan Magnussen	2	1	7	3	Ret	Ret	Ret	DNS	17^{†}	DNS	16	Ret					Ret	Ret	Ret	5	Ret	4	14	3	7	3	97
11	(Italy) Nicola Larini	**11**	12	Ret	7	Ret	Ret	Ret	6	Ret	Ret	Ret	DNS	3	Ret	6	15	**2**	Ret	**1**	**Ret**	Ret	Ret	Ret	1	6	6	95
12	(Italy) Stefano Modena	Ret	DNS	17	Ret	DNS	9	7	Ret	3	13	4	3	4	Ret	13	10	13	7	Ret	14	Ret	10	2	8	5	4	92
13	(Germany) Jörg van Ommen	Ret	9	**1**	**13**^{†}	7	4	9	Ret	8	7	13	5	18	Ret	9	8	8	9	NC	8	8	3	15	6	14	13	87
14	(Italy) Gabriele Tarquini	Ret	DNS	10	5	Ret	14	Ret	DNS	Ret	DNS	20	DNS	2	1	Ret	17	15^{†}	Ret	13	6	4	Ret	Ret	DNS	DNS	Ret	60
15	(Germany) Christian Danner	13	Ret	9	10	12	13	8	Ret	Ret	DNS	15	Ret	10	13	18	20	Ret	DNS	12	Ret	7	6	**3**	Ret	**2**	7	48
16	(Austria) Alexander Wurz	Ret	Ret	12	DSQ	10	8	Ret	9	12	8	9	8	7	4	Ret	DNS	10	6	6	9	Ret	DNS					43
17	(France) Yannick Dalmas	Ret	11	Ret	DNS	8	Ret	6	Ret	Ret	DNS	12	7	9	7	8	7	Ret	DNS	10	10	18^{†}	Ret	8	11	12	9	33
18	(Denmark) Kurt Thiim	12	8	8	12^{†}	DNS	DNS	18^{†}	Ret	Ret	Ret	14	11	Ret	10	10	Ret	11	10	8	4	10	Ret					23
19	(Brazil) Max Wilson																							9	2			17
20	(Denmark) Jason Watt	Ret	Ret	13	9	15	DNS	DNS	DNS	15^{†}	DNS	22	12	8	3	14	Ret	Ret	12	14	Ret	Ret	Ret					17
21	(Germany) Michael Bartels	14	14	11	Ret	18	Ret	4	Ret	Ret	DNS	8	Ret	DSQ	8	15	14	Ret	DNS	20	DNS	13	Ret	Ret	17	15	17^{†}	16
22	(Germany) Alexander Grau	6	5	Ret	DNS	13	DNS	Ret	10	13	10	18	Ret	15	Ret	17	18	14	11	15	11	Ret	12	17	12	17	15	16
23	(United Kingdom) Oliver Gavin	Ret	DNS	14	Ret	6	6	10^{†}	Ret	10	12	17	9	11	Ret	16	Ret	12	15	17	Ret			11	15	16	11	16
24	(Germany) Bernd Mayländer	Ret	Ret	16	Ret	14	Ret	11	7	16^{†}	11	19	14	14	Ret	11	9	Ret	DNS	Ret	Ret	9	Ret	16	7	8	Ret	15
25	(Germany) Ellen Lohr	9	Ret	15	11	Ret	Ret	15	8	14	9	21	13	20	12	20	21	Ret	14	16	12	11	11	18^{†}	13	21	Ret	7
26	(Brazil) Christian Fittipaldi																							10	Ret			1
27	(Japan) Aguri Suzuki																									11	DNS	0
28	(Japan) Masanori Sekiya																					15	13			20	DNS	0
29	(Brazil) Ricardo Zonta															Ret	13											0
30	(Italy) Gianni Giudici	Ret	15	Ret	DNS	17	15	19	NC	Ret	14	Ret	Ret	19	Ret	21	22			Ret	Ret	16	Ret					0
31	(Japan) Naoki Hattori																									19	16	0
32	(Germany) Volker Strycek															19	19			19	Ret							0
	(Colombia) Juan Pablo Montoya													Ret	Ret													0
	(Brazil) Tony Kanaan																							Ret	Ret			0
	(Thailand) Ratanakul Prutirat (Note: The DTM/ITC had a 105%-limit to qualify for a race. Prutirat was the only driver ever to be caught by this.)											DNQ	DNQ															0
Pos	Driver	HOC1 (Germany)		NÜR (Germany)		EST (Portugal)		HEL (Finland)		NOR (Germany)		DIE (Germany)		SIL (United Kingdom)		NÜR (Germany)		MAG (France)		MUG (Italy)		HOC2 (Germany)		INT (Brazil)		SUZ (Japan)		Pts

Colour	Result
Gold	Winner
Silver	Second place
Bronze	Third place
Green	Points classification
Blue	Non-points classification
Blue	Non-classified finish (NC)
Purple	Retired, not classified (Ret)
Red	Did not qualify (DNQ)
Red	Did not pre-qualify (DNPQ)
Black	Disqualified (DSQ)
White	Did not start (DNS)
White	Withdrew (WD)
White	Race cancelled (C)
Blank	Did not practice (DNP)
Blank	Did not arrive (DNA)
Blank	Excluded (EX)

**Bold** – Pole
Italics – Fastest Lap

† Drivers did not finish the race, but were classified as they completed over 90% of the race distance.

Note: bold signifies pole position, italics signifies fastest lap. Grid order for race 2 was decided by the finishing order in race 1.

=== Notes ===
- Points System: 20–15–12–10–8–6–4–3–2–1 for the Top 10 drivers in each race. No extra points awarded.

== Manufacturers Championship Standings ==
Final placings in the 1996 FIA Touring Car International Championship for Manufacturers were:

Pos	Manufacturer	HOC 1 (Germany)	HOC 2 (Germany)	NÜR 1 (Germany)	NÜR 2 (Germany)	EST 1 (Portugal)	EST 2 (Portugal)	HEL 1 (Finland)	HEL 2 (Finland)	NOR 1 (Germany)	NOR 2 (Germany)	DIE 1 (Germany)	DIE 2 (Germany)	SIL 1 (United Kingdom)	SIL 2 (United Kingdom)	NUR 1 (Germany)	NUR 2 (Germany)	MAG 1 (France)	MAG 2 (France)	MUG 1 (Italy)	MUG 2 (Italy)	HOC 1 (Germany)	HOC 2 (Germany)	INT 1 (Brazil)	INT 2 (Brazil)	SUZ 1 (Japan)	SUZ 2 (Japan)	Pts
1	Opel	1	3	3	1	3	2	1	1	1	1	5	4	1	2	4	5	4	3	5	3	1	1	4	4	9	8	349
2	Alfa Romeo	7	10	9	5	1	1	4	4	3	13	3	3	2	1	1	1	1	1	1	6	4	5	1	1	2	2	340
3	Mercedes-Benz	2	1	1	3	7	4	9	7	5	6	1	1	14	5	2	2	6	4	2	1	8	3	5	3	1	1	305
Pos	Manufacturer	HOC 1 (Germany)	HOC 2 (Germany)	NÜR 1 (Germany)	NÜR 2 (Germany)	EST 1 (Portugal)	EST 2 (Portugal)	HEL 1 (Finland)	HEL 2 (Finland)	NOR 1 (Germany)	NOR 2 (Germany)	DIE 1 (Germany)	DIE 2 (Germany)	SIL 1 (United Kingdom)	SIL 2 (United Kingdom)	NUR 1 (Germany)	NUR 2 (Germany)	MAG 1 (France)	MAG 2 (France)	MUG 1 (Italy)	MUG 2 (Italy)	HOC 1 (Germany)	HOC 2 (Germany)	INT 1 (Brazil)	INT 2 (Brazil)	SUZ 1 (Japan)	SUZ 2 (Japan)	Pts

== Bibliography ==
- Voigt, Thomas (1996). Tourenwagen Story '96: Die Rennen, die Fahrer, die Technik (in German). Berlin: Sportverlag Berlin. ISBN 978-3-328-00706-7.
