= 1996 ITC Mugello round =

(Italy) 1996 ITC Mugello round
Round details
- Round 10 of 13 rounds in the 1996 International Touring Car Championship
- Layout of the Mugello Circuit
- Location: Mugello Circuit, Scarperia, Italy
- Course: Permanent racing facility 5.245 km (3.259 mi)

International Touring Car Championship

Race 1
- Date: 29 September 1996
- Laps: 20

Pole position
Driver	(Italy) Nicola Larini	Martini Alfa Corse
- Time: 1:47.732

Podium
First	(Italy) Nicola Larini	Martini Alfa Corse
Second	(Germany) Bernd Schneider	D2 Mercedes-AMG
Third	(Italy) Giancarlo Fisichella	TV Spielfilm Alfa Corse

Fastest lap
Driver	(Italy) Nicola Larini	Martini Alfa Corse
- Time: 1:50.514 (on lap 5)

Race 2
- Date: 29 September 1996
- Laps: 20

Podium
First	(Germany) Bernd Schneider	D2 Mercedes-AMG
Second	(United Kingdom) Dario Franchitti	D2 Mercedes-AMG
Third	(Germany) Uwe Alzen	Zakspeed Opel

Fastest lap
Driver	(Germany) Bernd Schneider	D2 Mercedes-AMG
- Time: 1:49.800 (on lap 3)

The 1996 ITC Mugello round was the tenth round of the 1996 International Touring Car Championship season. It took place on 29 September at the Mugello Circuit.

Nicola Larini won the first race, starting from pole position, driving an Alfa Romeo 155 V6 TI, and Bernd Schneider gained the second one, driving a Mercedes C-Class.

== Classification ==
=== Qualifying ===
Pos.	No.	Driver	Car	Team	Time	Grid
1	5	(Italy) Nicola Larini	Alfa Romeo 155 V6 TI	(Italy) Martini Alfa Corse	1:47.732	1
2	1	(Germany) Bernd Schneider	Mercedes C-Class	(Germany) D2 Mercedes-AMG	1:48.293	2
3	14	(Italy) Giancarlo Fisichella	Alfa Romeo 155 V6 TI	(Italy) TV Spielfilm Alfa Corse	1:48.303	3
4	6	(Italy) Alessandro Nannini	Alfa Romeo 155 V6 TI	(Italy) Martini Alfa Corse	1:48.479	4
5	16	(Germany) Uwe Alzen	Opel Calibra V6 4x4	(Germany) Zakspeed Opel	1:48.503	5
6	18	(Italy) Gabriele Tarquini	Alfa Romeo 155 V6 TI	(Italy) JAS Motorsport Alfa Romeo	1:48.561	6
7	25	(Austria) Alexander Wurz	Opel Calibra V6 4x4	(Germany) Joest Racing Opel	1:48.603	7
8	11	(Germany) Jörg van Ommen	Mercedes C-Class	(Germany) UPS Mercedes-AMG	1:48.611	8
9	15	(Germany) Christian Danner	Alfa Romeo 155 V6 TI	(Italy) TV Spielfilm Alfa Corse	1:48.619	9
10	7	(Germany) Manuel Reuter	Opel Calibra V6 4x4	(Germany) Joest Racing Opel	1:48.716	10
11	43	(Finland) JJ Lehto	Opel Calibra V6 4x4	(Germany) Team Rosberg Opel	1:48.771	11
12	12	(Denmark) Kurt Thiim	Mercedes C-Class	(Germany) UPS Mercedes-AMG	1:48.850	12
13	2	(United Kingdom) Dario Franchitti	Mercedes C-Class	(Germany) D2 Mercedes-AMG	1:49.001	13
14	10	(Germany) Michael Bartels	Alfa Romeo 155 V6 TI	(Italy) Jägermeister JAS Motorsport Alfa Romeo	1:49.330	14
15	9	(Italy) Stefano Modena	Alfa Romeo 155 V6 TI	(Italy) JAS Motorsport Alfa Romeo	1:49.363	15
16	3	(Denmark) Jan Magnussen	Mercedes C-Class	(Germany) Warsteiner Mercedes-AMG	1:49.638	16
17	8	(United Kingdom) Oliver Gavin	Opel Calibra V6 4x4	(Germany) Joest Racing Opel	1:49.662	17
18	19	(Denmark) Jason Watt	Alfa Romeo 155 V6 TI	(Italy) Bosch JAS Motorsport Alfa Romeo	1:49.779	18
19	44	(Germany) Hans-Joachim Stuck	Opel Calibra V6 4x4	(Germany) Team Rosberg Opel	1:49.932	19
20	24	(France) Yannick Dalmas	Opel Calibra V6 4x4	(Germany) Joest Racing Opel	1:50.030	20
21	4	(Germany) Bernd Mayländer	Mercedes C-Class	(Germany) Warsteiner Mercedes-AMG	1:50.049	21
22	21	(Germany) Alexander Grau	Mercedes C-Class	(Germany) Persson Motorsport	1:50.197	22
23	22	(Germany) Ellen Lohr	Mercedes C-Class	(Germany) Persson Motorsport	1:51.145	23
24	13	(Italy) Gianni Giudici	Opel Calibra V6 4x4	(Italy) Giudici Motorsport	1:53.655	24
25	17	(Germany) Volker Strycek	Opel Calibra V6 4x4	(Germany) Zakspeed Opel	1:54.292	25

=== Race 1 ===
Pos.	No.	Driver	Car	Team	Laps	Time/Retired	Grid	Points
1	5	(Italy) Nicola Larini	Alfa Romeo 155 V6 TI	(Italy) Martini Alfa Corse	20	37:08.987	1	20
2	1	(Germany) Bernd Schneider	Mercedes C-Class	(Germany) D2 Mercedes-AMG	20	+0.677	2	15
3	14	(Italy) Giancarlo Fisichella	Alfa Romeo 155 V6 TI	(Italy) TV Spielfilm Alfa Corse	20	+18.813	3	12
4	2	(United Kingdom) Dario Franchitti	Mercedes C-Class	(Germany) D2 Mercedes-AMG	20	+19.179	13	10
5	44	(Germany) Hans-Joachim Stuck	Opel Calibra V6 4x4	(Germany) Team Rosberg Opel	20	+38.362	19	8
6	25	(Austria) Alexander Wurz	Opel Calibra V6 4x4	(Germany) Joest Racing Opel	20	+38.804	7	6
7	16	(Germany) Uwe Alzen	Opel Calibra V6 4x4	(Germany) Zakspeed Opel	20	+46.252	5	4
8	12	(Denmark) Kurt Thiim	Mercedes C-Class	(Germany) UPS Mercedes-AMG	20	+49.709	12	3
9	43	(Finland) JJ Lehto	Opel Calibra V6 4x4	(Germany) Team Rosberg Opel	20	+50.265	11	2
10	24	(France) Yannick Dalmas	Opel Calibra V6 4x4	(Germany) Joest Racing Opel	20	+51.304	20	1
11	6	(Italy) Alessandro Nannini	Alfa Romeo 155 V6 TI	(Italy) Martini Alfa Corse	20	+51.547	4	
12	15	(Germany) Christian Danner	Alfa Romeo 155 V6 TI	(Italy) TV Spielfilm Alfa Corse	20	+51.668	9	
13	18	(Italy) Gabriele Tarquini	Alfa Romeo 155 V6 TI	(Italy) JAS Motorsport Alfa Romeo	20	+53.140	6	
14	19	(Denmark) Jason Watt	Alfa Romeo 155 V6 TI	(Italy) Bosch JAS Motorsport Alfa Romeo	20	+53.842	18	
15	21	(Germany) Alexander Grau	Mercedes C-Class	(Germany) Persson Motorsport	20	+1:03.938	22	
16	22	(Germany) Ellen Lohr	Mercedes C-Class	(Germany) Persson Motorsport	20	+1:14.227	23	
17	8	(United Kingdom) Oliver Gavin	Opel Calibra V6 4x4	(Germany) Joest Racing Opel	20	+1:20.577	17	
18	7	(Germany) Manuel Reuter	Opel Calibra V6 4x4	(Germany) Joest Racing Opel	20	+1:33.848	10	
19	17	(Germany) Volker Strycek	Opel Calibra V6 4x4	(Germany) Joest Racing Opel	19	+1 lap	25	
20	10	(Germany) Michael Bartels	Alfa Romeo 155 V6 TI	(Italy) Jägermeister JAS Motorsport Alfa Romeo	19	+1 lap	14	
NC	11	(Germany) Jörg van Ommen	Mercedes C-Class	(Germany) UPS Mercedes-AMG	15	+5 laps	8	
Ret	13	(Italy) Gianni Giudici	Opel Calibra V6 4x4	(Italy) Giudici Motorsport	14	Retired	24	
Ret	3	(Denmark) Jan Magnussen	Mercedes C-Class	(Germany) Warsteiner Mercedes-AMG	5	Retired	16	
Ret	9	(Italy) Stefano Modena	Alfa Romeo 155 V6 TI	(Italy) JAS Motorsport Alfa Romeo	3	Retired	15	
Ret	4	(Germany) Bernd Mayländer	Mercedes C-Class	(Germany) Warsteiner Mercedes-AMG	3	Retired	21	

=== Race 2 ===
Pos.	No.	Driver	Car	Team	Laps	Time/Retired	Grid	Points
1	1	(Germany) Bernd Schneider	Mercedes C-Class	(Germany) D2 Mercedes-AMG	20	36:53.313	2	20
2	2	(United Kingdom) Dario Franchitti	Mercedes C-Class	(Germany) D2 Mercedes-AMG	20	+8.730	4	15
3	16	(Germany) Uwe Alzen	Opel Calibra V6 4x4	(Germany) Zakspeed Opel	20	+24.484	6	12
4	12	(Denmark) Kurt Thiim	Mercedes C-Class	(Germany) UPS Mercedes-AMG	20	+31.534	8	10
5	3	(Denmark) Jan Magnussen	Mercedes C-Class	(Germany) Warsteiner Mercedes-AMG	20	+37.886	23	8
6	18	(Italy) Gabriele Tarquini	Alfa Romeo 155 V6 TI	(Italy) JAS Motorsport Alfa Romeo	20	+40.506	13	6
7	7	(Germany) Manuel Reuter	Opel Calibra V6 4x4	(Germany) Joest Racing Opel	20	+41.183	18	4
8	11	(Germany) Jörg van Ommen	Mercedes C-Class	(Germany) UPS Mercedes-AMG	20	+41.620	21	3
9	25	(Austria) Alexander Wurz	Opel Calibra V6 4x4	(Germany) Joest Racing Opel	20	+41.848	6	2
10	24	(France) Yannick Dalmas	Opel Calibra V6 4x4	(Germany) Joest Racing Opel	20	+43.574	10	1
11	21	(Germany) Alexander Grau	Mercedes C-Class	(Germany) Persson Motorsport	20	+53.940	15	
12	22	(Germany) Ellen Lohr	Mercedes C-Class	(Germany) Persson Motorsport	20	+1:21.177	16	
13	14	(Italy) Giancarlo Fisichella	Alfa Romeo 155 V6 TI	(Italy) TV Spielfilm Alfa Corse	20	+1:25.012	3	
14	9	(Italy) Stefano Modena	Alfa Romeo 155 V6 TI	(Italy) JAS Motorsport Alfa Romeo	20	+1:39.092	24	
15	43	(Finland) JJ Lehto	Opel Calibra V6 4x4	(Germany) Team Rosberg Opel	18	Retired	9	
16	44	(Germany) Hans-Joachim Stuck	Opel Calibra V6 4x4	(Germany) Team Rosberg Opel	18	Retired	5	
Ret	15	(Germany) Christian Danner	Alfa Romeo 155 V6 TI	(Italy) TV Spielfilm Alfa Corse	13	Retired	12	
Ret	4	(Germany) Bernd Mayländer	Mercedes C-Class	(Germany) Warsteiner Mercedes-AMG	11	Retired	25	
Ret	6	(Italy) Alessandro Nannini	Alfa Romeo 155 V6 TI	(Italy) Martini Alfa Corse	10	Retired	11	
Ret	13	(Italy) Gianni Giudici	Opel Calibra V6 4x4	(Italy) Giudici Motorsport	9	Retired	22	
Ret	17	(Germany) Volker Strycek	Opel Calibra V6 4x4	(Germany) Zakspeed Opel	6	Retired	19	
Ret	8	(United Kingdom) Oliver Gavin	Opel Calibra V6 4x4	(Germany) Joest Racing Opel	2	Retired	17	
Ret	5	(Italy) Nicola Larini	Alfa Romeo 155 V6 TI	(Italy) Martini Alfa Corse	1	Retired	1	
Ret	19	(Denmark) Jason Watt	Alfa Romeo 155 V6 TI	(Italy) Bosch JAS Motorsport Alfa Romeo	1	Retired	14	
DNS	10	(Germany) Michael Bartels	Alfa Romeo 155 V6 TI	(Italy) Jägermeister JAS Motorsport Alfa Romeo		Did not start	20	

== Standings after the event ==
Drivers' Championship standings

	Pos	Driver	Points
2	1	(Germany) Bernd Schneider	165
1	2	(Germany) Manuel Reuter	163
2	3	(United Kingdom) Dario Franchitti	146
2	4	(Italy) Alessandro Nannini	137
1	5	(Finland) JJ Lehto	126

Manufacturers' Championship standings

Pos	Driver	Points
1	(Germany) Opel	284
2	(Italy) Alfa Romeo	252
3	(Germany) Mercedes	230

- Note: Only the top five positions are included for both sets of drivers' standings.
