= Ellen Lohr =

German racing driver (born 1965)

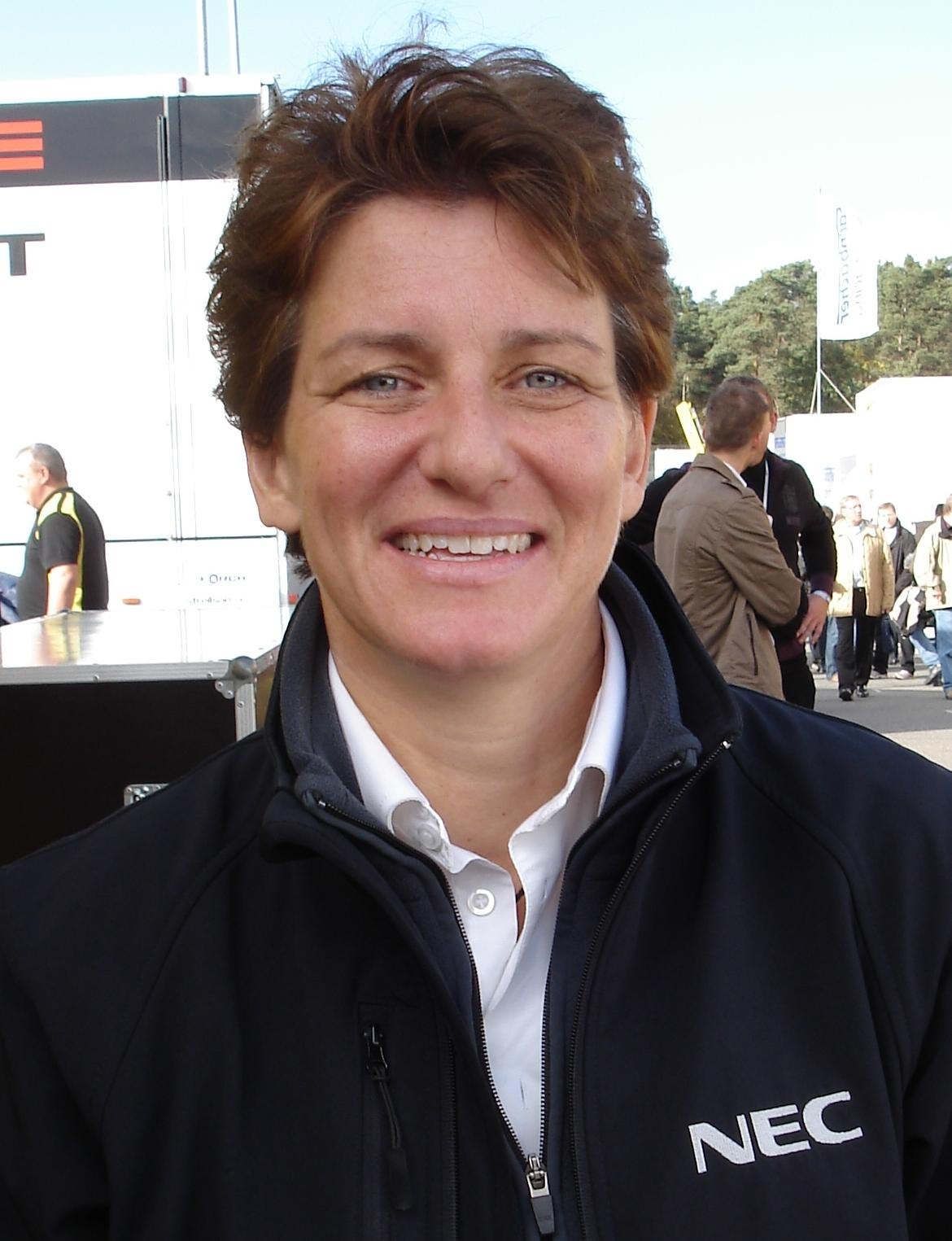
- Lohr in 2009
- Nationality: (Germany) German
- Born: 12 April 1965 (age 61) Mönchengladbach, West Germany

NASCAR Whelen Euro Series career
- Debut season: 2019
- Current team: Dexwet-df1 Racing
- Categorisation: FIA Silver
- Car number: 99
- Engine: Chevrolet
- Starts: 9
- Wins: 0
- Poles: 0
- Fastest laps: 0
- Best finish: 25th in 2019
- Finished last season: 25th in 2019

DTM career
- Debut season: 1987
- Teams: Alpina, AMG-Mercedes, Zakspeed
- Starts: 110
- Wins: 1
- Podiums: 5
- Poles: 1
- Fastest laps: 1
- Best finish: 10th in 1993

Ellen Lohr (born 12 April 1965 in Mönchengladbach) is a German race car driver. She currently competes in the NASCAR Whelen Euro Series, driving the No. 99 Chevrolet Camaro for Dexwet-df1 Racing in the Elite 1 class.

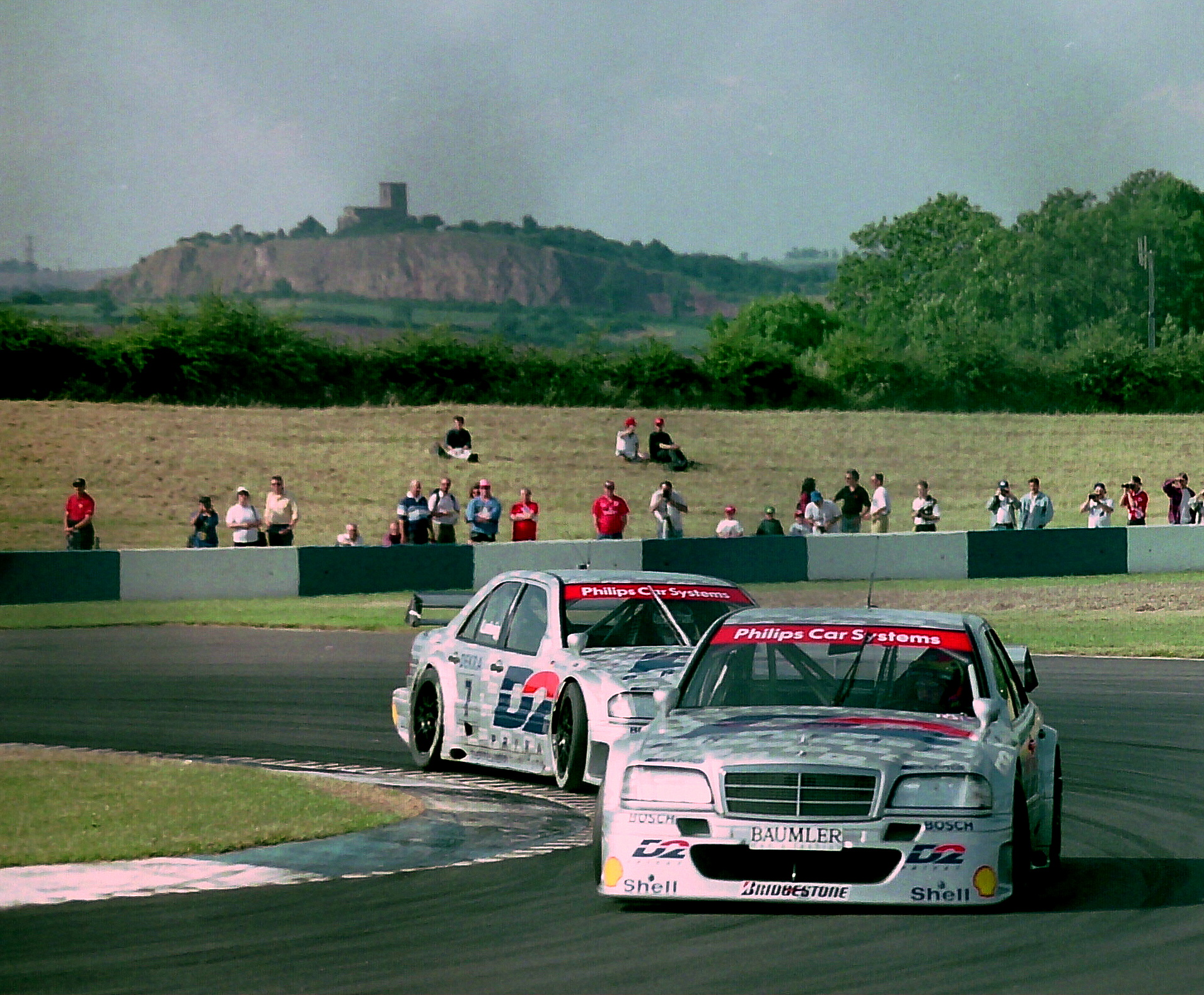
Ellen Lohr - AMG-Mercedes C Klasse leads teammate Klaus Ludwig at Melbourne Hairpin, 1994 DTM, Donington Park.

Lohr is one of Germany's most accomplished female drivers, having won a DTM (German Touring Car Masters) race, on 24 May 1992 in a Mercedes 190E 2.5-16 Evo2 on the Hockenheimring. Lohr is currently the only female driver to have won a DTM race.

When the DTM/ITC series was discontinued in 1996, Lohr moved to truck racing and also competed in the Deutsche Tourenwagen Challenge (DTC), a German touring car racing series. From 2004, she competed in the Dakar Rally and similar events. She is an occasional television commentator for DTM races.

In 2008, Lohr competed in the German Rally Championship, the Deutsche Rally Meisterschaft, with Antonia Roissard de Bellet as her navigator. They also entered the 2008 Central Europe Rally (part of the Dakar Series).

After her initial retirement in 2016, Lohr worked in Formula E in the marketing department of the Venturi race team in 2017. She returned to full-time competition in 2019 after she signed a contract with Dexwet-df1 Racing to compete in the NASCAR Whelen Euro Series in the No. 99 team. She had previously spectated the 2018 season finale at Zolder and expressed interests to compete in the series after spectating the race.

== Racing record ==
=== 24 Hours of Nürburgring results ===
Year	Team	Co-Drivers	Car	Class	Laps	Pos.	Class Pos.
1987	(Germany) BMW Motorsport GmbH (Germany) Schnitzer BMW Team	(Germany) Annette Meeuvissen (Austria) Mercedes Stermitz	BMW M3	Class 8	9	DNF	DNF
1988	(Germany) Auto Budde Team	(Germany) Dieter Schäfer (Germany) Rainer Teitscheid	BMW 325i	Class 9	125	11th	**3rd**
1990	(Germany) Linder M Team	(Germany) Norbert Haug (Belgium) Jean-Michel Martin (Denmark) Kris Nissen	BMW M3	Class 13	137	**2nd**	**2nd**
1999	(Germany) Carlsson Racing	(Switzerland) Florence Duez (Germany) Claudia Hürtgen (Germany) Jutta Kleinschmidt	Mercedes-Benz SLK	Si2	131	7th	**1st**
2000	(Germany) Sakura 2000	(Belgium) Vanina Ickx (Germany) Sabine Schmitz (Italy) Tamara Vidali	Honda S2000	A7	64	DNF	DNF
2001	(Germany) Sakura 2000	(Germany) Jo Albig (Sweden) Ingvar Carlsson (Germany) Claudia Hürtgen	Honda S2000	A3	132	9th	**1st**
2004	(Germany) Notifier-Fire Racing Team	(Germany) Holger Hesse (Germany) Wolfgang Kaufmann (Germany) Michel Vaillant	Chrysler Crossfire	A8	3	DNF	DNF
2005	(Germany) Carlsson Racing	(Germany) Rainer Brückner (Germany) Ralf Schall (Germany) Frank Steinmeier	Mercedes-Benz SLK 350	A6	31	DNF	DNF
2006		(Germany) Werner Habermehl (Germany) Dietrich Hueck (Germany) Tom Schwister	Alfa Romeo 147 JTD	S2	95	DNF	DNF
2007		(Germany) Frank Diefenbacher (Germany) Dietrich Hueck (Germany) Hubert Nacken	Alfa Romeo 147 d	S2	86	81st	**1st**
2008		(Germany) Hubert Nacken (Germany) Martin Richter (Germany) Christian Vogler	Alfa Romeo 147	S2	34	DNF	DNF

=== Complete Deutsche Tourenwagen Meisterschaft results ===
(key) (Races in bold indicate pole position) (Races in italics indicate fastest lap)

Year	Team	Car	1	2	3	4	5	6	7	8	9	10	11	12	13	14	15	16	17	18	19	20	21	22	23	24	Pos.	Pts
1987	Alpina	BMW M3	HOC	ZOL	NÜR	AVU	MFA	NOR	NÜR; Ret	WUN; 5	DIE	SAL; 2															19th	32
1991	AMG Motorenbau GmbH	Mercedes 190E 2.5-16 Evo2	ZOL; 1; 13	ZOL; 2 Ret	HOC; 1; 27	HOC; 2; 15	NÜR; 1; 13	NÜR; 2; 10	AVU; 1; 16	AVU; 2 Ret	WUN; 1; 13	WUN; 2 Ret	NOR; 1 DNQ	NOR; 2 DNQ	DIE; 1; 13	DIE; 2; 21	NÜR; 1; 14	NÜR; 2; 10	ALE; 1; 11	ALE; 2 Ret	HOC; 1 Ret	HOC; 2 DNS	BRN; 1; 14	BRN; 2; 11	DON; 1 Ret	DON; 2; 12	28th	2
1992	AMG Motorenbau GmbH	Mercedes 190E 2.5-16 Evo2	ZOL; 1; 13	ZOL; 2; 15	NÜR; 1; 19	NÜR; 2 Ret	WUN; 1 Ret	WUN; 2; 9	AVU; 1; 8	AVU; 2; 2	HOC; 1; 1	**HOC**; **2** Ret	NÜR; 1; 13	NÜR; 2; 13	NOR; 1; 3	NOR; 2; 6	BRN; 1 Ret	BRN; 2; 7	DIE; 1; 7	DIE; 2; 4	ALE; 1; 8	ALE; 2; 5	NÜR; 1; 6	NÜR; 2; 6	HOC; 1 Ret	HOC; 2; 6	11th	105
1993	AMG-Mercedes Berlin 2000	Mercedes 190E 2.5-16 Evo2	ZOL; 1; 6	ZOL; 2; 8	HOC; 1 Ret	HOC; 2; 7	NÜR; 1; 7	NÜR; 2 Ret	WUN; 1 Ret	WUN; 2 Ret																	10th	43
1993	AMG-Mercedes Berlin 2000	Mercedes 190E 2.5-16 93									NÜR; 1; 11	NÜR; 2 Ret	NOR; 1; 6	NOR; 2 Ret	DON; 1; 8	DON; 2 Ret	DIE; 1; 4	DIE; 2; 4	ALE; 1; 11	ALE; 2 Ret	AVU; 1 Ret	AVU; 2 Ret	HOC; 1 Ret	HOC; 2 Ret			10th	43
1994	AMG Mercedes D2 Privat Team	Mercedes C-Class V6	ZOL; 1; 5	ZOL; 2; 6	HOC; 1; 7	HOC; 2; 7	NÜR; 1; 10	NÜR; 2; 9	MUG; 1 Ret	MUG; 2 Ret	NÜR; 1; 12	NÜR; 2 Ret	NOR; 1; 7	NOR; 2; 6	DON; 1; 6	DON; 2 Ret	DIE; 1; 6	DIE; 2; 3	NÜR; 1; 7	NÜR; 2; 8	AVU; 1; 7	AVU; 2 Ret	ALE; 1; 11	ALE; 2; 9	HOC; 1; 9	HOC; 2; 5	11th	76
1995	Zakspeed Mercedes	Mercedes C-Class V6	HOC; 1; 12	HOC; 2 Ret	AVU; 1 Ret	AVU; 2; 5	NOR; 1; 11	NOR; 2 Ret	DIE; 1; 10	DIE; 2; 9	NÜR; 1; 8	NÜR; 2; 5	ALE; 1 Ret	ALE; 2; 7	HOC; 1; 11	HOC; 2 Ret											17th	18

=== Complete International Touring Car Championship results ===
(key) (Races in bold indicate pole position) (Races in italics indicate fastest lap)

Year	Team	Car	1	2	3	4	5	6	7	8	9	10	11	12	13	14	15	16	17	18	19	20	21	22	23	24	25	26	Pos.	Pts
1995	Zakspeed Mercedes	Mercedes C-Class V6	MUG; 1; 10	MUG; 2 Ret	HEL; 1 Ret	HEL; 2; 5	DON; 1 Ret	DON; 2; 10	EST; 1; 9	EST; 2; 10	MAG; 1; 15†	MAG; 2 Ret																	17th	13
1996	Persson Motorsport	Mercedes C-Class	HOC; 1; 9	HOC; 2 Ret	NÜR; 1; 15	NÜR; 2; 11	EST; 1 Ret	EST; 2 Ret	HEL; 1; 15	HEL; 2; 8	NOR; 1; 14	NOR; 2; 9	DIE; 1; 21	DIE; 2; 13	SIL; 1; 20	SIL; 2; 12	NÜR; 1; 20	NÜR; 2; 21	MAG; 1 Ret	MAG; 2; 14	MUG; 1; 16	MUG; 2; 12	HOC; 1; 11	HOC; 2; 11	INT; 1; 18†	INT; 2; 13	SUZ; 1; 21	SUZ; 2 Ret	25th	7

- † — Retired, but was classified as she completed 90% of the winner's race distance.

=== Complete NASCAR results ===
==== Whelen Euro Series – Elite 1 ====
NASCAR Whelen Euro Series – Elite 1 results
Year	Team	No.	Make	1	2	3	4	5	6	7	8	9	10	11	12	13	NWES	Pts
2019	Dexwet-df1 Racing	99	Chevy	VAL; 23	VAL; 28	FRA; 21	FRA; 14	BRH; 22	BRH; 23	MOS; 14	MOS; 15	VEN; 20	HOC	HOC	ZOL	ZOL	25th	148

== See also ==
- Sabine Schmitz
- Claudia Hürtgen
- Jutta Kleinschmidt
