= 1993 Deutsche Tourenwagen Meisterschaft =

German touring car championship season

Seasons
- ← 1992 1994 →

The 1993 Deutsche Tourenwagen Meisterschaft was the tenth season of premier German touring car championship and also eighth season under the moniker of Deutsche Tourenwagen Meisterschaft. It was the first DTM to utilize FIA Class 1 Touring Cars regulations which limited engines to a maximum of six cylinders and 2.5 litres capacity, but allowed liberal modifications to engine, chassis and aerodynamics. Italian driver Nicola Larini won the championship for Alfa Corse after scoring 11 wins (series record) ahead of Roland Asch and Bernd Schneider, both driving for the AMG-Mercedes team.

== Teams and drivers ==
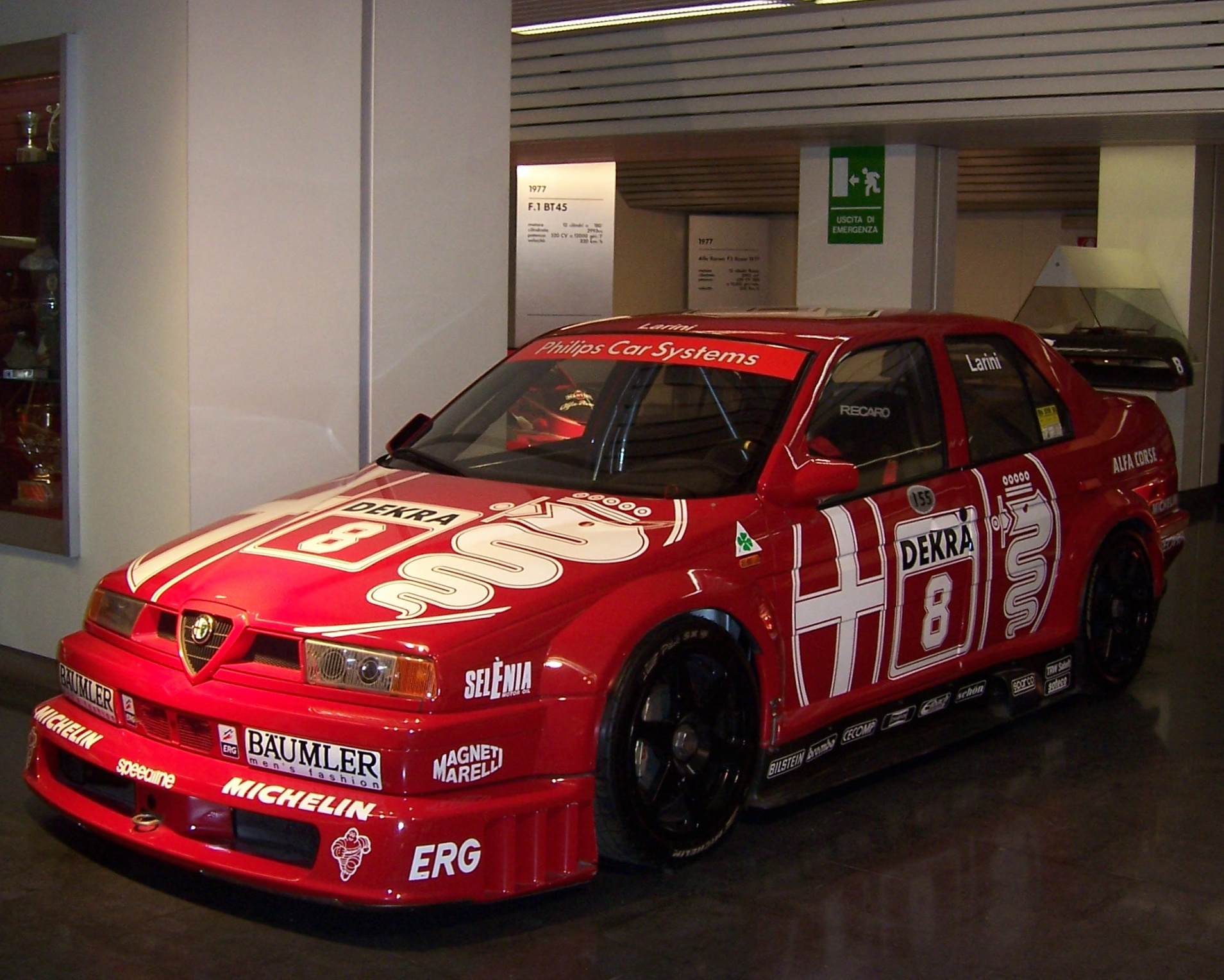
Alfa Romeo 155 V6 TI DTM as driven by 1993 DTM champion Nicola Larini

Manufacturer	Car	Team	No.	Drivers	Rounds
Mercedes-Benz	Mercedes 190E 2.5-16 Evo II; Mercedes 190E Class 1	(Germany) AMG-Mercedes	1	(Germany) Klaus Ludwig	All*
Mercedes-Benz	Mercedes 190E 2.5-16 Evo II; Mercedes 190E Class 1	(Germany) AMG-Mercedes	2	(Germany) Ellen Lohr	All*
Mercedes-Benz	Mercedes 190E 2.5-16 Evo II; Mercedes 190E Class 1	(Germany) Zakspeed	3	(Denmark) Kurt Thiim	All*
Mercedes-Benz	Mercedes 190E 2.5-16 Evo II; Mercedes 190E Class 1	(Germany) Zakspeed	4	(Germany) Jörg van Ommen	All*
Opel	Opel Calibra V6 4x4	(Germany) Joest Racing	5	(Germany) Manuel Reuter	10
Opel	Opel Calibra V6 4x4	(Germany) Joest Racing	6	(Finland) Keke Rosberg	10
Alfa Romeo	Alfa Romeo 155 V6 Ti	(Italy) Alfa Corse	7	(Italy) Alessandro Nannini	All*
Alfa Romeo	Alfa Romeo 155 V6 Ti	(Italy) Alfa Corse	8	(Italy) Nicola Larini	All*
BMW	BMW M3 Sport Evolution	(Germany) Linder Motorsport	10	(Germany) Harald Becker	All*
Mercedes-Benz	Mercedes 190E 2.5-16 Evo II; Mercedes 190E Class 1	(Germany) AMG-Mercedes	11	(Germany) Bernd Schneider	All*
Mercedes-Benz	Mercedes 190E 2.5-16 Evo II; Mercedes 190E Class 1	(Germany) AMG-Mercedes	12	(Germany) Roland Asch	All*
Ford	Ford Mustang GT	(Austria) Challenger Auto Racing	13	(Germany) Jürgen Feucht	All*
Alfa Romeo	Alfa Romeo 155 V6 Ti	(Germany) Schübel Engineering	14	(Germany) Christian Danner	All*
Alfa Romeo	Alfa Romeo 155 V6 Ti	(Germany) Schübel Engineering	15	(Italy) Giorgio Francia	All*
Mercedes-Benz	Mercedes 190E 2.5-16 Evo II	(Germany) Persson Motorsport	16	(Germany) Uwe Alzen	1-7, 9-10*
Mercedes-Benz	Mercedes 190E 2.5-16 Evo II	(Germany) Persson Motorsport	17	(Germany) Olaf Manthey	All*
BMW	BMW M3 Sport Evolution	(Germany) Auto Maass	18	(Germany) Kurt König	1-8, 10*
Mercedes-Benz	Mercedes 190E 2.5-16 Evo II	(Germany) DTM Junior Team	20	(Germany) Alexander Grau	1-9*
Opel	Opel Omega 3000 24V Evo	(Germany) Kissling Motorsport	22	(Germany) Marco Werner	10
Mercedes-Benz	Mercedes 190E 2.5-16 Evo II	(Germany) DTM Junior Team	23	(Germany) Stig Amthor	All*
Opel	Opel Omega 3000 24V Evo	(Germany) Kissling Motorsport	25	(Germany) Volker Strycek	1-9*
BMW	BMW M3 Sport Evolution	(Czech Republic) Kaucuk Motorsport	32	(Czech Republic) Josef Venc	All*
Mercedes-Benz	Mercedes 190E 2.5-16 Evo II	(Germany) Persson Motorsport	44	(Germany) Markus Oestreich	8
Alfa Romeo	Alfa Romeo 155 TS	(Italy) Scuderia Giudici	51	(Italy) Gianni Giudici	All*
Alfa Romeo	Alfa Romeo 155 TS	(Germany) Engstler Motorsport	52	(Germany) Franz Engstler	5-10*
Opel	Opel Astra 16V	(Germany) Dürkopp Euroent Motorsport	54	(Germany) Marco Werner	1-2, 5, 8
Opel	Opel Astra 16V	(Switzerland) Dellenbach Motorsport	55	(Switzerland) Luigino Pagotto	2, 4, 6-7, 10
Opel	Opel Astra 16V	(Switzerland) Dellenbach Motorsport	59	(Switzerland) Hermann Roth	2-4, 6-7, 10
Vauxhall Motorsport	Vauxhall Cavalier	(Germany) Maxted Motorsport	60	(United Kingdom) Ian Khan	*
BMW	BMW 318i	(United Kingdom) Team Dynamics	61	(United Kingdom) Matt Neal	*
BMW	BMW 318i	(United Kingdom) Pinkney Motorsport	62	(United Kingdom) David Pinkney	*

Numbers from 51 entered the 2000 Cup, drivers with the asterisk took part at Donington non-championship round.

== Schedule and results ==
Round		Country	Circuit	Date	Pole position	Fastest lap	Winning driver	Winning team	Report
1	R1	Belgium	Zolder	4 April	(Italy) Nicola Larini	(Germany) Christian Danner	(Italy) Nicola Larini	Alfa Corse	Report
1	R2	Belgium	Zolder	4 April		(Italy) Nicola Larini	(Italy) Nicola Larini	Alfa Corse	Report
2	R1	Germany	Hockenheimring	18 April	(Italy) Alessandro Nannini	(Italy) Nicola Larini	(Germany) Bernd Schneider	AMG-Mercedes	Report
2	R2	Germany	Hockenheimring	18 April		(Germany) Bernd Schneider	(Germany) Bernd Schneider	AMG-Mercedes	Report
3	R1	Germany	Nürburgring	2 May	(Germany) Bernd Schneider	(Italy) Nicola Larini	(Italy) Nicola Larini	Alfa Corse	Report
3	R2	Germany	Nürburgring	2 May		(Germany) Bernd Schneider	(Germany) Klaus Ludwig	AMG-Mercedes	Report
4	R1	Germany	Wunstorf	16 May	(Italy) Nicola Larini	(Italy) Nicola Larini	(Italy) Nicola Larini	Alfa Corse	Report
4	R2	Germany	Wunstorf	16 May		(Italy) Nicola Larini	(Denmark) Kurt Thiim	Zakspeed	Report
5	R1	Germany	Nürburgring Nordschleife	10 June	(Germany) Jörg van Ommen	(Germany) Klaus Ludwig	(Italy) Nicola Larini	Alfa Corse	Report
5	R2	Germany	Nürburgring Nordschleife	10 June		(Italy) Nicola Larini	(Italy) Nicola Larini	Alfa Corse	Report
6	R1	Germany	Norisring	27 June	(Denmark) Kurt Thiim	(Italy) Nicola Larini	(Italy) Nicola Larini	Alfa Corse	Report
6	R2	Germany	Norisring	27 June		(Italy) Nicola Larini	(Italy) Nicola Larini	Alfa Corse	Report
NC	R1	(United Kingdom) Great Britain	Donington Park	18 July	(Germany) Christian Danner	(Italy) Alessandro Nannini	(Germany) Christian Danner	Schübel	Report
NC	R2	(United Kingdom) Great Britain	Donington Park	18 July		(Italy) Nicola Larini	(Italy) Nicola Larini	Alfa Corse	Report
7	R1	Germany	Diepholz Airfield Circuit	8 August	(Germany) Bernd Schneider	(Germany) Bernd Schneider	(Germany) Roland Asch	AMG-Mercedes	Report
7	R2	Germany	Diepholz Airfield Circuit	8 August		(Italy) Nicola Larini	(Italy) Nicola Larini	Alfa Corse	Report
8	R1	Germany	Alemannenring	29 August	(Italy) Nicola Larini	(Germany) Bernd Schneider	(Italy) Nicola Larini	Alfa Corse	Report
8	R2	Germany	Alemannenring	29 August		(Germany) Christian Danner	(Germany) Bernd Schneider	AMG-Mercedes	Report
9	R1	Germany	AVUS	12 September	(Italy) Alessandro Nannini	(Italy) Alessandro Nannini	(Germany) Roland Asch	AMG-Mercedes	Report
9	R2	Germany	AVUS	12 September		(Italy) Nicola Larini	(Germany) Roland Asch	AMG-Mercedes	Report
10	R1	Germany	Hockenheimring	19 September	(Denmark) Kurt Thiim	(Italy) Nicola Larini	(Italy) Alessandro Nannini	Alfa Corse	Report
10	R2	Germany	Hockenheimring	19 September		(Germany) Klaus Ludwig	(Italy) Alessandro Nannini	Alfa Corse	Report

Non-Championship race

== Driver standings/results ==
Points system is as follows: 1st=20, 2nd=15, 3rd=12, 4th=10, 5th=8, 6th=6, 7th=4, 8th=3, 9th=2, 10th=1

Pos	Driver	ZOL (Belgium)		HOC1 (Germany)		NÜR1 (Germany)		WUN (Germany)		NÜR2 (Germany)		NOR (Germany)		DON‡ (United Kingdom)		DIE (Germany)		SIN (Germany)		AVU (Germany)		HOC2 (Germany)		Pts
1	(Italy) Nicola Larini	**1**	**1**	9	2	1	**Ret**	**1**	**Ret**	1	**1**	1	**1**	3	1	10	1	**1**	**2**	6	3	4	19	261
2	(Germany) Roland Asch	3	4	2	4	4	3	6	4	7	17	5	2	5	5	1	**5**	Ret	6	1	**1**	6	3	204
3	(Germany) Bernd Schneider	Ret	9	1	**1**	**2**	2	7	6	5	5	Ret	Ret	4	3	**2**	6	2	1	3	23	Ret	6	172
4	(Germany) Klaus Ludwig	4	7	Ret	3	3	1	5	3	2	3	Ret	5	6	Ret	3	2	5	Ret	2	22	5	Ret	171
5	(Germany) Christian Danner	2	2	8	6	6	Ret	4	5	6	2	3	3	**1**	**2**	7	Ret	6	4	4	2	Ret	5	161
6	(Denmark) Kurt Thiim	8	6	3	5	5	5	3	1	9	Ret	**8**	Ret	2	4	5	8	7	5	10	4	**3**	4	138
7	(Italy) Giorgio Francia	7	Ret	6	12	9	Ret	Ret	2	8	6	4	8	7	6	6	3	4	3	Ret	5	2	2	127
8	(Italy) Alessandro Nannini	Ret	3	**13**	8	10	4	2	Ret	4	4	Ret	Ret	Ret	DNS	Ret	18	3	Ret	**5**	Ret	1	**1**	121
9	(Germany) Jörg van Ommen	5	5	4	10	8	Ret	11	Ret	**3**	Ret	2	4	Ret	9	9	11	Ret	8	8	10	Ret	7	80
10	(Germany) Ellen Lohr	6	8	Ret	7	7	Ret	Ret	Ret	11	Ret	6	Ret	8	Ret	4	4	11	Ret	Ret	Ret	Ret	Ret	43
11	(Germany) Uwe Alzen	Ret	11	5	9	Ret	DNS	9	9	23	12	7	7	9	7	8	7			7	7	8	Ret	40
12	(Germany) Olaf Manthey	Ret	10	Ret	11	Ret	DNS	8	7	10	7	9	6	10	8	Ret	Ret	10	7	17	8	9	8	34
13	(Germany) Alexander Grau	9	12	11	14	12	7	10	Ret	Ret	DNS	Ret	Ret	11	10	11	9	9	9	9	6			21
14	(Germany) Harald Becker	12	Ret	12	15	11	6	NC	8	13	18	11	9	Ret	DNS	13	Ret	Ret	DNS	14	9	12	9	15
15	(Germany) Stig Amthor	10	13	10	13	18	9	Ret	10	12	8	Ret	10	13	11	15	10	16	Ret	Ret	14	10	Ret	11
16	(Germany) Kurt König	11	14	7	Ret	Ret	8	Ret	DNS	14	11	Ret	DNS	Ret	DNS	12	Ret	22	DNS			13	Ret	7
17	(Germany) Markus Oestreich																	8	10					4
18	(Finland) Keke Rosberg																					7	Ret	4
19	(Germany) Volker Strycek	14	16	Ret	DNS	Ret	Ret	12	Ret	20	9	Ret	11	12	12	14	13	13	11	13	11			2
20	(Czech Republic) Josef Venc	17	21	19	19	17	10	13	Ret	16	14	Ret	13	14	13	Ret	Ret	20	17	12	12	Ret	DNS	1
21	(Germany) Armin Hahne									25	10	Ret	DNS	Ret	Ret	Ret	DNS			Ret	Ret	Ret	DNS	1
22	(Germany) Gerd Ruch	Ret	DNS	18	Ret	14	11	14	13	DNS	DNS	10	12	22	Ret	Ret	15	Ret	15	11	Ret	Ret	DNS	1
23	(Germany) Marco Werner	Ret	DNS	Ret	DNS					Ret	DNS							Ret	DNS			11	10	1
24	(Italy) Achille Voltolina	16	22	17	Ret	21	14	16	11			15	17	19	17	20	16			22	24	16	14	0
25	(Germany) Jürgen Ruch	Ret	Ret	Ret	DNS	Ret	DNS	DNS	DNS			DNQ	Ret	23	15	Ret	Ret	Ret	DNS	Ret	21	Ret	11	0
26	(Germany) Georg Severich	Ret	18	Ret	DNS	13	12	Ret	DNS	15	13	Ret	DNS	18	16	Ret	DNS	15	13	20	Ret	Ret	13	0
27	(Czech Republic) Vaclav Bervid	Ret	19	15	Ret	16	Ret	17	12	17	21	Ret	16	15	Ret	17	Ret	14	Ret	15	15	Ret	DNS	0
28	(Germany) German Tauber	13	15	14	16	15	Ret	Ret	DNS	Ret	DNS	12	14	16	DNS	Ret	DNS	21	Ret	18	18	Ret	12	0
29	(Germany) Marc Gindorf									Ret	DNS	Ret	DNS			16	12	12	Ret	Ret	16	15	20	0
30	(Germany) Armin Bernhard											Ret	DNS			19	14	17	12	Ret	DNS	Ret	DNS	0
31	(Germany) Carsten Struwe	15	17	Ret	17	19	Ret	15	Ret	Ret	19	13	Ret							Ret	13	Ret	Ret	0
32	(Austria) Wolfgang Lackinger			Ret	Ret	20	13	Ret	DNS	19	DNS	14	15	17	14									0
33	(Germany) Jürgen Feucht	Ret	Ret	20	Ret	22	Ret	19	14	Ret	DNS	Ret	DNS	Ret	Ret	18	Ret	Ret	Ret	Ret	DNS	Ret	Ret	0
34	(Austria) Hermann Duller															21	Ret	19	14	16	17	18	15	0
35	(Italy) Gianni Giudici	Ret	Ret	Ret	21	25	Ret	21	15	22	16			24	22	NC	Ret					14	Ret	0
36	(Germany) Werner Lenk	Ret	20	16	18	Ret	15	18	Ret	DNS	DNS	Ret	DNS					Ret	DNS	21	20	17	16	0
37	(Germany) Axel Göbel									18	15													0
38	(Czech Republic) Václav Švarc	Ret	23	Ret	DNS	23	16	Ret	DNS	24	DNS	DNQ	Ret											0
39	(Germany) Franz Engstler									21	20	DNQ	18	20	20	Ret	17	18	16	19	19	19	17	0
40	(Switzerland) Hermann Roth			Ret	Ret	24	Ret	23	Ret			DNQ	19			22	Ret					20	18	0
41	(Switzerland) Luigino Pagotto			21	20			22	Ret			DNQ	Ret			NC	Ret					21	Ret	0
42	(Germany) Ralf Kludt							20	Ret															0
–	(Germany) Andreas Henningsen	Ret	DNS																					0
–	(Germany) Josef Bröhling									Ret	DNS													0
–	(Germany) Marco Munding															Ret	DNS							0
–	(Germany) Manuel Reuter																					Ret	DNS	0
–	(Germany) Heinz-Harald Frentzen																					DNS	DNS	0
–	(United Kingdom) Ian Khan													21	18									0†
–	(United Kingdom) Matt Neal													Ret	19									0†
–	(United Kingdom) David Pinkney													NC	21									0†
Pos	Driver	ZOL (Belgium)		HOC1 (Germany)		NÜR1 (Germany)		WUN (Germany)		NÜR2 (Germany)		NOR (Germany)		DON‡ (United Kingdom)		DIE (Germany)		SIN (Germany)		AVU (Germany)		HOC2 (Germany)		Pts

Colour	Result
Gold	Winner
Silver	Second place
Bronze	Third place
Green	Points classification
Blue	Non-points classification
Blue	Non-classified finish (NC)
Purple	Retired, not classified (Ret)
Red	Did not qualify (DNQ)
Red	Did not pre-qualify (DNPQ)
Black	Disqualified (DSQ)
White	Did not start (DNS)
White	Withdrew (WD)
White	Race cancelled (C)
Blank	Did not practice (DNP)
Blank	Did not arrive (DNA)
Blank	Excluded (EX)

**Bold** – Pole
Italics – Fastest Lap

† Not classified in championship due to only entering in non-championship event.

‡ Non-championship event.

== Bibliography ==
- Voigt, Thomas (1993). Tourenwagen Story '93: Die Rennen, die Fahrer, die Technik (in German). Berlin: Sportverlag Berlin. ISBN 978-3-328-00620-6.
- Osterroth, Jochen von (1993). Das offizielle DTM-Jahrbuch 1993 (in German). Essen: Klartext Verlag. ISBN 978-3-88474-068-2.
