= 1994 Deutsche Tourenwagen Meisterschaft =

1994 touring car series in Germany

Seasons
- ← 1993 1995 →

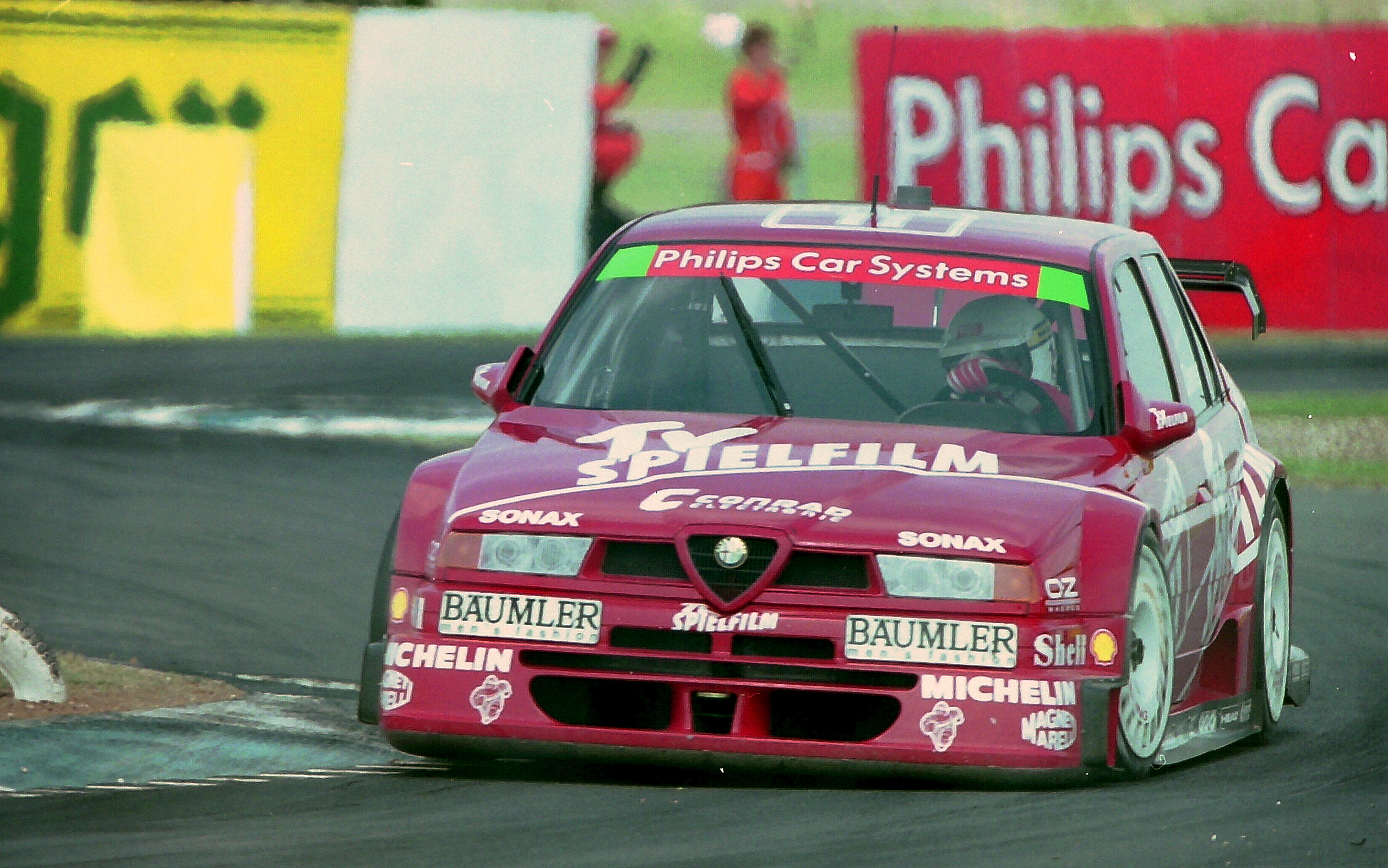
Christian Danner -Schubel Engineering - Alfa Romeo 155 V6 TI 94 exits The Esses, Donington Park, UK.

The 1994 Deutsche Tourenwagen Meisterschaft was the eleventh season of premier German touring car championship and also ninth season under the moniker of Deutsche Tourenwagen Meisterschaft. The season had ten rounds with two races each; two additional rounds were held outside Germany but these did not count towards the championship.

The winner was Klaus Ludwig in Mercedes C-Class V6 with 222 points.

== Teams and drivers ==
| Manufacturer | Car | Team | No. | Drivers | Rounds |
|---|---|---|---|---|---|
| Alfa Romeo | Alfa Romeo 155 V6 TI | (Italy) Alfa Corse | 0 | (United States) Danny Sullivan | NC1, NC2 |
| Alfa Romeo | Alfa Romeo 155 V6 TI | (Italy) Alfa Corse | 1 | (Italy) Nicola Larini | All |
| Alfa Romeo | Alfa Romeo 155 V6 TI | (Italy) Alfa Corse | 2 | (Italy) Alessandro Nannini | All |
| Alfa Romeo | Alfa Romeo 155 V6 TI | (Italy) Alfa Corse | 10 | (Italy) Stefano Modena | 15–20 |
| Alfa Romeo | Alfa Romeo 155 V6 TI | (Italy) Alfa Corse | 33 | (Italy) Stefano Buttiero | 1–14 |
| Alfa Romeo | Alfa Romeo 155 V6 TI | (Germany) Schübel Engineering | 11 | (Germany) Christian Danner | All |
| Alfa Romeo | Alfa Romeo 155 V6 TI | (Germany) Schübel Engineering | 12 | (Italy) Giorgio Francia | All |
| Alfa Romeo | Alfa Romeo 155 V6 TI | (Germany) Schübel Engineering | 18 | (Denmark) Kris Nissen | All |
| Alfa Romeo | Alfa Romeo 155 V6 TI | (Germany) Jägermeister Schübel Engineering | 27 | (Germany) Michael Bartels | 1–20, NC1 |
| Alfa Romeo | Alfa Romeo 155 V6 TI | (Germany) Jägermeister Schübel Engineering | 28 | (United Kingdom) Andy Wallace | 1–10, NC1, NC2 |
| Alfa Romeo | Alfa Romeo 155 V6 TI | (Germany) Engstler Motorsport | 25 | (Germany) Franz Engstler | 1–10, NC1 |
| Alfa Romeo | Alfa Romeo 155 V6 TI | (Germany) Engstler Motorsport | 26 | (Germany) Carsten Struwe | 1–8, NC1 |
| Alfa Romeo | Alfa Romeo 155 V6 TI | (Germany) Engstler Motorsport | 40 | (Germany) Danny Pfeil | 9–10 |
| Alfa Romeo | Alfa Romeo 155 V6 TI | (Italy) Scuderia Giudici | 30 | (Italy) Gianni Giudici | All |
| Alfa Romeo | Alfa Romeo 155 V6 TI | (Germany) Schrey Motorsport | 37 | (Germany) Wolfgang Schrey | 1–2 |
| Mercedes-Benz | Mercedes-Benz C-Class | (Germany) AMG-Mercedes | 3 | (Germany) Roland Asch | All |
| Mercedes-Benz | Mercedes-Benz C-Class | (Germany) AMG-Mercedes | 4 | (Germany) Bernd Schneider | All |
| Mercedes-Benz | Mercedes-Benz C-Class | (Germany) AMG-Mercedes | 7 | (Germany) Klaus Ludwig | All |
| Mercedes-Benz | Mercedes-Benz C-Class | (Germany) AMG-Mercedes | 8 | (Germany) Ellen Lohr | All |
| Mercedes-Benz | Mercedes-Benz C-Class | (Germany) Promarkt Zakspeed Team | 14 | (Denmark) Kurt Thiim | All |
| Mercedes-Benz | Mercedes-Benz C-Class | (Germany) Promarkt Zakspeed Team | 15 | (Germany) Jörg van Ommen | All |
| Mercedes-Benz | Mercedes 190E Class 1 | (Germany) Persson Motorsport | 19 | (Germany) Uwe Alzen | All |
| Mercedes-Benz | Mercedes 190E Class 1 | (Germany) Persson Motorsport | 20 | (Germany) Marc Gindorf | All |
| Mercedes-Benz | Mercedes 190E Class 1 | (Germany) DTM Junior Team | 21 | (Germany) Alexander Grau | All |
| Mercedes-Benz | Mercedes 190E Class 1 | (Germany) DTM Junior Team | 24 | (Germany) Stig Amthor | All |
| Mercedes-Benz | Mercedes 190E 2.5-16 Evo II | (Germany) BAS Motorsport | 31 | (Germany) Armin Bernhard | All |
| Opel | Opel Calibra V6 4×4 | (Germany) Opel Team Joest | 5 | (Germany) Manuel Reuter | All |
| Opel | Opel Calibra V6 4×4 | (Germany) Opel Team Joest | 6 | (Finland) Keke Rosberg | All |
| Opel | Opel Calibra V6 4×4 | (Germany) Opel Team Joest | 17 | (Germany) John Winter | All |
| BMW | BMW M3 E36 | (Germany) Linder Rennsport | 9 | (Germany) Frank Schmickler | All |
| BMW | BMW M3 E36 | (Germany) WS-DHL-Team | 34 | (Germany) Harald Becker | 1–8, NC1 |
| BMW | BMW M3 E36 | (Germany) WS-DHL-Team | 35 | (Germany) Rüdiger Schmitt | 1–6, NC1 |
| BMW | BMW M3 E36 | (Germany) WS-DHL-Team | 39 | (Germany) Georg Severich | 7–20, NC2 |
| BMW | BMW M3 E36 | (Germany) WS-DHL-Team | 41 | (Germany) Fritz Huber | 9–14, 19–20 |
| BMW | BMW M3 E36 | (Germany) WS-DHL-Team | 42 | (New Zealand) Neil Cunningham | NC2 |
| BMW | BMW M3 E36 | (Germany) WS-DHL-Team | 43 | (Germany) Steffen Göpel | 15–16 |
| BMW | BMW M3 E36 | (Germany) WS-DHL-Team | 44 | (Germany) Rüdiger Seyffarth | 17–18 |
| BMW | BMW M3 Sport Evolution | (Germany) Molitor Racing | 38 | (Germany) Karsten Molitor | 7–8 |
| Ford | Ford Mustang | (Germany) Buffalo Boots | 13 | (Germany) Jürgen Feucht | 7–20, NC2 |
| Ford | Ford Mustang | (Germany) Ruch Motorsport | 22 | (Germany) Gerd Ruch | All |
| Ford | Ford Mustang | (Germany) Ruch Motorsport | 23 | (Germany) Jürgen Ruch | All |

== Schedule and results ==
| Round | | Country | Circuit | Date | Pole position | Fastest lap | Winning driver | Winning team | Report |
|---|---|---|---|---|---|---|---|---|---|
| 1 | R1 | Belgium | Zolder | 10 April | (Italy) Nicola Larini | (Italy) Nicola Larini | (Italy) Alessandro Nannini | Alfa Corse | Report |
| 1 | R2 | Belgium | Zolder | 10 April | | (Italy) Alessandro Nannini | (Italy) Alessandro Nannini | Alfa Corse | Report |
| 2 | R1 | Germany | Hockenheimring | 24 April | (Denmark) Kurt Thiim | (Germany) Bernd Schneider | (Denmark) Kurt Thiim | Promarkt Zakspeed Team | Report |
| 2 | R2 | Germany | Hockenheimring | 24 April | | (Germany) Bernd Schneider | (Italy) Alessandro Nannini | Alfa Corse | Report |
| 3 | R1 | Germany | Nürburgring | 8 May | (Germany) Bernd Schneider | (Italy) Nicola Larini | (Germany) Klaus Ludwig | AMG-Mercedes | Report |
| 3 | R2 | Germany | Nürburgring | 8 May | | (Germany) Klaus Ludwig | (Italy) Nicola Larini | Alfa Corse | Report |
| NC | R1 | Italy | Mugello Circuit | 22 May | (Denmark) Kurt Thiim | (Italy) Alessandro Nannini | (Denmark) Kurt Thiim | Promarkt Zakspeed Team | Report |
| NC | R2 | Italy | Mugello Circuit | 22 May | | (Denmark) Kurt Thiim | (Germany) Jörg van Ommen | Promarkt Zakspeed Team | Report |
| 4 | R1 | Germany | Nürburgring | 2 June | (Denmark) Kurt Thiim | (Germany) Roland Asch | (Italy) Alessandro Nannini | Alfa Corse | Report |
| 4 | R2 | Germany | Nürburgring | 2 June | | (Germany) Bernd Schneider | (Germany) Klaus Ludwig | AMG-Mercedes | Report |
| 5 | R1 | Germany | Norisring | 26 June | (Germany) Bernd Schneider | (Italy) Nicola Larini | (Italy) Nicola Larini | Alfa Corse | Report |
| 5 | R2 | Germany | Norisring | 26 June | | (Italy) Nicola Larini | (Denmark) Kris Nissen | Schübel Engineering | Report |
| NC | R1 | (United Kingdom) Great Britain | Donington Park | 17 July | (Denmark) Kurt Thiim | (Italy) Alessandro Nannini | (Italy) Alessandro Nannini | Alfa Corse | Report |
| NC | R2 | (United Kingdom) Great Britain | Donington Park | 17 July | | (Germany) Bernd Schneider | (Germany) Manuel Reuter | Opel Team Joest | Report |
| 6 | R1 | Germany | Diepholz Airfield Circuit | 24 July | (Germany) Bernd Schneider | (Germany) Bernd Schneider | (Germany) Klaus Ludwig | AMG-Mercedes | Report |
| 6 | R2 | Germany | Diepholz Airfield Circuit | 24 July | | (Germany) Roland Asch | (Germany) Bernd Schneider | AMG-Mercedes | Report |
| 7 | R1 | Germany | Nürburgring | 21 August | (Germany) Jörg van Ommen | (Denmark) Kurt Thiim | (Germany) Jörg van Ommen | Promarkt Zakspeed Team | Report |
| 7 | R2 | Germany | Nürburgring | 21 August | | (Germany) Bernd Schneider | (Germany) Jörg van Ommen | Promarkt Zakspeed Team | Report |
| 8 | R1 | Germany | AVUS | 4 September | (Denmark) Kurt Thiim | (Italy) Stefano Modena | (Italy) Stefano Modena | Alfa Corse | Report |
| 8 | R2 | Germany | AVUS | 4 September | | (Italy) Stefano Modena | (Italy) Stefano Modena | Alfa Corse | Report |
| 9 | R1 | Germany | Alemannenring | 18 September | (Italy) Stefano Modena | (Italy) Nicola Larini | (Italy) Nicola Larini | Alfa Corse | Report |
| 9 | R2 | Germany | Alemannenring | 18 September | | (Germany) Manuel Reuter | (Italy) Nicola Larini | Alfa Corse | Report |
| 10 | R1 | Germany | Hockenheimring | 9 October | (Denmark) Kurt Thiim | (Germany) Jörg van Ommen | (Denmark) Kurt Thiim | Promarkt Zakspeed Team | Report |
| 10 | R2 | Germany | Hockenheimring | 9 October | | (Germany) Bernd Schneider | (Germany) Bernd Schneider | AMG-Mercedes | Report |

Non-Championship race

== Drivers Championship standings ==
| Pos | Driver | ZOL (Belgium) | | HOC1 (Germany) | | NÜR1 (Germany) | | MUG‡ (Italy) | | NÜR2 (Germany) | | NOR (Germany) | | DON‡ (United Kingdom) | | DIE (Germany) | | NÜR3 (Germany) | | AVU (Germany) | | SIN (Germany) | | HOC2 (Germany) | | Pts |
|---|---|---|---|---|---|---|---|---|---|---|---|---|---|---|---|---|---|---|---|---|---|---|---|---|---|---|
| 1 | (Germany) Klaus Ludwig | 8 | 5 | 5 | 8 | 1 | **3** | 8 | 17 | 2 | 1 | 3 | 5 | 20 | DNS | 1 | **2** | 2 | 2 | 4 | 8 | Ret | 4 | 2 | 4 | 222 |
| 2 | (Germany) Jörg van Ommen | 4 | 4 | 2 | Ret | 3 | 5 | 2 | 1 | 10 | 2 | 2 | 8 | 8 | 2 | 9 | 10 | **1** | **1** | 6 | 4 | 7 | Ret | 5 | 2 | 175 |
| 3 | (Italy) Nicola Larini | **Ret** | 8 | 3 | DNS | 4 | 1 | 4 | Ret | Ret | Ret | 1 | **2** | 3 | DNS | 3 | Ret | Ret | DNS | 3 | 6 | 1 | **1** | Ret | Ret | 150 |
| 4 | (Italy) Alessandro Nannini | 1 | **1** | 4 | 1 | 7 | 7 | 17 | Ret | 1 | **7** | Ret | 7 | 1 | **DSQ** | 5 | 4 | 8 | 5 | 19 | 5 | Ret | 12 | 6 | Ret | 149 |
| 5 | (Denmark) Kurt Thiim | 6 | Ret | **1** | **2** | 9 | 10 | **1** | **Ret** | **21** | 6 | 4 | 3 | **7** | 3 | 4 | 6 | 11 | 6 | **2** | 3 | Ret | Ret | **1** | **Ret** | 141 |
| 6 | (Germany) Roland Asch | 2 | 2 | Ret | 11 | 12 | 6 | 7 | 4 | 6 | 4 | Ret | DNS | 4 | 8 | 2 | 11 | 4 | 3 | 5 | 2 | 8 | 7 | 8 | 9 | 124 |
| 7 | (Denmark) Kris Nissen | 7 | Ret | 9 | 6 | 5 | 4 | Ret | 3 | 5 | 3 | 6 | 1 | 5 | Ret | 11 | 7 | 10 | 7 | 11 | 9 | 3 | DSQ | 11 | Ret | 99 |
| 8 | (Germany) Manuel Reuter | Ret | 7 | 8 | 4 | 6 | Ret | Ret | Ret | 8 | 5 | 5 | Ret | Ret | 1 | Ret | Ret | 6 | 4 | Ret | Ret | 6 | 3 | 4 | 8 | 89 |
| 9 | (Germany) Christian Danner | 10 | 9 | 6 | 5 | 2 | 2 | 3 | Ret | 4 | 8 | Ret | 11 | 9 | DSQ | 7 | 5 | Ret | DNS | 10 | 18 | 5 | Ret | 10 | 6 | 88 |
| 10 | (Germany) Bernd Schneider | 19 | DNS | Ret | Ret | **Ret** | 16 | 5 | 2 | 3 | 18 | **Ret** | Ret | 2 | DSQ | **Ret** | 1 | 3 | 18 | Ret | DNS | 9 | 5 | 3 | 1 | 86 |
| 11 | (Germany) Ellen Lohr | 5 | 6 | 7 | 7 | 10 | 9 | Ret | Ret | 12 | Ret | 7 | 6 | 6 | Ret | 6 | 3 | 7 | 8 | 7 | Ret | 11 | 9 | 9 | 5 | 76 |
| 12 | (Italy) Stefano Modena | | | | | | | | | | | | | | | | | | | 1 | **1** | **2** | 2 | Ret | 7 | 74 |
| 13 | (Italy) Giorgio Francia | 3 | 3 | 10 | 9 | 8 | 8 | 6 | 12 | 7 | 9 | Ret | 4 | Ret | Ret | 8 | Ret | 9 | Ret | 9 | 7 | 4 | DNS | DNS | DNS | 70 |
| 14 | (Finland) Keke Rosberg | 12 | 10 | Ret | 3 | Ret | Ret | 13 | Ret | 9 | Ret | 17 | DNS | Ret | DNS | Ret | DSQ | 5 | Ret | 8 | Ret | 10 | Ret | 12 | Ret | 27 |
| 15 | (Germany) Michael Bartels | Ret | DNS | 12 | 12 | Ret | 14 | 9 | 8 | Ret | DNS | 8 | 9 | | | 12 | Ret | 12 | 9 | Ret | DNS | Ret | DNS | 7 | 3 | 23 |
| 16 | (Germany) John Winter | 16 | Ret | Ret | DNS | 14 | 18 | Ret | 7 | 15 | 10 | 9 | 10 | 11 | 7 | 14 | DNS | 15 | Ret | DNS | DNS | 13 | 6 | 17 | 10 | 11 |
| 17 | (Italy) Stefano Buttiero | 9 | DNS | 15 | 10 | 15 | 11 | | | Ret | Ret | 13 | DNS | | | 10 | 8 | 16 | DNS | | | | | | | 7 |
| 18 | (Germany) Uwe Alzen | 11 | 11 | 13 | 13 | 11 | 13 | 15 | 11 | 13 | 11 | Ret | Ret | 12 | 6 | 13 | 12 | 14 | 11 | 12 | 10 | 12 | 8 | 14 | 11 | 4 |
| 19 | (Germany) Alexander Grau | 14 | Ret | 16 | 14 | 13 | 15 | 12 | 9 | 14 | 13 | Ret | Ret | 14 | Ret | 16 | DNS | 13 | 10 | 13 | 11 | Ret | Ret | 13 | Ret | 1 |
| 20 | (Germany) Franz Engstler | Ret | 12 | 11 | Ret | Ret | 12 | 11 | 6 | DNS | DNS | 10 | Ret | | | | | | | | | | | | | 1 |
| 21 | (Germany) Stig Amthor | 13 | 13 | 14 | Ret | 18 | Ret | 16 | 10 | 18 | 14 | 12 | 12 | 15 | 11 | 19 | 13 | Ret | DNS | 14 | 15 | 16 | 10 | Ret | DNS | 1 |
| 22 | (Germany) Marc Gindorf | Ret | DNS | Ret | DNS | 20 | 17 | Ret | DNS | 19 | 12 | 11 | 13 | 17 | 10 | 15 | Ret | 18 | 13 | 15 | 14 | 14 | 11 | 15 | 13 | 0 |
| 23 | (United Kingdom) Andy Wallace | DNS | DNS | Ret | 15 | 16 | 20 | 14 | Ret | 11 | Ret | Ret | DNS | 13 | 5 | | | | | | | | | | | 0 |
| 24 | (Italy) Gianni Giudici | 15 | Ret | 17 | Ret | 17 | Ret | 18 | Ret | 17 | 15 | Ret | DNS | 16 | 9 | 18 | 14 | 17 | 12 | 16 | 13 | 15 | Ret | 16 | 12 | 0 |
| 25 | (Germany) Gerd Ruch | Ret | Ret | Ret | DNS | Ret | DNS | 20 | 15 | Ret | 17 | Ret | 14 | Ret | DNS | Ret | 16 | Ret | 14 | Ret | 12 | Ret | Ret | Ret | Ret | 0 |
| 26 | (Germany) Carsten Struwe | 18 | 14 | Ret | Ret | Ret | 19 | 19 | 13 | DNS | DNS | | | | | | | | | | | | | | | 0 |
| 27 | (Germany) Jürgen Ruch | 20 | Ret | Ret | Ret | 21 | 21 | Ret | Ret | Ret | Ret | Ret | DNS | 21 | 15 | Ret | Ret | 21 | 15 | 17 | 19 | Ret | Ret | 18 | 14 | 0 |
| 28 | (Germany) Jürgen Feucht | | | | | | | | | Ret | Ret | 14 | Ret | Ret | Ret | Ret | DNS | 20 | Ret | | | Ret | DNS | 19 | DNS | 0 |
| 29 | (Germany) Armin Bernhard | 17 | 15 | 18 | 16 | 23 | Ret | 21 | 16 | 20 | 16 | 15 | Ret | 18 | 13 | 20 | 15 | 19 | 16 | 18 | 17 | Ret | DNS | 20 | DNS | 0 |
| 30 | (Germany) Frank Schmickler | Ret | DNS | Ret | Ret | 19 | Ret | 22 | 14 | 16 | Ret | Ret | Ret | Ret | 12 | 17 | Ret | Ret | DNS | Ret | 16 | | | Ret | DNS | 0 |
| 31 | (Germany) Georg Severich | | | | | | | | | Ret | Ret | 16 | Ret | Ret | Ret | Ret | DNS | Ret | 17 | Ret | Ret | 17 | Ret | Ret | DNS | 0 |
| 32 | (Germany) Rüdiger Schmitt | Ret | DNS | Ret | Ret | 22 | Ret | Ret | DNS | | | | | | | | | | | | | | | | | 0 |
| - | (Germany) Harald Becker | Ret | Ret | Ret | Ret | Ret | DNS | Ret | Ret | Ret | DNS | | | | | | | | | | | | | | | 0 |
| - | (Germany) Fritz Huber | | | | | | | | | | | DNS | DNS | | | Ret | DNS | Ret | DNS | | | | | Ret | DNS | 0 |
| - | (Germany) Karsten Molitor | | | | | | | | | Ret | Ret | | | | | | | | | | | | | | | 0 |
| - | (Germany) Steffen Göpel | | | | | | | | | | | | | | | | | | | Ret | DNS | | | | | 0 |
| - | (Germany) Wolfgang Schrey | DNS | DNS | | | | | | | | | | | | | | | | | | | | | | | 0 |
| - | (Germany) Danny Pfeil | | | | | | | | | | | DNS | DNS | | | | | | | | | | | | | 0 |
| - | (Germany) Rüdiger Seyffarth | | | | | | | | | | | | | | | | | | | | | DNS | DNS | | | 0 |
| - | (United States) Danny Sullivan | | | | | | | 10 | 5 | | | | | 10 | 4 | | | | | | | | | | | 0† |
| - | (Australia) Neil Cunningham | | | | | | | | | | | | | 19 | 14 | | | | | | | | | | | 0† |
| Pos | Driver | ZOL (Belgium) | | HOC1 (Germany) | | NÜR1 (Germany) | | MUG‡ (Italy) | | NÜR2 (Germany) | | NOR (Germany) | | DON‡ (United Kingdom) | | DIE (Germany) | | NÜR3 (Germany) | | AVU (Germany) | | SIN (Germany) | | HOC2 (Germany) | | Pts |

| Colour | Result |
|---|---|
| Gold | Winner |
| Silver | Second place |
| Bronze | Third place |
| Green | Points classification |
| Blue | Non-points classification |
| Blue | Non-classified finish (NC) |
| Purple | Retired, not classified (Ret) |
| Red | Did not qualify (DNQ) |
| Red | Did not pre-qualify (DNPQ) |
| Black | Disqualified (DSQ) |
| White | Did not start (DNS) |
| White | Withdrew (WD) |
| White | Race cancelled (C) |
| Blank | Did not practice (DNP) |
| Blank | Did not arrive (DNA) |
| Blank | Excluded (EX) |

**Bold** – Pole
Italics – Fastest Lap

† Not classified in the championship due to only entering the non-championship events.

‡ Non-championship event.

=== Notes ===
- Points System: 20–15–12–10–8–6–4–3–2–1 for the Top 10 drivers in each race. No extra points awarded.

== Bibliography ==
- Voigt, Thomas (December 1994). Tourenwagen Story '94: Die Rennen, die Fahrer, die Technik (in German). Berlin: Sportverlag Berlin. ISBN 978-3-328-00640-4.
