= 1995 Deutsche Tourenwagen Meisterschaft =

Touring car racing series in Europe

Seasons
- ← 1994 1996 →

The 1995 Deutsche Tourenwagen Meisterschaft was the twelfth season of premier German touring car championship, the tenth season under the moniker of Deutsche Tourenwagen Meisterschaft and also the first season under International Touring Car Series moniker due to transition, both open to FIA Class 1 Touring Cars. The two series were contested by the same cars, teams and drivers with Bernd Schneider winning both drivers titles and Mercedes-Benz winning both manufacturers awards.

== Teams and drivers ==
Manufacturer	Car	Team	No.	Drivers	Rounds
Opel	Opel Calibra V6 4×4	(Germany) Opel Team Rosberg	1	(Germany) Klaus Ludwig	All
Opel	Opel Calibra V6 4×4	(Germany) Opel Team Rosberg	2	(Finland) Keke Rosberg	All
Opel	Opel Calibra V6 4×4	(Germany) Opel Team Joest	9	(Germany) Manuel Reuter	All
Opel	Opel Calibra V6 4×4	(Germany) Opel Team Joest	10	(France) Yannick Dalmas	1–6, 8–12
Opel	Opel Calibra V6 4×4	(Germany) Opel Team Joest	20	(Finland) JJ Lehto	All
Opel	Opel Calibra V6 4×4	(Germany) Opel Team Joest	21	(Portugal) Ni Amorim	1–3, 5, 7–11
Mercedes-Benz	Mercedes C-Class V6	(Germany) AMG-Mercedes	3	(Germany) Jörg van Ommen	All
Mercedes-Benz	Mercedes C-Class V6	(Germany) AMG-Mercedes	4	(Denmark) Jan Magnussen	1–5, 7–12
Mercedes-Benz	Mercedes C-Class V6	(Germany) Zakspeed Mercedes	5	(Germany) Alexander Grau	All
Mercedes-Benz	Mercedes C-Class V6	(Germany) Zakspeed Mercedes	6	(Denmark) Kurt Thiim	All
Mercedes-Benz	Mercedes C-Class V6	(Germany) Zakspeed Mercedes	16	(Germany) Louis Krages	All
Mercedes-Benz	Mercedes C-Class V6	(Germany) Zakspeed Mercedes	17	(Germany) Ellen Lohr	All
Mercedes-Benz	Mercedes C-Class V6	(Germany) D2 AMG-Mercedes	14	(Germany) Bernd Schneider	All
Mercedes-Benz	Mercedes C-Class V6	(Germany) D2 AMG-Mercedes	15	(United Kingdom) Dario Franchitti	All
Mercedes-Benz	Mercedes C-Class V6	(Germany) Persson Motorsport	22	(Germany) Uwe Alzen	All
Mercedes-Benz	Mercedes C-Class V6	(Germany) Persson Motorsport	23	(Germany) Bernd Mayländer	All
Mercedes-Benz	Mercedes C-Class V6	(Germany) Ruch Motorsport	24	(Germany) Gerd Ruch	All
Alfa Romeo	Alfa Romeo 155 V6 Ti	(Italy) Alfa Corse	7	(Italy) Alessandro Nannini	All
Alfa Romeo	Alfa Romeo 155 V6 Ti	(Italy) Alfa Corse	8	(Italy) Nicola Larini	All
Alfa Romeo	Alfa Romeo 155 V6 Ti	(Germany) Schübel Engineering	11	(Germany) Christian Danner	All
Alfa Romeo	Alfa Romeo 155 V6 Ti	(Germany) Schübel Engineering	12	(Italy) Michele Alboreto	All
Alfa Romeo	Alfa Romeo 155 V6 Ti	(Italy) Alfa Corse 2	13	(Italy) Gianni Giudici	All
Alfa Romeo	Alfa Romeo 155 V6 Ti	(Italy) Alfa Corse 2	25	(Germany) Stig Amthor	1–4, 6
Alfa Romeo	Alfa Romeo 155 V6 Ti	(Italy) Alfa Corse 2	26	(Italy) Giancarlo Fisichella	All
Alfa Romeo	Alfa Romeo 155 V6 Ti	(Italy) Alfa Corse 2	27	(Finland) Markku Alén	1, 4
Alfa Romeo	Alfa Romeo 155 V6 Ti	(Italy) Alfa Corse 2	28	(Italy) Fabrizio Giovanardi	5
Alfa Romeo	Alfa Romeo 155 V6 Ti	(Italy) Alfa Corse 2	29	(Italy) Giampiero Simoni	7
Alfa Romeo	Alfa Romeo 155 V6 Ti	(Italy) Alfa Corse 2	30	(Italy) Gabriele Tarquini	9–11
Alfa Romeo	Alfa Romeo 155 V6 Ti	(Italy) Alfa Corse 2	31	(Portugal) Pedro Couceiro	8
Alfa Romeo	Alfa Romeo 155 V6 Ti	(Italy) Alfa Corse 2	32	(France) Philippe Gache	11
Alfa Romeo	Alfa Romeo 155 V6 Ti	(Italy) Euroteam	18	(Italy) Stefano Modena	All
Alfa Romeo	Alfa Romeo 155 V6 Ti	(Italy) Euroteam	19	(Germany) Michael Bartels	All

== Schedule and results ==
Round		Country	Circuit	Date	Series	Pole position	Fastest lap	Winning driver	Winning team	Report
1	R1	Germany	Hockenheimring	23 April	DTM	(United Kingdom) Dario Franchitti	(Germany) Bernd Schneider	(Germany) Bernd Schneider	D2 AMG-Mercedes	Report
1	R2	Germany	Hockenheimring	23 April	DTM		(Germany) Bernd Schneider	(Germany) Bernd Schneider	D2 AMG-Mercedes	Report
2	R1	Germany	AVUS	7 May	DTM	(Denmark) Kurt Thiim	(Denmark) Kurt Thiim	(Denmark) Kurt Thiim	Zakspeed Mercedes	Report
2	R2	Germany	AVUS	7 May	DTM	Race Annulled				Report
3	R1	Italy	Mugello	21 May	ITC	(Germany) Bernd Schneider	(Germany) Bernd Schneider	(Germany) Bernd Schneider	D2 AMG-Mercedes	Report
3	R2	Italy	Mugello	21 May	ITC		(Italy) Stefano Modena	(United Kingdom) Dario Franchitti	D2 AMG-Mercedes	Report
4	R1	Finland	Helsinki Thunder	4 June	ITC	(Germany) Michael Bartels	(Italy) Nicola Larini	(Germany) Christian Danner	Schübel Engineering	Report
4	R2	Finland	Helsinki Thunder	4 June	ITC	(Germany) Michael Bartels	(Italy) Stefano Modena	(Italy) Nicola Larini	Alfa Corse	Report
5	R1	Germany	Norisring	25 June	DTM	(Germany) Bernd Schneider	(Germany) Bernd Schneider	(Germany) Christian Danner	Schübel Engineering	Report
5	R2	Germany	Norisring	25 June	DTM		(Germany) Bernd Schneider	(Germany) Bernd Schneider	D2 AMG-Mercedes	Report
6	R1	(United Kingdom) Great Britain	Donington Park	9 July	ITC	(Germany) Bernd Schneider	(Germany) Bernd Schneider	(Germany) Bernd Schneider	D2 AMG-Mercedes	Report
6	R2	(United Kingdom) Great Britain	Donington Park	9 July	ITC		(Germany) Bernd Schneider	(Germany) Bernd Schneider	D2 AMG-Mercedes	Report
7	R1	Germany	Diepholz Airfield Circuit	23 July	DTM	(Germany) Michael Bartels	(Italy) Nicola Larini	(Germany) Michael Bartels	Euroteam	Report
7	R2	Germany	Diepholz Airfield Circuit	23 July	DTM		(Denmark) Jan Magnussen	(Germany) Michael Bartels	Euroteam	Report
8	R1	Portugal	Autódromo do Estoril	6 August	ITC	(Italy) Nicola Larini	(Italy) Nicola Larini	(Germany) Bernd Schneider	D2 AMG-Mercedes	Report
8	R2	Portugal	Autódromo do Estoril	6 August	ITC		(Italy) Nicola Larini	(Denmark) Jan Magnussen	AMG-Mercedes	Report
9	R1	Germany	Nürburgring	20 August	DTM	(Germany) Bernd Schneider	(Denmark) Kurt Thiim	(Germany) Bernd Schneider	D2 AMG-Mercedes	Report
9	R2	Germany	Nürburgring	20 August	DTM		(Germany) Alexander Grau	(Germany) Bernd Schneider	D2 AMG-Mercedes	Report
10	R1	Germany	Alemannenring	17 September	DTM	(United Kingdom) Dario Franchitti	(Denmark) Kurt Thiim	(Denmark) Kurt Thiim	Zakspeed Mercedes	Report
10	R2	Germany	Alemannenring	17 September	DTM		(United Kingdom) Dario Franchitti	(Denmark) Kurt Thiim	Zakspeed Mercedes	Report
11	R1	France	Circuit de Nevers	8 October	ITC	(Italy) Nicola Larini	(Germany) Bernd Schneider	(Germany) Bernd Schneider	D2 AMG-Mercedes	Report
11	R2	France	Circuit de Nevers	8 October	ITC		(Germany) Bernd Schneider	(Germany) Bernd Schneider	D2 AMG-Mercedes	Report
12	R1	Germany	Hockenheimring	15 October	DTM	(United Kingdom) Dario Franchitti	(Denmark) Kurt Thiim	(Germany) Klaus Ludwig	Opel Team Rosberg	Report
12	R2	Germany	Hockenheimring	15 October	DTM		(France) Yannick Dalmas	(Germany) Klaus Ludwig	Opel Team Rosberg	Report

DTM race
ITC race

== Driver Standings/results ==
=== Deutsche Tourenwagen Meisterschaft Championship ===
Points system
**1st**	**2nd**	**3rd**	**4th**	**5th**	**6th**	**7th**	**8th**	**9th**	**10th**
20	15	12	10	8	6	4	3	2	1

Pos	Driver	HOC1 (Germany)		AVU (Germany)		NOR (Germany)		DIE (Germany)		NÜR (Germany)		SIN (Germany)		HOC2 (Germany)		Pts
1	(Germany) Bernd Schneider	1	**1**	Ret	11	**4**	1	7	6	**1**	**1**	6	3	Ret	13	138
2	(Germany) Jörg van Ommen	2	2	7	DNS	13	3	5	3	5	6	8	5	4	3	113
3	(Germany) Klaus Ludwig	5	3	Ret	DNS	2	Ret	Ret	Ret	7	10	Ret	DNS	1	**1**	80
4	(Denmark) Kurt Thiim	Ret	5	**1**	**1**	Ret	DNS	Ret	DNS	Ret	4	1	**1**	19	11	78
5	(United Kingdom) Dario Franchitti	3	DNS	Ret	Ret	6	2	2	4	Ret	Ret	**2**	10	**Ret**	DNS	74
6	(Italy) Nicola Larini	**10**	Ret	Ret	6	8	10†	3	2	2	3	3	Ret	Ret	Ret	71
7	(Germany) Alexander Grau	14	6	2	14	12	5	Ret	DNS	3	2	Ret	Ret	7	5	68
8	(Denmark) Jan Magnussen	4	Ret	Ret	7	DNS	DNS	14	5	Ret	7	4	2	Ret	9	49
9	(Germany) Christian Danner	16	9	8	3	1	**6**	8	Ret	12	14	7	4	15	16	48
10	(Germany) Michael Bartels	Ret	DNS	6	Ret	10†	Ret	**1**	**1**	10	Ret	Ret	DNS	13	Ret	47
11	(Italy) Alessandro Nannini	18	DNS	3	Ret	3	9†	4	Ret	Ret	Ret	11	Ret	5	12	44
12	(Germany) Manuel Reuter	22	Ret	Ret	13	Ret	Ret	16†	7	Ret	9	5	Ret	2	4	39
13	(Finland) JJ Lehto	8	4	10	20	7	Ret	15	8	NC	Ret	Ret	8	6	6	36
14	(Germany) Uwe Alzen	11	Ret	Ret	12	15	Ret	Ret	Ret	9	8	12	9	3	2	34
15	(Italy) Giancarlo Fisichella	6	Ret	4	19	DNS	DNS	6	Ret	6	Ret	15†	Ret	10	10	30
16	(Italy) Stefano Modena	Ret	DNS	5	2	5	4	12	Ret	Ret	DNS	Ret	DNS	14	Ret	26
17	(Germany) Ellen Lohr	12	Ret	Ret	5	11	Ret	10	9	8	5	Ret	7	11	Ret	18
18	(Finland) Keke Rosberg	7	Ret	9	4	Ret	Ret	Ret	Ret	4	Ret	10	Ret	12	14	17
19	(France) Yannick Dalmas	9	Ret	11	10	18†	Ret			Ret	16†	9	6	8	7	17
20	(Germany) Bernd Mayländer	13	NC	Ret	18	16	7	9	10	11	11	13	Ret	9	8	12
21	(Portugal) Ni Amorim	18	8	15	DNS	9	Ret	Ret	12	14	12	NC	11			5
22	(Italy) Michele Alboreto	15	7	12	8	14	Ret	11	11	13	Ret	Ret	DNS	16	15	4
23	(Germany) Louis Krages	Ret	DNS	16	16	17	8	Ret	13	16	15	14	12	Ret	18	3
24	(Germany) Stig Amthor	19	10	13	9											1
25	(Finland) Markku Alén	Ret	11													0
26	(Italy) Gianni Giudici	20	12	Ret	17	Ret	Ret	13	NC	Ret	DNS	Ret	Ret	17	Ret	0
27	(Germany) Gerd Ruch	21	Ret	14	15	Ret	DNS	Ret	DNS	15	13	Ret	Ret	18	17	0
–	(Italy) Gabriele Tarquini									Ret	Ret	Ret	DNS			0
–	(Italy) Fabrizio Giovanardi					Ret	DNS									0
–	(Italy) Giampiero Simoni							Ret	DNS							0
Pos	Driver	HOC1 (Germany)		AVU (Germany)		NOR (Germany)		DIE (Germany)		NÜR (Germany)		SIN (Germany)		HOC2 (Germany)		Pts

Colour	Result
Gold	Winner
Silver	Second place
Bronze	Third place
Green	Points classification
Blue	Non-points classification
Blue	Non-classified finish (NC)
Purple	Retired, not classified (Ret)
Red	Did not qualify (DNQ)
Red	Did not pre-qualify (DNPQ)
Black	Disqualified (DSQ)
White	Did not start (DNS)
White	Withdrew (WD)
White	Race cancelled (C)
Blank	Did not practice (DNP)
Blank	Did not arrive (DNA)
Blank	Excluded (EX)

**Bold** – Pole
Italics – Fastest Lap

† Drivers did not finish the race, but were classified as they completed over 90% of the race distance.

=== Deutsche Tourenwagen Meisterschaft Manufacturers Championship ===
Pos	Manufacturer	HOC1 (Germany)		AVU (Germany)		NOR (Germany)		DIE (Germany)		NÜR (Germany)		SIN (Germany)		HOC2 (Germany)		Pts
1	Mercedes-Benz	1	1	1	1	4	1	2	3	1	1	1	1	3	2	224
2	Alfa Romeo	6	7	3	2	1	4	1	1	2	3	3	4	5	10	150
3	Opel	5	3	9	4	2	Ret	15	7	4	9	5	6	1	1	107
Pos	Manufacturer	HOC1 (Germany)		AVU (Germany)		NOR (Germany)		DIE (Germany)		NÜR (Germany)		SIN (Germany)		HOC2 (Germany)		Pts

=== International Touring Car Series ===
Points system
**1st**	**2nd**	**3rd**	**4th**	**5th**	**6th**	**7th**	**8th**	**9th**	**10th**
20	15	12	10	8	6	4	3	2	1

Pos	Driver	MUG (Italy)		HEL (Finland)		DON (United Kingdom)		EST (Portugal)		MAG (France)		Pts
1	(Germany) Bernd Schneider	**1**	**3**	5	Ret	**1**	**1**	1	**2**	1	**1**	155
2	(Denmark) Jan Magnussen	3	6	Ret	2			2	1	2	11	83
3	(United Kingdom) Dario Franchitti	4	1	12†	DNS	2	2	5	3	Ret	DNS	80
4	(Italy) Nicola Larini	2	5	7	1	Ret	12	**3**	Ret	**Ret**	DNS	59
5	(Germany) Jörg van Ommen	Ret	7	DNS	DNS	4	3	14	6	6	3	50
6	(Germany) Manuel Reuter	9	Ret	4	7	10	6	16	9	4	2	50
7	(Italy) Stefano Modena	6	11	2	Ret	6	13	20	5	5	6	49
8	(Denmark) Kurt Thiim	Ret	4	Ret	6	3	4	6	16	10	Ret	45
9	(Germany) Alexander Grau			8	3	9	5	7	4	11	Ret	39
10	(Italy) Giancarlo Fisichella	7	2	16†	Ret	5	Ret	4	14	Ret	Ret	37
11	(Finland) JJ Lehto	11	8	3	Ret	14	11	11	11	8	5	26
12	(Germany) Uwe Alzen	14	9	NC	4	7	7	13	12	9	7	26
13	(Germany) Christian Danner	Ret	12	1	**13**†	12	9	15	DNS	Ret	13	22
14	(Germany) Klaus Ludwig	8	Ret	15	Ret	8	Ret	17	8	3	Ret	21
15	(Italy) Alessandro Nannini	5	Ret	Ret	Ret	DNS	DNS	8	7	Ret	9	17
16	(France) Yannick Dalmas	15	Ret	Ret	Ret	Ret	DNS	10	17	7	4	15
17	(Germany) Ellen Lohr	10	Ret	Ret	5	Ret	10	9	10	15†	Ret	13
18	(Italy) Gianni Giudici	Ret	14	6	8	17	14	Ret	18	Ret	Ret	9
19	(Germany) Bernd Mayländer	12	10	9	9	11	8	12	13	Ret	12	8
20	(Finland) Keke Rosberg	Ret	DNS	Ret	Ret	13	Ret	Ret	Ret	12	8	3
21	(Finland) Markku Alén			13	10							1
22	(France) Philippe Gache									13	10	1
23	(Germany) Stig Amthor	16	Ret	10	12†	15	Ret					1
24	(Germany) Gerd Ruch	Ret	13	11	Ret	16	16	Ret	19	16	14	0
25	(Germany) Louis Krages	Ret	Ret	14	11	18	15	Ret	Ret			0
26	(Germany) Michael Bartels	13	DNS	**Ret**	DNS	19	Ret	21†	DNS	18†	DNS	0
27	(Portugal) Ni Amorim	DSQ	DNS					18	15	14	Ret	0
28	(Italy) Michele Alboreto	Ret	DNS	Ret	Ret	Ret	17	Ret	DNS	DNS	Ret	0
29	(Italy) Gabriele Tarquini									17†	DNS	0
30	(Portugal) Pedro Couceiro							19	20†			0
Pos	Driver	MUG (Italy)		HEL (Finland)		DON (United Kingdom)		EST (Portugal)		MAG (France)		Pts

Colour	Result
Gold	Winner
Silver	Second place
Bronze	Third place
Green	Points classification
Blue	Non-points classification
Blue	Non-classified finish (NC)
Purple	Retired, not classified (Ret)
Red	Did not qualify (DNQ)
Red	Did not pre-qualify (DNPQ)
Black	Disqualified (DSQ)
White	Did not start (DNS)
White	Withdrew (WD)
White	Race cancelled (C)
Blank	Did not practice (DNP)
Blank	Did not arrive (DNA)
Blank	Excluded (EX)

**Bold** – Pole
Italics – Fastest Lap

† Drivers did not finish the race, but were classified as they completed over 90% of the race distance.

=== International Touring Car Series Manufacturers Championship ===
Pos	Manufacturer	MUG (Italy)		HEL (Finland)		DON (United Kingdom)		EST (Portugal)		MAG (France)		Pts
1	Mercedes-Benz	1	1	5	2	1	1	1	1	1	1	183
2	Alfa Romeo	2	2	1	1	5	9	3	5	5	6	114
3	Opel	8	8	3	7	8	6	10	8	3	2	62
Pos	Manufacturer	MUG (Italy)		HEL (Finland)		DON (United Kingdom)		EST (Portugal)		MAG (France)		Pts

== Bibliography ==
- Voigt, Thomas (1995). Tourenwagen Story '95: Die Rennen, die Fahrer, die Technik (in German). Berlin: Sportverlag Berlin. ISBN 978-3-328-00659-6.
