= Jörg van Ommen =

German racing driver (born 1962)

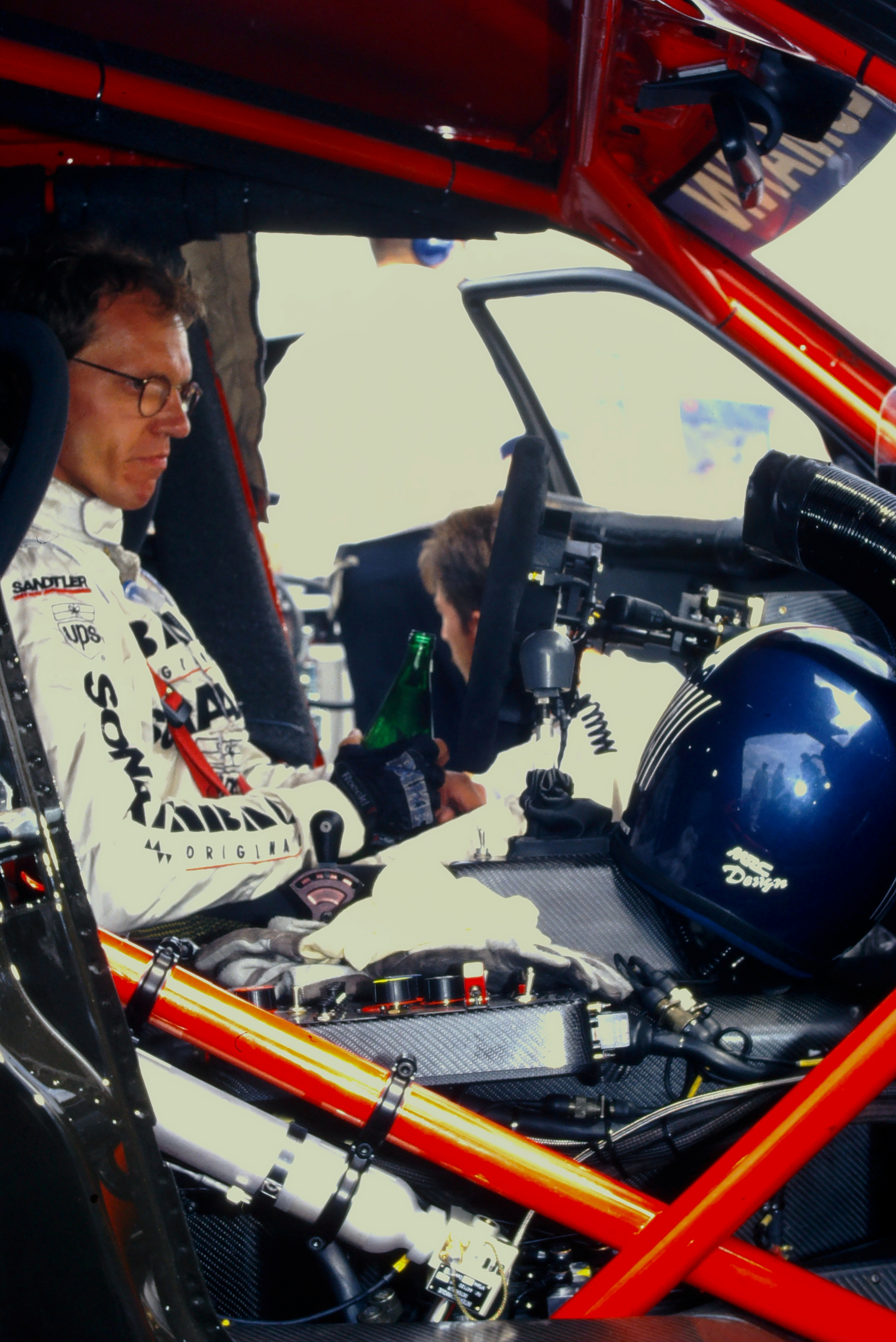
- Jörg van Ommen in the cockpit of his Mercedes C-Class in Singen for the 1995 DTM
- Born: 27 September 1962 (age 63); Moers, North Rhine-Westphalia, West Germany
- Relatives: Hubert Hahne (uncle); Armin Hahne (uncle)

Jörg van Ommen (born 27 September 1962 in Moers, North Rhine-Westphalia) is a German former racing driver. He drove for Mercedes-AMG in the DTM in 1995 and 1996, finishing in second place in 1995 in a Mercedes C-Class. He also is the nephew of Hubert Hahne and Armin Hahne.

== Racing record ==
=== Complete Deutsche Tourenwagen Meisterschaft results ===
(key) (Races in bold indicate pole position) (Races in italics indicate fastest lap)

Year	Team	Car	1	2	3	4	5	6	7	8	9	10	11	12	13	14	15	16	17	18	19	20	21	22	23	24	Pos.	Pts
1984	Austin Rover Deutschland	Rover Vitesse	**ZOL**; 6	**HOC**; Ret	**AVU**; 2	AVU; DNS	MFA; Ret	WUN; 8	NÜR; 3	NÜR; Ret	NOR	NÜR	DIE	HOC	HOC												15th	41
1984	Vogelsang Automobile GmbH	BMW 635 CSi														ZOL; Ret	NÜR; Ret										15th	41
1985		Ford Sierra XR4 TI	ZOL	WUN	AVU	MFA	ERD	ERD	DIE; 8	DIE; DNS	ZOL	SIE	NÜR														37th	5.5
1986	Scuderia Kassel	Mercedes 190E 2.3-16	ZOL	HOC	NÜR	AVU	MFA	WUN	NÜR	**ZOL**; DNS	NÜR; 5																25th	14
1987	AMG Marko RSM	Mercedes 190 E 2.3-16	HOC; 3	ZOL; 4	NÜR; 10	AVU; 5	MFA; 6	NOR; Ret	NÜR; 23	WUN; 10	DIE; Ret	SAL; Ret															9th	76
1988	Star AMG Marko RSM	Mercedes 190 E 2.3-16	ZOL; 1; 3	ZOL; 2; 4	HOC; 1; 4	HOC; 2; 10	NÜR; 1; 8	NÜR; 2 Ret	BRN; 1; 30	BRN; 2; 6	AVU; 1 Ret	AVU; 2 DNS	MFA; 1; 6	MFA; 2 Ret	NÜR; 1 Ret	NÜR; 2 DNS	NOR; 1; 26	NOR; 2; 22	WUN; 1 Ret	WUN; 2 DNS	SAL; 1	SAL; 2	HUN; 1; 6	HUN; 2; 20	HOC; 1; 15	HOC; 2; 3	15th	125
1989	Star-Marko RSM	Mercedes 190 E 2.3-16	ZOL; 1; 13	ZOL; 2; 11	HOC; 1; 15	HOC; 2; 14	NÜR; 1 Ret	NÜR; 2 DNS	MFA; 1; 15	MFA; 2 Ret	AVU; 1; 13	AVU; 2; 6	NÜR; 1; 9	NÜR; 2; 9	NOR; 1 DNQ	NOR; 2; 13	HOC; 1; 20	HOC; 2; 12	DIE; 1; 20	DIE; 2; 17	NÜR; 1; 19	NÜR; 2; 17	HOC; 1; 32	HOC; 2; 13			17th	89
1990	MS-Jet-Racing	Mercedes 190E 2.5-16 Evo	ZOL; 1 Ret	ZOL; 2 DNS	HOC; 1; 8	HOC; 2; 7	NÜR; 1 Ret	NÜR; 2 Ret	AVU; 1; 11	AVU; 2 Ret	MFA; 1; 13	MFA; 2; 9	WUN; 1; 2	WUN; 2; 3	NÜR; 1 Ret	NÜR; 2 DNS	NOR; 1; 21	NOR; 2; 6	DIE; 1; 22	DIE; 2 DNS	NÜR; 1 Ret	NÜR; 2 Ret					14th	42
1990	MS-Jet-Racing	Mercedes 190E 2.5-16 Evo2																					HOC; 1 Ret	HOC; 2 DNS			14th	42
1991	MS-Jet-Racing	Mercedes 190E 2.5-16 Evo2	ZOL; 1; 14	ZOL; 2; 8	HOC; 1; 10	HOC; 2; 10	NÜR; 1; 3	NÜR; 2; 2	AVU; 1; 9	AVU; 2; 8	WUN; 1 Ret	WUN; 2; 15	NOR; 1 Ret	NOR; 2 Ret	DIE; 1; 16	DIE; 2; 11	**NÜR**; **1** DSQ	NÜR; 2 Ret	ALE; 1; 13	ALE; 2 Ret	HOC; 1 Ret	HOC; 2; 9	BRN; 1; 10	BRN; 2 Ret	DON; 1; 11	DON; 2; 9	13th	39
1992	MS Racing	Mercedes 190E 2.5-16 Evo2	ZOL; 1; 10	ZOL; 2; 5	NÜR; 1; 20	NÜR; 2; 9	WUN; 1; 1	**WUN**; **2**; 2	AVU; 1; 11	AVU; 2; 5	HOC; 1; 20	HOC; 2; 9	NÜR; 1; 10	NÜR; 2; 12	NOR; 1; 9	NOR; 2; 10	BRN; 1; 4	BRN; 2 Ret	DIE; 1; 10	DIE; 2; 11	ALE; 1; 3	ALE; 2; 3	NÜR; 1; 10	NÜR; 2; 9	HOC; 1; 5	HOC; 2 Ret	10th	106
1993	Diebels Zakspeed Team	Mercedes 190E 2.5-16 Evo2	ZOL; 1; 5	ZOL; 2; 5	HOC; 1; 4	HOC; 2; 10	NÜR; 1; 8	NÜR; 2 Ret	WUN; 1; 11	WUN; 2 Ret																	9th	80
1993	Diebels Zakspeed Team	Mercedes 190E 2.5-16 93									**NÜR**; **1**; 3	NÜR; 2 Ret	NOR; 1; 2	NOR; 2; 4	DON; 1 Ret	DON; 2; 9	DIE; 1; 9	DIE; 2; 11	ALE; 1 Ret	ALE; 2; 8	AVU; 1; 8	AVU; 2; 10	HOC; 1 Ret	HOC; 2; 7			9th	80
1994	Promarkt-Zakspeed-Team	Mercedes C-Class V6	ZOL; 1; 4	ZOL; 2; 4	HOC; 1; 2	HOC; 2 Ret	NÜR; 1; 3	NÜR; 2; 5	MUG; 1; 2	MUG; 2; 1	NÜR; 1; 10	NÜR; 2; 2	NOR; 1; 2	NOR; 2; 8	DON; 1; 8	DON; 2; 2	DIE; 1; 9	DIE; 2; 10	**NÜR**; **1**; 1	**NÜR**; **2**; 1	AVU; 1; 6	AVU; 2; 4	ALE; 1; 7	ALE; 2 Ret	HOC; 1; 5	HOC; 2; 2	2nd	175
1995	UPS-Tabac Original-Sonax-Team AMG Mercedes	Mercedes C-Class V6	HOC; 1; 2	HOC; 2; 2	AVU; 1; 7	AVU; 2 DNS	NOR; 1; 13	NOR; 2; 3	DIE; 1; 5	DIE; 2; 3	NÜR; 1; 5	NÜR; 2; 6	ALE; 1; 8	ALE; 2; 5	HOC; 1; 4	HOC; 2; 3											2nd	113

=== Complete International Touring Car Championship results ===
(key) (Races in bold indicate pole position) (Races in italics indicate fastest lap)

Year	Team	Car	1	2	3	4	5	6	7	8	9	10	11	12	13	14	15	16	17	18	19	20	21	22	23	24	25	26	Pos.	Pts
1995	UPS-Tabac Original-Sonax-Team AMG Mercedes	Mercedes C-Class V6	MUG; 1 Ret	MUG; 2; 7	HEL; 1 DNS	HEL; 2 DNS	DON; 1; 4	DON; 2; 3	EST; 1; 14	EST; 2; 6	MAG; 1; 6	MAG; 2; 3																	5th	50
1996	UPS Mercedes-AMG	Mercedes C-Class	HOC; 1 Ret	HOC; 2; 9	**NÜR**; **1**; 1	**NÜR**; **2**; 13†	EST; 1; 7	EST; 2; 4	HEL; 1; 9	HEL; 2 Ret	NOR; 1; 8	NOR; 2; 7	DIE; 1; 13	DIE; 2; 5	SIL; 1; 18	SIL; 2 Ret	NÜR; 1; 9	NÜR; 2; 8	MAG; 1; 8	MAG; 2; 9	MUG; 1 NC	MUG; 2; 8	HOC; 1; 8	HOC; 2; 3	INT; 1; 15	INT; 2; 6	SUZ; 1; 14	SUZ; 2; 13	13th	87

- † — Retired, but was classified as he completed 90% of the winner's race distance.

=== Complete Super Tourenwagen Cup results ===
(key) (Races in bold indicate pole position) (Races in italics indicate fastest lap)

Year	Team	Car	1	2	3	4	5	6	7	8	9	10	11	12	13	14	15	16	17	18	19	20	Pos.	Pts
1997	Peugeot Esso	Peugeot 406	HOC; 1; 3	HOC; 2; 4	ZOL; 1; 9	ZOL; 2; 19	NÜR; 1; 4	NÜR; 2; 5	SAC; 1; 5	SAC; 2; 4	NOR; 1; 3	NOR; 2; 2	WUN; 1; 6	WUN; 2; 10	ZWE; 1; 17	ZWE; 2 Ret	SAL; 1; 2	SAL; 2; 24	REG; 1; 6	REG; 2; 21	NÜR; 1; 2	NÜR; 2; 4	4th	377
1998	Peugeot Esso	Peugeot 406	HOC; 1 Ret	HOC; 2 DNS	NÜR; 1; 9	NÜR; 2; 6	SAC; 1; 11	SAC; 2; 9	NOR; 1; 1	**NOR**; **2** DNS	REG; 1 Ret	REG; 2; 11	WUN; 1; 4	WUN; 2; 3	ZWE; 1 Ret	ZWE; 2; 7	SAL; 1; 6	SAL; 2; 5	OSC; 1; 14	OSC; 2; 11	NÜR; 1; 11	NÜR; 2; 13	10th	311
