= Gianni Giudici =

Italian racing driver (born 1946)

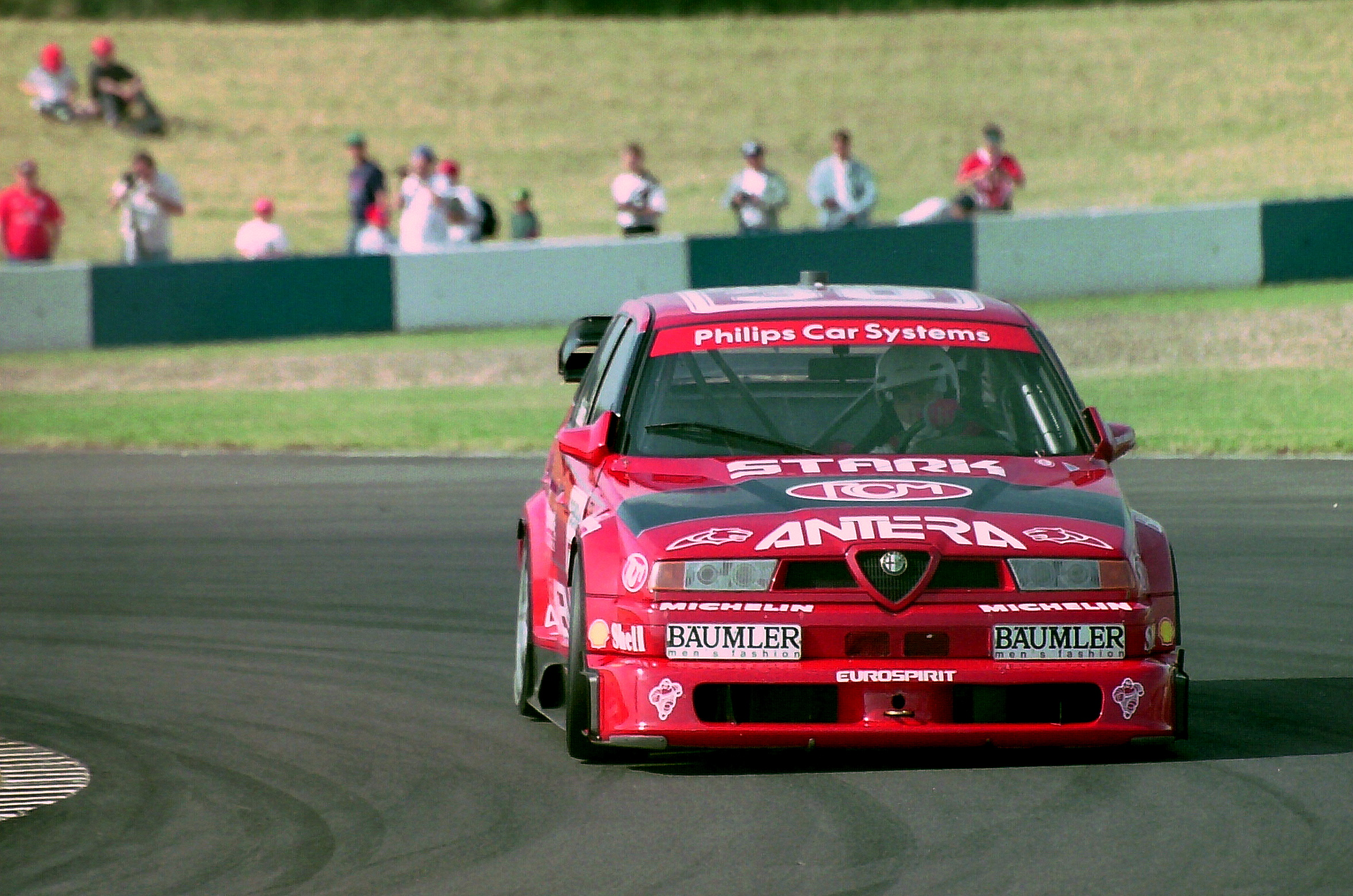
- Gianni Giudici in an Alfa Romeo 155 V6 TI at Melbourne Hairpin, Donington Park, 1994 DTM.
- Nationality: (Italy) Italian
- Born: 10 March 1946 (age 80) Abbiategrasso, Italy

Gianni Giudici (born 10 March 1946) is an Italian racing driver from Abbiategrasso, in the Province of Milan.

== Career ==
- 1970–1992: Italian Touring Car Championship
- 1993: Deutsche Tourenwagen Meisterschaft
- 1994: Deutsche Tourenwagen Meisterschaft
- 1995: 18th in International Touring Car Series
- 1996: International Touring Car Championship
- 1998: International Sports Racing Series
- 2002: 18th in V8Star Series, German Alfa 147 Cup
- 2004: Euro Formula 3000 (2 Races)
- 2005: FIA GT Championship (1 Race)

== Racing record ==
=== Complete Deutsche Tourenwagen Meisterschaft results ===
(key) (Races in bold indicate pole position) (Races in italics indicate fastest lap)

Year	Team	Car	1	2	3	4	5	6	7	8	9	10	11	12	13	14	15	16	17	18	19	20	21	22	23	24	Pos.	Pts
1993	Scuderia Giudici	Alfa Romeo 155 TS	ZOL; 1 Ret	ZOL; 2 Ret	HOC; 1 Ret	HOC; 2; 21	NÜR; 1; 25	NÜR; 2 Ret	WUN; 1; 21	WUN; 2; 15	NÜR; 1; 22	NÜR; 2; 16	NOR; 1	NOR; 2	DON; 1; 24	DON; 2; 22	DIE; 1 NC	DIE; 2 Ret	ALE; 1	ALE; 2	AVU; 1	AVU; 2	HOC; 1; 14	HOC; 2 Ret			35th	0
1994	Scuderia Giudici	Alfa Romeo 155 V6 Ti	ZOL; 1; 15	ZOL; 2 Ret	HOC; 1; 17	HOC; 2 Ret	NÜR; 1; 17	NÜR; 2 Ret	MUG; 1; 18	MUG; 2 Ret	NÜR; 1; 17	NÜR; 2; 15	NOR; 1 Ret	NOR; 2 DNS	DON; 1; 16	DON; 2; 9	DIE; 1; 18	DIE; 2; 14	NÜR; 1; 17	NÜR; 2; 12	AVU; 1; 16	AVU; 2; 13	ALE; 1; 15	ALE; 2 Ret	HOC; 1; 16	HOC; 2; 12	24th	0
1995	Alfa Corse 2	Alfa Romeo 155 V6 Ti	HOC; 1; 20	HOC; 2; 12	AVU; 1 Ret	AVU; 2; 17	NOR; 1 Ret	NOR; 2 Ret	DIE; 1; 13	DIE; 2 NC	NÜR; 1 Ret	NÜR; 2 DNS	ALE; 1 Ret	ALE; 2 Ret	HOC; 1; 17	HOC; 2 Ret											26th	0

=== Complete International Touring Car Championship results ===
(key) (Races in bold indicate pole position) (Races in italics indicate fastest lap)

Year	Team	Car	1	2	3	4	5	6	7	8	9	10	11	12	13	14	15	16	17	18	19	20	21	22	23	24	25	26	Pos.	Pts
1995	Alfa Corse 2	Alfa Romeo 155 V6 Ti	MUG; 1 Ret	MUG; 2; 14	HEL; 1; 6	HEL; 2; 8	DON; 1; 17	DON; 2; 14	EST; 1 Ret	EST; 2; 18	MAG; 1 Ret	MAG; 2 Ret																	18th	9
1996	Giudici Motorsport	Alfa Romeo 155 V6 TI	HOC; 1 Ret	HOC; 2; 15	NÜR; 1 Ret	NÜR; 2 DNS	EST; 1; 17	EST; 2; 15	HEL; 1; 19	HEL; 2 NC	NOR; 1 Ret	NOR; 2; 14																	30th	0
1996	Giudici Motorsport	Opel Calibra V6 4x4											DIE; 1 Ret	DIE; 2 Ret	SIL; 1; 19	SIL; 2 Ret	NÜR; 1; 21	NÜR; 2; 22	MAG; 1	MAG; 2	MUG; 1 Ret	MUG; 2 Ret	HOC; 1; 16	HOC; 2 Ret	INT; 1	INT; 2	SUZ; 1	SUZ; 2	30th	0

=== Complete Super Tourenwagen Cup results ===
(key) (Races in bold indicate pole position) (Races in italics indicate fastest lap)

Year	Team	Car	1	2	3	4	5	6	7	8	9	10	11	12	13	14	15	16	17	18	19	20	Pos.	Pts
1997	Cool Fire Team Engstler	Alfa Romeo 155 TS	HOC; 1	HOC; 2	ZOL; 1	ZOL; 2	NÜR; 1	NÜR; 2	SAC; 1	SAC; 2	NOR; 1	NOR; 2	WUN; 1	WUN; 2	ZWE; 1	ZWE; 2	SAL; 1 Ret	SAL; 2 DNS	REG; 1	REG; 2	NÜR; 1	NÜR; 2	37th	0

=== Complete International Superstars Series results ===
(key) (Races in bold indicate pole position) (Races in italics indicate fastest lap)

Year	Team	Car	1	2	3	4	5	6	7	8	9	10	11	12	13	14	15	16	Pos.	Pts
2010	Scuderia Giudici	BMW M5 (E39)	MNZ; R1	MNZ; R2	IMO; R1	IMO; R2	ALG; R1	ALG; R2	HOC; R1	HOC; R2	CPR; R1	CPR; R2	VAL; R1; DNS	VAL; R2; DNS	KYA; R1	KYA; R2			NC	0
2012	Scuderia Giudici	BMW M3 (E92)	MNZ; R1	MNZ; R2	IMO; R1; Ret	IMO; R2; DNS	DON; R1	DON; R2	MUG; R1; Ret	MUG; R2; DNS	HUN; R1; 11	HUN; R2; Ret	SPA; R1	SPA; R2	VAL; R1; 16	VAL; R2; DNS	PER; R1	PER; R2	34th	5
2013	Scuderia Giudici	BMW M3 (E92)	MNZ; R1; 13	MNZ; R2; DNS	BRN; R1; DNS	BRN; R2; DNS	SVK; R1	SVK; R2	ZOL; R1; Ret	ZOL; R2; DNS	ALG; R1; 12	ALG; R2; 10	DON; R1; 7	DON; R2; 9	IMO; R1; 12	IMO; R2; 11	VAL; R1; 13	VAL; R2; DNS	19th	16
2014	Scuderia Giudici	BMW M3 (E92)	MNZ; R1; Ret	MNZ; R2; DNS	VAL; R1	VAL; R2	MUG; R1; 9	MUG; R2; DNS	BRN; R1	BRN; R2	SAC; R1	HOC; R1							23rd	9
