= Klaus Ludwig =

German racing driver (born 1949)

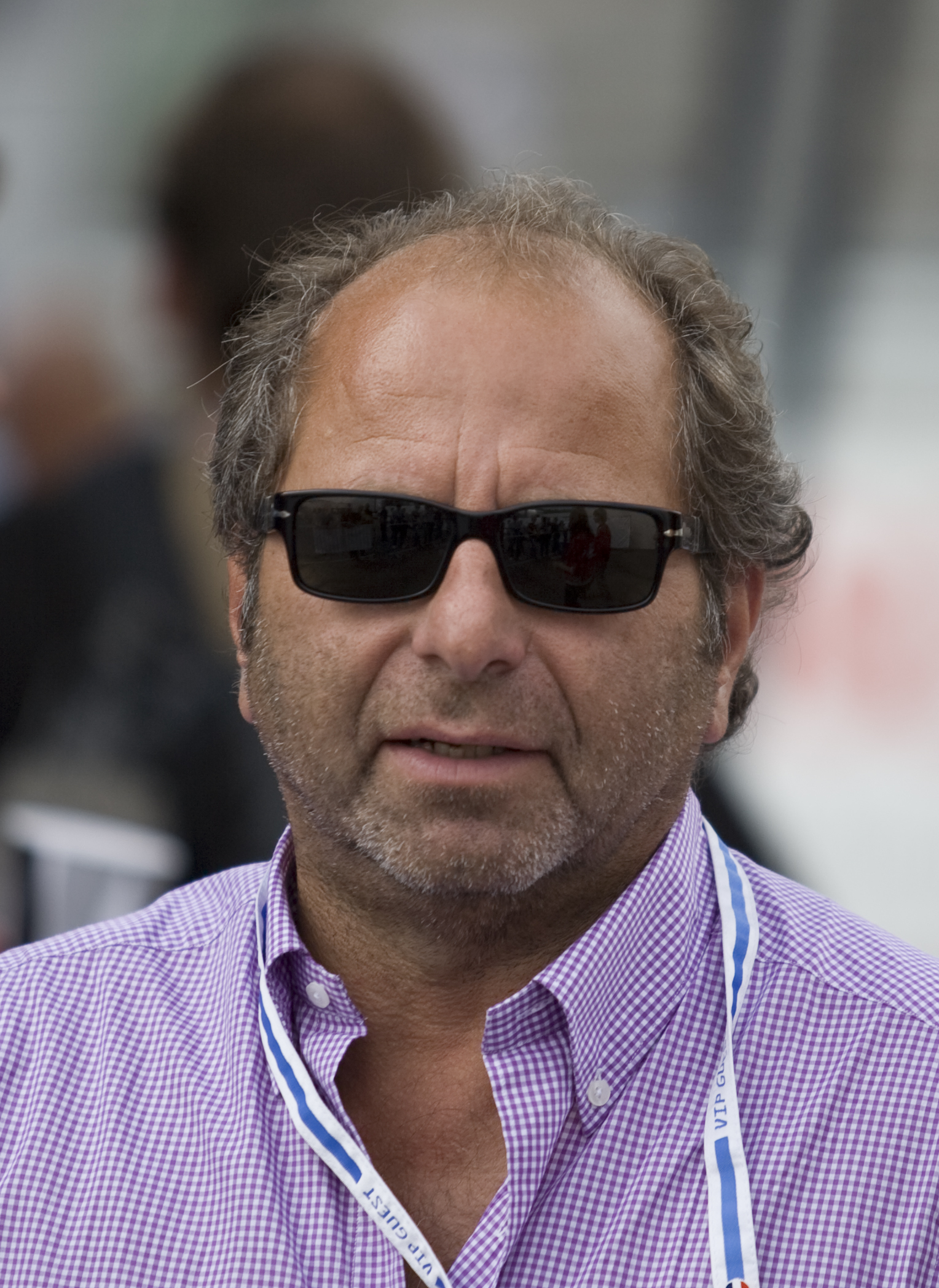
- Klaus Ludwig in 2009
- Nationality: (Germany) German
- Born: Klaus Karl Ludwig; 5 October 1949 (age 77) Bonn, West Germany
- Relatives: Luca Ludwig (son)

Deutsche Tourenwagen Masters
- Years active: 2000
- Former teams: HWA 2
- Starts: 16
- Wins: 2
- Podiums: 7
- Poles: 2
- Fastest laps: 0
- Best finish: 3rd in 2000

FIA GT Championship
- Years active: 1997–1998
- Former teams: AMG Mercedes; Kremer Racing
- Starts: 19
- Championships: 1 (1998)
- Wins: 9
- Podiums: 14
- Poles: 6
- Fastest laps: 5

International Touring Car Championship
- Years active: 1995–1996
- Former teams: Zakspeed Opel; Opel Team Rosberg
- Starts: 33
- Wins: 4
- Podiums: 8
- Poles: 4
- Fastest laps: 0
- Best finish: 7th in 1996

Deutsche Tourenwagen Meisterschaft
- Years active: 1985–1995
- Former teams: Opel Team Rosberg; AMG-Mercedes; Ford-Grab Motorsport; ABR Ringhausen Rennsport
- Starts: 173
- Championships: 3 (1988, 1992, 1994)
- Wins: 32
- Podiums: 67
- Poles: 23
- Fastest laps: 16

24 Hours of Le Mans career
- Years: 1978–1979, 1982–1986, 1988, 1998
- Teams: AMG-Mercedes; Porsche AG; Joest Racing; Zakspeed; Porsche Kremer Racing; Weisberg Gelo Team
- Best finish: 1st (1979, 1984, 1985)
- Class wins: 3 (1979, 1984, 1985)

Klaus Karl Ludwig (born 5 October 1949) is a German racing driver. He is a three-time winner of the 24 Hours of Le Mans for Porsche, a three-time Deutsche Tourenwagen Meisterschaft champion, and the 1998 FIA GT champion.

== Biography ==
Ludwig also known as König Ludwig ("King Ludwig") for his success in touring cars and in sports car racing.

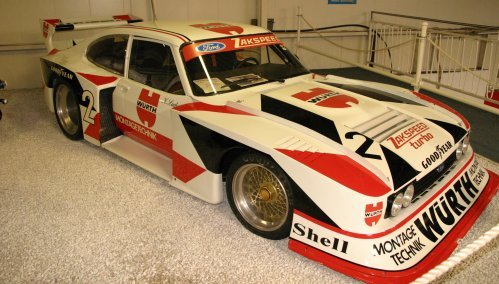
Klaus Ludwig's 1981 Group 5 Zakspeed Ford Capri at the Auto & Technik Museum in Sinsheim, Germany

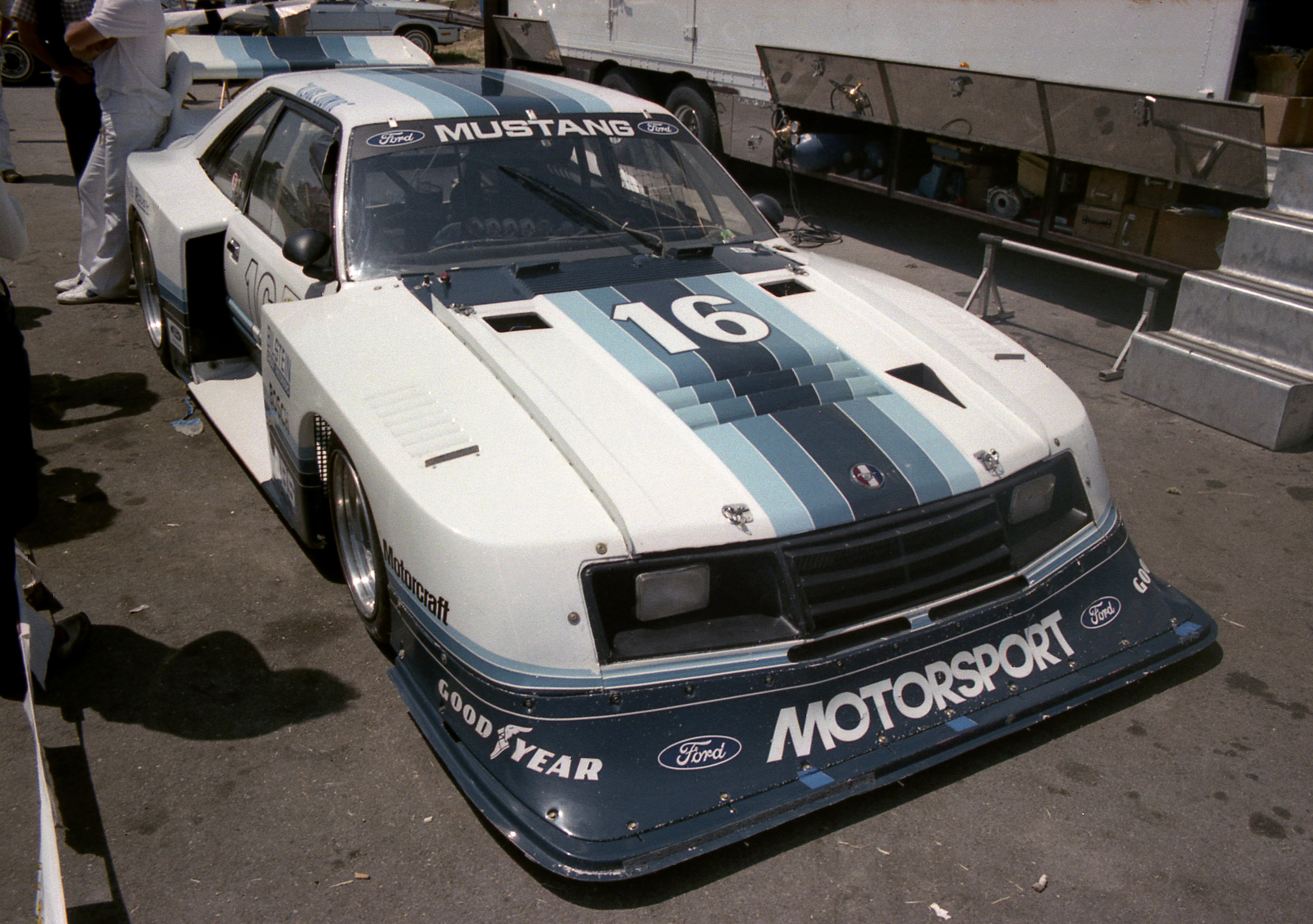
Ludwig drove the Roush-Zakspeed Ford Mustang Turbo during the 1981 and 1982 Camel GT race seasons.

In the 1970s, Ludwig drove for Ford in the Deutsche Rennsport Meisterschaft, winning in 1979 with a Kremer Racing-Porsche 935. With this car, based on the then 15-year-old Porsche 911 road car design, he won the 24 Hours of Le Mans overall in the wet, an unprecedented win against the faster pure sports car racing prototypes (though it was subsequently matched in 1995 when a McLaren F1 GTR won the race at its first attempt).

Ludwig won the Porsche Cup, an annual award presented by Porsche AG to recognize the world's most successful privateer racing driver competing with Porsche machinery in a customer racing team, in 1979 and 1986.

In 1984 and 1985, Ludwig won the 24 Hours of Le Mans for Joest Racing in their #7 Porsche 956. Considering Le Mans and sports cars too dangerous after the deaths of Manfred Winkelhock and Stefan Bellof, he was recruited for the 1987 World Touring Car Championship for Ford only to finish runner-up by a single point to BMW driver Roberto Ravaglia after a post-season disqualification (after Ludwig claimed the pole, he and fellow West German Klaus Niedzwiedz had finished second behind teammates Steve Soper and Pierre Dieudonné at the Bathurst 1000 in Australia, but both cars were disqualified due to illegal wheel arch size on their Ford Sierra RS500s). He then moved to the Deutsche Tourenwagen Meisterschaft (DTM), and became champion in 1988 in a Ford Sierra RS500. Ludwig also represented IMSA in the 1986 International Race of Champions, finishing eighth.

Ludwig repeated the success at Mercedes-Benz in 1992 and 1994, before moving back to sports cars racing for them in 1997 to become the 1998 FIA GT Champion. He retired when the series did not continue in the 1999 season.

Ludwig soon returned in June 1999, to win the 24 Hours Nürburgring on the Nordschleife for the third time driving a Zakspeed Viper.

When the DTM resumed as Deutsche Tourenwagen Masters in 2000, Ludwig returned to the series, winning at the age of 50 years at the Sachsenring circuit, only to retire once again.

Ludwig returned as a "hobby pilot" to the Nürburgring Nordschleife when given the opportunity to drive a high power vehicle. The years 2004 and 2005 saw him enter the 24 Hours Nürburgring with Uwe Alzen on the Jürgen Alzen Porsche 996 GT2 Bi-Turbo. With a normally aspirated Porsche 997 GT3 of the Alzen brothers, Ludwig and Christian Abt managed to beat the old distance record in the 2006 edition of the 24h, yet finished only second, one lap behind the winners.

Ludwig has also worked as a TV commentator on DTM races.

== Racing record ==
=== Achievements ===
- Winner 24 Hours of Le Mans: 1979, 1984, 1985
- Deutsche Rennsport Meisterschaft champion 1979, 1981
- Deutsche Tourenwagen Meisterschaft champion 1988, 1992, 1994
- FIA GT World Champion 1998

=== Complete European Formula Two Championship results ===
(key) (Races in bold indicate pole position; races in italics indicate fastest lap)

Year	Entrant	Chassis	Engine	1	2	3	4	5	6	7	8	9	10	11	12	13	Pos.	Pts
1976	Willi Kauhsen Racing Team	March 762	Hart	HOC; Ret	THR	VAL; 13	SAL	PAU; 7	HOC; 9	ROU	MUG; 9	PER	EST	NOG; 6	HOC; 10		12th	4
1977	Willi Kauhsen Racing Team	Jabouille 2J	Renault	SIL; Ret	THR; Ret	HOC; Ret	NÜR; 8	VAL; DSQ	PAU; 7	MUG	ROU	NOG	PER	MIS	EST		NC	0
1977	KWS Autotechnik	Chevron B40	Ford													DON; Ret	NC	0

=== Complete 24 Hours of Le Mans results ===
Year	Team	Co-Drivers	Car	Class	Laps	Pos.	Class Pos.
1978	(West Germany) Weisberg Gelo Team	(United Kingdom) John Fitzpatrick (Netherlands) Toine Hezemans	Porsche 935/77	Gr.5 +2.0	19	DNF	DNF
1979	(West Germany) Porsche Kremer Racing	(United States) Don Whittington (United States) Bill Whittington	Porsche 935 K3	Gr.5 +2.0	307	**1st**	**1st**
1982	(West Germany) Ford Germany (West Germany) Zakspeed	(Switzerland) Marc Surer (West Germany) Manfred Winkelhock	Ford C100	C	67	DNF	DNF
1983	(West Germany) Sorga S.A. Joest Racing	(Sweden) Stefan Johansson (France) Bob Wollek	Porsche 956	C	354	6th	6th
1984	(West Germany) New-Man Joest Racing	(France) Henri Pescarolo	Porsche 956B	C1	360	**1st**	**1st**
1985	(West Germany) New-Man Joest Racing	(Italy) Paolo Barilla (West Germany) Louis Krages	Porsche 956B	C1	374	**1st**	**1st**
1986	(West Germany) Joest Racing	(Italy) Paolo Barilla (West Germany) Louis Krages	Porsche 956B	C1	196	DNF	DNF
1988	(West Germany) Porsche AG	(West Germany) Hans-Joachim Stuck (United Kingdom) Derek Bell	Porsche 962C	C1	394	**2nd**	**2nd**
1998	(West Germany) AMG-Mercedes	(West Germany) Bernd Schneider (Australia) Mark Webber	Mercedes-Benz CLK-LM	GT1	19	DNF	DNF

=== Complete World Touring Car Championship results ===
(key) (Races in bold indicate pole position) (Races in italics indicate fastest lap)

Year	Team	Car	1	2	3	4	5	6	7	8	9	10	11	Pos.	Pts
1987	(Switzerland) Eggenberger Motorsport	Ford Sierra RS Cosworth	MNZ; DSQ	**JAR** ovr:4 cls:1	DIJ ovr:4 cls:4	NÜR ovr:1 cls:1	**SPA**; Ret							2nd	268
1987	(Switzerland) Eggenberger Motorsport	Ford Sierra RS500						**BRN** ovr:1 cls:1	SIL ovr:6 cls:1	**BAT**; DSQ	**CLD** ovr:12 cls:8	**WEL** ovr:1 cls:1	**FUJ** ovr:1 cls:1	2nd	268

* Overall positions shown. WTCC points paying positions may be different

=== Complete Deutsche Tourenwagen Meisterschaft/Masters results ===
(key) (Races in bold indicate pole position) (Races in italics indicate fastest lap)

Year	Team	Car	1	2	3	4	5	6	7	8	9	10	11	12	13	14	15	16	17	18	19	20	21	22	23	24	Pos.	Pts
1985	ABR Ringhausen Rennsport	Ford Sierra XR4 TI	ZOL	WUN	AVU	MFA	ERD	ERD	DIE; 12	DIE; 1	ZOL; 1	**SIE**; 1	**NÜR**; 1														11th	73.5
1986	ABR Ringhausen Rennsport	Ford Sierra XR4 TI	ZOL; Ret	HOC; 5	NÜR	AVU	MFA	WUN	NÜR; Ret	ZOL	NÜR																25th	14
1987	Ford-Grab Motorsport GmbH	Ford Sierra XR4 TI	HOC	ZOL	NÜR	AVU	MFA	NOR	NÜR; 1	WUN	DIE	SAL															NC	0
1988	Team Hein Gericke Ford Grab Motorsport	Ford Sierra RS 500 Cosworth	ZOL; 1; 1	**ZOL**; **2**; 1	HOC; 1; 10	HOC; 2; 8	NÜR; 1; 2	NÜR; 2; 5	BRN; 1; 2	BRN; 2; 2	AVU; 1 Ret	AVU; 2; 12	**MFA**; **1** Ret	MFA; 2; 9	NÜR; 1; 5	NÜR; 2; 4	**NOR**; **1**; 23	NOR; 2; 1	**WUN**; **1**; 1	**WUN**; **2**; 1	SAL; 1 C	SAL; 2 C	HUN; 1 Ret	HUN; 2 Ret	HOC; 1; 9	HOC; 2; 5	1st	258
1989	AMG Motorenbau GmbH	Mercedes 190E 2.3-16	ZOL; 1 Ret	ZOL; 2 DNS	**HOC**; **1**; 1	HOC; 2; 20	NÜR; 1; 3	NÜR; 2 Ret																			11th	155
1989	AMG Motorenbau GmbH	Mercedes 190E 2.5-16 Evo							MFA; 1 Ret	MFA; 2 DNS	AVU; 1; 3	AVU; 2; 10	**NÜR**; **1** DNS	NÜR; 2 DNS	NOR; 1	NOR; 2	HOC; 1 Ret	HOC; 2 DNS	DIE; 1; 1	**DIE**; **2**; 1	**NÜR**; **1**; 1	NÜR; 2; 1	HOC; 1; 5	HOC; 2 Ret			11th	155
1990	AMG Motorenbau GmbH	Mercedes 190E 2.5-16 Evo	ZOL; 1; 4	ZOL; 2; 2	**HOC**; **1**; 1	**HOC**; **2** Ret	NÜR; 1; 4	NÜR; 2; 3	AVU; 1; 9	AVU; 2 Ret	MFA; 1; 2	MFA; 2; 6	WUN; 1; 22	WUN; 2; 11													5th	140
1990	AMG Motorenbau GmbH	Mercedes 190E 2.5-16 Evo2													**NÜR**; **1** Ret	NÜR; 2; 15	NOR; 1; 4	NOR; 2; 4	DIE; 1; 7	DIE; 2; 6	NÜR; 1; 7	NÜR; 2; 7	HOC; 1; 5	HOC; 2; 7			5th	140
1991	AMG Motorenbau GmbH	Mercedes 190E 2.5-16 Evo2	ZOL; 1; 2	ZOL; 2; 14	HOC; 1; 7	HOC; 2; 7	NÜR; 1; 1	**NÜR**; **2**; 1	AVU; 1; 7	AVU; 2 Ret	WUN; 1; 3	WUN; 2; 3	NOR; 1 Ret	NOR; 2; 7	DIE; 1; 8	DIE; 2; 3	NÜR; 1; 1	**NÜR**; **2**; 1	ALE; 1; 9	ALE; 2 Ret	HOC; 1; 6	HOC; 2; 5	BRN; 1; 1	**BRN**; **2** Ret	DON; 1; 4	DON; 2; 4	2nd	166
1992	AMG Motorenbau GmbH	Mercedes 190E 2.5-16 Evo2	ZOL; 1; 2	ZOL; 2; 11	NÜR; 1; 7	NÜR; 2; 5	WUN; 1; 2	WUN; 2; 3	AVU; 1; 4	AVU; 2; 7	**HOC**; **1** Ret	HOC; 2; 2	NÜR; 1; 1	**NÜR**; **2**; 1	NOR; 1; 8	NOR; 2; 12	BRN; 1 Ret	BRN; 2; 4	**DIE**; **1**; 1	**DIE**; **2**; 1	ALE; 1 Ret	ALE; 2; 4	NÜR; 1; 4	NÜR; 2; 1	HOC; 1; 3	HOC; 2 Ret	**1st**	**228**
1993	AMG-Mercedes Berlin 2000	Mercedes 190E 2.5-16 93	ZOL; 1; 4	ZOL; 2; 7	HOC; 1 Ret		NÜR; 1; 3		WUN; 1; 5	WUN; 2; 3	NÜR; 1; 2	NÜR; 2; 3	NOR; 1 Ret	NOR; 2; 5	DON; 1; 6	DON; 2 Ret	DIE; 1; 3	DIE; 2; 2	ALE; 1; 5	ALE; 2 Ret	AVU; 1; 2	AVU; 2; 22	HOC; 1; 5	HOC; 2 Ret			4th	171
1993	AMG-Mercedes Berlin 2000	Mercedes 190E 2.5-16 Evo2				HOC; 2; 3		NÜR; 2; 1																			4th	171
1994	AMG Mercedes D2 Privat Team	Mercedes C-Class V6	ZOL; 1; 8	ZOL; 2; 5	HOC; 1; 5	HOC; 2; 8	NÜR; 1; 1	**NÜR**; **2**; 3	MUG; 1; 8	MUG; 2; 17	NÜR; 1; 2	NÜR; 2; 1	NOR; 1; 3	NOR; 2; 5	DON; 1; 20	DON; 2 DNS	DIE; 1; 1	**DIE**; **2**; 2	NÜR; 1; 2	NÜR; 2; 2	AVU; 1; 4	AVU; 2; 8	ALE; 1 Ret	ALE; 2; 4	HOC; 1; 2	HOC; 2; 4	**1st**	**222**
1995	Opel Team Rosberg	Opel Calibra V6 4x4	HOC; 1; 5	HOC; 2; 3	AVU; 1 Ret	AVU; 2 DNS	NOR; 1; 2	NOR; 2 Ret	DIE; 1 Ret	DIE; 2 Ret	NÜR; 1; 7	NÜR; 2; 10	ALE; 1 Ret	ALE; 2 DNS	HOC; 1; 1	**HOC**; **2**; 1											**3rd**	**80**
2000	HWA 2	AMG-Mercedes CLK-DTM	HOC; 1; 9	HOC; 2; 9	OSC; 1; 8	OSC; 2; 11	NOR; 1; 2	NOR; 2; 3	**SAC**; **1**; 1	**SAC**; **2**; 1	NÜR; 1; 2	NÜR; 2; 2	LAU; 1 C	LAU; 2 C	OSC; 1; 6	OSC; 2; 3	NÜR; 1; 12	NÜR; 2 Ret	HOC; 1 Ret	HOC; 2; 11							**3rd**	**122**

=== Complete International Touring Car Championship results ===
(key) (Races in bold indicate pole position) (Races in italics indicate fastest lap)

Year	Team	Car	1	2	3	4	5	6	7	8	9	10	11	12	13	14	15	16	17	18	19	20	21	22	23	24	25	26	Pos.	Pts
1995	Opel Team Rosberg	Opel Calibra V6 4x4	MUG; 1; 8	MUG; 2 Ret	HEL; 1; 15	HEL; 2 Ret	DON; 1; 8	DON; 2 Ret	EST; 1; 17	EST; 2; 8	MAG; 1; 3	MAG; 2 Ret																	14th	21
1996	Zakspeed Opel	Opel Calibra V6 4x4	HOC; 1 Ret	HOC; 2 DNS	NÜR; 1 Ret	NÜR; 2 Ret	EST; 1; 3	EST; 2; 11	HEL; 1; 3	HEL; 2 Ret	NOR; 1; 1	**NOR**; **2**; 1	DIE; 1 Ret	DIE; 2 Ret	**SIL**; **1**; 1	**SIL**; **2** Ret	NÜR; 1 Ret	NÜR; 2; 11	MAG; 1; 9	MAG; 2; 5	MUG; 1	MUG; 2	**HOC**; **1**; 1	**HOC**; **2**; 2	INT; 1 Ret	INT; 2; 18†	SUZ; 1 Ret	SUZ; 2; 10	7th	130
Sources:

- † — Retired, but was classified as he completed 90% of the winner's race distance.

Sporting positions
Preceded by Harald Ertl	Deutsche Rennsport Meisterschaft Champion; 1979	Succeeded by Hans Heyer
Preceded by Hans Heyer	Deutsche Rennsport Meisterschaft Champion; 1981	Succeeded by Bob Wollek
Preceded by Jean-Pierre Jaussaud; Didier Pironi	Winner of the 24 Hours of Le Mans; 1979 with: Bill Whittington; Don Whittington	Succeeded by Jean Rondeau; Jean-Pierre Jaussaud
Preceded by Vern Schuppan; Al Holbert; Hurley Haywood	Winner of the 24 Hours of Le Mans; 1984 with: Henri Pescarolo	Succeeded by Klaus Ludwig; Paolo Barilla; Louis Krages
Preceded by Klaus Ludwig; Henri Pescarolo	Winner of the 24 Hours of Le Mans; 1985 with: Paolo Barilla; Louis Krages	Succeeded by Derek Bell; Hans-Joachim Stuck; Al Holbert
Preceded by Eric van de Poele	German Touring Car Champion; 1988	Succeeded by Roberto Ravaglia
Preceded by Frank Biela	German Touring Car Champion; 1992	Succeeded by Nicola Larini
Preceded by Nicola Larini	German Touring Car Champion; 1994	Succeeded by Bernd Schneider
Preceded by Bernd Schneider	FIA GT Champion; 1998 with: Ricardo Zonta	Succeeded by Olivier Beretta; Karl Wendlinger
