= Alexander Grau =

German racing driver (born 1973)

- Nationality: (Germany) German
- Born: February 17, 1973 (age 53) Augsburg (Germany)

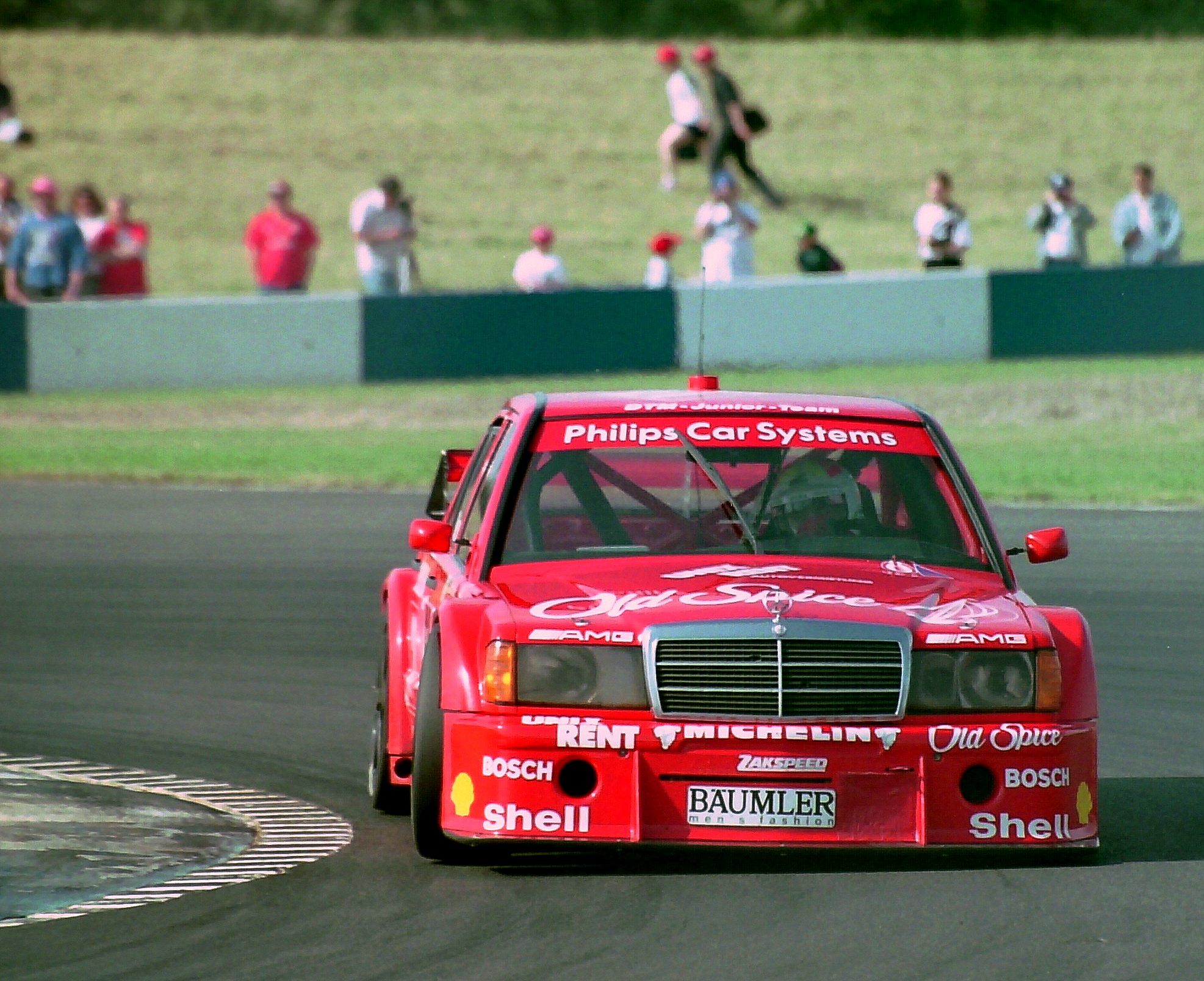
Grau driving the DTM Junior Team Mercedes-Benz 190E at Donington Park during the 1994 Deutsche Tourenwagen Meisterschaft season.

Alexander "Sandy" Grau (born February 17, 1973) is a German racing driver. He has competed in such series as Deutsche Tourenwagen Meisterschaft and the German Formula Three Championship.
