= Diepholz Air Base =

Diepholz Air Base Diepholz Airport Advanced Landing Ground (ALG) B-114

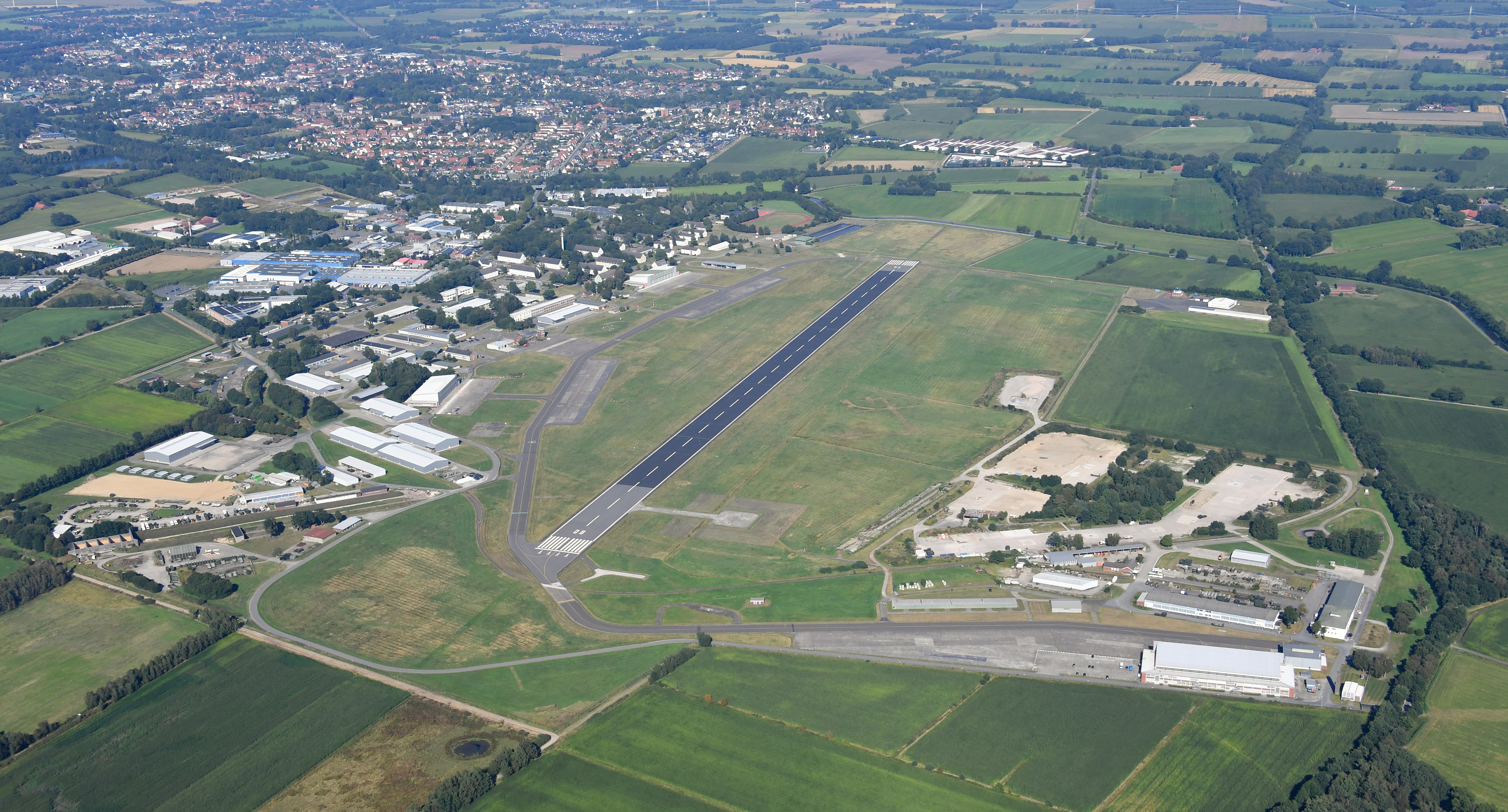

Site information
- Type: Civil/Military Airfield
- Controlled by: Bundeswehr (Air Force)

Location
- Coordinates: 52°35′07″N 008°20′27″E

Site history
- In use: 1936–present
- Battles/wars: World War II

Garrison information
- Occupants: Luftwaffe (National Socialist), 1936–1945; Royal Air Force, 1945; German Air Force (FRG), 1957–present

Airfield information
- IATA: none; ICAO: ETND

Summary
- Elevation AMSL: 127 ft (39 m)
- Coordinates: 52°35′07″N 008°20′27″E

Map
- Location of Diepholz Air Base

Runways
| Direction | Length | | Surface |
| Direction | ft | m | Surface |
|---|---|---|---|
| 08/26 | 4,209 | 1,283 | Asphalt |

Diepholz Air Base (ICAO: ETND) is a German Air Force military air base, located 3.3 km southwest of Diepholz in Lower Saxony, Germany. It is a joint-use civil-military facility, also being a civil airport.

Between 1968 and 1996, the Diepholz Airfield Circuit, a temporary motorsports venue, was regularly laid out on the airfield.

== Overview ==
Diepholz Air Base was home of 2nd Flying Group of Helicopter Transport Wing 64 from 1968 to 1971. It also housed various logistical units of the German Air Force.

== History ==
The airfield was originally opened in 1936 for Nazi Germany's Luftwaffe. During World War II, it was seized by the British Army in April 1945. After the battle, the base was over by the Royal Air Force and designated as Advanced Landing Ground B-114 Diepholz. After the war, the airfield was closed.

In 1957, the base was returned to the control of the German Air Force and became a NATO Air Base.

In October 2011, the German Federal Ministry of Defence announced a reorganisation/reduction of the German Armed Forces. As a consequence, the number of personnel stationed at Diepholz Air Base was reduced from 1,020 to 110, with the airbase facilities being only used as a material storage site.

=== Racing circuit ===
German racing suffered from a lack of permanent circuits after the war, and airfield venues sprang up to bolster events at the Nürburgring and Hockenheim. Diepholz was among the most popular and long-lasting. In 1968, the local motorsport-club AMC Diepholz organized the first "ADAC-Flugplatzrennen Diepholz" on the airfield. The circuit utilised the airfield runways linked by fast chicanes, lined by water-filled oil barrels and tyre stacks.

These races soon gathered momentum and in 1972 Diepholz was added to the prestigious DRM touring car championship. Throughout the rest of the 1970s, tin-top stars such as Frank Gardner, Hans Heyer, Toine Hezemans, Helmut Kelleners, Klaus Ludwig and Bob Wollek battled it out in BMWs, Porsches and Fords.

The airfield circuit was discontinued after 1998 due to the completion of a new permanent circuit, the Motorsport Arena Oschersleben.
