= Alfa Corse =

Alfa Romeo's factory racing team

(Italy) Alfa Corse
- Founded: 1938
- Base: Milan, Lombardy, Italy; Arese, Lombardy, Italy
- Former series: AIACR European Championship; Formula One; World Sportscar Championship; European Touring Car Championship; World Touring Car Championship; Italian Superturismo Championship; Deutsche Tourenwagen Meisterschaft; British Touring Car Championship
- Teams' Championships: 2 European Touring Car Championship (1984, 1985); 1 Italian Superturismo Championship (1992); 1 Deutsche Tourenwagen Meisterschaft (DTM) (1993)
- Drivers' Championships: 2 Formula One World Drivers' Championships (1950, 1951); 2 Italian Superturismo Championship (1988, 1992); 1 Deutsche Tourenwagen Meisterschaft (DTM) (1993); 1 British Touring Car Championship (1994)

Alfa Corse is Alfa Romeo's factory racing team. Throughout the years, Alfa Corse has competed in various forms of motorsport, from Grand Prix motor racing to touring car racing.

Alfa Corse was officially formed in the beginning of 1938, after the racing department was moved back from unofficial factory team Scuderia Ferrari to "il Portello". Enzo Ferrari was still in charge of department, but left one year later to build his own cars under the name Auto-Avio Costruzioni. From 1961 Alfa Romeo factory racing team was run by Autodelta.

Alfa Romeo was purchased by the Fiat Group in 1986, and in 1987, Giorgio Pianta was moved from the management of Abarth to restart Alfa Corse. After aborted attempts at producing the 164 Procar with Brabham and moving into the World Sports Prototype Championship, Alfa Corse settled on a return to touring car racing, starting with the Italian CIVT series, in 1992, with the 155 GTA. In 1993, Alfa Corse entered the DTM with the AWD V6-powered 155 TI, and created a Supertouring model, that would go on to win the Italian Superturismo, the BTCC and the Spanish Touring Car Championship.

Alfa Romeo withdrew from the DTM (renamed "International Touring Car Championship") at the end of 1996, and Pianta was replaced by Francesco Galletto. When the 156 replaced the 155, it was developed for Supertouring and Superproduction classes, racing in the European Touring Car Championship. In 2001, Alfa Corse merged with Mauro Sipsz's independent firm, Nordauto Engineering, to form N.Technology.

== See also ==
- Alfa Romeo in motorsport
- Autodelta
