= Alemannenring =

Former auto racing circuit

- Street Circuit (1991–1995)
- Location: Singen, Baden-Württemberg
- Coordinates: 47°45′20″N 8°52′25″E
- Capacity: 45,000
- Opened: 13 September 1991; 34 years ago
- Closed: 17 September 1995; 30 years ago
- Major events: DTM (1991–1995); German F3 (1992–1995); Porsche Carrera Cup Germany (1991, 1993–1995); Austria Formula 3 Cup (1994)

Street Circuit (1991–1995)
- Surface: Asphalt
- Length: 2.800 km (1.740 mi)
- Turns: 8
- Race lap record: 1:13.700 ( (Italy) Max Angelelli, Dallara F393, 1993, F3)

The Alemannenring was a former street circuit in Southern Germany. The circuit was located on public roads around in the industrial area of Singen in Baden-Württemberg. It hosted its final motor race in September 1995.

== Circuit ==
The circuit was 2.800 km (1.740 mi) long and based around a series of four lane wide roads in the town of Singen (Hohentweil). The circuit was 14 m (15 yd) wide, apart from on the start/finish straight where it decreased to 9 m (9.8 yd) due to the pitlane. The track featured eight turns, seven of which were 90-degree turns and the other a 180-degree hairpin turn. There was also a small chicaned section towards the end of the straight on Robert Gerwig Strasse. The track was similar to the Norisring, for its street profile, length and for having 8 turns.

== German Touring Car Events ==
The circuit hosted a Deutsche Tourenwagen Meisterschaft (DTM) event annually between 1991 and 1995, the only racing the street circuit ever saw.

=== DTM Victories ===
- 3 Victories: Nicola Larini (Alfa Romeo), Bernd Schneider (Mercedes Benz)
- 2 Victories: Kurt Thiim (Mercedes Benz)
- 1 Victory: Frank Biela (Audi), Hans-Joachim Stuck (Audi)

In 2009, a group known as Alemanni Ring eV attempted to revive the circuit to hold another DTM event. It would have been the first time the circuit held a DTM event in the series' new form as the Deutsche Tourenwagen Masters. Previously, the events had been held when the series was known as the Deutsche Tourenwagen Meisterschaft. The group encountered local governmental problems and the organisers of the DTM series decided against holding an event. The group have now disbanded but still maintain a website.

== Lap records ==
The fastest official race lap records at the Alemannenring are listed as:

Category	Time	Driver	Vehicle	Event
Street Circuit (1991–1995): 2.800 km (1.740 mi)
Formula Three	1:13.700	Max Angelelli	Dallara F393	1993 Alemannenring German F3 round
Class 1 Touring Cars	1:14.530	Dario Franchitti	Mercedes-Benz C-Klasse V6	1995 Alemannenring DTM round
Group A	1:18.160	Bernd Schneider	Mercedes 190E 2.5-16 Evo2	1992 Alemannenring DTM round
