= Zakspeed 1500/4 =

Overview
- Manufacturer: (West Germany) Zakspeed
- Designer: (West Germany) Norbert Kreyer
- Production: 1985–1988

Layout
- Configuration: 80° L4
- Displacement: 1.5 L (1,495 cc)
- Cylinder bore: 90.4 mm (3.6 in)
- Piston stroke: 58.25 mm (2.3 in)
- Compression ratio: 1985–1987: 7.5:1; 1988: 8.0:1

Combustion
- Turbocharger: Garrett or KKK
- Fuel system: Electronic fuel injection Bosch–Motronic engine management system
- Fuel type: Gasoline (Shell)
- Cooling system: Water-cooled

Output
- Power output: 640–1,000 bhp (477–746 kW; 649–1,014 PS)

Dimensions
- Dry weight: 125 kg (275.6 lb)

The Zakspeed 1500/4 was a turbocharged straight-4 racing engine developed by privateer German team Zakspeed. The engine was used exclusively by Zakspeed in Formula One from 1985 to 1988. Zakspeed had been hoping to have the backing of Ford with their project after an association with them while running turbocharged Ford Escort and Capri models in Group 2 and Group 5 racing, but decided to go it alone after Ford chose to remain with their major partner, British engineering company Cosworth.

The Zakspeed engine was one of two German made 4 cylinder turbo's in Formula One at the time, with the other coming from BMW who had won the World Championship with Nelson Piquet and the Brabham team in 1983.

It was rumoured that Zakspeed's engine block was based on the Cosworth designed and built Ford BDA block used in the Ford Escorts that the team knew well, though in truth it was an entirely new aluminium block designed for the team by West German engineer Norbert Kreyer. Cosworth themselves had unsuccessfully tried to turbocharge the BDA for F1 in mid-late 1984 before settling on an all new, 120° V6 turbo in partnership with Ford.

== History ==
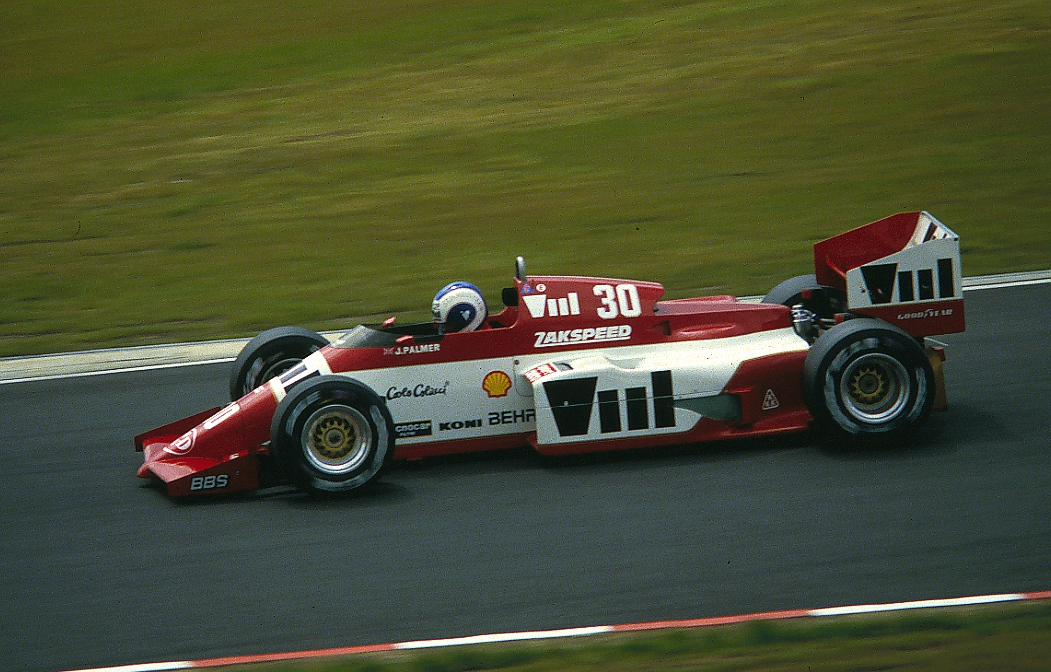
The first Zakspeed 1500/4 engine was in the 841 seen here driven by Dr. Jonathan Palmer at the 1985 German Grand Prix held at Zakspeed's home track, the Nürburgring

The 1.5 L (1,495 cc), 125 kg (275.6 lb) aluminium block and head engine used a Bosch–Motronic engine management system and whose power topped out at approximately 1,000 bhp (746 kW; 1,014 PS) at 11,500 rpm in 1986, though at that level of power, the reliability of both the engine and turbos was largely lamentable. The 1500/4 (so named as it was a 1.5L, 4 cylinder engine) was somewhat underdeveloped compared to its turbocharged rivals from the large manufacturers in Honda, Ferrari, Renault, BMW, TAG-Porsche and Ford-Cosworth, and was more on par with other independent Formula One engine manufacturers of the original turbo era (1977–1988) such as those from British independent engineering firm Hart Racing Engines (the Hart 415T engine was Formula One's first 4-cylinder turbo, first appearing in 1981) or the Italian Motori Moderni V6 engine designed by former Alfa Romeo Chief Engineer Carlo Chiti.

Fuel for the Zakspeed engine was supplied by associate sponsors Shell and like most F1 racing fuels of the time was a mixture of toluene and methanol that was often referred to at the time as rocket fuel or jungle juice.

When Zakspeed first entered Formula One in 1985 and announced that it would be using its own engines, it was thought they could be as big as either of the then three major manufacturers in the sport with their own teams, Ferrari, Alfa Romeo and Renault (though Alfa's competition department Autodelta actually outsourced to Italian outfit EuroRacing who ran the Alfa Romeo team with full factory backing). However, the reality was that despite the team having was many incorrectly believed to be a very lucrative sponsorship deal from German cigarette brand West who also had naming rights with the team, Zakspeed neither had the budget nor the resources or expertise to become a front runner in F1 and the sight of a Zakspeed turbo with a plume of white smoke trailing behind it signalling either engine or turbo failure became a common sight on the worlds F1 tracks for the four years the team ran with its own engine. While it was rumoured that McLaren and Lotus were getting around $20–30 million from their cigarette sponsors Marlboro and Camel respectively allowing for much more development testing of their cars and engines, Zakspeed's budget rarely even included the money to go testing. Indeed, in 1986, Zakspeed even had to take on Dutch driver Huub Rothengatter largely because his own personal sponsorship paid the team for the drive.

The only Formula One World Championship points scored by the team and its 4-cylinder engine was two by British driver Martin Brundle for finishing fifth at the 1987 San Marino Grand Prix. Brundle only drove for the team in that 1987 season.

By the end of its racing life at the end of the 1988 season, Zakspeed was one of only six teams still using turbo power with the turbo boost reduction to 2.5 Bar and the fuel limit reduced to just 150 litres. However, despite having comparable power to the other turbos on the grid (the Honda V6 powering McLaren and Lotus, the Ferrari V6, the Alfa Romeo V8 and the BMW 4 cylinder which by 1988 was called a Megatron), that is where the comparisons stopped. While the Honda powered McLaren drivers Ayrton Senna and Alain Prost raced to 15 wins from 16 races, and 15 pole positions easily winning both the Drivers' (Senna) and Constructors' titles that year (with Ferrari's Gerhard Berger getting the other win and pole position), Zakspeed failed to qualify 17 times from the combined 32 attempts (including 6 races where neither car actually qualified) and could only finish a best of 12th at their home Grand Prix at the Hockenheimring in Germany.

The low point of the 1988 season which showed out Zakspeed's problems with their car and engine was their double non-qualification at the ultra fast Silverstone Circuit for the British Grand Prix. At a power circuit which should have suited their greater turbo power, the Zakspeed's of Piercarlo Ghinzani and rookie driver Bernd Schneider were 0.516 seconds (Ghinzani) and 2.483 seconds (Schneider) respectively slower than the 26th and last placed qualifier, Nicola Larini in the Osella with its outdated Alfa Romeo based V8 turbo.

With FISA banning turbos from the end of the 1988 season, Zakspeed retired its own engine in favour of using a brand new, 3.5L Yamaha V8 engine power from 1989.

== Power ==
The engine power figures by year were quoted as such:

1985:
Qualifying - 900 bhp (671 kW; 912 PS)
Race - 820 bhp (611 kW; 831 PS)

1986:
Qualifying - 1,000 bhp (746 kW; 1,014 PS)
Race - 850 bhp (634 kW; 862 PS)

1987 (4.0 Bar turbo limited):
Qualifying - 920 bhp (686 kW; 933 PS)
Race - 850 bhp (634 kW; 862 PS)

1988 (2.5 Bar turbo limited):
Qualifying - 640 bhp (477 kW; 649 PS)
Race - 600 bhp (447 kW; 608 PS)

== Formula One World Championship results ==
Year	Entrants	Chassis	Tyres	Drivers	1	2	3	4	5	6	7	8	9	10	11	12	13	14	15	16	Points	WCC
1985	West Zakspeed Racing	841	G		BRA	POR	SMR	MON	CAN	DET	FRA	GBR	GER	AUT	NED	ITA	BEL	EUR	RSA	AUS	0	NC
1985	West Zakspeed Racing	841	G	(United Kingdom) Jonathan Palmer		Ret	DNS	11			Ret	Ret	Ret	Ret	Ret						0	NC
1985	West Zakspeed Racing	841	G	(West Germany) Christian Danner													Ret	Ret			0	NC
1986	West Zakspeed Racing	861	G		BRA	ESP	SMR	MON	BEL	CAN	DET	FRA	GBR	GER	HUN	AUT	ITA	POR	MEX	AUS	0	NC
1986	West Zakspeed Racing	861	G	(United Kingdom) Jonathan Palmer	Ret	Ret	Ret	12	13	Ret	8	Ret	9	Ret	10	Ret	Ret	12	10	9	0	NC
1986	West Zakspeed Racing	861	G	(Netherlands) Huub Rothengatter			Ret	DNQ	Ret	12	DNS	Ret	Ret	Ret	Ret	8	Ret	Ret	DNS	Ret	0	NC
1987	West Zakspeed Racing	861; 871	G		BRA	SMR	BEL	MON	DET	FRA	GBR	GER	HUN	AUT	ITA	POR	ESP	MEX	JPN	AUS	2*	10th
1987	West Zakspeed Racing	861; 871	G	(United Kingdom) Martin Brundle	Ret	5	Ret	7	Ret	Ret	NC	NC	Ret	DSQ	Ret	Ret	11	Ret	Ret	Ret	2*	10th
1987	West Zakspeed Racing	861; 871	G	(West Germany) Christian Danner	9	7	Ret	EX	8	Ret	Ret	Ret	Ret	9	9	Ret	Ret	Ret	Ret	7	2*	10th
1988	West Zakspeed Racing	881	G		BRA	SMR	MON	MEX	CAN	DET	FRA	GBR	GER	HUN	BEL	ITA	POR	ESP	JPN	AUS	0	NC
1988	West Zakspeed Racing	881	G	(Italy) Piercarlo Ghinzani	DNQ	Ret	Ret	15	14	DNQ	DSQ	DNQ	14	DNQ	Ret	Ret	DNQ	DNQ	DNQ	Ret	0	NC
1988	West Zakspeed Racing	881	G	(West Germany) Bernd Schneider	DNQ	DNQ	DNQ	Ret	DNQ	DNQ	Ret	DNQ	12	DNQ	13	Ret	DNQ	DNQ	Ret	DNQ	0	NC

* points scored in 1987 were using the 871 Chassis
