= Zakspeed 881 =

Formula One Car

- Category: Formula One
- Constructor: Zakspeed
- Designers: Chris Murphy; Heinz Zollner
- Predecessor: 871
- Successor: 891

Technical specifications
- Chassis: Carbon fibre monocoque
- Suspension (front): Double wishbones, pullrods
- Suspension (rear): Double wishbones, pullrods
- Axle track: Front: 1,810 mm (71 in); Rear: 1,617 mm (63.7 in)
- Wheelbase: 2,830 mm (111 in)
- Engine: Zakspeed 1500/4 1,495 cc (91.2 cu in), Straight 4, turbo (2.5 Bar limited), mid-engine, longitudinally mounted
- Transmission: Hewland / Zakspeed 6-speed manual
- Weight: 560 kg (1,230 lb)
- Fuel: Shell
- Tyres: Goodyear

Competition history
- Notable entrants: West Zakspeed Racing
- Notable drivers: 9. (Italy) Piercarlo Ghinzani; 10. (West Germany) Bernd Schneider
- Debut: 1988 Brazilian Grand Prix
- Last event: 1988 Australian Grand Prix
Races	Wins	Poles	F/Laps
16	0	0	0
- Constructors' Championships: 0
- Drivers' Championships: 0

The Zakspeed 881 was a Formula One car designed by Chris Murphy and Heinz Zollner and raced by Zakspeed in the 1988 Formula One World Championship. The car was the last to be powered by the team's own 1.5-litre straight-4 turbo engine, the 1500/4. It was driven by Italian veteran Piercarlo Ghinzani and West German rookie Bernd Schneider.

The 881 was a development of the team's 1987 car, the 871, and was a largely unsuccessful car in the last year for turbos in Formula One. Both Ghinzani and Schneider, who replaced 1987 drivers Martin Brundle and Christian Danner, struggled all season to qualify the car even against the slower atmospheric cars. A glaring example of this was at Silverstone for the British Grand Prix. At the fastest circuit on the calendar that should have suited the turbo powered cars, both Ghinzani and Schneider failed to qualify, the Zakspeeds being the only turbo cars not to do so. The 881 was also unreliable, often blowing either the engine or the turbo many times over a race weekend. Neither Zakspeed driver scored a point in 1988, which meant the team was forced to pre-qualify in 1989.

The 881 was the last F1 car in which Zakspeed used their own engines which were rated at about 640 bhp (477 kW; 649 PS) for the season. While this made the engine one of the most powerful in the field, being only about 10 bhp shy of both the Honda and Ferrari V6 engines, and around the same as the other straight 4 turbo in the field, the Megatrons used by Arrows, that is where the similarities ended. Honda powered McLaren to 15 wins and 15 pole positions during the season, with the other win and pole going to Ferrari. Ghinzani failed to qualify on seven occasions while Schneider failed to qualify ten times. Something that did not help the team's cause was the weight of the car. The 881 weighed in at 560 kg (1,230 lb), this was around 20 kg (44 lb) heavier than the McLaren MP4/4, Ferrari F1/87/88C and the Honda powered Lotus 100T.

Bernd Schneider recorded the team's best finish for the year when he finished 12th in his and the team's home race in Germany at Hockenheim. The German rookie had to wait until Round 4 in Mexico to qualify for his first race. There at the Autodromo Hermanos Rodriguez in the high altitude of Mexico City where the thinner air gave the turbos a massive power advantage over their atmospheric rivals (the 'atmos' lost a reported 25% of their power at altitude while the turbos lost around 5%), Schneider qualified in an encouraging 15th place and ran well early on the edge of the top 10 until retiring with engine failure on lap 16.

The 881's replacement, the Zakspeed 891, would be powered by a Yamaha V8 engine.

== Complete Formula One results ==
(key)

Year	Team	Engine	Tyres	Drivers	1	2	3	4	5	6	7	8	9	10	11	12	13	14	15	16	Pts.	WCC
1988	West Zakspeed Racing	Zakspeed 1500/4; S4 tc	G		BRA	SMR	MON	MEX	CAN	DET	FRA	GBR	GER	HUN	BEL	ITA	POR	ESP	JPN	AUS	0	NC
1988	West Zakspeed Racing	Zakspeed 1500/4; S4 tc	G	Piercarlo Ghinzani	DNQ	Ret	Ret	15	14	DNQ	DSQ	DNQ	14	DNQ	Ret	Ret	DNQ	DNQ	DNQ	Ret	0	NC
1988	West Zakspeed Racing	Zakspeed 1500/4; S4 tc	G	Bernd Schneider	DNQ	DNQ	DNQ	Ret	DNQ	DNQ	Ret	DNQ	12	DNQ	13	Ret	DNQ	DNQ	Ret	DNQ	0	NC
