= Zakspeed 841 =

Formula One car for 1985 season

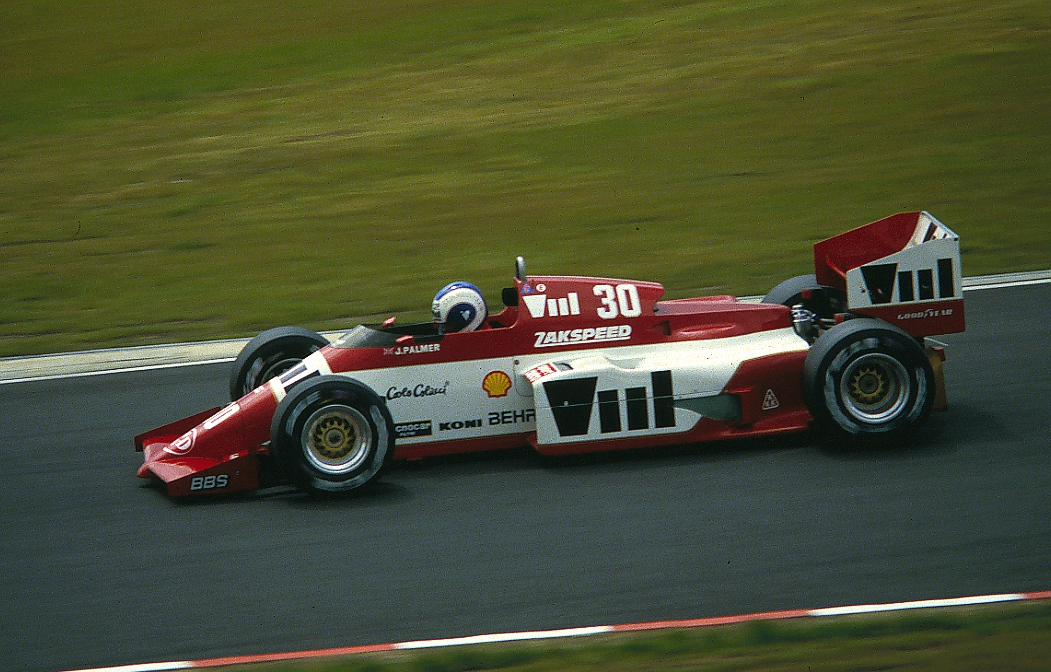
- Jonathan Palmer driving the 841 at the 1985 German Grand Prix
- Category: Formula One
- Constructor: Zakspeed
- Designer: Paul Brown
- Successor: 861

Technical specifications
- Chassis: Carbon fibre Monocoque
- Suspension (front): Double wishbone, inboard springs
- Suspension (rear): Pullrod
- Axle track: Front: 1,800 mm (71 in); Rear: 1,600 mm (63 in)
- Wheelbase: 2,820 mm (111 in)
- Engine: Zakspeed 1500/4 1,495 cc (91.2 cu in), Straight 4, turbo, mid-engine, longitudinally mounted
- Transmission: Hewland / Zakspeed 6-speed manual
- Weight: 565 kg (1,246 lb)
- Fuel: Shell
- Tyres: Goodyear

Competition history
- Notable entrants: West Zakspeed Racing
- Notable drivers: 30. (United Kingdom) Jonathan Palmer; 31. (Germany) Christian Danner
- Debut: 1985 Portuguese Grand Prix
- Last event: 1985 European Grand Prix
Races	Wins	Poles	F/Laps
10	0	0	0
- Constructors' Championships: 0
- Drivers' Championships: 0

The Zakspeed 841 was the first Formula One car built and raced by the German Zakspeed team for the 1985 season. Lead driver was British driver Jonathan Palmer with Formula 3000 driver Christian Danner from Germany joining the team later in the season. The 841 was designed by Paul Brown.

== Concept ==
Zakspeed was already an established racing and tuning company, working in conjunction with Ford. The team decided to enter Formula One in 1985 with their own turbo-charged engine; the factory-backed Alfa Romeo, Ferrari, and Renault teams were the only other outfits to build both their chassis and engines at this time. It was the first all-German (engine and chassis) F1 car since the Porsche 804 in 1962. The small size of the team limited it to building just two chassis during the course of the season, which also meant that only one car would be entered for contested events. For financial reasons, the team would not travel out of Europe, limiting itself to a maximum of eleven out of the sixteen Grands Prix. The 841 was designed by Paul Brown, with the 4-in-line engine designed by Norbert Kreyer. Two chassis were built, with the second only being finished in time for the French Grand Prix, the seventh round of the championship. The finished package was generally agreed to be neat and tidy (if conventional), especially in the red-and-white corporate colours of West, the team's title sponsor.

The car's designation of "841" shows that the car itself was already behind the times when it started. The 841 was intended to be used by Zakspeed for their entry into Formula One in the 1984 season. However, the project fell behind due to a lack of funds and only began competing in 1985.

Zakspeed's own turbo engine, reportedly based on a Ford block, produced approximately 820 bhp (611 kW; 831 PS) in race trim and 900 bhp (671 kW; 912 PS) for qualifying during the 1985 season. This generally put them behind the leading engines of BMW, Ferrari, Renault, Honda and the Porsche built TAG which were producing around and sometimes over 1,000 bhp (746 kW; 1,014 PS) in qualifying while having around 900+ bhp for races. However the 1500/4 did develop more power than the straight-4 Hart turbo, the Motori Moderni V6 and the Alfa Romeo 890T V8.

== Racing history ==
Zakspeed's plan for 1985 was more a toe in the water exercise. The team only raced in the rounds of the championship which were held in Europe. Zakspeed did not enter for the fly away races in Brazil, Canada, USA, South Africa and Australia.

The Zakspeed team made its début with the 841 in the second race of the season at the 1985 Portuguese Grand Prix, having missed the opening race in Brazil. Former RAM driver Jonathan Palmer drove the car and took 23rd place in qualifying. In the race, however, he collided with Williams' Keke Rosberg at the start, terminally damaging the suspension. At the next race in San Marino, Palmer qualified a highly respectable 17th, but failed to take the start with an engine misfire. The following race at Monaco brought the 841 its first finish in 11th place. However, this would be the team's only finish in 1985, as a series of mechanical problems led to Palmer retiring from the next five consecutive races in which he took part.

The car's performance also failed to improve, with Palmer consistently qualifying outside the top twenty. The team was then forced to miss the Italian GP after Palmer broke his leg in a sports car accident at Spa, but managed to compete in two further races with the 1985 Formula 3000 champion Christian Danner taking his place.

As the final two races of the season were outside Europe, Zakspeed did not take part and turned its attention to designing and building the 861 chassis for the 1986 season.

== Complete Formula One results ==
(key)

Year	Team	Engine	Tyres	Drivers	1	2	3	4	5	6	7	8	9	10	11	12	13	14	15	16	Pts.	WCC
1985	West Zakspeed Racing	Zakspeed 1500/4; S4 tc	G		BRA	POR	SMR	MON	CAN	DET	FRA	GBR	GER	AUT	NED	ITA	BEL	EUR	RSA	AUS	0	NC
1985	West Zakspeed Racing	Zakspeed 1500/4; S4 tc	G	Jonathan Palmer		Ret	DNS	11			Ret	Ret	Ret	Ret	Ret						0	NC
1985	West Zakspeed Racing	Zakspeed 1500/4; S4 tc	G	Christian Danner													Ret	Ret			0	NC
