= Zakspeed 861 =

Formula One car

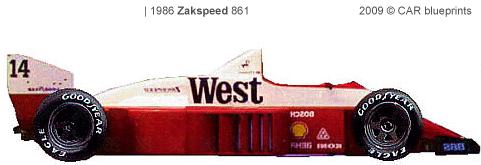
- Category: Formula One
- Constructor: Zakspeed
- Designer: Paul Brown
- Predecessor: 841
- Successor: 871

Technical specifications
- Chassis: Carbon fibre Monocoque
- Suspension (front): Double wishbones, pullrods
- Suspension (rear): Double wishbones, pullrods
- Axle track: Front: 1,800 mm (71 in); Rear: 1,600 mm (63 in)
- Wheelbase: 2,820 mm (111 in)
- Engine: Zakspeed 1500/4 1,495 cc (91.2 cu in), Straight 4, turbo, mid-engine, longitudinally mounted 1987: 4.0 Bar turbo limited
- Transmission: Hewland / Zakspeed 6-speed manual
- Weight: 565 kg (1,246 lb)
- Fuel: Shell
- Tyres: Goodyear

Competition history
- Notable entrants: West Zakspeed Racing
- Notable drivers: (United Kingdom) Jonathan Palmer (Netherlands) Huub Rothengatter (United Kingdom) Martin Brundle (Germany) Christian Danner
- Debut: 1986 Brazilian Grand Prix
- Last event: 1987 Spanish Grand Prix
| Races | Wins | Poles | F/Laps |
|---|---|---|---|
| 19 | 0 | 0 | 0 |
- Constructors' Championships: 0
- Drivers' Championships: 0

The Zakspeed 861 was a Formula One car designed by Paul Brown for the Zakspeed team and was used in both the 1986 and 1987 seasons. In 1986 its drivers were Jonathan Palmer and Huub Rothengatter. The team did not employ a test driver as they could not afford one, despite sponsorship from German tobacco brand West. The lack of money also meant that the car's engine, Zakspeed's own 4 cylinder 1500/4 turbocharged power unit, which was rated at about 850 bhp (634 kW; 862 PS) for the season, was also short on power and development compared to those at the front of the grid (Honda, Renault, BMW, TAG-Porsche and Ferrari). The team used Goodyear tyres.

== Concept ==
The Zakspeed 861 was a single seater open-wheel racing car, designed and built by the German Zakspeed team for the 1986 Formula One world championship. It was a development of the Zakspeed 841 used during the 1985 Formula One season. Changes were largely to reduce weight and complexity over its predecessor. In its second year in Formula One, the tiny Zakspeed team continued to be the only competitor, other than the large factory teams of Ferrari and Renault, to design and build its own engines.

== Chassis and suspension ==
The chassis was built around a carbon fibre/kevlar composite monocoque. The reduction in fuel tank size to 195 litres for the 1986 season allowed the car to be smaller, permitting better airflow to the rear wing for increased downforce and grip. Despite the efforts to reduce weight, the car, although close to the 575 kg minimum weight limit for the formula, was still too heavy. The car again appeared in the red-and-white corporate colours of West cigarettes, which remained as the title sponsor.

The suspension was double wishbone all round, operating springs and dampers by pullrods. The car started the season with conventional steel brakes, but Zakspeed experimented with carbon-carbon brakes from Monaco and raced them from Germany. The team continued its tyre supply contract from American firm Goodyear.

Despite the improvements over the 841, by the end of the year the chassis, whose concept dated back to 1983, was considered outdated. Technical director Helmut Barth commented that "It was too big and had too much drag".

== Engine and transmission ==
The Zakspeed designed 1.5 litre turbocharged engine shared its inline-4 layout with the Hart and BMW engines, of which by 1986 only the BMW (with the Benetton team) was still competitive (the Hart engine was not seen in F1 after the 1986 San Marino Grand Prix). Like both those engines, the Zakspeed was mounted semi-stressed in a spaceframe cradle. The year was dominated by the bespoke V6 engines of Honda and TAG-Porsche. During the 1985 season, the team had worked on developing their own electronic fuel injection system, while using a mechanical injection system in races. For the 1986 season, the team reached an agreement to use a low pressure Bosch Motronic electronic fuel injection system, originally intended for Alfa Romeo's stillborn inline-four turbo. This improved throttle response, drivability and fuel consumption. In race trim the engine was reported to exploit pressure of around 3.6 bar, roughly 3.6 times atmospheric pressure, which corresponded to about 850 bhp (634 kW; 862 PS). In qualifying, boost could be raised as high as 4.5 bar, with correspondingly greater power (approximately 1,000 bhp (746 kW; 1,014 PS)). These figures are comparable to that year's championship winning McLaren MP4/2-TAG/Porsche, which officially produced 850 bhp at 3.3 bar in race trim, although the TAG unit was far from the most powerful in Formula One that season (that title belonged to the special BMW qualifying engines which produced a reported 1,400 bhp (1,044 kW; 1,419 PS)).

The transmission was carried over from the 841, with an in-house magnesium alloy casing containing modified Hewland DGB internals.

== Racing history ==
During the team's part-time entry to the 1985 season, they had entered a single car for Jonathan Palmer at only the European and British races. For 1986 the team's original intention was to continue with one car for Palmer, but Huub Rothengatter, who brought funding to the team, was entered in a second chassis from early in the year. Ten finishes were recorded by the two drivers during the year, the best of them an eighth-place finish for Palmer at Detroit, and another for Rothengatter in Austria. The 861 chassis were used in the first two races of the 1987 season, while the team's new 871 was readied. A single 861 was used as a spare until the 1987 Detroit Grand Prix, where Martin Brundle raced it after crashing his 871 in practice. He retired from the race with turbo failure.

During the 1986 season it was generally felt that although Rothengatter brought money to the team, the cost of running two cars actually hindered the development of the 861 as it did not allow the team to do as much testing as they would have liked.

== Complete Formula One results ==
(key)

| Year | Team | Engine | Tyres | Drivers | 1 | 2 | 3 | 4 | 5 | 6 | 7 | 8 | 9 | 10 | 11 | 12 | 13 | 14 | 15 | 16 | Pts. | WCC |
|---|---|---|---|---|---|---|---|---|---|---|---|---|---|---|---|---|---|---|---|---|---|---|
| 1986 | West Zakspeed Racing | Zakspeed 1500/4; S4 tc | G | | BRA | ESP | SMR | MON | BEL | CAN | DET | FRA | GBR | GER | HUN | AUT | ITA | POR | MEX | AUS | 0 | NC |
| 1986 | West Zakspeed Racing | Zakspeed 1500/4; S4 tc | G | Jonathan Palmer | Ret | Ret | Ret | 12 | 13 | Ret | 8 | Ret | 9 | Ret | 10 | Ret | Ret | 12 | 10 | 9 | 0 | NC |
| 1986 | West Zakspeed Racing | Zakspeed 1500/4; S4 tc | G | Huub Rothengatter | | | Ret | DNQ | Ret | 12 | DNS | Ret | Ret | Ret | Ret | 8 | Ret | Ret | DNS | Ret | 0 | NC |
| 1987 | West Zakspeed Racing | Zakspeed 1500/4; S4 tc | G | | BRA | SMR | BEL | MON | DET | FRA | GBR | GER | HUN | AUT | ITA | POR | ESP | MEX | JPN | AUS | 2* | 10th |
| 1987 | West Zakspeed Racing | Zakspeed 1500/4; S4 tc | G | Martin Brundle | Ret | | | | Ret | | | | | | | | | | | | 2* | 10th |
| 1987 | West Zakspeed Racing | Zakspeed 1500/4; S4 tc | G | Christian Danner | 9 | 7 | | | | | | | | | | | | | | | 2* | 10th |

* All 1987 points scored using Zakspeed 871
