= Erich Zakowski =

German racing team owner (1933–2023)

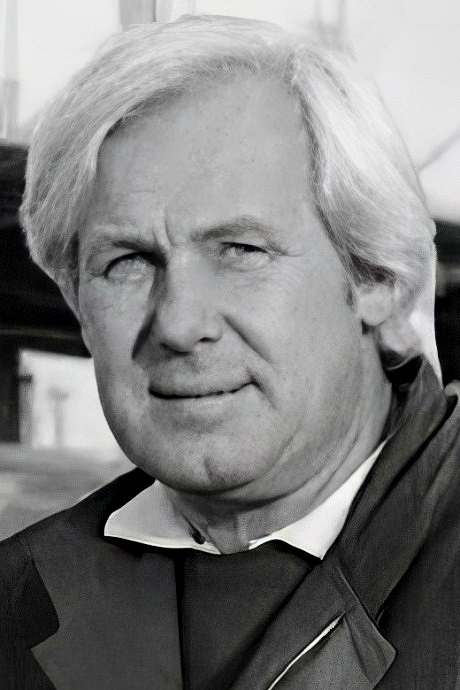
- Zakowski in 1983
- Born: 25 November 1933; Allenstein, East Prussia, Prussia, Germany
- Died: 1 November 2023 (aged 89); Balkhausen, Germany
- Occupation: Mechanic
- Known for: Head of Zakspeed (1968–1990)

Erich Zakowski (25 November 1933 – 1 November 2023) was a German mechanic with master craftsman certificate (Kfz-Mechatroniker-Meister), and the founder and longtime head of the Zakspeed racing team.

Zakowski was born in Allenstein, East Prussia (now Olsztyn in Poland). After the Second World War, his mother fled from East Prussia with 11-years-old Erich and his four siblings, initially to a refugee camp in Lübeck, and finally the family settled in Niederzissen. He graduated in Andernach as an apprentice auto mechanic, and eventually passed his master exam. He founded his own garage in Niederzissen, which was the location of the Zakspeed racing operation, starting in 1968. In 1968, still under the previous name "Zakowski Niederzissen Tuning", he started using a Ford Escort 1300 GT for automobile races on the nearby Nürburgring.

In the 1970s and 1980s, under the direction of Zakowski, Zakspeed established itself in various racing series, (especially in the Deutsche Rennsport Meisterschaft (DRM) and Sports car racing). Zakspeed entered the Formula 1 series in 1985. In 1990, after five years of racing, his F1 team had to give up, due to the loss of main sponsor West. Contemporaneous Zakowski senior retired active leadership of the team and handed it over to his son Peter Zakowski.

Zakowski died on 1 November 2023, aged 89, at his home in Balkhausen.

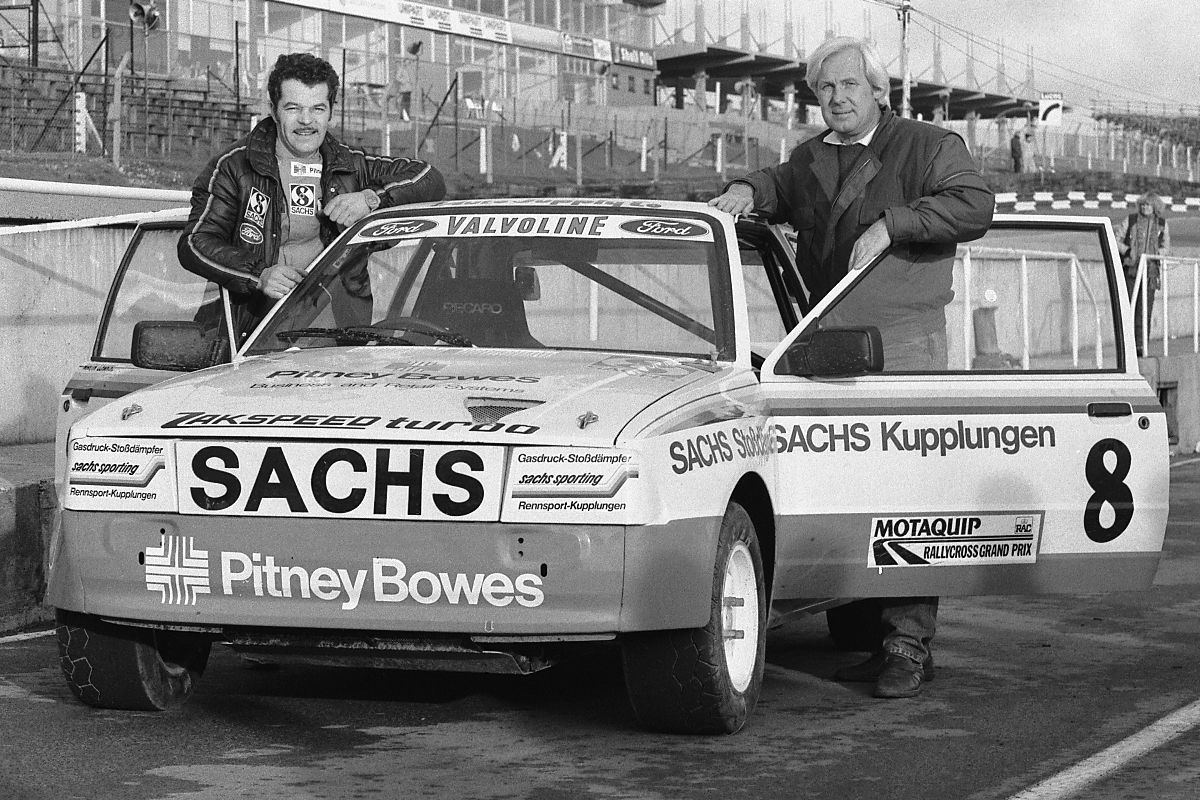
Erich Zakowski (right) and Martin Schanche at the British Rallycross GP 1983 in Brands Hatch

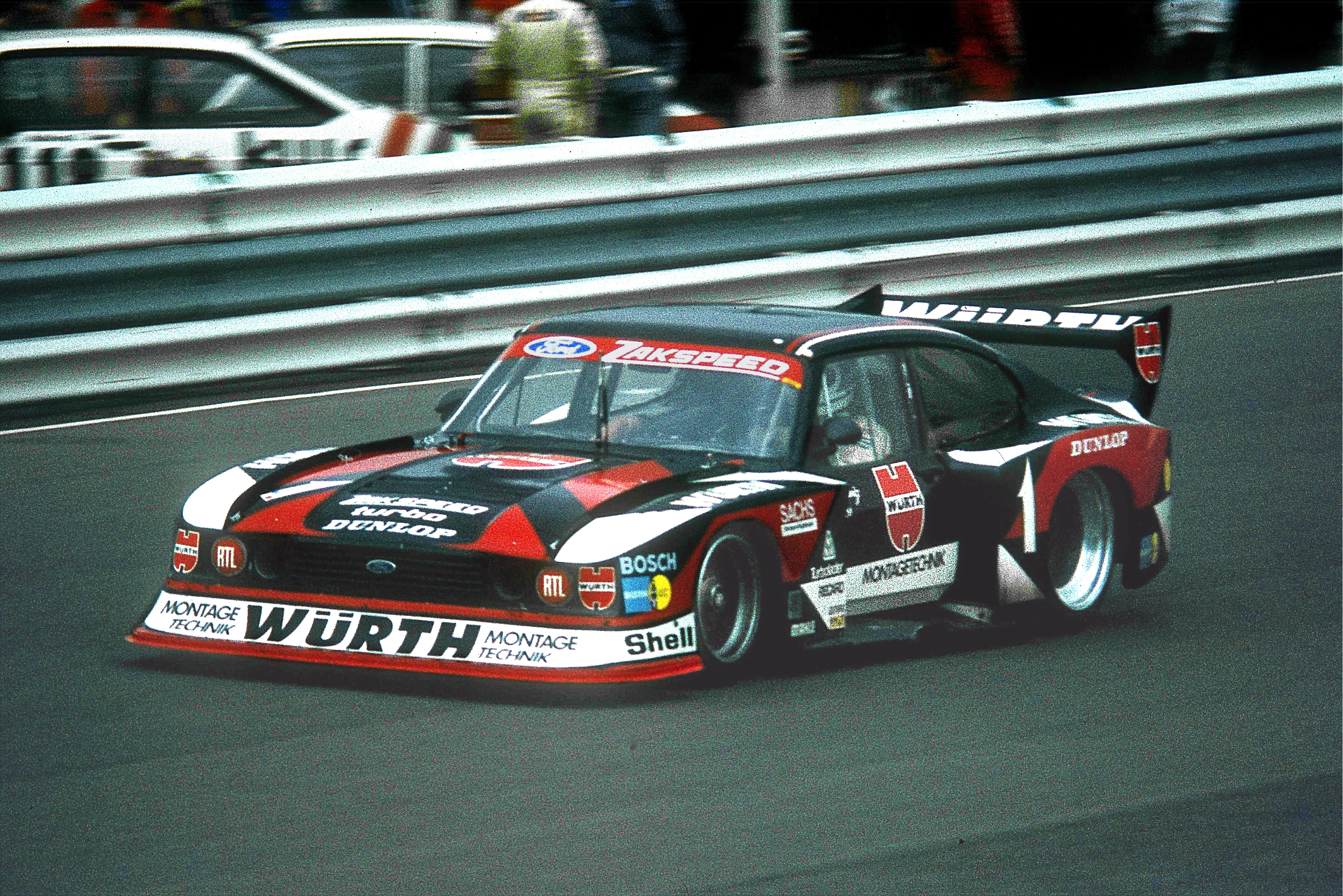
One of the used sports car under Zakowski (Ford Capri Turbo with Jochen Mass 1980)
