= Zakspeed 871 =

Formula One car

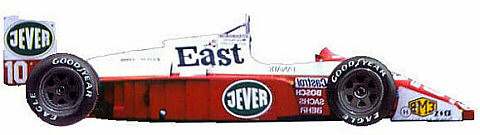
- The 871 of Christian Danner
- Category: Formula One
- Constructor: Zakspeed
- Designers: Chris Murphy; Heinz Zollner
- Predecessor: 861
- Successor: 881

Technical specifications
- Chassis: Carbon fibre Monocoque
- Suspension (front): Double wishbones, pullrods
- Suspension (rear): Double wishbones, pullrods
- Axle track: Front: 1,800 mm (71 in); Rear: 1,670 mm (66 in)
- Wheelbase: 2,800 mm (110 in)
- Engine: Zakspeed 1500/4 1,495 cc (91.2 cu in), Straight 4, turbo (4.0 Bar limited), mid-engine, longitudinally mounted
- Transmission: Hewland / Zakspeed 6-speed manual
- Weight: 560 kg (1,230 lb)
- Fuel: Wintershall / Castrol
- Tyres: Goodyear

Competition history
- Notable entrants: West Zakspeed Racing
- Notable drivers: 9. (United Kingdom) Martin Brundle; 10. (Germany) Christian Danner
- Debut: 1987 San Marino Grand Prix
- Last event: 1987 Australian Grand Prix
Races	Wins	Poles	F/Laps
15	0	0	0
- Constructors' Championships: 0
- Drivers' Championships: 0

The Zakspeed 871 was a Formula One car designed by Chris Murphy and Heinz Zollner and raced by Zakspeed in the 1987 Formula One season.

== Background ==
=== Engine ===
The car was powered by the team's own 1.5 litre, 1500/4 straight 4 turbo engine, which was rated at about 820 bhp (611 kW; 831 PS) for the season.

=== Sponsorship ===
The team's main sponsor was German tobacco company West.

=== Drivers ===
Martin Brundle had moved after 3 years at Tyrrell to be Zakspeed's lead driver, in a virtual driver swap with Jonathan Palmer, who had left Zakspeed after two seasons to drive for Tyrrell. Brundle was joined by former Formula 3000 champion Christian Danner, who had moved from Arrows.

== Racing history ==
After using the 861 for the first race in Brazil, the 871 made its debut in Brundle's hands at the San Marino Grand Prix where he qualified 15th and scored 2 points for finishing 5th. This happened to be the only time that Zakspeed would ever score a point during their time in Formula One.

The 871 was replaced for the 1988 season by the team's last turbo car, the Zakspeed 881 which would be again powered by the team's own turbocharged engine.

== Complete Formula One results ==
(key)

Year	Team	Engine	Tyres	Drivers	1	2	3	4	5	6	7	8	9	10	11	12	13	14	15	16	Points	WCC
1987	West Zakspeed Racing	Zakspeed 1500/4; S4 tc	G		BRA	SMR	BEL	MON	DET	FRA	GBR	GER	HUN	AUT	ITA	POR	ESP	MEX	JPN	AUS	2	10th
1987	West Zakspeed Racing	Zakspeed 1500/4; S4 tc	G	Martin Brundle		5	Ret	7		Ret	NC	NC	Ret	DSQ	Ret	Ret	11	Ret	Ret	Ret	2	10th
1987	West Zakspeed Racing	Zakspeed 1500/4; S4 tc	G	Christian Danner			Ret	EX	8	Ret	Ret	Ret	Ret	9	9	Ret	Ret	Ret	Ret	7	2	10th
