= Christian Danner =

German racing driver (born 1958)

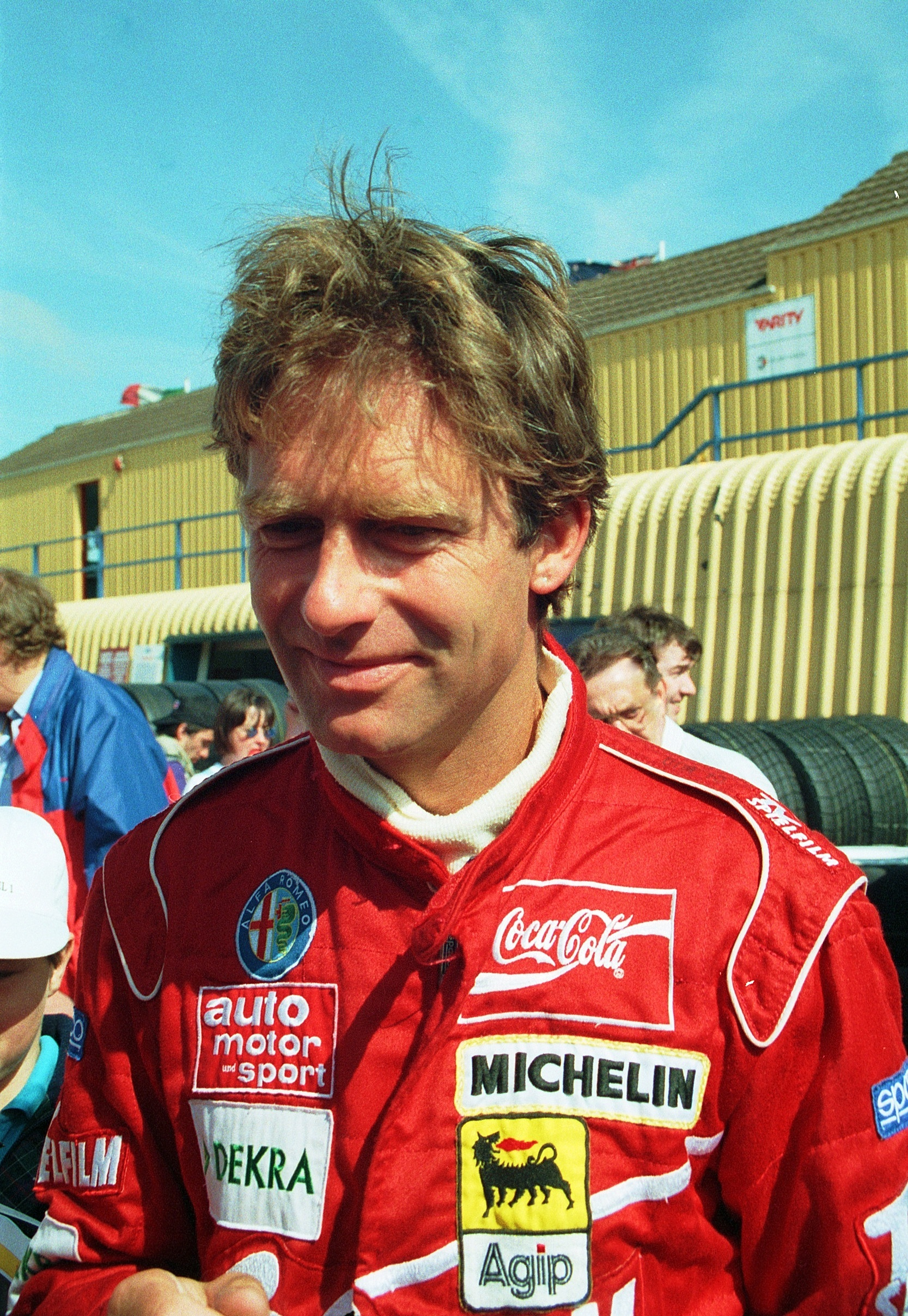
- Born: Christian Josef Danner; 4 April 1958 (age 68); Munich, West Germany

Formula One World Championship career
- Nationality: (Germany) German
- Active years: 1985–1987, 1989
- Team(s): Zakspeed, Osella, Arrows, Rial
- Entries: 47 (36 starts)
- Championships: 0
- Wins: 0
- Podiums: 0
- Career points: 4
- Pole positions: 0
- Fastest laps: 0
- First entry: 1985 Belgian Grand Prix
- Last entry: 1989 Portuguese Grand Prix

Christian Josef Danner (born 4 April 1958) is a former racing driver from Germany.

== Career ==
=== Formula Two and Formula 3000 ===
The son of car safety expert Max Danner, Danner started his motor racing career immediately after leaving school in 1977. After having raced in the Renault 5 cup, Danner moved to the European Formula Two Championship for the 1981 season. During his years in Formula Two, Danner was a constant frontrunner. He scored several podiums but failed to win a race. Danner also set the F2 lap record of the current configuration of the old Nürburgring. Danner moved to the Formula 3000 championship in 1985 which replaced the Formula Two championship. With four wins, Danner became the inaugural Formula 3000 championship winner.

=== Formula One ===
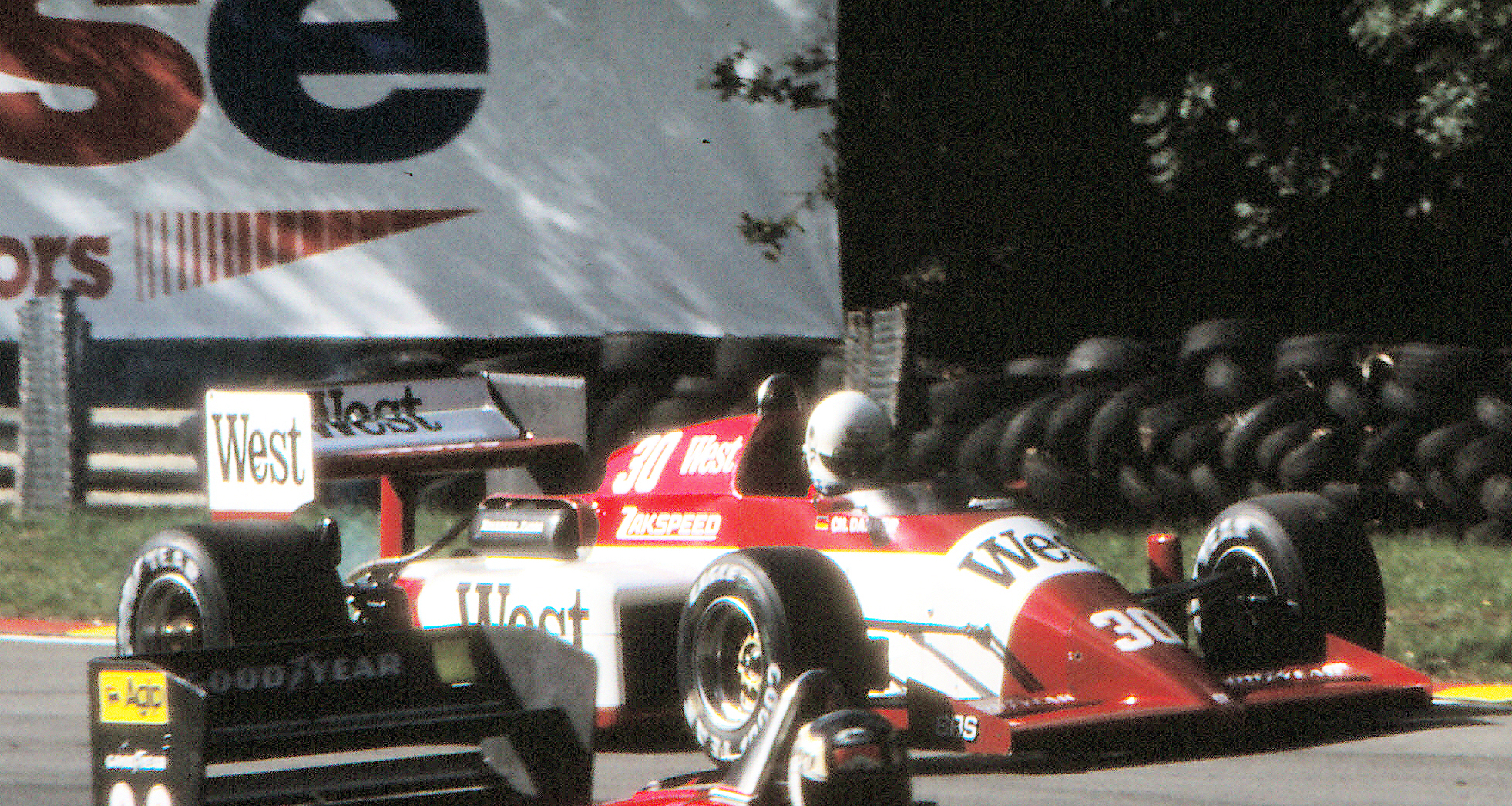
Danner at the 1985 European Grand Prix

In 1985, Danner made his Formula One debut with Zakspeed. He made two starts but failed to finish any races due to mechanical failures. For 1986, he signed with minor Italian outfit Osella but struggled to make an impression with the car and its under powered Alfa Romeo engine. After failing to finish a race in the first six races, Danner moved to Arrows with their powerful BMW turbo engines and scored his first point at the Austrian Grand Prix.

Danner returned to Zakspeed in 1987. The car was both un-competitive and often unreliable and when Danner finished a race it was always outside the points. After having raced touring cars in 1988, Danner returned to Formula one in 1989 with Rial Racing. The car was highly uncompetitive, and a fourth place due to a high attrition rate at the 1989 United States Grand Prix was the only highlight of the year. Danner was fired after the Portuguese Grand Prix after only qualifying for four races that year.

=== Touring cars ===
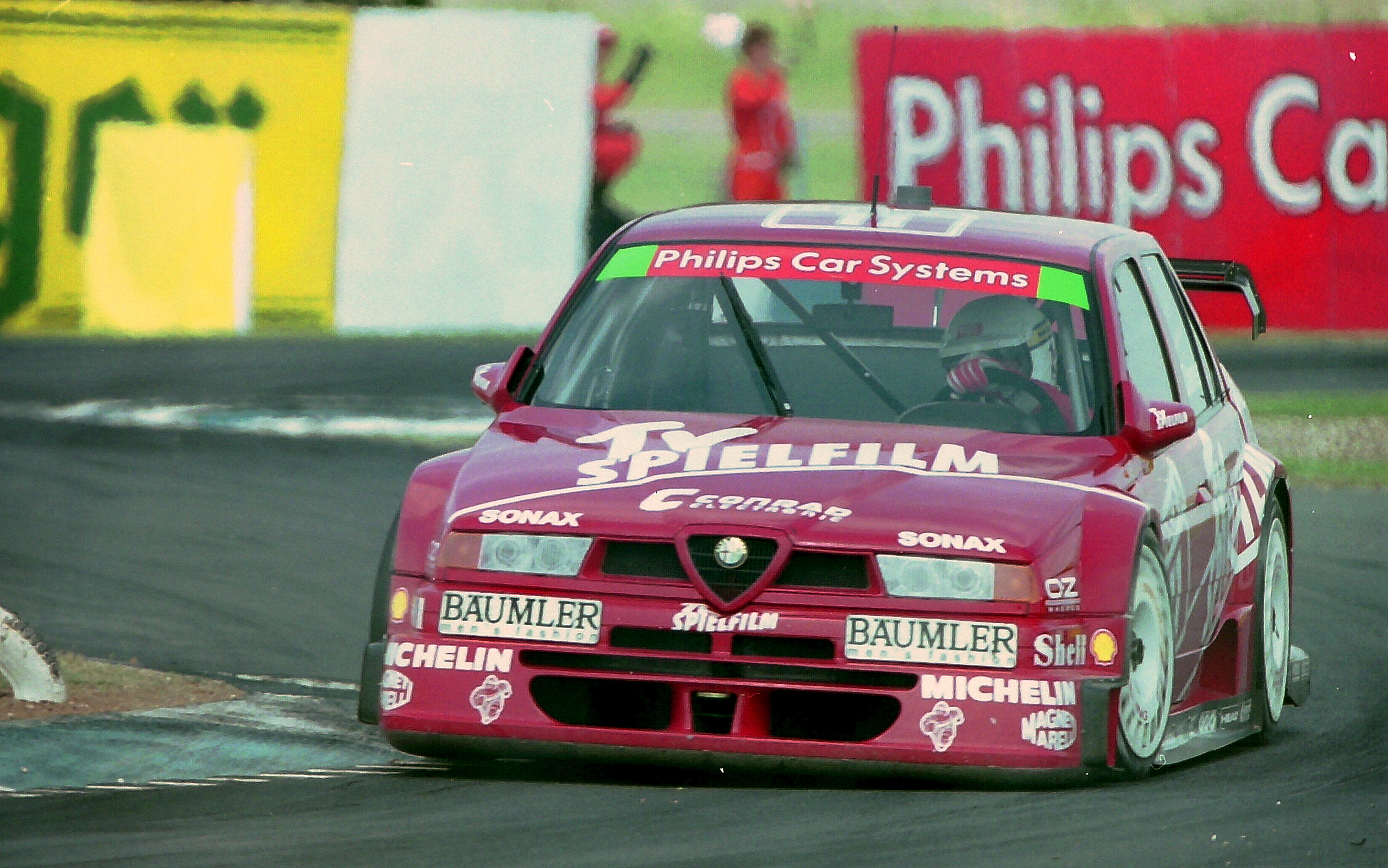
Christian Danner -Schubel Engineering - Alfa Romeo 155 V6 TI 94 exits The Esses, Donington 1994 DTM

After his Formula One career, Danner became a regular competitor in the Deutsche Tourenwagen Meisterschaft. He made his debut in 1988 after failing to find a ride in Formula one. Danner made an impressive start to his touring car career as he won both races at the Hockenheimring driving a BMW M3. After only making sporadic appearances in 1989 and 1990, Danner made a full-time return to the series in 1991. He had a disappointing season and only had one points scoring finish. In 1993, Danner had his best season. He scored six podium finishes and finished fifth in the points standings. He also won a race at the Non-Championship round in Donington Park. Danner returned to winning ways in 1995 when he won a race at the Norisring. Danner kept racing touring cars through 1997.

In 1991, Danner also started in one British Touring Car Championship race at Thruxton, driving a BMW M3.

=== Other racing ===
Danner competed in Japanese Formula 3000 in 1990, driving for Leyton House's F3000 team. He scored four points and was ranked 14th. In the nineties Danner made several appearances in the Indy Car World Series. His best finish was a seventh place at Homestead Miami in 1995. He also took part in the now defunct series, Grand Prix Masters.

=== Media career ===
After his racing career, Danner became an F1 commentator for the channel RTL in his native Germany. He appears in the Pixar Cars franchise as Chris Dinner in German dubs, taking the voice roles of Darrell Waltrip in the English language versions.

== Motorsports career results ==
=== Career summary ===
Season	Series	Team	Races	Wins	Poles	F/Laps	Podiums	Points	Position
1980	German Racing Championship	Cassani Racing	5	0	0	0	0	20	23rd
1981	European Formula Two	March Racing	12	0	0	0	0	2	18th
1981	24 Hours of Le Mans	Helmut Marko RSM	1	0	0	0	0	N/A	DNF
1982	European Formula Two	March Racing	13	0	0	1	0	6	14th
1983	European Formula Two	Onyx Racing	12	0	0	0	1	21	5th
1983	Formula Pacific	Andrew Miedecke	8	0	1	1	3	46	7th
1984	European Formula Two	BS Automotive	11	0	1	0	4	23	5th
1984	World Sportscar Championship	Richard Lloyd Racing	1	0	0	0	0	0	NC
1985	International Formula 3000	BS Automotive	11	4	2	4	7	51	**1st**
1985	Formula One	West Zakspeed Racing	2	0	0	0	0	0	NC
1985	24 Hours of Le Mans	Kreepy Krauly Racing	1	0	0	0	0	N/A	22nd
1985	European Touring Car Championship	Magnum Racing	3	0	0	0	0	0	NC
1986	Formula One	Osella Squadra Corse	6	0	0	0	0	1	18th
1986	Formula One	Barclay Arrows BMW	10	0	0	0	0	1	18th
1986	24 Hours of Le Mans	Kouros Sauber Racing Team	1	0	0	0	0	N/A	DNF
1987	Formula One	West Zakspeed Racing	15	0	0	0	0	0	NC
1987	European Touring Car Championship	Schnitzer Motorsport	1	0	0	0	0	0	NC
1988	Deutsche Tourenwagen Meisterschaft	Alpina	22	2	?	0	3	151	11th
1988	European Touring Car Championship	Prodrive	1	0	0	0	0	0	NC
1989	Formula One	Rial Racing	13	0	0	0	0	3	21st
1989	Deutsche Tourenwagen Meisterschaft	Linder Rennsport	6	0	?	0	0	46	21st
1990	Japanese Formula 3000	Leyton House Racing	9	0	0	0	1	4	15th
1990	Deutsche Tourenwagen Meisterschaft	Schnitzer Rennsport	3	0	?	0	0	0	NC
1991	Deutsche Tourenwagen Meisterschaft	MM-Diebels	15	0	?	0	0	6	21st
1991	British Touring Car Championship	Prodrive	1	0	0	0	0	8	18th
1992	PPG Indycar Series	Euromotorsport	9	0	0	0	0	0	39th
1993	PPG Indycar Series	Euromotorsport	3	0	0	0	0	2	31st
1993	Deutsche Tourenwagen Meisterschaft	Schübel Engineering	22	0	?	2	6	161	5th
1993	FIA Touring Car Challenge	Schübel Engineering	2	0	0	0	0	10	18th
1994	PPG Indycar Series	Project Indy	3	0	0	0	0	2	30th
1994	Deutsche Tourenwagen Meisterschaft	Schübel Engineering	24	0	0	0	3	88	9th
1995	PPG Indycar Series	Project Indy	2	0	0	0	0	6	25th
1995	Deutsche Tourenwagen Meisterschaft	Schübel Engineering	14	1	0	1	1	48	9th
1995	International Touring Car Championship	Schübel Engineering	10	1	1	0	1	22	13th
1996	International Touring Car Championship	TV Spielfilm Alfa Corse	26	0	2	0	2	48	15th
1997	Super Tourenwagen Cup	JAS Engineering	20	0	0	0	0	37	29th
1997	PPG Indycar Series	Dale Coyne Racing	3	0	0	0	0	1	31st
2001	Formula One	Jaguar Racing	Test driver						
2002	V8Star Series	JAG Racing Team	1	0	0	0	0	27	25th
2004	Mini Challenge Deutschland	O2 can Race Team	1	1	0	0	1	30	24th
2005	Grand Prix Masters	Team Unipart	1	0	0	0	0	N/A	7th
2005	Italian Formula 3000 Championship	Durango	1	0	0	0	0	1	23rd
2006	Grand Prix Masters	Team LUK	2	0	2	0	0	10	**2nd**
2006	Mini Challenge Deutschland	Team MINI Deutschland	2	0	2	0	0	0	NC
2007	Formula One	Super Aguri	Test driver						
2007	Mini Challenge Deutschland	Team MINI Deutschland	2	0	1	0	0	29	27th
2008	Speedcar Series	Phoenix Racing	2	0	0	0	0	0	20th
2017	GT4 European Series Northern Cup	MOMO-Megatron Team Partrax	2	0	0	0	0	0	NC
2017	GT4 European Series Southern Cup	MOMO-Megatron Team Partrax	2	0	0	0	0	0	NC
2018	GT4 Central European Cup - Am	Team GT	2	1	0	2	2	43	8th
2018	French GT4 Cup - Am	Team GT	2	0	0	0	0	0	NC
2019	GT4 European Series - Am	Team GT	2	1	0	0	2	43	7th
2019	ADAC GT4 Germany	Team GT	4	0	0	0	0	0	NC

=== Complete European Formula Two Championship results ===
(key) (Races in bold indicate pole position; races in italics indicate fastest lap)

Year	Entrant	Chassis	Engine	1	2	3	4	5	6	7	8	9	10	11	12	13	Pos.	Pts
1980	Cassani Racing Team	Ralt RT1	BMW	THR	HOC	NÜR; DNS	VLL	PAU	SIL	ZOL	MUG	ZAN	PER	MIS	HOC		NC	0
1981	March Racing	March 812	BMW	SIL; 10	HOC; 9	THR; 5	NÜR; 10	VLL; Ret	MUG; 16	PAU; Ret	PER; Ret	SPA; Ret	DON; 14	MIS; Ret	MAN; 11		18th	2
1982	March Racing	March 822	BMW	SIL; Ret	HOC; Ret	THR; Ret	NÜR; 9	MUG; DNS	VLL; 13	PAU; Ret	SPA; 9	HOC; Ret	DON; 7	MAN; 6	PER; 5	MIS; 4	14th	6
1983	Onyx Racing	March 832	BMW	SIL; 3	THR; 13	HOC; 2	**NÜR**; 3	VLL; 10	PAU; 5	JAR; 9	DON; 5	MIS; Ret	PER; 7	ZOL; 4	MUG; 10		5th	21
1984	BS Automotive	March 842	BMW	SIL; 7	HOC; 6	THR; 2	VLL; 3	**MUG**; 3	PAU; 4	HOC; Ret	MIS; 6	PER; Ret	DON; 3	BRH; 10			5th	23

=== Complete 24 Hours of Le Mans results ===
Year	Team	Co-Drivers	Car	Class	Laps	Pos.	Class Pos.
1981	(Austria) Helmut Marko RSM	(West Germany) Peter Oberndofer (West Germany) Prince Leopold von Bayern	BMW M1	GT	49	DNF	DNF
1985	(South Africa) Kreepy Krauly Racing	(South Africa) Graham Duxbury (Italy) Almo Coppelli	March 85G-Porsche	C1	270	22nd	17th
1986	(Switzerland) Kouros Sauber Racing Team	(France) Henri Pescarolo (Austria) Dieter Quester	Sauber C8-Mercedes	C1	86	DNF	DNF

=== Complete International Formula 3000 results ===
(key) (Races in bold indicate pole position; races in italics indicate fastest lap.)

Year	Entrant	Chassis	Engine	1	2	3	4	5	6	7	8	9	10	11	12	Pos.	Pts
1985	BS Automotive	March 85B	Cosworth	SIL; 4	THR; 6	EST; 9	NÜR; C	VLL; 3	PAU; 1	SPA; 3	DIJ; 1	PER; 3	**ÖST**; 16	**ZAN**; 1	DON; 1	**1st**	**51**

=== Complete Formula One World Championship results ===
(key) (Races in bold indicate pole position) (Races in italics indicate fastest lap)

Year	Team	Chassis	Engine	1	2	3	4	5	6	7	8	9	10	11	12	13	14	15	16	WDC	Pts
1985	West Zakspeed Racing	Zakspeed 841	Zakspeed 1500/4 1.5 L4t	BRA	POR	SMR	MON	CAN	DET	FRA	GBR	GER	AUT	NED	ITA	BEL; Ret	EUR; Ret	RSA	AUS	NC	0
1986	Osella Squadra Corse	Osella FA1G	Alfa Romeo 890T 1.5 V8t	BRA; Ret	ESP; Ret	SMR; Ret	MON; DNQ		CAN; Ret											18th	1
1986	Osella Squadra Corse	Osella FA1H	Alfa Romeo 890T 1.5 V8t					BEL; Ret												18th	1
1986	Barclay Arrows BMW	Arrows A8	BMW M12/13 1.5 L4t							DET; Ret	FRA; 11	GBR; Ret	GER; Ret		AUT; 6	ITA; 8	POR; 11	MEX; 9	AUS; Ret	18th	1
1986	Barclay Arrows BMW	Arrows A9	BMW M12/13 1.5 L4t											HUN; Ret						18th	1
1987	West Zakspeed Racing	Zakspeed 861	Zakspeed 1500/4 1.5 L4t	BRA; 9	SMR; 7															NC	0
1987	West Zakspeed Racing	Zakspeed 871	Zakspeed 1500/4 1.5 L4t			BEL; Ret	MON; EX	DET; 8	FRA; Ret	GBR; Ret	GER; Ret	HUN; Ret	AUT; 9	ITA; 9	POR; Ret	ESP; Ret	MEX; Ret	JPN; Ret	AUS; 7	NC	0
1989	Rial Racing	Rial ARC2	Ford Cosworth DFR 3.5 V8	BRA; 14†	SMR; DNQ	MON; DNQ	MEX; 12	USA; 4	CAN; 8	FRA; DNQ	GBR; DNQ	GER; DNQ	HUN; DNQ	BEL; DNQ	ITA; DNQ	POR; DNQ	ESP	JPN	AUS	21st	3

=== Complete Japanese Formula 3000 Championship results ===
(key) (Races in bold indicate pole position) (Races in italics indicate fastest lap)

Year	Entrant	1	2	3	4	5	6	7	8	9	10	DC	Points
1990	Leyton House Racing	SUZ; 13	FUJ; Ret	MIN; 9	SUZ; 15	SUG; 17	FUJ; Ret	FUJ; 10	SUZ; 16	FUJ; 3	SUZ	15th	4

=== Complete Deutsche Tourenwagen Meisterschaft results ===
(key) (Races in bold indicate pole position) (Races in italics indicate fastest lap)

Year	Team	Car	1	2	3	4	5	6	7	8	9	10	11	12	13	14	15	16	17	18	19	20	21	22	23	24	Pos.	Pts
1988	Alpina	BMW M3	ZOL; 1; 26	ZOL; 2; 8	HOC; 1; 1	HOC; 2; 1	NÜR; 1 Ret	NÜR; 2; 14	BRN; 1; 34	BRN; 2 Ret	AVU; 1; 11	AVU; 2 Ret	MFA; 1; 4	MFA; 2; 6	NÜR; 1; 9	NÜR; 2; 3	NOR; 1; 24	NOR; 2 Ret	WUN; 1; 24	WUN; 2; 26	SAL; 1 C	SAL; 2 C	HUN; 1; 11	HUN; 2; 13	HOC; 1; 12	HOC; 2; 7	11th	151
1989	Linder Rennsport	BMW M3	ZOL; 1; 17	ZOL; 2; 4	HOC; 1	HOC; 2	NÜR; 1	NÜR; 2	MFA; 1	MFA; 2	AVU; 1	AVU; 2	NÜR; 1	NÜR; 2	NOR; 1; 22	NOR; 2; 8	HOC; 1	HOC; 2	DIE; 1	DIE; 2	NÜR; 1	NÜR; 2	HOC; 1; 13	HOC; 2; 7			21st	46
1990	Schnitzer Motorsport	BMW M3	ZOL; 1	ZOL; 2	HOC; 1	HOC; 2	NÜR; 1	NÜR; 2	AVU; 1	AVU; 2	MFA; 1	MFA; 2	WUN; 1	WUN; 2	NÜR; 1	NÜR; 2	NOR; 1 Ret	NOR; 2	DIE; 1	DIE; 2	NÜR; 1	NÜR; 2	HOC; 1; 18	HOC; 2; 14			NC	0
1991	MM-Diebels	BMW M3	ZOL; 1; 23	ZOL; 2; 6	HOC; 1; 18	HOC; 2; 14	NÜR; 1; 16	NÜR; 2; 12	AVU; 1 Ret	AVU; 2 DNS	WUN; 1; 22	WUN; 2 Ret	NOR; 1	NOR; 2	DIE; 1 DNS	DIE; 2 DNS	NÜR; 1 Ret	NÜR; 2; 12	ALE; 1; 14	ALE; 2 Ret	HOC; 1; 29	HOC; 2; 19	BRN; 1	BRN; 2	DON; 1	DON; 2	21st	6
1993	Schübel Engineering	Alfa Romeo 155 V6 Ti	ZOL; 1; 2	ZOL; 2; 2	HOC; 1; 8	HOC; 2; 6	NÜR; 1; 6	NÜR; 2 Ret	WUN; 1; 4	WUN; 2; 5	NÜR; 1; 6	NÜR; 2; 2	NOR; 1; 3	NOR; 2; 3	**DON**; **1**; 1	**DON**; **2**; 2	DIE; 1; 7	DIE; 2 Ret	ALE; 1; 6	ALE; 2; 4	AVU; 1; 4	AVU; 2; 2	HOC; 1 Ret	HOC; 2; 5			5th	161
1994	Schübel Engineering	Alfa Romeo 155 V6 Ti	ZOL; 1; 10	ZOL; 2; 9	HOC; 1; 6	HOC; 2; 5	NÜR; 1; 2	NÜR; 2; 2	MUG; 1; 3	MUG; 2 Ret	NÜR; 1; 4	NÜR; 2; 8	NOR; 1 Ret	NOR; 2; 11	DON; 1; 9	DON; 2 DSQ	DIE; 1; 7	DIE; 2; 5	NÜR; 1 Ret	NÜR; 2 DNS	AVU; 1; 10	AVU; 2; 18	ALE; 1; 5	ALE; 2 Ret	HOC; 1; 10	HOC; 2; 6	9th	88
1995	Schübel Engineering	Alfa Romeo 155 V6 Ti	HOC; 1; 16	HOC; 2; 9	AVU; 1; 8	AVU; 2; 3	NOR; 1; 1	**NOR**; **2**; 6	DIE; 1; 8	DIE; 2 Ret	NÜR; 1; 12	NÜR; 2; 14	ALE; 1; 7	ALE; 2; 4	HOC; 1; 15	HOC; 2; 16											9th	48

=== Complete British Touring Car Championship results ===
(key) (Races in bold indicate pole position) (Races in italics indicate fastest lap)

Year	Team	Car	1	2	3	4	5	6	7	8	9	10	11	12	13	14	15	DC	Pts
1991	BMW Team Finance	BMW M3	SIL	SNE	DON	THR; 5	SIL	BRH	SIL	DON; 1	DON; 2	OUL	BRH; 1	BRH; 2	DON	THR	SIL	18th	8

=== Complete International Touring Car Championship results ===
(key) (Races in bold indicate pole position) (Races in italics indicate fastest lap)

Year	Team	Car	1	2	3	4	5	6	7	8	9	10	11	12	13	14	15	16	17	18	19	20	21	22	23	24	25	26	Pos.	Pts
1995	Schübel Engineering	Alfa Romeo 155 V6 Ti	MUG; 1 Ret	MUG; 2; 12	HEL; 1; 1	**HEL**; **2**; 13†	DON; 1; 12	DON; 2; 9	EST; 1; 15	EST; 2 DNS	MAG; 1 Ret	MAG; 2; 13																	13th	22
1996	TV Spielfilm Alfa Corse	Alfa Romeo 155 V6 Ti	HOC; 1; 13	HOC; 2 Ret	NÜR; 1; 9	NÜR; 2; 10	EST; 1; 12	EST; 2; 13	HEL; 1; 8	HEL; 2 Ret	NOR; 1 Ret	NOR; 2 DNS	DIE; 1; 15	DIE; 2 Ret	SIL; 1; 10	SIL; 2; 13	NÜR; 1; 18	NÜR; 2; 20	MAG; 1 Ret	MAG; 2 DNS	MUG; 1; 12	MUG; 2 Ret	HOC; 1; 7	HOC; 2; 6	**INT**; **1**; 3	INT; 2 Ret	**SUZ**; **1**; 2	SUZ; 2; 7	15th	48

=== Complete Super Tourenwagen Cup results ===
(key) (Races in bold indicate pole position) (Races in italics indicate fastest lap)

Year	Team	Car	1	2	3	4	5	6	7	8	9	10	11	12	13	14	15	16	17	18	19	20	Pos.	Pts
1997	JAS Engineering	Alfa Romeo 155 TS	HOC; 1; 17	HOC; 2; 23	ZOL; 1; 23	ZOL; 2; 23	NÜR; 1; 17	NÜR; 2 Ret	SAC; 1 Ret	SAC; 2 Ret	NOR; 1; 17	NOR; 2 Ret	WUN; 1; 18	WUN; 2 Ret	ZWE; 1; 24	ZWE; 2; 21	SAL; 1; 20	SAL; 2; 18	REG; 1; 20	REG; 2; 18	NÜR; 1; 23	NÜR; 2; 18	29th	37

=== American Open-Wheel racing results ===
==== PPG Indycar Series ====
(key) (Races in bold indicate pole position)

Year	Team	No.	1	2	3	4	5	6	7	8	9	10	11	12	13	14	15	16	17	Rank	Points	Ref
1992	Euromotorsport	50	SRF	PHX	LBH	INDY	DET; 18	POR	MIL	NHA	TOR; 16	MCH	CLE; 16	ROA; 16	VAN; 21	MDO; 19	NAZ; 13	LAG; 20		**39th**	**0**	
1993	Euromotorsport	50	SRF	PHX	LBH	INDY	MIL	DET	POR	CLE; 25	TOR	MCH	NHA	ROA; 11	VAN	MDO	NAZ	LAG; 26		**31st**	**2**	
1994	Project Indy	64	SRF	PHX	LBH	INDY	MIL	DET; 12	POR	CLE	TOR	MCH	MDO	NHA	VAN	ROA; 12	NAZ	LAG		**30th**	**2**	
1995	Project Indy	64	MIA; 7	SRF	PHX	LBH	NAZ	INDY	MIL	DET; 22	POR	ROA	TOR	CLE	MCH	MDO	NHA	VAN	LAG	**25th**	**6**	
1997	Payton/Coyne	34	MIA	SRF	LBH	NAZ	RIO	GAT	MIL	DET; 12	POR; 27	CLE	TOR	MCH	MDO	ROA	VAN; 23	LAG	FON	**31st**	**1**	

=== Complete Grand Prix Masters results ===
(key) Races in bold indicate pole position, races in italics indicate fastest lap.

Year	Team	Chassis	Engine	1	2	3	4	5
2005	Team Unipart	Delta Motorsport GPM	Nicholson McLaren 3.5 V8	RSA; 7				
2006	Team LUK	Delta Motorsport GPM	Nicholson McLaren 3.5 V8	QAT; 2	ITA; C	**GBR**; 3	MAL; C	RSA; C

Sporting positions
Preceded by Mike Thackwell (Formula 2)	International Formula 3000 Champion; 1985	Succeeded by Ivan Capelli
