= Zakspeed =

Auto racing team

(Germany) Zakspeed
- Founded: 1968
- Founder(s): Erich Zakowski
- Base: Niederzissen
- Team principal(s): Peter Zakowski
- Former series: Formula One; Superleague Formula; V8Star Series; German Formula Three Championship; ADAC GT Masters
- Teams' Championships: V8Star Series: 2002; 2003; Superleague Formula: 2008
- Drivers' Championships: Deutsche Rennsport Meisterschaft: 1972: Hans-Joachim Stuck; 1973: Dieter Glemser; 1974: Dieter Glemser; 1975: Hans Heyer; 1976: Hans Heyer; 1981: Klaus Ludwig; Interserie: 1984: Klaus Niedzwiedz; Deutsche Tourenwagen Meisterschaft: 1987: Eric van de Poele; Nürburgring Langstrecken-Serie: 1999: Peter Zakowski, Hans-Jürgen Tiemann; V8Star Series: 2003: Pedro Lamy; Superleague Formula: 2008: Davide Rigon; ADAC GT Masters; 2015: Sebastian Asch, Luca Ludwig
- Website: http://www.zakspeed.de/

Zakspeed (German pronunciation: [ˈtsakspiːt]) is a motor racing team from Germany, founded in 1968 by Erich Zakowski and then run by his son Peter Zakowski. It is based in Niederzissen, Rhineland-Palatinate, around 25 kilometres (16 mi) from the Nürburgring circuit.

The team was, together with the Rial Racing, one of the two last German Formula One teams based in Germany (with the Zakspeed's base in Niederzissen).

== 1973 to 1981: Saloon and sports car racing ==
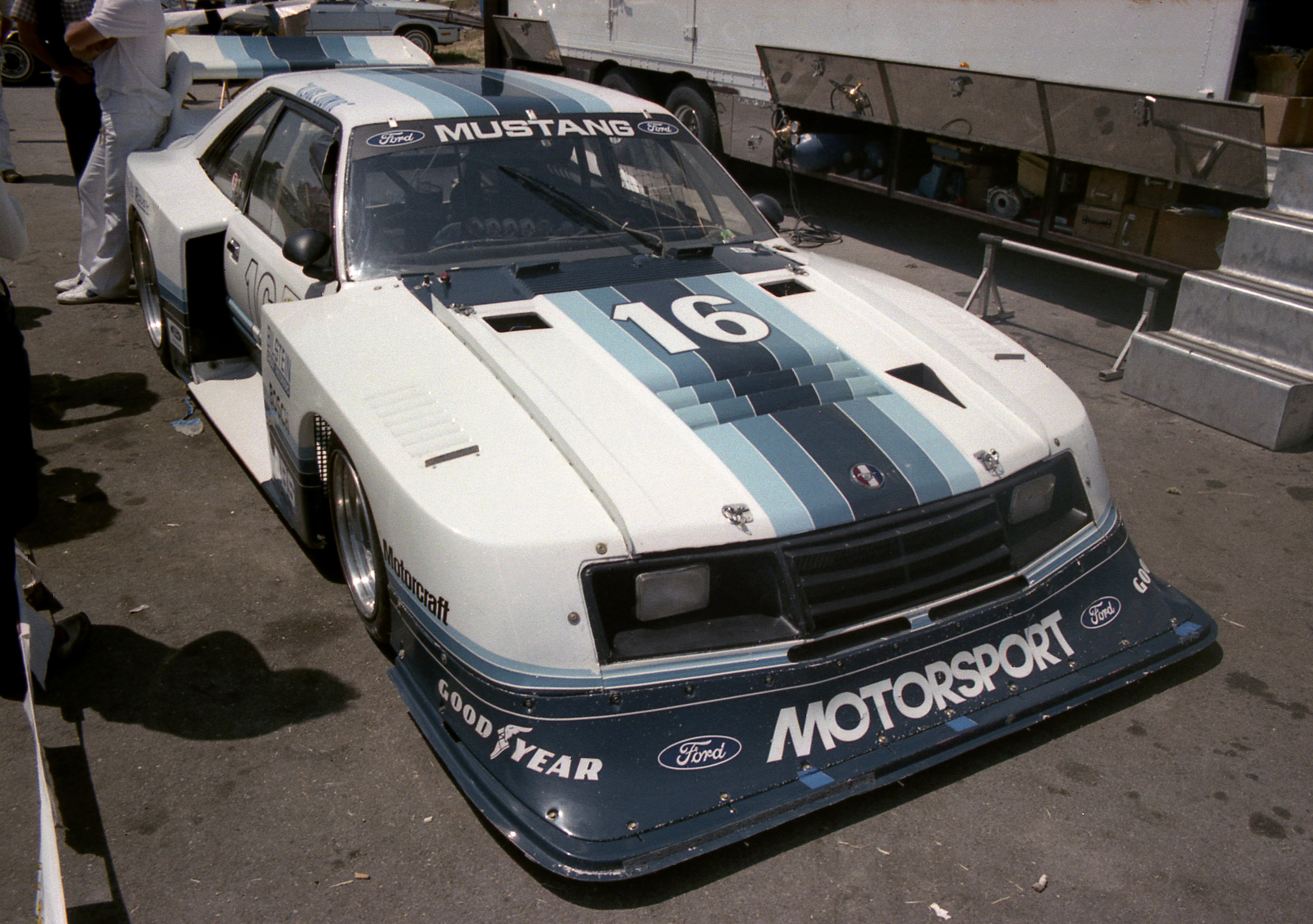
Klaus Ludwig drove the Roush-Zakspeed Ford Mustang Turbo during the 1981 and 1982 Camel GT race seasons.

Zakowski founded Zakspeed in 1973 with the ambition of competing in sports car racing. In the late 1970s, the team became the official Ford team in the German Deutsche Rennsport Meisterschaft (DRM) series, a predecessor of the current DTM. Zakspeed constructed and entered an FIA Group 2 Escort and the Group 5 Capri, based on the MKIII production model. During this period, the team achieved a number of victories including the overall championship in 1981 with driver Klaus Ludwig.

In the early 1980s, Zakspeed also prepared a Mustang for Ford USA's Special Vehicle Operations to race in the domestic IMSA Camel GT series. The Mustang chassis was based on the Group 5 Capri.

== 1982 to 1990: Endurance cars, F1 and BMW touring car racing ==
(Germany) Zakspeed
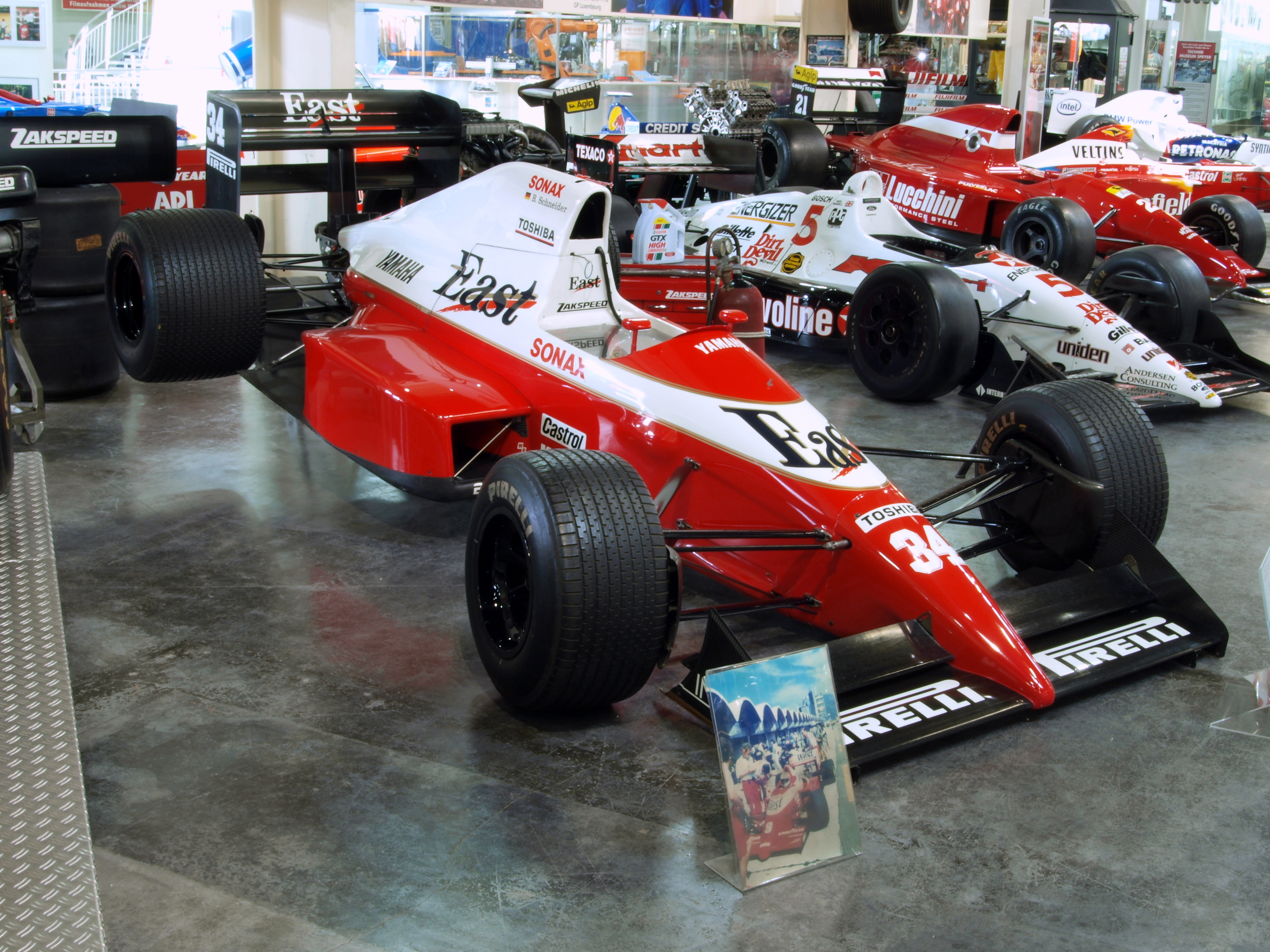
- Full name: Zakspeed Racing
- Base: Niederzissen, Germany
- Team principal(s): Jean-Luc Lagardère
- Founder(s): Erich Zakowski
- Noted staff: Paul Brown; Chris Murphy; Heinz Zollner; Gustav Brunner
- Noted drivers: (United Kingdom) Jonathan Palmer (Germany) Christian Danner (United Kingdom) Martin Brundle (Italy) Piercarlo Ghinzani (Germany) Bernd Schneider

Formula One World Championship career
- First entry: 1985 Portuguese Grand Prix
- Races entered: 74
- Constructors' Championships: 0 (best finish: 10th, 1987)
- Drivers' Championships: 0
- Race victories: 0 (best finish: 5th, 1987 San Marino Grand Prix)
- Podiums: 0
- Points: 2
- Pole positions: 0 (best grid position: 13th, 1987 Mexican Grand Prix)
- Fastest laps: 0
- Final entry: 1989 Australian Grand Prix

In 1982, Zakspeed ran the works Ford C100 Group C effort in conjunction with the factory. The Zakspeed-prepared machine was run by the works Ford Germany team with Klaus Ludwig, Manfred Winkelhock and Marc Surer at the wheel. The car was a midfielder at best, although Jonathan Palmer and Desiré Wilson scored a fourth place overall the 1000 km of Brands Hatch in 1982. Ford Germany retracted their support and one car was sold to privateers, while the other chassis was evolved by Zakspeed into the C1/4 and the C1/8, making few appearances in international racing, but becoming a front-runner in the German Interserie, where it won the championship in 1984 with Klaus Niedzwiedz.

The engine was the basis for their Formula One entry from 1985 to 1988. Zakspeed became notable for building their own chassis and engine, something only Ferrari, Alfa Romeo and Renault did at that time. After a maiden season with Jonathan Palmer, the team hired the first Formula 3000 champion Christian Danner and ex-Tyrrell driver Martin Brundle. The team's best result (and only points finish) was Brundle's fifth place in the 1987 San Marino Grand Prix.

For their final season in 1989, Zakspeed switched to Yamaha engines as turbos were banned. The Japanese engine was unreliable and drivers Bernd Schneider (former German Formula 3 champion), Piercarlo Ghinzani and the rookie Aguri Suzuki struggled to pre-qualify the car. Schneider only qualified the car twice and retired both times, while Suzuki never got past pre-qualifying. Despite announcements in late November about an exclusive engine supply deal with Yamaha for the 1990 season, the team retired from the sport at the end of the year.

In 1987 while still doing Formula 1, Zakspeed also returned to their touring car roots with a works programme with BMW using the M3 in both the DTM and the European Championship the latter while the two main BMW works teams Schnitzer and Bigazzi focused on the World Championship while also running the revived BMW Junior Team in the DTM, in 1988 after the World Championship was cancelled Schnitzer and Bigazzi returned to being BMW's works teams in the European Championship in its final season with Zakspeed running the works DTM BMWs along with Linder, in 1989 in the DTM they and Linder were joined by Schnitzer after the European Championship was axed at the end of 1988, and in 1990 for Zakspeed's final season as a BMW works team, Zakspeed focused on the DTM full time after quitting Formula 1 and Bigazzi joining the DTM full-time after focusing on the Italian series in 1989 after which Zakspeed would switch to Mercedes for 1991.

== 1990s and beyond: Return to sports and touring cars ==
After withdrawing from F1, Zakspeed focused again exclusively on sport cars. The team ran Mercedes 190E and Opel Calibra cars in the 1990s Deutsche Tourenwagen Meisterschaft and the short-lived ITC series and in 1997 ran Opel Vectras in the Super Tourenwagen Cup. Around this time, Peter Zakowski, who had raced in Formula 3 and endurance races (he had won the 24 Hours Nürburgring in 1997, 1999, 2001 and 2002) took over from his father.

In 1998, Zakspeed entered two Porsche 911 GT1 in the FIA GT Championship, where French Team Oreca dominated the GT2-class with their heavily modified Chrysler Viper GTS-Rs. One of these Vipers was purchased by Zakspeed to be entered on the Nürburgring VLN series to take advantage of the new, less restrictive rules for the 1999 season. Zakowski and his teammate dominated the 1999 season, winning every race, before the rules were altered for 2000 and the Porsche 996 GT3 showed up. The team won the 24 Hours Nürburgring again in 2001 and 2002. In 2003, against factory competition, they were disqualified due to a dispute over fuel tank size.

A company related to Zakspeed, Nitec, built the NASCAR-like V8-powered tube frame prototype cars of the V8Star Series Championship series which ran from 2001 to 2003. These identical cars used bodies modelled after road cars from Jaguar, BMW, Opel, Lexus and others. Zakspeed itself won in 2003 with Pedro Lamy in a Jaguar-bodied car.

In 2001, Zakspeed made a brief return to single-seaters with a foray into CART racing in the US in partnership with the long-established Forsythe Championship Racing.

In 2006, Zakspeed returned to the FIA GT Championship with the Saleen S7-R. The team also runs a racing school operating at the Nürburgring circuit.

== Superleague Formula ==
In 2008, Zakspeed managed the Superleague Formula cars of Borussia Dortmund and Beijing Guoan, with the latter taking the overall title from such clubs as PSV Eindhoven, Liverpool F.C. and A.C. Milan. Dortmund took one win in the season and Beijing took three on the way to the title with driver Davide Rigon.

In 2009, Zakspeed managed Sporting CP (who won a race with Pedro Petiz) and R.S.C. Anderlecht.

== Gallery ==
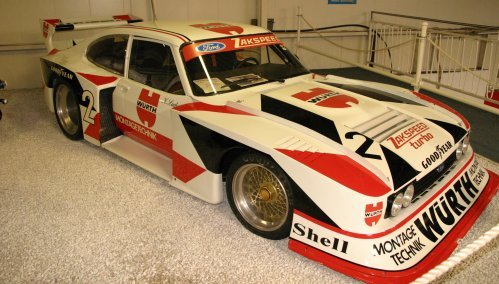
1981 Group 5 Zakspeed Ford Capri at the Auto & Technik Museum in Sinsheim, Germany

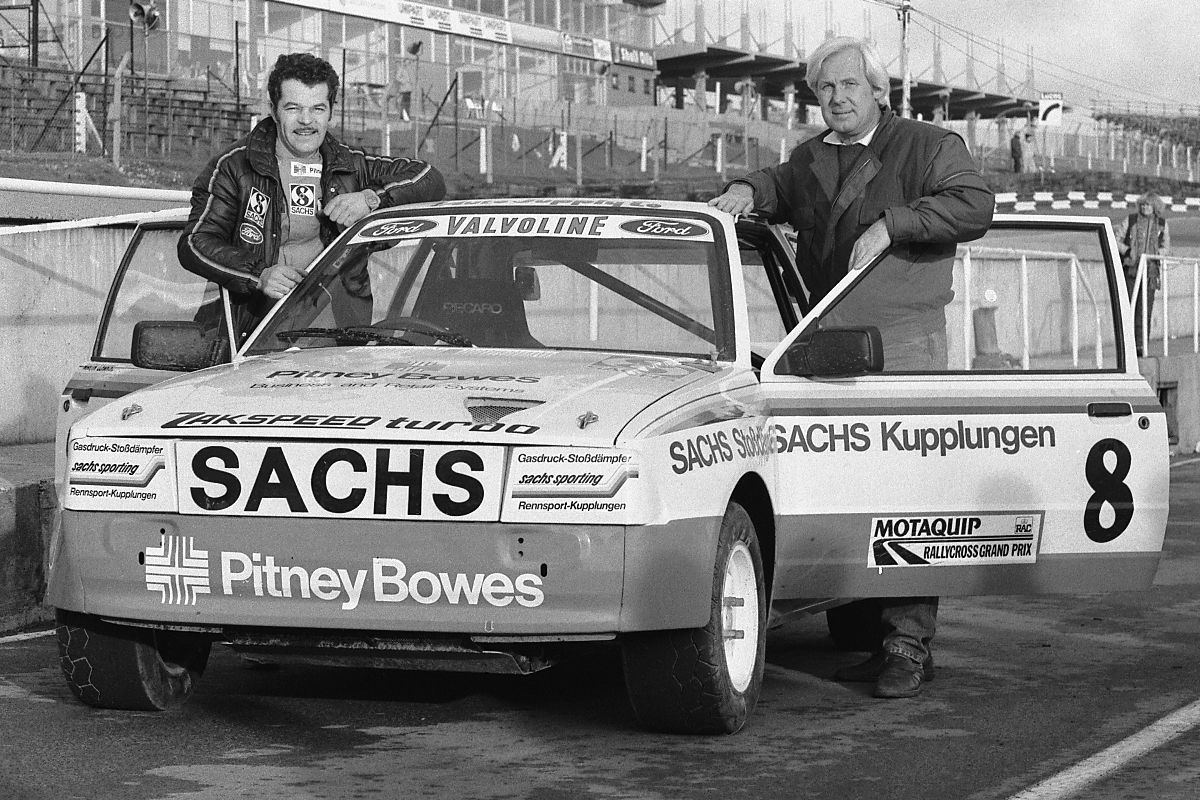
Company founder Erich Zakowski (right) and Martin Schanche pictured at the British Rallycross GP 1983 at Brands Hatch

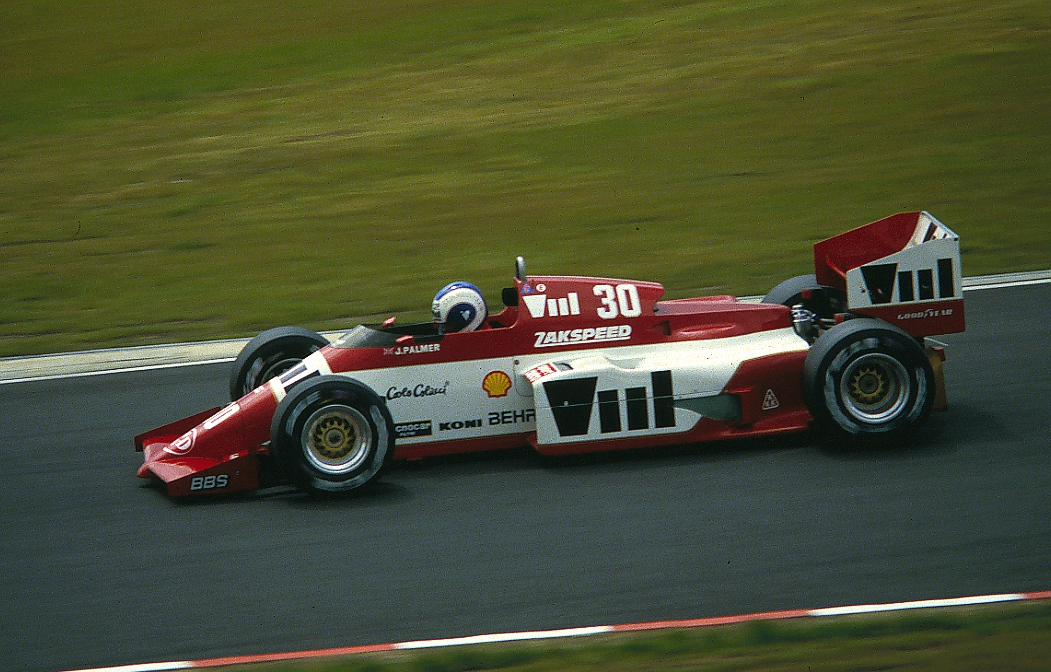
The Zakspeed 841 being driven by Jonathan Palmer at the 1985 German Grand Prix.

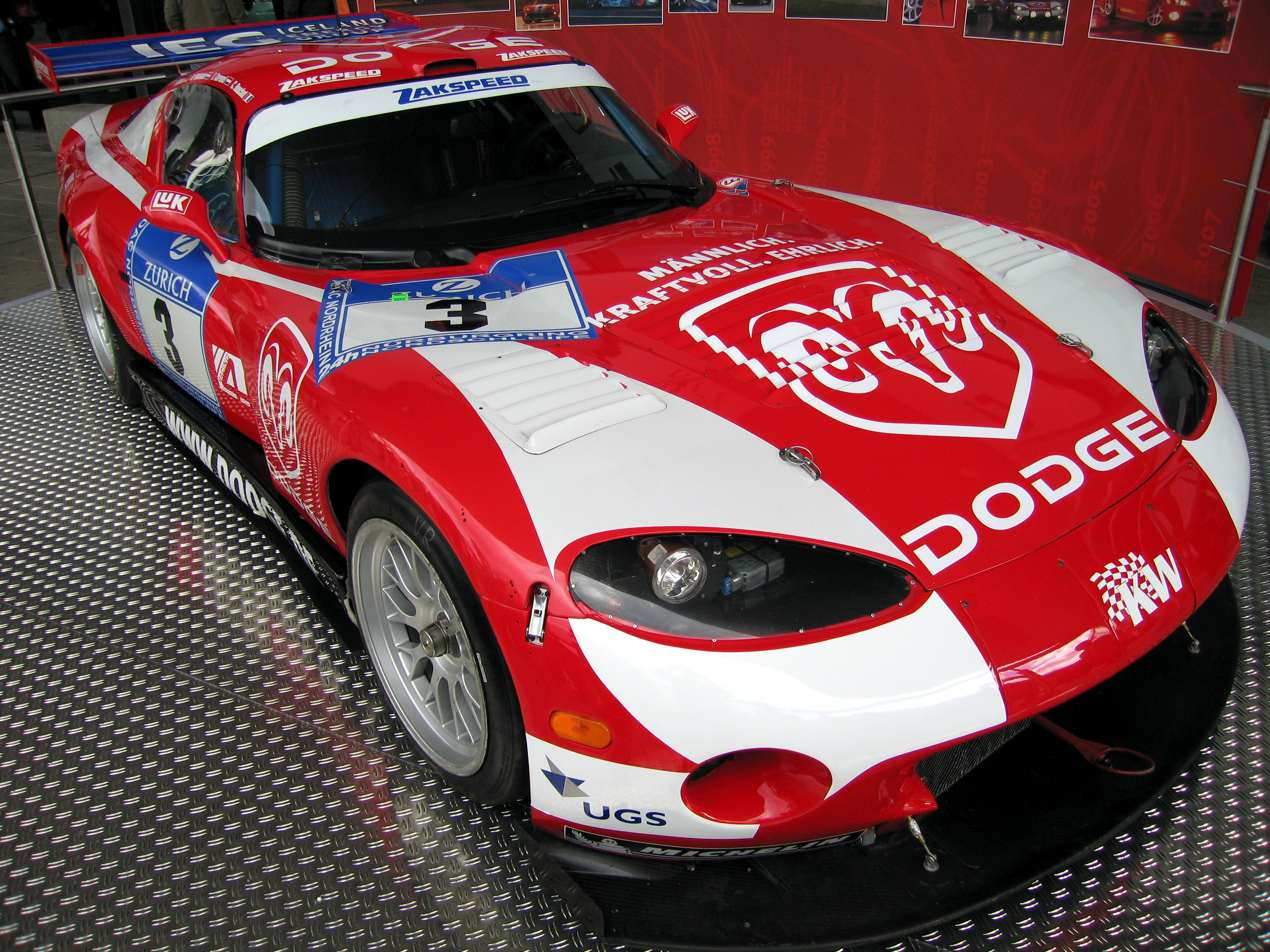
Zakspeed Dodge Viper GTS-R in the 24h, 2007

== Complete Formula One World Championship results ==
(key) (results in bold indicate pole position)

Year	Chassis	Engine	Tyres	Drivers	1	2	3	4	5	6	7	8	9	10	11	12	13	14	15	16	Points	WCC
1985	841	Zakspeed 1500/4 1.5 L4 t	G		BRA	POR	SMR	MON	CAN	DET	FRA	GBR	GER	AUT	NED	ITA	BEL	EUR	RSA	AUS	0	NC
1985	841	Zakspeed 1500/4 1.5 L4 t	G	(United Kingdom) Jonathan Palmer		Ret	DNS	11			Ret	Ret	Ret	Ret	Ret						0	NC
1985	841	Zakspeed 1500/4 1.5 L4 t	G	(West Germany) Christian Danner													Ret	Ret			0	NC
1986	861	Zakspeed 1500/4 1.5 L4 t	G		BRA	ESP	SMR	MON	BEL	CAN	DET	FRA	GBR	GER	HUN	AUT	ITA	POR	MEX	AUS	0	NC
1986	861	Zakspeed 1500/4 1.5 L4 t	G	(United Kingdom) Jonathan Palmer	Ret	Ret	Ret	12	13	Ret	8	Ret	9	Ret	10	Ret	Ret	12	10	9	0	NC
1986	861	Zakspeed 1500/4 1.5 L4 t	G	(Netherlands) Huub Rothengatter			Ret	DNQ	Ret	12	DNS	Ret	Ret	Ret	Ret	8	Ret	Ret	DNS	Ret	0	NC
1987	861; 871	Zakspeed 1500/4 1.5 L4 t	G		BRA	SMR	BEL	MON	DET	FRA	GBR	GER	HUN	AUT	ITA	POR	ESP	MEX	JPN	AUS	2*	10th
1987	861; 871	Zakspeed 1500/4 1.5 L4 t	G	(United Kingdom) Martin Brundle	Ret	5	Ret	7	Ret	Ret	NC	NC	Ret	DSQ	Ret	Ret	11	Ret	Ret	Ret	2*	10th
1987	861; 871	Zakspeed 1500/4 1.5 L4 t	G	(West Germany) Christian Danner	9	7	Ret	EX	8	Ret	Ret	Ret	Ret	9	9	Ret	Ret	Ret	Ret	7	2*	10th
1988	881	Zakspeed 1500/4 1.5 L4 t	G		BRA	SMR	MON	MEX	CAN	DET	FRA	GBR	GER	HUN	BEL	ITA	POR	ESP	JPN	AUS	0	NC
1988	881	Zakspeed 1500/4 1.5 L4 t	G	(West Germany) Bernd Schneider	DNQ	DNQ	DNQ	Ret	DNQ	DNQ	Ret	DNQ	12	DNQ	13	Ret	DNQ	DNQ	Ret	DNQ	0	NC
1988	881	Zakspeed 1500/4 1.5 L4 t	G	(Italy) Piercarlo Ghinzani	DNQ	Ret	Ret	15	14	DNQ	EX	DNQ	14	DNQ	Ret	Ret	DNQ	DNQ	DNQ	Ret	0	NC
1989	891	Yamaha OX88 3.5 V8	P		BRA	SMR	MON	MEX	USA	CAN	FRA	GBR	GER	HUN	BEL	ITA	POR	ESP	JPN	AUS	0	NC
1989	891	Yamaha OX88 3.5 V8	P	(West Germany) Bernd Schneider	Ret	DNPQ	DNPQ	DNPQ	DNPQ	DNPQ	DNPQ	DNPQ	DNPQ	DNPQ	DNPQ	DNPQ	DNPQ	DNPQ	Ret	DNPQ	0	NC
1989	891	Yamaha OX88 3.5 V8	P	(Japan) Aguri Suzuki	DNPQ	DNPQ	DNPQ	DNPQ	DNPQ	DNPQ	DNPQ	DNPQ	DNPQ	DNPQ	DNPQ	DNPQ	DNPQ	DNPQ	DNPQ	DNPQ	0	NC

* Points scored using 871 chassis

== Bibliography ==
- Christian Reinsch (8 December 2014). Zakspeed: … mehr als nur ein Rennteam (in German). VIEW Verlag. ISBN 978-3945397022.
- Robert Weber (March 2024). Automobilsport Racing / History / Passion #39: Zakspeed 1968–1989. Sportfahrer Verlag. ISSN 2199-126X.
