= 1985 German Grand Prix =

- Race 9 of 16 in the 1985 Formula One World Championship

Race details
- Date: 4 August 1985
- Official name: XLVII Großer Preis von Deutschland
- Location: Nürburgring, Nürburg, West Germany
- Course: Permanent racing facility
- Course length: 4.542 km (2.822 miles)
- Distance: 67 laps, 304.314 km (189.091 miles)
- Weather: Dry

Pole position
Driver	(Italy) Teo Fabi	Toleman-Hart
- Time: 1:17.429

Fastest lap
Driver	(Austria) Niki Lauda	McLaren-TAG
- Time: 1:22.806 on lap 53

Podium
First	(Italy) Michele Alboreto	Ferrari
Second	(France) Alain Prost	McLaren-TAG
Third	(France) Jacques Laffite	Ligier-Renault

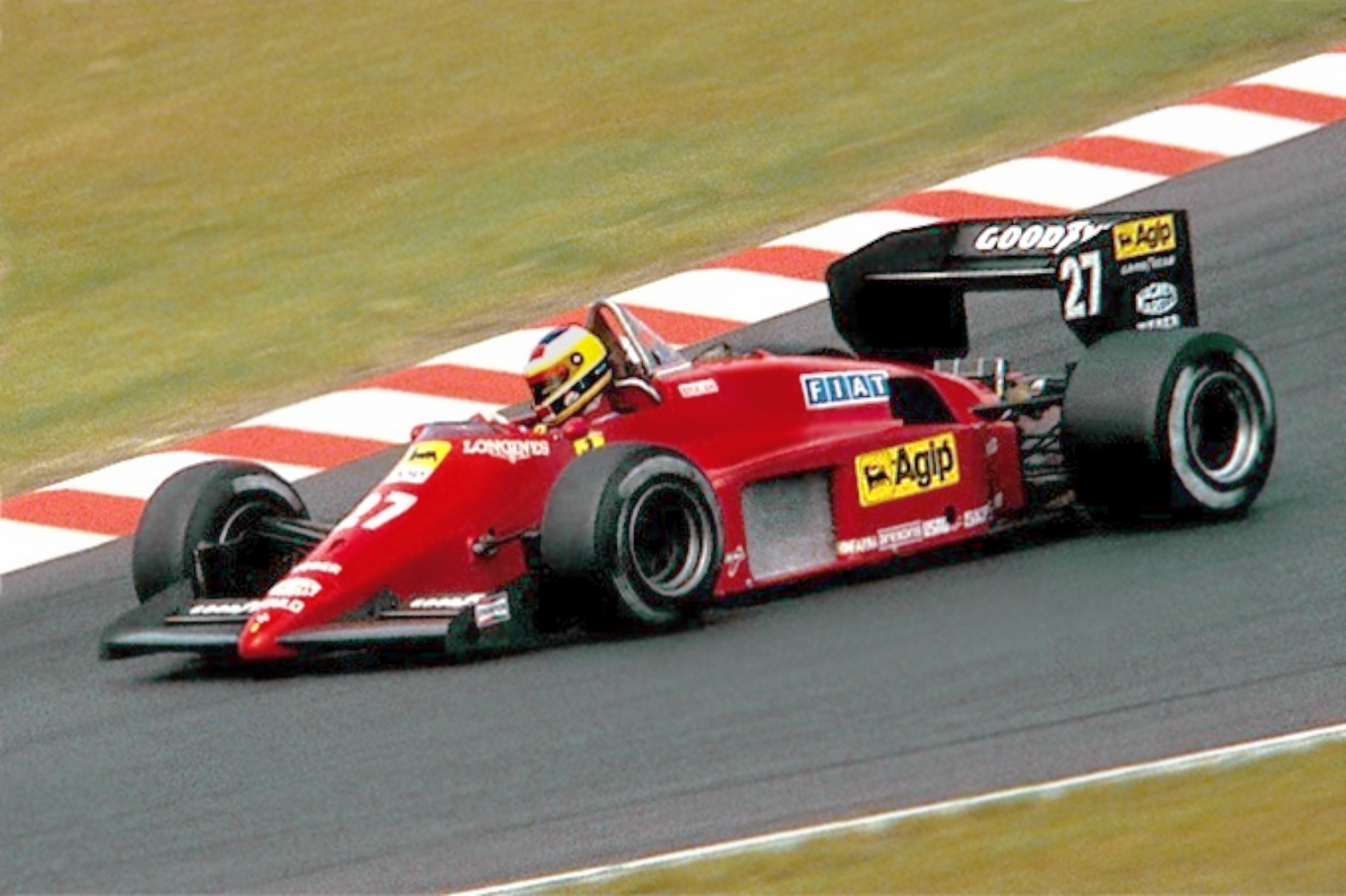
Michele Alboreto won the race for Ferrari.

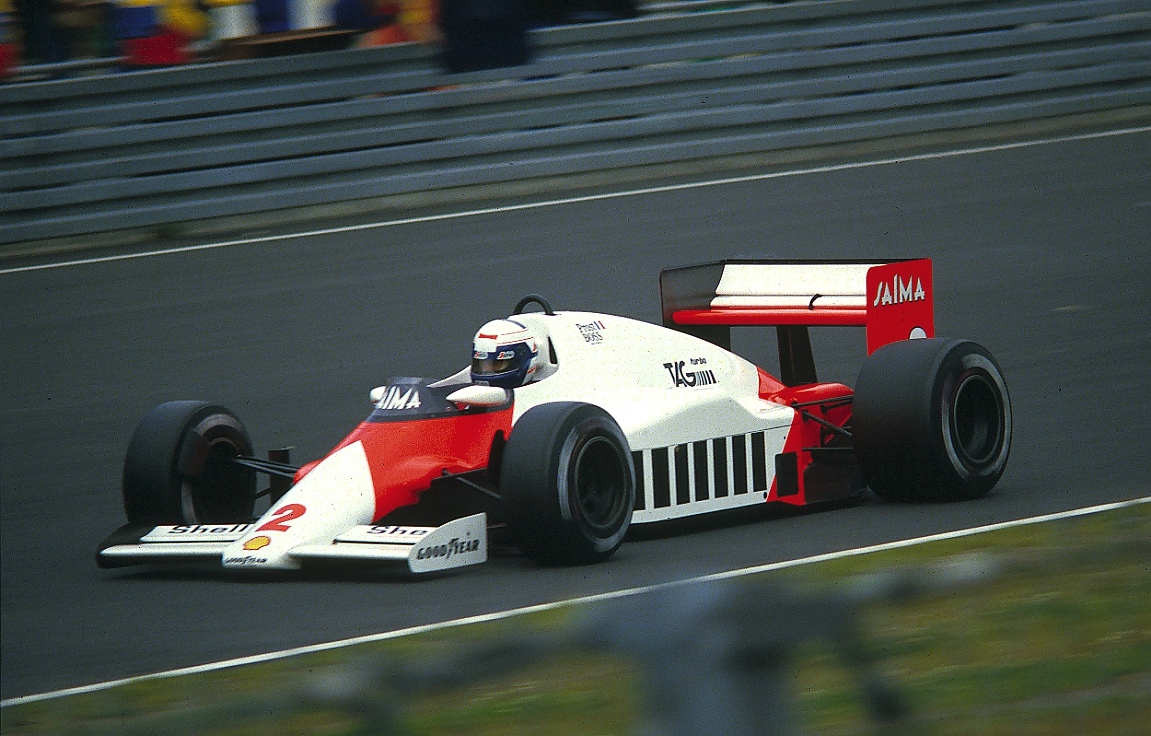
Alain Prost finished second, eleven seconds behind Alboreto.

The 1985 German Grand Prix was a Formula One motor race held at Nürburgring on 4 August 1985. It was the ninth race of the 1985 Formula One season.

This was the first German Grand Prix that was held on the new GP-Strecke section of the track that replaced the old Südschleife section that had not been used since 1970. It was also the first time in nine years the German GP was held at Nürburgring; previously the German Grand Prix had been held on the Nordschleife configuration until 1976, after which the Grand Prix was moved to the Hockenheimring, following Niki Lauda's near-fatal accident at the 1976 German Grand Prix. The GP-Strecke would not host another Grand Prix until the 1995 European Grand Prix, and would not host the German Grand Prix again until the 2009 edition.

Michele Alboreto won the race, his fifth and last Formula One victory. This event was the first occasion on which an onboard camera was used in a race; on François Hesnault's Renault car. That car was not eligible for championship points, and this race marked the last time that an F1 team entered more than two cars for a race.

As it was the German Grand Prix (and that the team still only had 1 new car built) Tyrrell team boss Ken Tyrrell gave his German driver Stefan Bellof use of the Renault powered Tyrrell 014 for the weekend instead of the car's usual driver Martin Brundle, who was given Bellof's Cosworth powered 012 to drive. To get around a FISA rule stating that a team and driver could not run more than 2 engines in the one chassis during a season (with the 012 running the Cosworth and 014 the Renault), Tyrrell simply switched the drivers from one car to the other but not their car numbers, meaning Bellof drove in car #3 and Brundle in car #4. Bellof qualified the turbo powered car 19th while Brundle was 26th and last with the Cosworth V8, some 10.2 seconds of Fabi's pole time and 6.4 seconds slower than his teammate in his usual car, something Brundle was reported to be not happy with. This was to be the last Grand Prix for Manfred Winkelhock: the German fatally crashed his Porsche 962C sportscar at the 1000 km of Mosport in Canada the following week. His son Markus would make his F1 debut 22 years later, on the same track.

As of 2026, Alboreto's win remains the last for an Italian driver driving for Ferrari in Formula One.

== Classification ==
=== Qualifying ===
Pole position went to Teo Fabi, the first of his career and the only pole for the Toleman team. He set his pole time during the Friday qualifying session; rain on Saturday meant that none of the drivers could improve their times.

Pos	No	Driver	Constructor	Q1	Q2	Gap
1	19	(Italy) Teo Fabi	Toleman-Hart	1:17.429		—
2	28	(Sweden) Stefan Johansson	Ferrari	1:18.616	1:46.919	+1.187
3	2	(France) Alain Prost	McLaren-TAG	1:18.725	1:43.088	+1.296
4	6	(Finland) Keke Rosberg	Williams-Honda	1:18.781	1:39.547	+1.352
5	12	(Brazil) Ayrton Senna	Lotus-Renault	1:18.792	1:36.471	+1.363
6	7	(Brazil) Nelson Piquet	Brabham-BMW	1:18.802	1:49.347	+1.373
7	11	(Italy) Elio de Angelis	Lotus-Renault	1:19.120	1:29.714	+1.691
8	27	(Italy) Michele Alboreto	Ferrari	1:19.194	1:41.490	+1.765
9	22	(Italy) Riccardo Patrese	Alfa Romeo	1:19.338		+1.909
10	5	(United Kingdom) Nigel Mansell	Williams-Honda	1:19.475	1:42.050	+2.046
11	8	(Switzerland) Marc Surer	Brabham-BMW	1:19.558	1:38.330	+2.129
12	1	(Austria) Niki Lauda	McLaren-TAG	1:19.562	1:44.330	+2.133
13	26	(France) Jacques Laffite	Ligier-Renault	1:19.656		+2.227
14	25	(Italy) Andrea de Cesaris	Ligier-Renault	1:19.738	1:39.623	+2.309
15	18	(Belgium) Thierry Boutsen	Arrows-BMW	1:19.781	1:54.674	+2.352
16	15	(France) Patrick Tambay	Renault	1:19.917	1:33.373	+2.488
17	17	(Austria) Gerhard Berger	Arrows-BMW	1:20.666	1:41.131	+3.237
18	23	(United States) Eddie Cheever	Alfa Romeo	1:21.074	1:32.376	+3.645
19	3	(West Germany) Stefan Bellof	Tyrrell-Renault	1:21.219	14:04.270	+3.790
20	16	(United Kingdom) Derek Warwick	Renault	1:21.237	1:46.773	+3.808
21	10	(France) Philippe Alliot	RAM-Hart	1:22.017		+4.588
22	9	(West Germany) Manfred Winkelhock	RAM-Hart	1:22.607	1:51.109	+5.178
23	14	(France) François Hesnault	Renault	1:23.161		+5.732
24	30	(United Kingdom) Jonathan Palmer	Zakspeed	1:24.217	1:51.833	+6.788
25	24	(Netherlands) Huub Rothengatter	Osella-Alfa Romeo	1:26.478		+9.049
26	4	(United Kingdom) Martin Brundle	Tyrrell-Ford	1:27.621	1:47.820	+10.192
27	29	(Italy) Pierluigi Martini	Minardi-Motori Moderni		1:40.506	+23.077

=== Race ===
Pos	No	Driver	Constructor	Laps	Time/Retired	Grid	Points
1	27	(Italy) Michele Alboreto	Ferrari	67	1:35:31.337	8	9
2	2	(France) Alain Prost	McLaren-TAG	67	+ 11.661	3	6
3	26	(France) Jacques Laffite	Ligier-Renault	67	+ 51.154	13	4
4	18	(Belgium) Thierry Boutsen	Arrows-BMW	67	+ 55.279	15	3
5	1	(Austria) Niki Lauda	McLaren-TAG	67	+ 1:13.972	12	2
6	5	(United Kingdom) Nigel Mansell	Williams-Honda	67	+ 1:16.820	10	1
7	17	(Austria) Gerhard Berger	Arrows-BMW	66	+ 1 Lap	17	
8	3	(West Germany) Stefan Bellof	Tyrrell-Renault	66	+ 1 Lap	19	
9	28	(Sweden) Stefan Johansson	Ferrari	66	+ 1 Lap	2	
10	4	(United Kingdom) Martin Brundle	Tyrrell-Ford	63	+ 4 Laps	26	
11	29	(Italy) Pierluigi Martini	Minardi-Motori Moderni	62	Engine	27	
12	6	(Finland) Keke Rosberg	Williams-Honda	61	Brakes	4	
Ret	23	(United States) Eddie Cheever	Alfa Romeo	45	Turbo	18	
Ret	11	(Italy) Elio de Angelis	Lotus-Renault	40	Engine	7	
Ret	24	(Netherlands) Huub Rothengatter	Osella-Alfa Romeo	32	Gearbox	25	
Ret	19	(Italy) Teo Fabi	Toleman-Hart	29	Clutch	1	
Ret	12	(Brazil) Ayrton Senna	Lotus-Renault	27	CV joint	5	
Ret	16	(United Kingdom) Derek Warwick	Renault	25	Ignition	20	
Ret	7	(Brazil) Nelson Piquet	Brabham-BMW	23	Turbo	6	
Ret	15	(France) Patrick Tambay	Renault	19	Spun Off	16	
Ret	8	(Switzerland) Marc Surer	Brabham-BMW	15	Engine	11	
Ret	9	(West Germany) Manfred Winkelhock	RAM-Hart	8	Engine	22	
Ret	22	(Italy) Riccardo Patrese	Alfa Romeo	8	Gearbox	9	
Ret	14	(France) François Hesnault	Renault	8	Clutch	23	
Ret	10	(France) Philippe Alliot	RAM-Hart	8	Oil pressure	21	
Ret	30	(United Kingdom) Jonathan Palmer	Zakspeed	7	Alternator	24	
Ret	25	(Italy) Andrea de Cesaris	Ligier-Renault	0	Collision	14	

== Championship standings after the race ==
Drivers' Championship standings

Pos	Driver	Points
1	(Italy) Michele Alboreto	46
2	(France) Alain Prost	41
3	(Italy) Elio de Angelis	26
4	(Finland) Keke Rosberg	18
5	(Sweden) Stefan Johansson	16

Constructors' Championship standings

Pos	Constructor	Points
1	(Italy) Ferrari	65
2	(United Kingdom) McLaren-TAG	46
3	(United Kingdom) Lotus-Renault	35
4	(United Kingdom) Williams-Honda	24
5	(France) Renault	15

- Note: Only the top five positions are included for both sets of standings.

Previous race: 1985 British Grand Prix	FIA Formula One World Championship; 1985 season	Next race: 1985 Austrian Grand Prix
Previous race: 1984 German Grand Prix; Previous race at the Nürburgring: 1984 European Grand Prix	German Grand Prix	Next race: 1986 German Grand Prix; Next race at the Nürburgring: 1995 European Grand Prix
