= West (cigarette) =

Cigarette brand

- Product type: Cigarette
- Current owner: Imperial Tobacco
- Produced by: Reemtsma
- Country: Germany
- Introduced: 1981; 45 years ago
- Markets: See Markets
- Tagline: "Let's go West!", "Test the West!"

West is a German brand of cigarettes, owned and manufactured by the British tobacco corporation Imperial Brands.

== History ==
West was introduced to the German market in 1981 and initially were only available in specialised tobacco shops. The launch of the new brand was accompanied by a dynamic advertising campaign under the slogan "Let's go West!". Thanks to a successful pricing policy and positioning quality at a reasonable price, a year later the brand became one of the leading in Germany. Since approximately 1987 West became available in supermarkets and cigarette vending machines. West is the second-strongest cigarette brand in Germany.

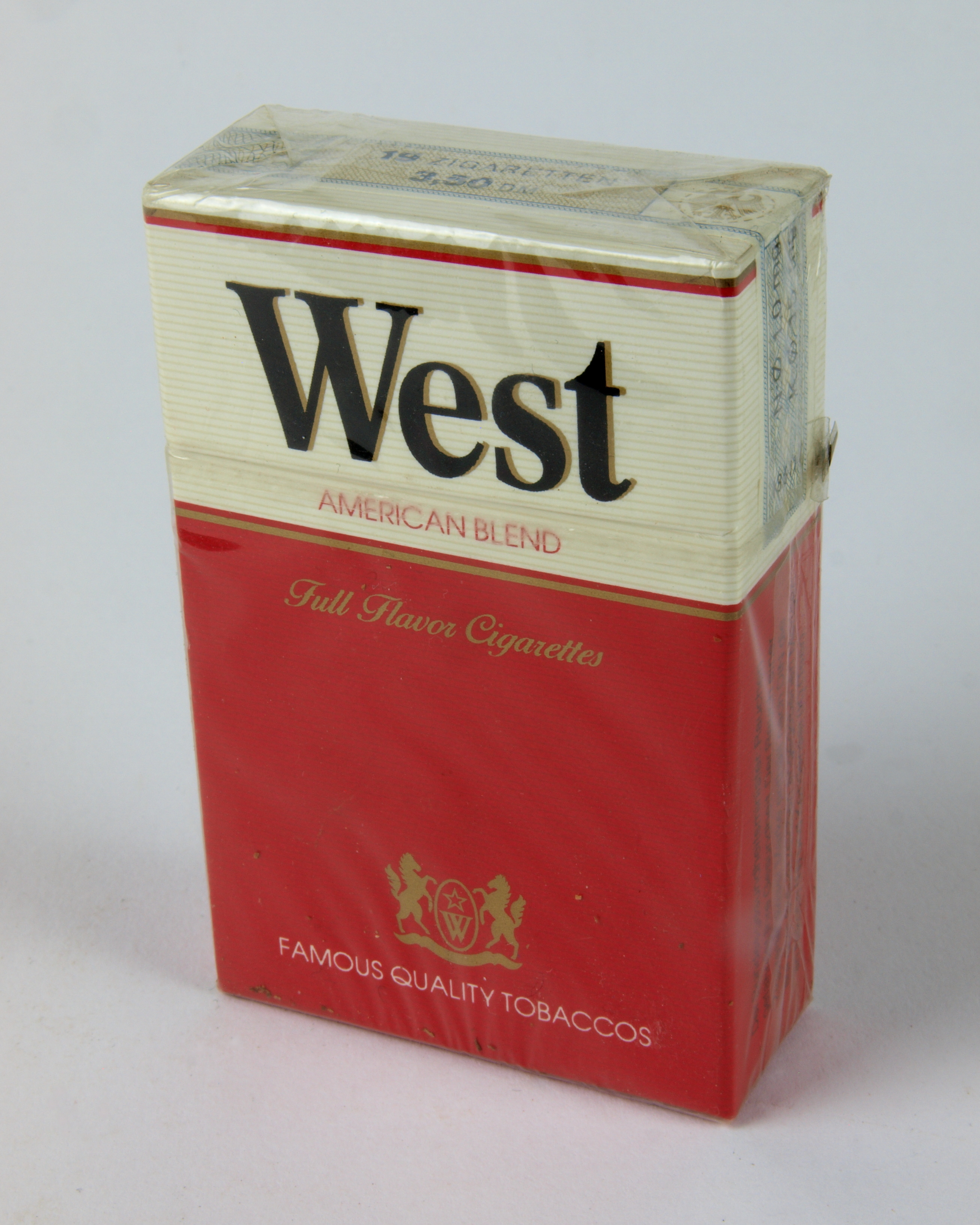
German pack of West cigarettes of 1981

In 1986, a new "Test the West!" advertising campaign was launched; the simplicity and originality of the new marketing strategies have been cited as key factors behind the uptick in brand recognition that was soon to follow. The campaign employed a strategy of placing paid promoters inside pubs, bars, restaurants and discotheques from which brand interest could be driven directly; in particular, by encouraging young people to engage in blindfolded product comparisons between West cigarettes and their current cigarette brand of choice.

In 1989, West Lights were introduced. The expansion of the range and the high demand for West cigarettes made it possible in two years to begin sales in Central and Eastern Europe.

In July 1995, it was reported that West was one of the most popular brands in the former German Democratic Republic, with the cigarette maker Philip Morris International declaring the total market share of international brands to have risen by almost 10% (to 39%) during the preceding 5-year span; the survey, conducted by Philip Morris Marktforschung, also showed that the former GDR brands had collectively endured losses of around 8% during the same timeframe. Nevertheless, with a total market share of 28.6%, in 1995 f6 remained the most popular cigarette smoked in the former GDR.

In Poland, West became widely available in the mid-1990s, the brand was advertised by actor Bogusław Linda in 1996.

In Russia, sales of West began in 1997, initially the cigarettes were available in two versions (Full Flavor and Lights) with a classic filter. The appearance of the new brand was accompanied by the advertising campaigns "The taste of now" and "The power of now", which started a year earlier in Europe.

In 1999, to promote the brand, the company used the provocative advertising campaign "USE", which is the continuation of "Test the West!". The images used to popularize the brand had also become bolder. On the advertising posters, West's characters turn out to be in intriguing and unconventional situations: for example, a girl confesses and smokes together with a priest in a confession. The slogan of the campaign is "Equality for All". According to its results, West brand reached 11% of the share of the cigarette market in Germany.

In July 1999, West cigarettes became available in the U.K.

To increase the competitiveness of the brand in Russia, the brand's specialists developed an innovative Streamtec filter in the form of a propeller, and in 2000 the brand was relaunched.

In the early 2000s, the brand continued its active development. Thanks to the partnership with the McLaren F1 team, West's profile was raised. In production, West ST Ultra cigarettes were launched. Debut sales of West in Africa.

In 2004, "Hongta Group" announced it would produce the cigarettes in China.

Since 2009 there has been a significant expansion of the West line in the Russian market. West Tri Logic cigarettes with low levels of tar and nicotine and West Fusion were produced - standard length cigarettes in Super Slims format. The following year, the production of West SSL cigarettes began in a super-thin format. A year later, the launch of the production of West Compact format Queen size and West Duo classic King Size with a menthol capsule in the filter.

In January 2010, Imperial Tobacco announced a change in the design of the West cigarettes. Through the fresh design, the company said it was making "a conscious effort for innovation and to create something that is both functional and aesthetically pleasing for our adult smokers".

== Marketing ==
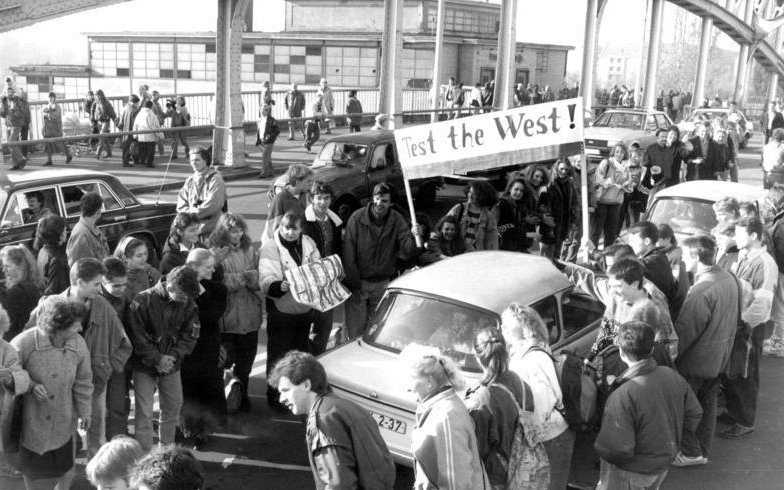
Already the day after the Fall of the Berlin Wall, on 10 Nov 1989, West Germans with a self-made "Test the West" banner greet East Germans in their little Trabant cars

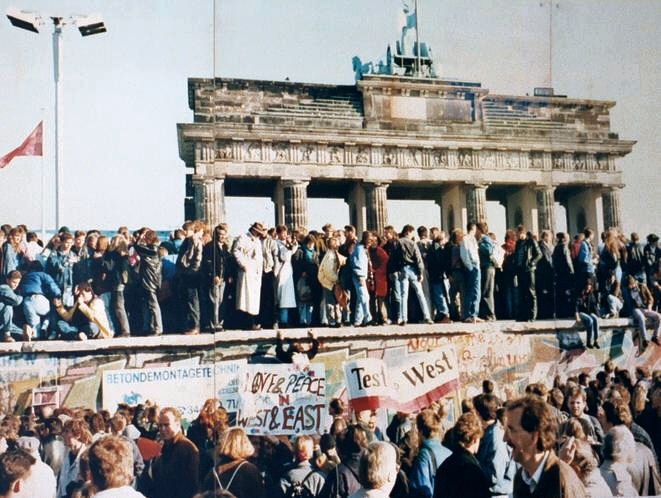
Same banner carried later on at the Berlin Wall near the Brandenburg Gate

=== Advertising campaigns ===
For a long time West cigarettes were advertised with more and more different campaigns. In 2003, the advertising campaign ("Für....") was carried out on Germany's posters and advertising pillars. The motifs showed the new seasonal pack edition of West. So there are a total of 5 different motifs painted in national colors faces from Germany, France, England, Italy and Brazil. The faces on the packs are representative of the enthusiasm and internationality in the country, which can be triggered for example by a FIFA World Cup. West also issued special editions of cigarette packaging: West Summer Edition, West Ostern Edition, West Cola, West in Space Edition, Fest (Christmas cigarettes) and West Lemon Fresh were briefly introduced.

=== Test the West ===
From 1986 onwards, the brand used the slogan "Test the West!", with regular attarctive models offering the cigarette to somewhat weird persons. The campaign was discussed among art historians.

In the days after the fall of the Berlin Wall, selfmade banners with the slogan showed up. Similar to German brand Wodka Gorbatschow, the company made good use of current events, to gain name recognition in the former German Democratic Republic and even in Moscow.

== Sponsorship ==
=== Motor racing ===
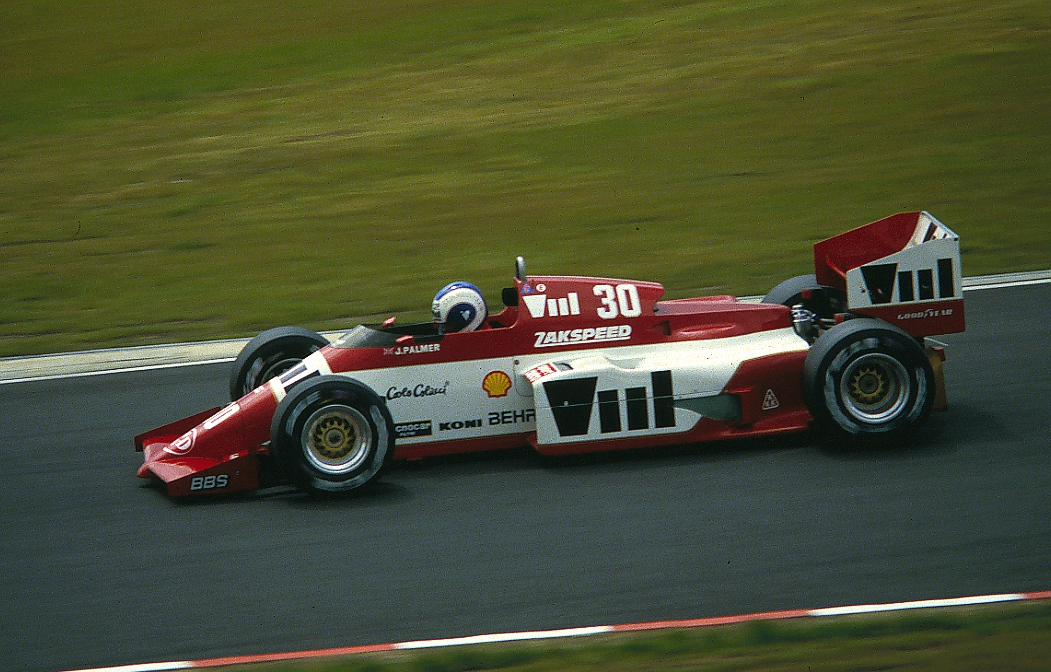
At the 1985 German GP, the logo had to be covered

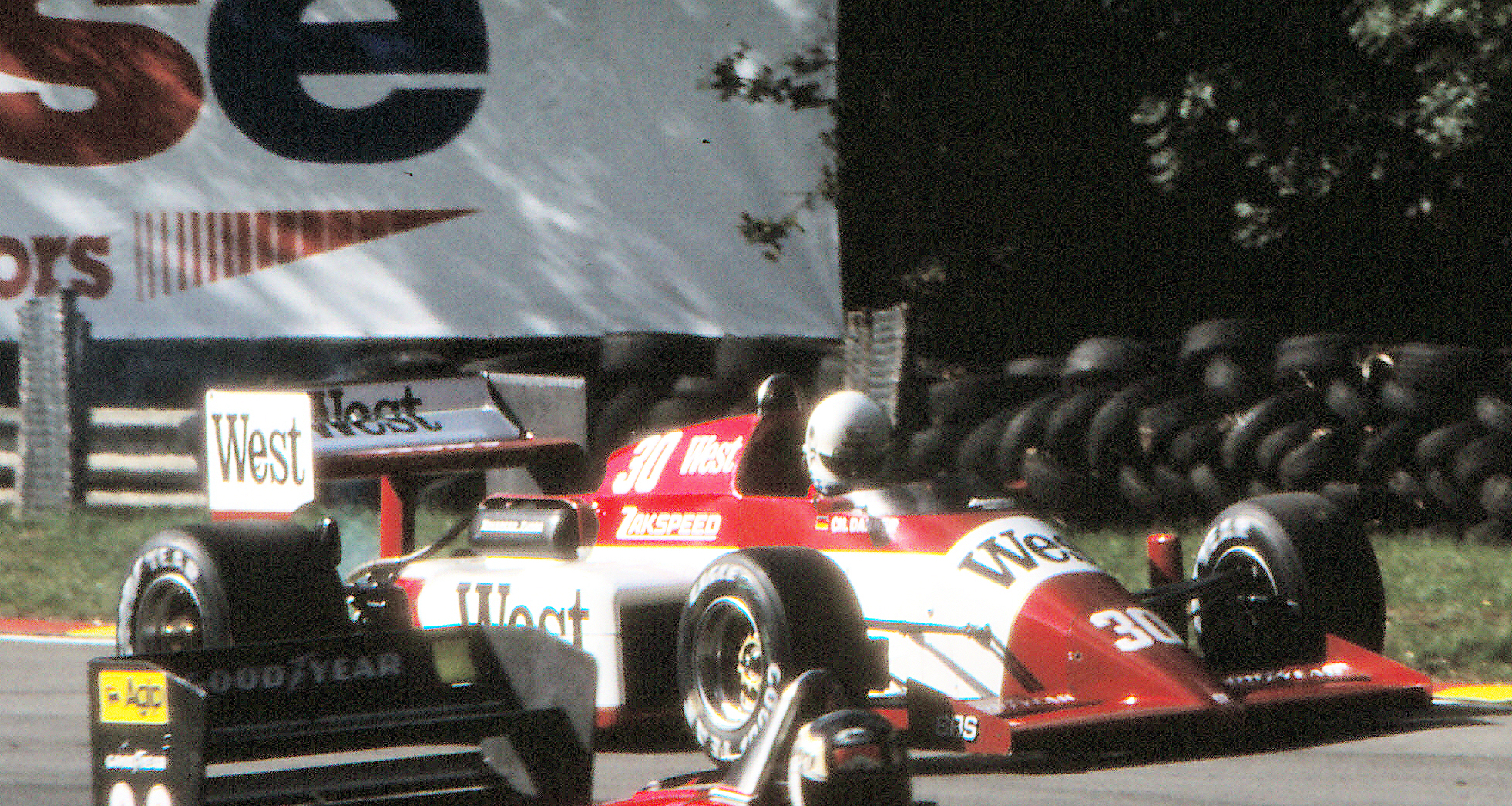
Visible West at the 1985 Europe GP, Brands Hatch

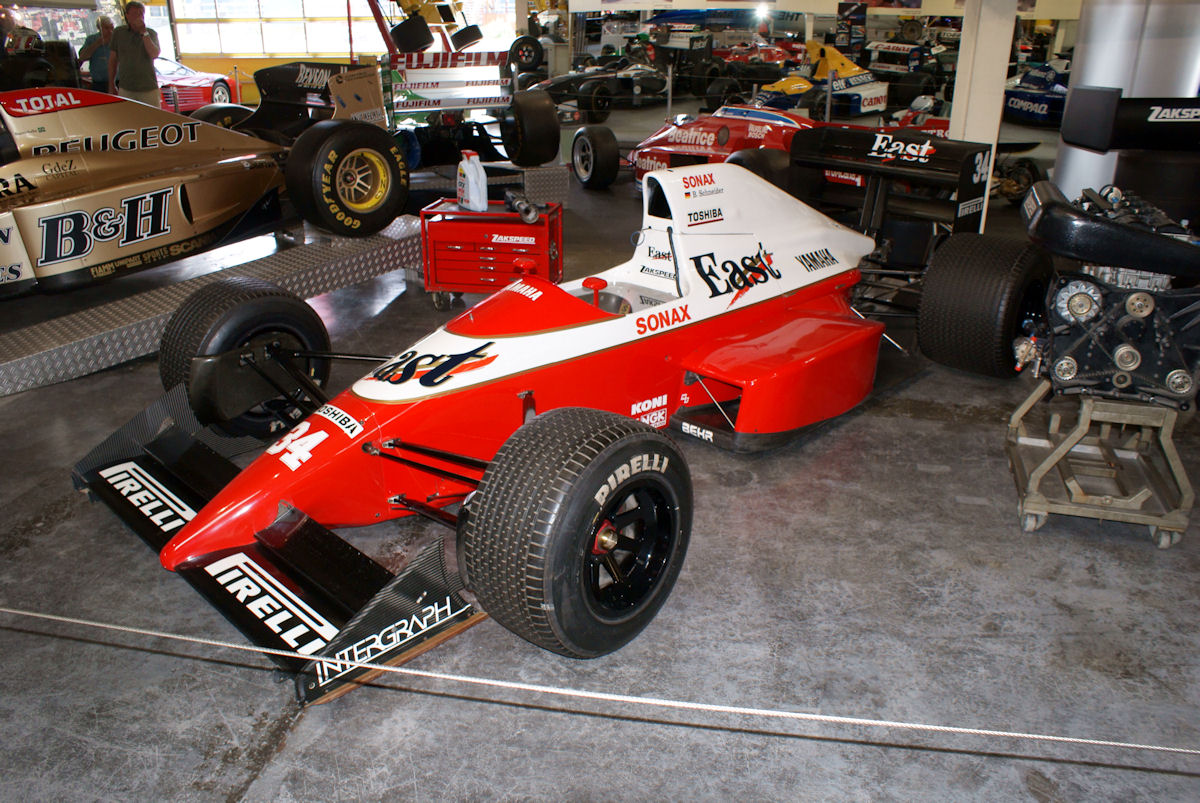
East on a 1989 Zakspeed 891-Yamaha

West became the main sponsor of the small German Formula One team Zakspeed. The best result of the team was Martin Brundle's 5th place at the 1987 San Marino Grand Prix. Sponsorship continued until 1989, after which the team left the competition. Due to restrictions, the name was occasionally covered or changed to East.

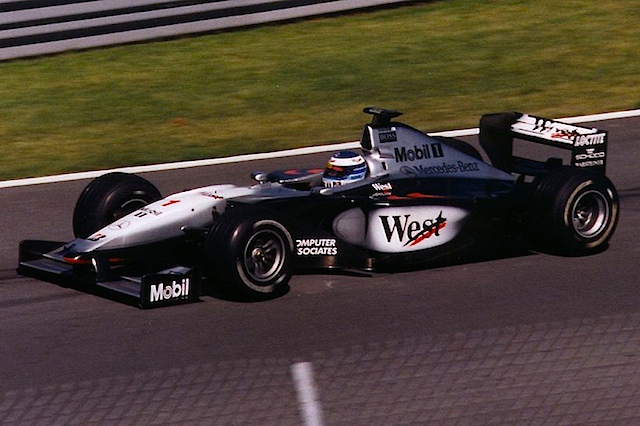
Mika Häkkinen in a 1999 McLaren sponsored by West.

West was also the sponsor of the McLaren Formula One team (known as "West McLaren Mercedes") from 1997 to 2005. West terminated its relationship with McLaren due to a European Union ban on tobacco advertising in 2005 and Vodafone and Emirates became their primary sponsor from 2006 onwards. In countries where tobacco advertising already was banned on a local level (like Germany and France), West used certain logos, covered the West logos with black gaps, put the first names of the drivers ("Mika" for Mika Häkkinen, "David" for David Coulthard, "Juan Pablo" for Juan Pablo Montoya, "Kimi" for Kimi Räikkönen, and so on) or put "East" on their cars, referring to East Germany at the time to circumvent those laws.

In Argentina, West sponsored the Turismo Carretera team's Ford Falcon cars, made up of Juan María Traverso and the brothers Oscar Aventín and Antonio Aventín in 1983.

=== Motorcycle racing ===
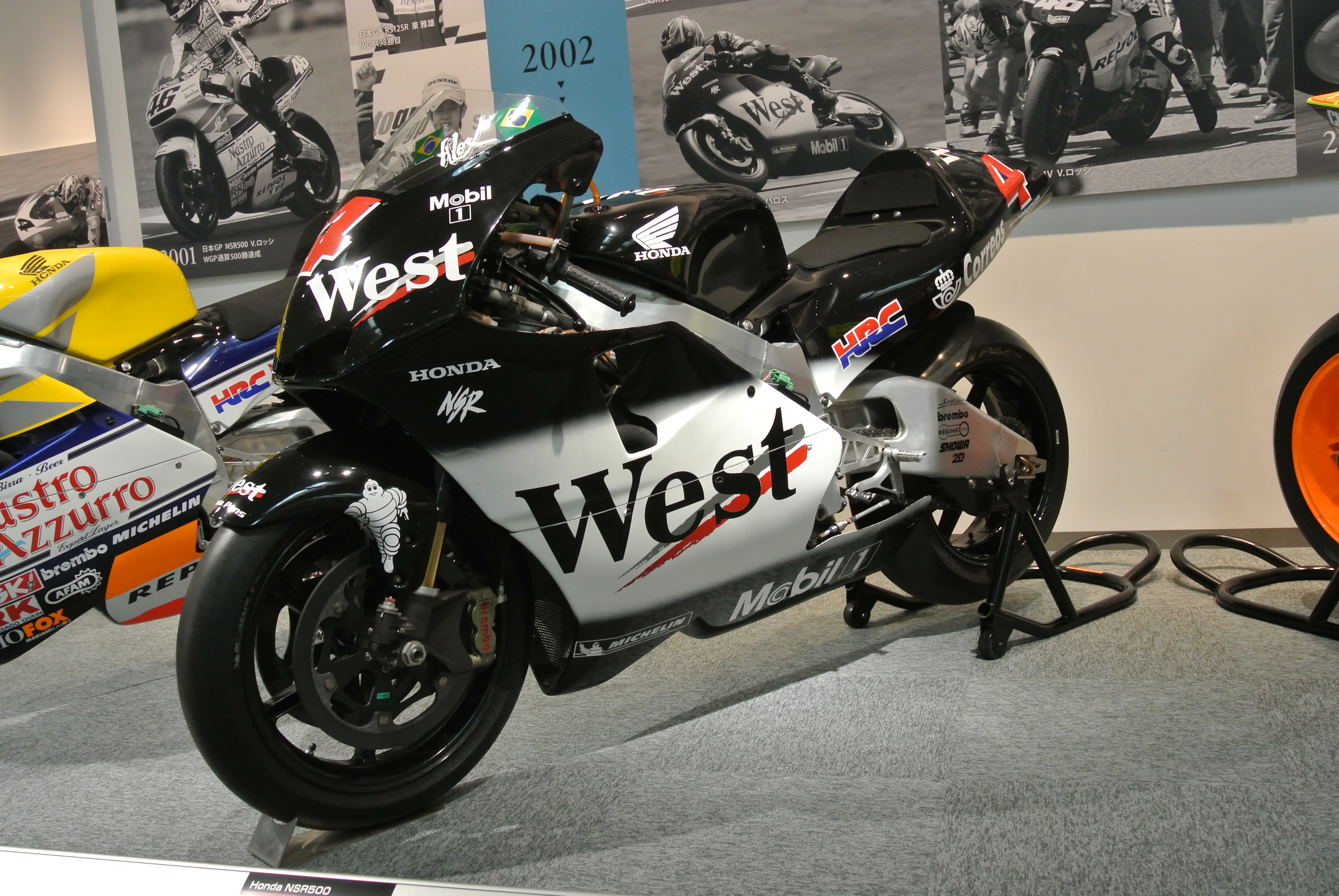
The 2002 Sito Pons West Honda NSR500 of Alex Barros on display.

West was the primary sponsor of Sito Pons' MotoGP team from 2000 to 2002, when Camel became their main sponsor from 2003 onwards. The best result in this period was shown by Loris Capirossi, finishing third in the 2001 500cc season. In countries where tobacco advertising was banned on a local level (like Germany and France), West put the first names of the riders ("Alex" for Alex Barros, "Loris" for Loris Capirossi and so on) on the front and sides of the bikes to circumvent those laws.

=== Other sports ===
West sponsored the Slovak Extraliga from 1997 to 2001. West also sponsored numerous amateur cage fighters. West also sponsored Ferencváros during their first season in the UEFA Champions League in 1995–96.

== Markets ==
West is mainly sold in Germany, but also was or still is sold in the United Arab Emirates, Luxembourg, Belgium, the Netherlands, Finland, Austria, Portugal, Spain, Italy, Lithuania, Poland, Romania, Hungary, Czech Republic, Slovakia, Slovenia, North Macedonia, Bosnia and Herzegovina, Serbia, Kosovo, Algeria, Argentina, Greece, Turkey, Egypt, Costa Rica Azerbaijan, Estonia, Belarus, Ukraine, Russia, Kazakhstan, Mongolia, China, Taiwan, Hong Kong, United States and Brazil.

== Products ==
Cigarettes

- West Red, 10 mg tar, 0.9 mg nicotine, 10 mg carbon monoxide.
- West Silver (formerly known as West Light), 7 mg tar, 0.6 mg nicotine, 7 mg carbon monoxide.
- West Blue, 4 mg tar, 0.4 mg nicotine, 4 mg carbon monoxide.
- West Rich Blue, 8 mg tar, 0.7 mg nicotine, 8 mg carbon monoxide.
- West ICE (a spearmint flavored menthol cigarette), 7 mg tar, 0.6 mg nicotine, 7 mg carbon monoxide. Part of the flavoring is added to the filter instead of the tobacco.

West Red and Silver cigarettes are also available in 100 mm length, as well as the standard 91 mm.

Other products

- West Volumetabak Red and Silver, loose tobacco for roll-your-own cigarettes.
- West Rollies Filter Red and Silver, cigarillos with filter.
