= 1993 FIA Touring Car Challenge =

1993 FIA Touring Car World Cup

Seasons
- ← none 1994 →

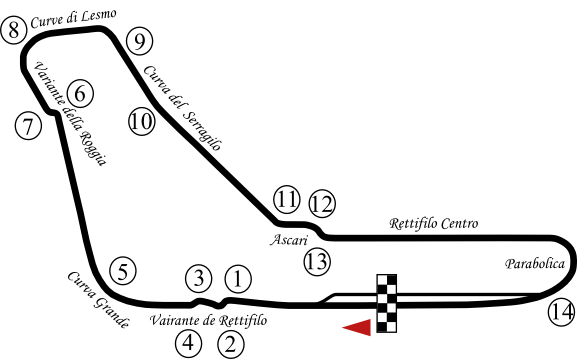
Layout of the Autodromo Nazionale di Monza (1976–1993)

The 1993 FIA Touring Car Challenge was the first running of the FIA Touring Car World Cup. It was held on 17 October 1993 at the Autodromo Nazionale di Monza in Italy. Paul Radisich won the event after winning both races, while Italy was the winning nation.

== Entry list ==
Nation	No	Driver	Entrant	Car	1993 Championship
Australia	1	Tony Longhurst	BMW Motorsport Team Bigazzi	BMW 318i	Australian Touring Car Championship
Australia	2	Mark Skaife	Nissan Castrol Racing	Nissan Primera	Australian Touring Car Championship
Belgium	3	Éric Bachelart	Peugeot Belgium	Peugeot 405	Belgian Touring Car Championship
Belgium	4	Marc Duez	Valier Motorsport	BMW 318i	Belgian Touring Car Championship
Belgium	5	Eric van de Poele	Nissan Castrol Racing	Nissan Primera	French Supertouring Championship
Belgium	7	Thierry Tassin	BMW Motorsport Team Schnitzer	BMW 318i	Belgian Touring Car Championship
Switzerland	9	Bernard Thuner	Eggenberger Motorsport	Peugeot 405	unknown
Germany	11	Frank Biela	ROC Competition	Audi 80	French Supertouring Championship
Germany	12	Alexander Burgstaller	BMW Motorsport Team Bigazzi	BMW 318i	Italian Superturismo Championship
Germany	13	Christian Danner	Schubel Engineering	Alfa Romeo 155	Deutsche Tourenwagen Meisterschaft
Germany	14	Franz Engstler	Schubel Engineering	Alfa Romeo 155	German Touring Car Championship (Class 2)
Germany	15	Hans-Joachim Stuck	ROC Competition	Audi 80	24 Hours of Le Mans
Germany	16	Joachim Winkelhock	BMW Motorsport Team Schnitzer	BMW 318i	British Touring Car Championship
France	17	Laurent Aïello	FINA Team Oreca	BMW 318i	French Supertouring Championship
France	18	Paul Belmondo	Opel France	Opel Vectra	French Supertouring Championship
France	19	Christophe Bouchut	Peugeot Talbot Sport	Peugeot 405	French Supertouring Championship
France	20	Alain Cudini	Opel France	Opel Vectra	French Supertouring Championship
France	21	Phillipe Gache	Fiat Auto France	Alfa Romeo 155	French Supertouring Championship
France	22	Yannick Dalmas	Peugeot Talbot Sport	Peugeot 405	French Supertouring Championship
France	23	Jean-Pierre Malcher	FINA Team Oreca	BMW 318i	French Supertouring Championship
France	24	Marc Sourd	ROC Competition	Audi 80	French Supertouring Championship
(United Kingdom) Great Britain	25	Julian Bailey	Team Securicor Toyota	Toyota Carina	British Touring Car Championship
(United Kingdom) Great Britain	26	John Cleland	Vauxhall Sport	Vauxhall Cavalier	British Touring Car Championship
(United Kingdom) Great Britain	27	Robb Gravett	Peugeot Talbot Sport	Peugeot 405	British Touring Car Championship
(United Kingdom) Great Britain	28	Will Hoy	Team Securicor Toyota	Toyota Carina	British Touring Car Championship
(United Kingdom) Great Britain	29	David Leslie	Ecurie Ecosse	Vauxhall Cavalier	British Touring Car Championship
(United Kingdom) Great Britain	30	Kieth O'Dor	Nissan Castrol Racing	Nissan Primera	British Touring Car Championship
(United Kingdom) Great Britain	31	Andy Rouse	Ford Team Mondeo	Ford Mondeo	British Touring Car Championship
(United Kingdom) Great Britain	32	Steve Soper	BMW Motorsport Team Schnitzer	BMW 318i	British Touring Car Championship
Italy	33	Ivan Capelli	Nissan Castrol Racing	Nissan Primera	Italian Superturismo Championship
Italy	34	Fabrizio Giovanardi	Peugeot Talbot Italia	Peugeot 405	Italian Superturismo Championship
Italy	35	Nicola Larini	Alfa Corse	Alfa Romeo 155	Deutsche Tourenwagen Meisterschaft
Italy	36	Stefano Modena	Euroteam	BMW 318i	Italian Superturismo Championship
Italy	37	Alessandro Nannini	Alfa Corse	Alfa Romeo 155	Italian Superturismo Championship
Italy	38	Emanuele Pirro	CiBiEmme	BMW 318i	Italian Superturismo Championship
Italy	39	Roberto Ravaglia	CiBiEmme	BMW 318i	Italian Superturismo Championship
Italy	40	Gabriele Tarquini	Alfa Corse	Alfa Romeo 155	Italian Superturismo Championship
New Zealand	41	Paul Radisich	Ford Team Mondeo	Ford Mondeo	British Touring Car Championship
Portugal	42	Ni Amorim	TPM Opel Motorsport	Opel Astra	Portuguese Touring Car Championship
Sweden	43	Per-Gunnar Andersson	Peggen Motorsport	BMW 318i	Nordic Touring Car Championship
Sweden	44	Slim Borgudd	Mazda Cars	Mazda Xedos 6	none
Venezuela	45	Johnny Cecotto	BMW Motorsport Team Bigazzi	BMW 318i	Italian Superturismo Championship
South Africa	49	Deon Joubert	BMW South Africa	BMW 318i	South African Touring Car Championship

- Alain Menu was unable to compete for Switzerland due to injury. He would have driven a Renault 19.
- Vaclav Bervid appeared on the entry list for the Czech Republic, but did not participate.
- Jean-Pierre Jabouille originally appeared on the entry list for France, but was replaced by Yannick Dalmas for an unknown reason.

== Results ==
Two sessions of qualifying were held one for cars with even and one for cars with odd numbers.

=== Qualifying ===
Pos	No	Driver	Car	Lap Time
1	41	(New Zealand) Paul Radisich	Ford Mondeo Si	**1:54.520**
2	22	(France) Yannick Dalmas	Peugeot 405	1:54.600
3	35	(Italy) Nicola Larini	Alfa Romeo 155 TS	1:55.032
4	20	(France) Alain Cudini	Opel Vectra GT	1:54.897
5	27	(United Kingdom) Robb Gravett	Peugeot 405	1:55.162
6	16	(Germany) Joachim Winkelhock	BMW 318i	1:55.276
7	19	(France) Christophe Bouchut	Peugeot 405	1:55.281
8	34	(Italy) Fabrizio Giovanardi	Peugeot 405	1:55.770
9	31	(United Kingdom) Andy Rouse	Ford Mondeo Si	1:55.329
10	38	(Italy) Emanuele Pirro	BMW 318i	1:55.643
11	5	(Belgium) Eric van de Poele	Nissan Primera GTE	1:55.484
12	30	(United Kingdom) Kieth O'Dor	Nissan Primera GTE	1:55.484
13	29	(United Kingdom) David Leslie	Vauxhall Cavalier GSi	1:55.484
14	32	(United Kingdom) Steve Soper	BMW 318i	1:55.835
15	17	(France) Laurent Aiello	BMW 318i	1:55.594
16	12	(Germany) Alexander Burgstaller	BMW 318i	1:56.207
17	45	(Venezuela) Johnny Cecotto	BMW 318i	1:55.657
18	26	(United Kingdom) John Cleland	Vauxhall Cavalier GSi	1:56.233
19	39	(Italy) Roberto Ravaglia	BMW 318i	1:55.720
20	24	(France) Marc Sourd	Audi 80 Quattro	1:56.979
21	37	(Italy) Alessandro Nannini	Alfa Romeo 155 TS	1:56.099
22	18	(France) Paul Belmondo	Opel Vectra GT	1:54.897
23	33	(Italy) Ivan Capelli	Nissan Primera GTE	1:56.662
24	2	(Australia) Mark Skaife	Nissan Primera GTE	1:56.662
25	25	(United Kingdom) Julian Bailey	Toyota Carina E GT	1:56.764
26	28	(United Kingdom) Will Hoy	Toyota Carina E GT	1:57.139
27	21	(France) Philippe Gache	Alfa Romeo 155 TS	1:56.913
28	36	(Italy) Stefano Modena	BMW 318iS	1:57.182
29	1	(Australia) Tony Longhurst	BMW 318iS	1:56.970
30	4	(Belgium) Marc Duez	BMW 318i	1:57.380
31	13	(Germany) Christian Danner	Alfa Romeo 155 TS	1:56.991
32	43	(South Africa) Deon Joubert	BMW 318i	1:57.516
33	23	(France) Jean-Pierre Malcher	BMW 318i	1:57.009
34	44	(Sweden) Slim Borgudd	Mazda Xedos 6	1:57.665
35	11	(Germany) Frank Biela	Audi 80 Quattro	1:57.111
36	42	(Portugal) Ni Amorim	Opel Astra	1:58.019
37	15	(Germany) Hans Joachim Stuck	Audi 80 Quattro	1:57.692
38	14	(Germany) Franz Engstler	Alfa Romeo 155 TS	1:58.141
39	7	(Belgium) Thierry Tassin	BMW 318i	1:57.929
40	40	(Italy) Gabriele Tarquini	Alfa Romeo 155 TS	1:58.436
41	3	(Belgium) Éric Bachelart	Peugeot 405	1:58.275
42	9	(Switzerland) Bernard Thuner	Peugeot 405	1:58.377
43	43	(Sweden) Per-Gunnar Andersson	BMW 318i	1:58.815

=== Races ===
**Race 1**

Pos	No	Driver	Constructor	Laps	Time/Retired	Grid	Points
1	41	(New Zealand) **Paul Radisich**	Ford Mondeo	15	32:17.790	1	40
2	20	(France) Alain Cudini	Opel Vectra	15	+1.517	4	30
3	35	(Italy) Nicola Larini	Alfa Romeo 155	15	+3.607	3	24
4	26	(United Kingdom) John Cleland	Vauxhall Cavalier	15	+3.716	18	20
5	37	(Italy) Alessandro Nannini	Alfa Romeo 155	15	+5.679	21	16
6	22	(France) Yannick Dalmas	Peugeot 405	15	+16.505	2	15
7	16	(Germany) Joachim Winkelhock	BMW 318i	15	+17.596	6	14
8	27	(United Kingdom) Robb Gravett	Peugeot 405	15	+17.596	5	13
9	25	(United Kingdom) Julian Bailey	Toyota Carina	15	+20.498	25	12
10	19	(France) Christophe Bouchut	Peugeot 405	15	+21.165	7	11
11	12	(Germany) Alexander Burgstaller	BMW 318i	15	+28.688	16	10
12	21	(France) Philippe Gache	Alfa Romeo 155	15	+31.202	27	9
13	45	(Venezuela) Johnny Cecotto	BMW 318i	15	+31.899	17	8
14	14	(Germany) Franz Engstler	Alfa Romeo 155	15	+35.990	38	7
15	34	(Italy) Fabrizio Giovanardi	Peugeot 405	15	+40.553	8	6
16	23	(France) Jean-Pierre Malcher	BMW 318i	15	+41.277	33	5
17	28	(United Kingdom) Will Hoy	Toyota Carina	15	+46.546	26	4
18	5	(Belgium) Eric van de Poele	Nissan Primera	15	+47.552	11	3
19	11	(Germany) Frank Biela	Audi 80 Quattro	15	+48.682	35	2
20	24	(France) Marc Sourd	Audi 80 Quattro	15	+57.615	20	1
21	15	(Germany) Hans Joachim Stuck	Audi 80 Quattro	15	+59.214	37	
23	44	(Sweden) Slim Borgudd	Mazda Xedos 6	15	+1.04.944	34	
24	4	(Belgium) Marc Duez	BMW 318i	15	+1.06.444	30	
25	33	(Italy) Ivan Capelli	Nissan Primera	15	+1.08.643	23	
26	36	(Italy) Stefano Modena	BMW 318i	15	+1.11.493	28	
27	9	(Switzerland) Bernard Thuner	Peugeot 405	15	+1.12.275	42	
28	42	(Portugal) Ni Amorim	Opel Astra	15	+1.18.508	36	
29	1	(Australia) Tony Longhurst	BMW 318i	15	+1.24.203	29	
30	18	(France) Paul Belmondo	Opel Vectra	15	+1.25.040	22	
31	30	(United Kingdom) Kieth O'Dor	Nissan Primera	15	+1.28.556	12	
32	43	(Sweden) Per-Gunnar Andersson	BMW 318i	15	+1.29.545	43	
33	2	(Australia) Mark Skaife	Nissan Primera	15	+1.55.984	24	
34	7	(Belgium) Thierry Tassin	BMW 318i	14	+1 lap	39	
35	38	(Italy) Emanuele Pirro	BMW 318i	14	+1 lap	10	
36	29	(United Kingdom) David Leslie	Vauxhall Cavalier	11	+4 lap	13	
37	13	(Germany) Christian Danner	Alfa Romeo 155	10	+5 lap	31	
38	39	(Italy) Roberto Ravaglia	BMW 318i	9	+6 lap	19	
39	43	(South Africa) Deon Joubert	BMW 318i	9	+6 lap	32	
Ret	31	(United Kingdom) Andy Rouse	Ford Mondeo	1	+15 laps	9	
Ret	3	(Belgium) Eric Bachelart	Peugeot 405	1	+15 laps	41	
Ret	17	(France) Laurent Aiello	BMW 318i	1	+15 laps	15	
Ret	32	(United Kingdom) Steve Soper	BMW 318i	1	+15 laps	14	

**Race 2**

Pos	No	Driver	Constructor	Laps	Time/Retired	Grid	Points
1	41	(New Zealand) **Paul Radisich**	Ford Mondeo	15	34:52.203	1	40
2	35	(Italy) Nicola Larini	Alfa Romeo 155	15	+0.662	3	30
3	21	(France) Philippe Gache	Alfa Romeo 155	15	+2.142	12	24
4	12	(Germany) Alexander Burgstaller	BMW 318i	15	+4.891	11	20
5	5	(Belgium) Eric van de Poele	Nissan Primera	15	+5.619	18	16
6	38	(Italy) Emanuele Pirro	BMW 318i	15	+6.241	35	15
7	36	(Italy) Stefano Modena	BMW 318i	15	+6.774	26	14
8	23	(France) Jean-Pierre Malcher	BMW 318i	15	+6.932	16	13
9	19	(France) Christophe Bouchut	Peugeot 405	15	+7.074	10	12
10	40	(Italy) Gabriele Tarquini	Alfa Romeo 155	15	+7.486	22	11
11	13	(Germany) Christian Danner	Alfa Romeo 155	15	+7.520	37	10
12	4	(Belgium) Marc Duez	BMW 318i	15	+9.214	24	9
13	33	(Italy) Ivan Capelli	Nissan Primera	15	+9.261	25	8
14	1	(Australia) Tony Longhurst	BMW 318i	15	+10.656	29	7
15	39	(Italy) Roberto Ravaglia	BMW 318i	15	+10.717	38	6
16	22	(France) Yannick Dalmas	Peugeot 405	15	+10.960	6	5
17	26	(United Kingdom) John Cleland	Vauxhall Cavalier	15	+12.574	4	4
18	11	(Germany) Frank Biela	Audi 80 Quattro	15	+13.621	19	3
19	31	(United Kingdom) Andy Rouse	Ford Mondeo	15	+15.923s	Ret	2
20	15	(Germany) Hans Joachim Stuck	Audi 80 Quattro	15	+16.234	21	1
21	20	(France) Alain Cudini	Opel Vectra	15	+16.359	2	
22	24	(France) Marc Sourd	Audi 80 Quattro	15	+16.412	20	
23	3	(Belgium) Eric Bachelart	Peugeot 405	15	+17.129	Ret	
24	43	(Sweden) Per-Gunnar Andersson	BMW 318i	15	+18.437	32	
25	9	(Switzerland) Bernard Thuner	Peugeot 405	15	+19.666	27	
26	45	(Venezuela) Johnny Cecotto	BMW 318i	14	+1 lap	13	
27	34	(Italy) Fabrizio Giovanardi	Peugeot 405	14	+1 lap	15	
28	2	(Australia) Mark Skaife	Nissan Primera	14	+1 lap	33	
29	30	(United Kingdom) Kieth O'Dor	Nissan Primera	14	+1 lap	31	
30	28	(United Kingdom) Will Hoy	Toyota Carina	14	+1 Lap	17	
31	17	(France) Laurent Aiello	BMW 318i	9	+6 laps	Ret	
32	7	(Belgium) Thierry Tassin	BMW 318i	9	+6 laps	6	
Ret	37	(Italy) Alessandro Nannini	Alfa Romeo 155	1	+15 laps	5	
Ret	29	(United Kingdom) David Leslie	Vauxhall Cavalier	1	+15 laps	36	
Ret	43	(South Africa) Deon Joubert	BMW 318i	1	+15 laps	39	
Ret	14	(Germany) Franz Engstler	Alfa Romeo 155	1	+15 laps	14	
Ret	16	(Germany) Joachim Winkelhock	BMW 318i	1	+15 laps	7	
Ret	27	(United Kingdom) Robb Gravett	Peugeot 405	1	+15 laps	8	
Ret	25	(United Kingdom) Julian Bailey	Toyota Carina	1	+15 laps	9	
Ret	42	(Portugal) Ni Amorim	Opel Astra	1	+15 laps	28	
Ret	18	(France) Paul Belmondo	Opel Vectra	1	+15 laps	30	
Ret	44	(Sweden) Slim Borgudd	Mazda Xedos 6	1	+15 laps	23	
DNS	32	(United Kingdom) Steve Soper	BMW 318i			Ret	

=== Drivers' standings ===
Scoring system

Points system
**1st**	**2nd**	**3rd**	**4th**	**5th**	**6th**	**7th**	**8th**	**9th**	**10th**	**11th**	**12th**	**13th**	**14th**	**15th**	**16th**	**17th**	**18th**	**19th**	**20th**
40	30	24	20	16	15	14	13	12	11	10	9	8	7	6	5	4	3	2	1

Pos	Driver	Race 1	Race 2	Pts
1	(New Zealand) Paul Radisich	**1**	**1**	80
2	(Italy) Nicola Larini	3	2	54
3	(France) Philippe Gache	12	3	33
4	(France) Alain Cudini	2	21	30
5	(Germany) Alexander Burgstaller	11	4	30
6	(United Kingdom) John Cleland	4	17	24
7	(France) Christophe Bouchut	10	9	23
8	(France) Yannick Dalmas	6	16	20
9	(Belgium) Eric van de Poele	18	5	19
10	(France) Jean-Pierre Malcher	16	8	18
11	(Italy) Alessandro Nannini	5	Ret	16
12	(Italy) Emanuele Pirro	35	6	15
13	(Italy) Stefano Modena	26	7	14
14	(Germany) Joachim Winkelhock	7	Ret	14
15	(United Kingdom) Robb Gravett	8	Ret	13
16	(United Kingdom) Julian Bailey	9	Ret	12
17	(Italy) Gabriele Tarquini	22	10	11
18	(Germany) Christian Danner	37	11	10
19	(Belgium) Marc Duez	24	12	9
20	(Italy) Ivan Capelli	25	13	8
21	(Venezuela) Johnny Cecotto	13	26	8
22	(Australia) Tony Longhurst	29	14	7
23	(Germany) Franz Engstler	14	Ret	7
24	(Italy) Roberto Ravaglia	38	15	6
25	(Italy) Fabrizio Giovanardi	15	27	6
26	(Germany) Frank Biela	19	18	5
27	(United Kingdom) Will Hoy	17	30	4
28	(United Kingdom) Andy Rouse	Ret	19	2
29	(Germany) Hans-Joachim Stuck	21	20	1
30	(France) Marc Sourd	20	22	1
31	(Sweden) Slim Borgudd	23	Ret	
32	(Belgium) Éric Bachelart	Ret	23	
33	(Sweden) Per-Gunnar Andersson	32	24	
34	(Switzerland) Bernard Thuner	27	25	
35	(Australia) Mark Skaife	33	28	
36	(Portugal) Ni Amorim	28	Ret	
37	(United Kingdom) Kieth O'Dor	31	29	
38	(France) Paul Belmondo	30	Ret	
39	(France) Laurent Aïello	Ret	31	
40	(Belgium) Thierry Tassin	34	32	
41	(United Kingdom) David Leslie	36	Ret	
42	(South Africa) Deon Joubert	39	Ret	
	(United Kingdom) Steve Soper	Ret	DNS	

Colour	Result
Gold	Winner
Silver	Second place
Bronze	Third place
Green	Points classification
Blue	Non-points classification
Blue	Non-classified finish (NC)
Purple	Retired, not classified (Ret)
Red	Did not qualify (DNQ)
Red	Did not pre-qualify (DNPQ)
Black	Disqualified (DSQ)
White	Did not start (DNS)
White	Withdrew (WD)
White	Race cancelled (C)
Blank	Did not practice (DNP)
Blank	Did not arrive (DNA)
Blank	Excluded (EX)

**Bold** – Pole
Italics – Fastest Lap

=== Nations' standings ===
Pos	Nation	Points
1	Italy	86
2	France	86
3	New Zealand	80
4	Germany	64
5	Belgium	28
6	(United Kingdom) Great Britain	15
7	Venezuela	8
8	Australia	7

- Each nation nominated up to 5 point-scoring drivers.
