= Alfa Romeo 155 =

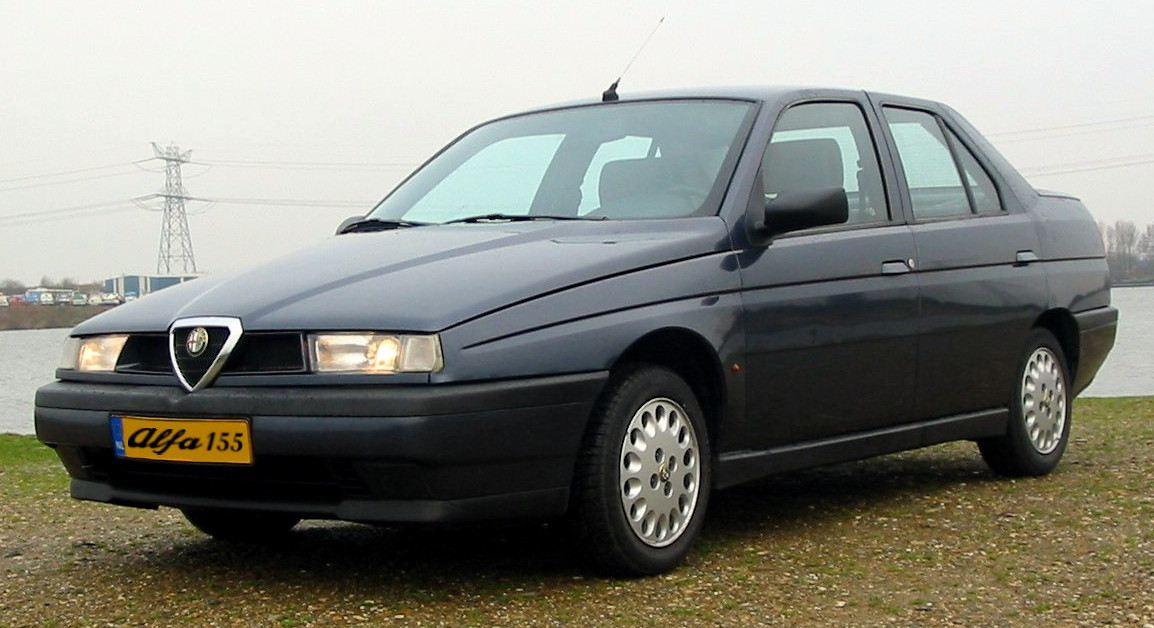

Overview
- Manufacturer: Alfa Romeo
- Production: 1992–1998; 195,526 produced
- Assembly: Italy: Pomigliano d'Arco plant, Campania
- Designer: Ercole Spada at I.DE.A Institute

Body and chassis
- Class: Compact executive car (D)
- Body style: 4-door saloon
- Layout: Front-engine, front-wheel-drive / four-wheel-drive
- Platform: Type Three (Tipo Tre)
- Related: Fiat Tempra; Lancia Dedra

Powertrain
- Engine: Petrol: 1.6 L Twin Spark 16V I4; 1.7 L Twin Spark 8V I4; 1.8 L Twin Spark 8V/16V I4; 2.0 L Twin Spark 8V/16V I4; 2.0 L Fiat Twin Cam 16V turbo I4; 2.5 L Busso 12V V6; Diesel: 2.0 L TD I4; 2.5 L VM Motori 425 OHV OHV TD I4

Dimensions
- Wheelbase: 2,540 mm (100.0 in)
- Length: 4,443 mm (174.9 in)
- Width: 1,700–1,730 mm (66.9–68.1 in)
- Height: 1,440 mm (56.7 in)
- Curb weight: 1,195–1,430 kg (2,635–3,153 lb)

Chronology
- Predecessor: Alfa Romeo 75
- Successor: Alfa Romeo 156

The Alfa Romeo 155 (Type 167) is a compact executive car produced by Italian automobile manufacturer Alfa Romeo between 1992 and 1998. It was unveiled in January 1992 at Barcelona, with the first public launch in March 1992, at the Geneva Motor Show. A total of 195,526 units were made before it was replaced by the 156.

== Design ==
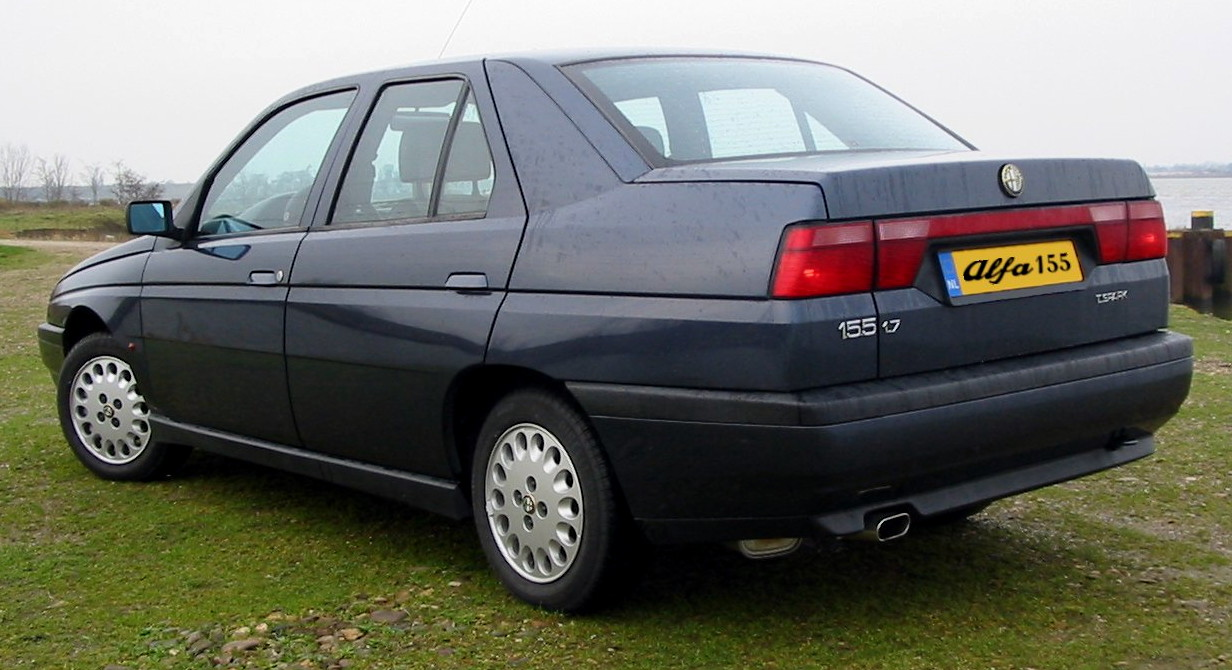
Rear view

Developed to replace the 75 and based on the parent company Fiat Group's Tipo Tre platform, the 155 was somewhat larger in dimension than the 75 and had evolved styling from that of its predecessor. The 155 was designed by Italian design house I.DE.A Institute. An exceptional drag coefficient of 0.29 was achieved with the body design. The boxy design of the 155 allowed for a big boot space of 525 L (115 imp gal; 139 US gal).

The most significant technical change from the 75 was the switch to a front-wheel drive layout. A four-wheel-drive model called the 155 Q4 was also available, which had a 2.0-litre (120 in^{3}) turbocharged engine and a permanent four-wheel drive powertrain, both derived from the Lancia Delta Integrale; it was essentially considered to be a Lancia Delta Integrale with a different body.

The new model came in "Sport" and "Super" trims. The Sport had a slightly lowered ride height and more aggressive dampers while the Super had the option of wood trim and electronically controlled dampers and seat controls.

The reception of the 155 was generally lukewarm. The 75 had been conceived prior to Fiat's acquisition of Alfa Romeo, so as the last automobile independently developed by Alfa Romeo made it cast a shadow over the 155; the loss of rear-wheel drive was frequently cited as the main cause of disappointment. Nevertheless, the 155 was entered in Touring Car racing and was very successful in every major championship it entered, which gradually improved its image.

The 155 received a facelift in 1995 and changes included a wider body as well as a wider track and revised steering based on Alfa Romeo's racing experience. The facelift also brought in new 16 valve engines for the 1.8 and 2.0 litre models, whilst retaining the 2.5 litre V6 and making some improvements to cabin materials and build quality.

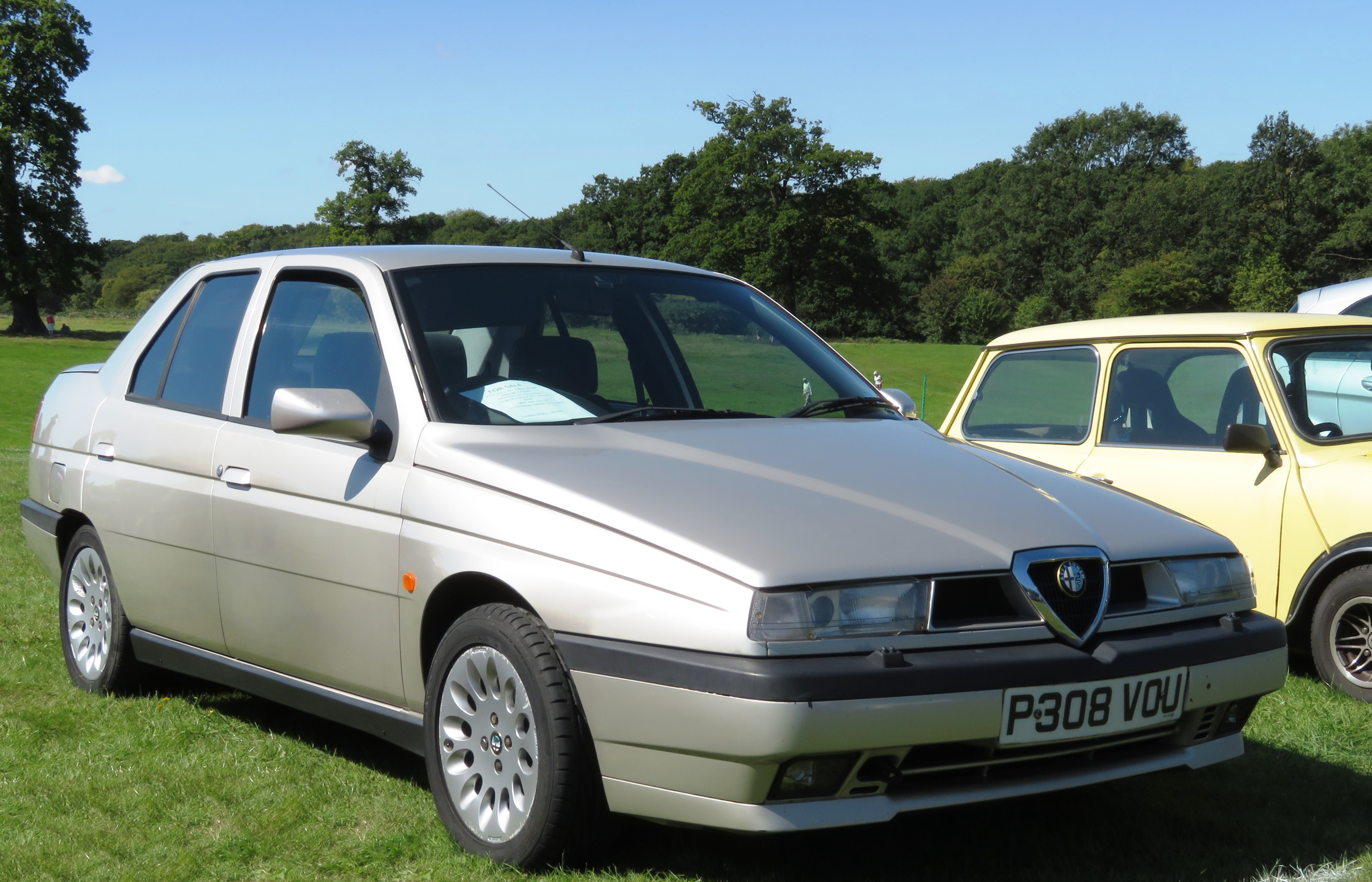
Alfa Romeo 155 (Post-facelift)

There were several Sport Packs available, including a race inspired body kit (spoiler and side skirts) and black or graphite coloured 16-inch Speedline wheels. The luxury oriented Super trim came with wood inserts in the cabin and silver-painted alloy wheels.

The 155 was never produced in the Sportwagon bodystyle (Alfa Romeo's term for an estate or station wagon), but Sbarro made a proposal for such a model in 1994 which was not put into production.

Production of the 155 ceased in 1998, when it was replaced by the 156.

== Timeline ==
- 1992 – 155 launched
- 1993 – Grille design changed from “flushed” to “recessed”
- 1994 – 155 1.8 T.Spark Silverstone introduced to the British market, 155 Q4 and turbodiesel to some markets
- 1995 – New "widebody" series 2 155 launched with wider track and quick rack steering wheel; initially only available with 2.0 L 16v engine
- June 1996 – Widebody design becomes available with 1.6 L 16v and 1.8 L 16v engines
- 1998 – Production ends

Alfa Romeo 155 production
| Model | Units |
|---|---|
| 155 1.6 | 8,333 |
| 155 1.7 | 36,359 |
| 155 1.8 | 67,774 |
| 155 1.8 Silverstone/Formula | 2,500 |
| 155 1.8 8v Sport | 2,500 |
| 155 2.0 | 38,719 |
| 155 2.0 8v S.S.Elegante | 2,500 |
| 155 2.5 | 7,198 |
| 155 2.0 TD | 15,652 |
| 155 2.0 Q4 | 2,591 |
| 155 2.0 Q4 (1995/1997) | 110 |
| 155 2.5 TD | 11,290 |
| Total | 195,526 |

== Specifications and special editions ==
The 155 was initially available with 1.7 L Twin Spark, 1.8 L Twin Spark, and 2.0 L Twin Spark petrol engines, the latter two were equipped with variable valve timing. The 1.7 L was not sold in the United Kingdom.

Two four cylinder turbocharged diesel engines, a Fiat derived 1.9 L (92 PS (68 kW; 91 hp)) and a VM Motori 2.5 L (125 PS (92 kW; 123 hp)) were available in some markets, except for the United Kingdom.

At the top of the 155 range were the 2.5 L V6, using a 166 PS (122 kW; 164 hp) engine derived from the 3.0 L V6 used in the larger 164, and the Q4 which used a drivetrain derived from the Lancia Delta Integrale which meant a 190 PS (140 kW; 190 hp) 2.0 L 16V turbocharged engine and permanent four-wheel drive.

The Q4 also incorporated three differential gears (normal at the front, epicyclic at the centre (including a Ferguson viscous coupling) and Torsen self-locking at the rear). Both the 2.5 V6 and Q4 models were also available with electronically adjustable suspension with two damper settings (automatic and sport).

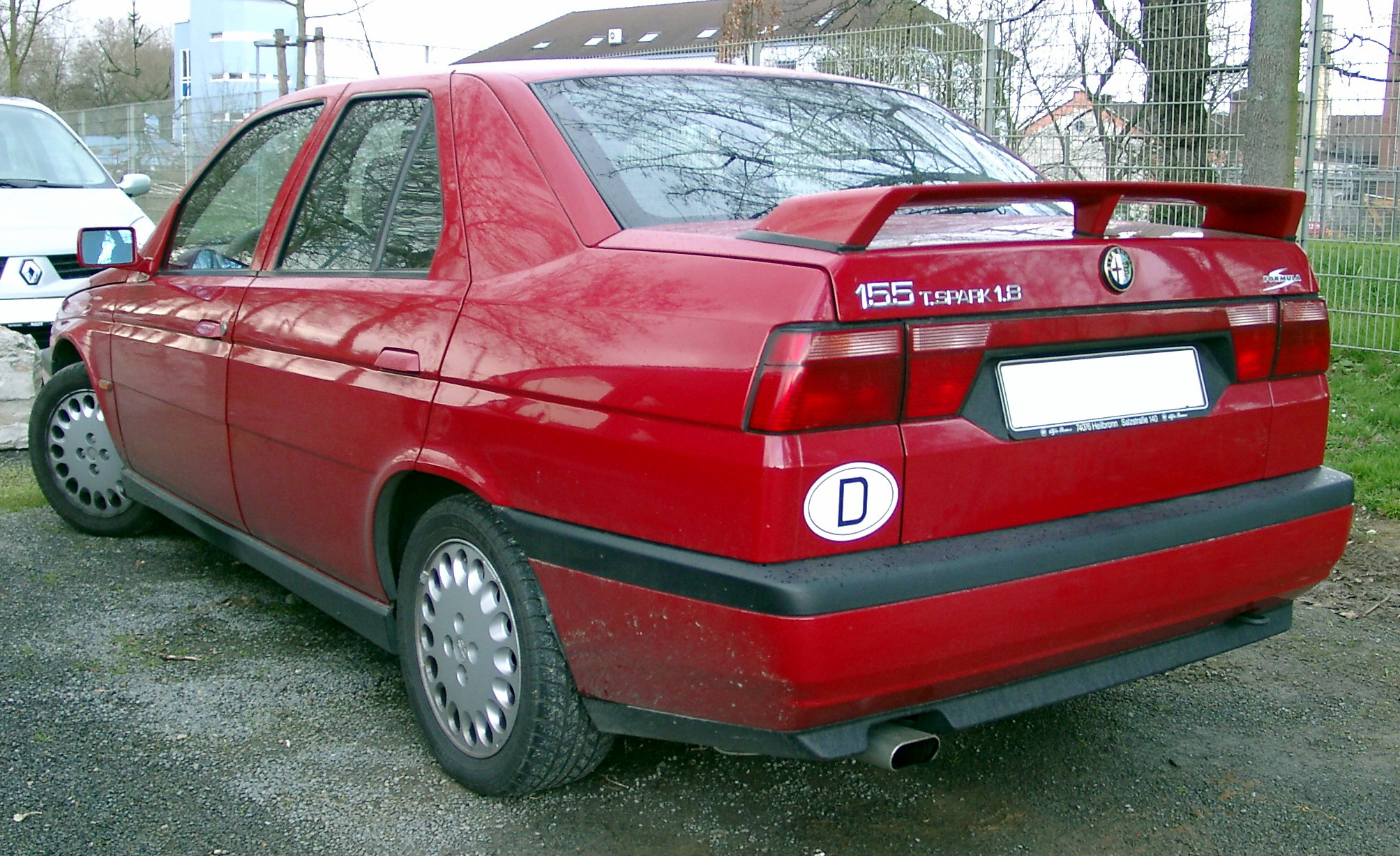
155 Formula

The most notable special edition was the "Silverstone" edition released in the United Kingdom which was known as the "Formula" in Europe: this was intended to homologate an aero pack for Alfa Romeo in the British Touring Car Championship race series. The pack was included in the boot as bolt on aero kit, consisting of an adjustable rear spoiler and extendable front air splitter. These changes caused controversy during the 1994 BTCC as it was seen as an unfair advantage by the other teams and after missing 1 race, Alfa Romeo were forced to run with aero in its lowest downforce form to finish the championship.

The Silverstone was a lighter but no more powerful version of the 1.8 L, even though the race car it was homologating had a 2.0 L engine. This anomaly came about because the 1.8 L engine block, with its narrower bore, allowed Alfa Romeo to use a longer stroke on the racing car and stay within the 2.0 L capacity limit.

The Silverstone was only available in either Alfa red or Black paintwork with plain, unpainted bumpers.

== Facelift ==
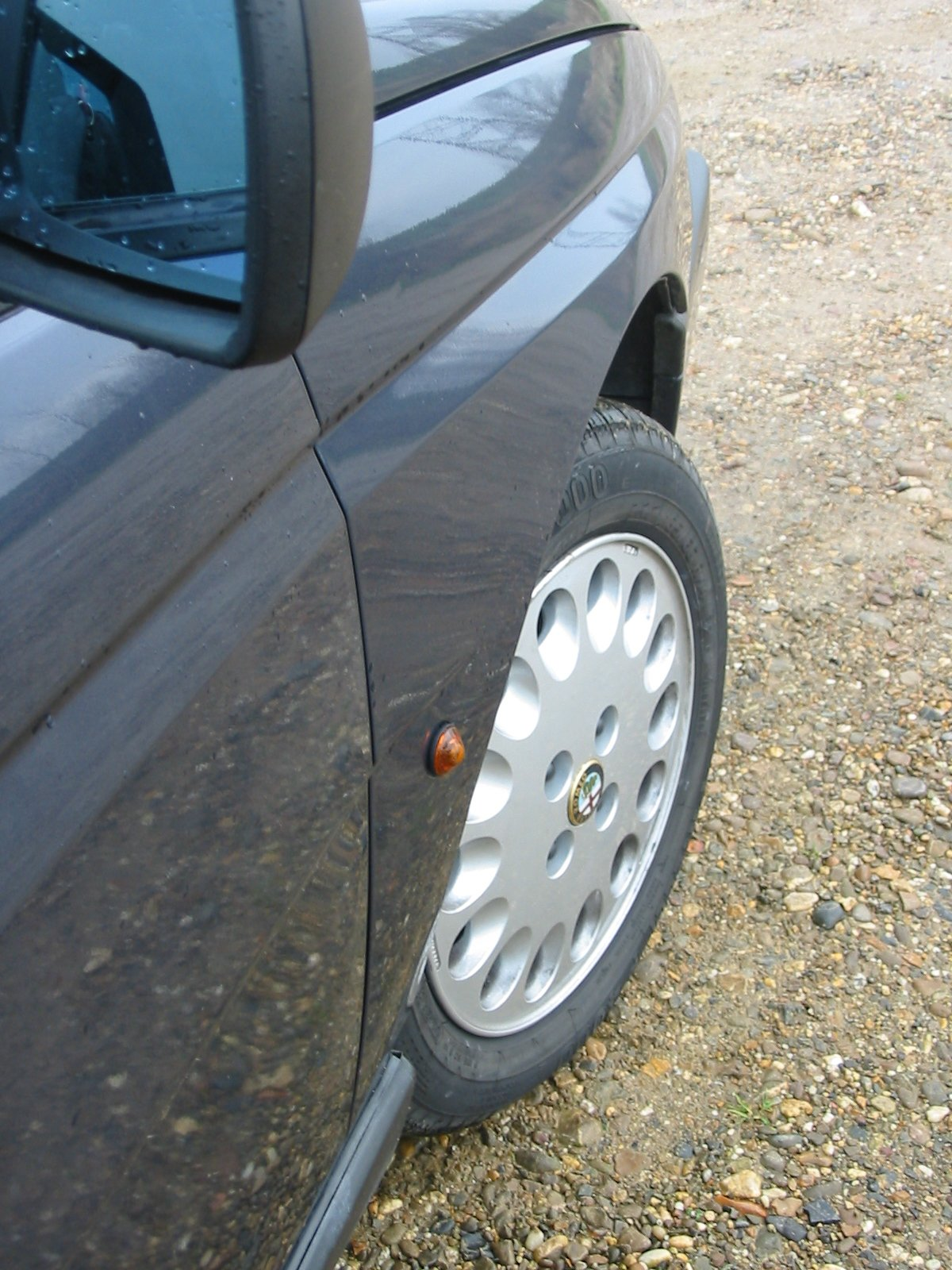
Enlarged wheel arches after 1995

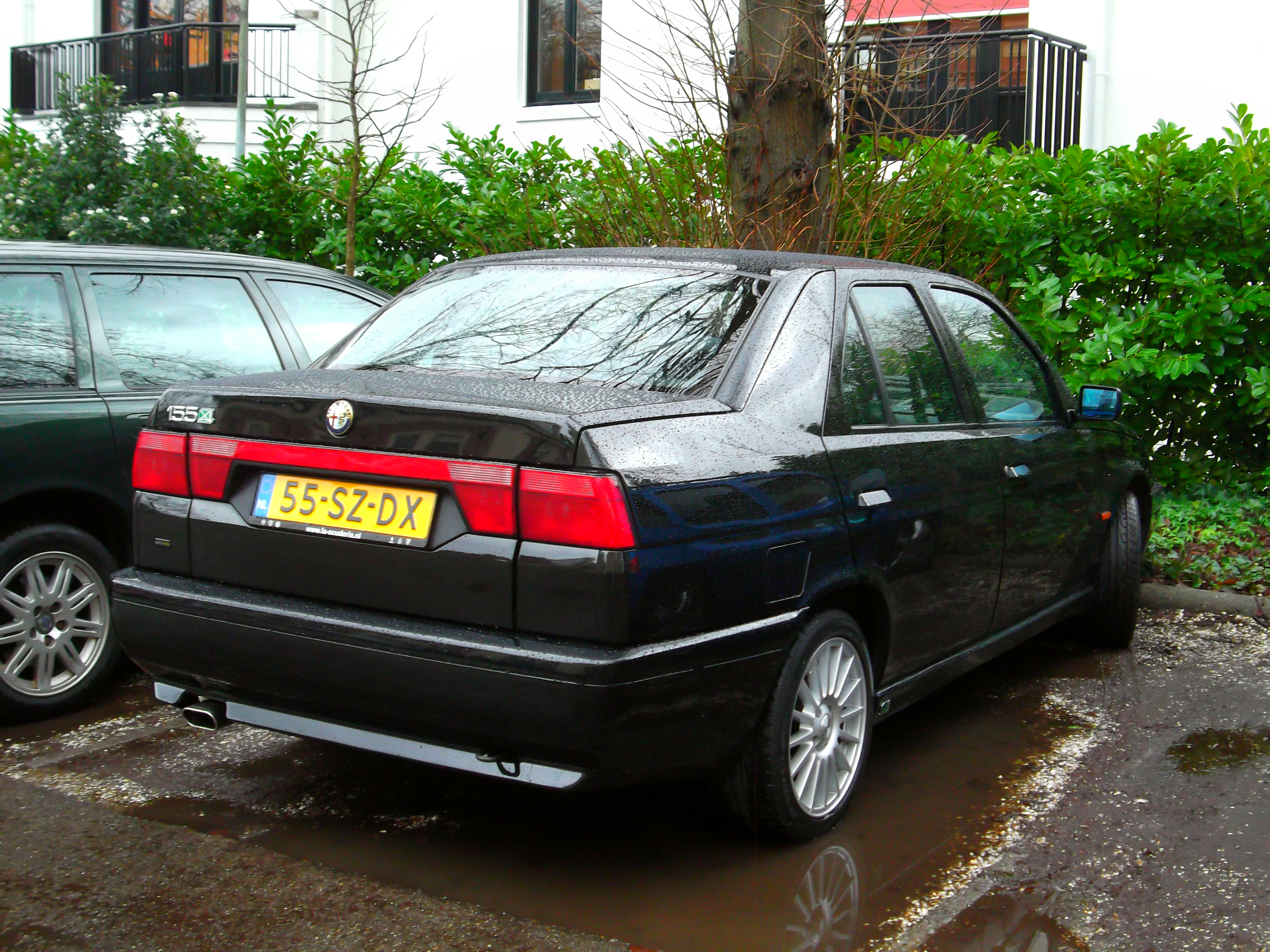
The Q4 version was the top of range model, fitted with 2 litre turbocharged inline-four engine and four-wheel drive system. The powertrain was borrowed from the Lancia Delta Integrale.

In 1995, the 155 was given an extensive revamp, resulting in wider front and rear tracks with subtle enlargement to the wheel arches to accommodate the changes underneath.

The revised car also received a quicker steering rack, with 2.2 turns lock-to-lock (initially only on the 2.0 litre model, but later followed by the 1.8 litre). The four-cylinder cars retained the twin spark ignition system but received the Alfa Romeo designed 16-valve cylinder heads with belt driven camshafts, still based on engine blocks of Fiat design. They replaced the elderly 8 valve, chain driven camshaft motors of the earlier models.

The 2.5 L V6 engine continued in wide body form (but without the steering changes) while the Q4 was discontinued. In Europe, the 1.7 L Twin Spark was replaced by a 1.6 L 16 valve Twin Spark. Some 8 valve engines continued in series 2 cars in some markets. The wide bodied cars also received revised interiors and equipment specifications to keep the cars competitive in the market.

The wide body ("Series 2") 155s can be distinguished from their earlier counterparts by their flared front and smooth rear wheel arches (the latter replacing the lip round the wheel arch of the original). They also sported round or oblong indicator side-repeaters and had their model badges moved below the rear lights rather than having them above.

== Engines ==
| Model | Type | Family | Displacement | Power | Torque | 0–100 km/h 0–62 mph (seconds) | Top speed | Note |
Petrol engines
| 1.7 8V | I4 | Alfa Twin Spark | 1,749 cc (106.7 cu in) | 115 PS (85 kW; 113 hp) at 6,000 rpm | 146 N⋅m (108 lb⋅ft) at 3,500 rpm | 10.6 | 191 km/h (119 mph) | |
| 1.8 8V | I4 | Alfa Twin Spark | 1,773 cc (108.2 cu in) | 129 PS (95 kW; 127 hp) at 6,000 rpm | 165 N⋅m (122 lb⋅ft) at 5,000 rpm | 10.3 | 200 km/h (124 mph) | |
| 2.0 8V | I4 | Alfa Twin Spark | 1,995 cc (121.7 cu in) | 143 PS (105 kW; 141 hp) at 6,000 rpm | 187 N⋅m (138 lb⋅ft) at 5,000 rpm | 9.3 | 205 km/h (127 mph) | |
| 2.5 V6 | V6 | Alfa 'Busso' V6 | 2,492 cc (152.1 cu in) | 166 PS (122 kW; 164 hp) at 5,800 rpm | 216 N⋅m (159 lb⋅ft) at 4,500 rpm | 8.4 | 215 km/h (134 mph) | |
| Q4 | I4 | Fiat Twin Cam | 1,995 cc (121.7 cu in) | 190 PS (140 kW; 187 hp) at 6,000 rpm | 291 N⋅m (215 lb⋅ft) at 2,500 rpm | 7.0 | 225 km/h (140 mph) | |
| 1.6 16V | I4 | Alfa Twin Spark | 1,598 cc (97.5 cu in) | 120 PS (88 kW; 118 hp) at 6,300 rpm | 144 N⋅m (106 lb⋅ft) at 4,500 rpm | 11.4 | 195 km/h (121 mph) | since 1995 |
| 1.8 16V | I4 | Alfa Twin Spark | 1,747 cc (106.6 cu in) | 140 PS (103 kW; 138 hp) at 6,300 rpm | 165 N⋅m (122 lb⋅ft) at 4,000 rpm | 10.0 | 205 km/h (127 mph) | since 1995 |
| 2.0 16V | I4 | Alfa Twin Spark | 1,970 cc (120 cu in) | 150 PS (110 kW; 148 hp) at 6,200 rpm | 187 N⋅m (138 lb⋅ft) at 4,000 rpm | 9.0 | 210 km/h (130 mph) | since 1995 |
Diesel engines
| 2.0 TD | I4 | | 1,929 cc (117.7 cu in) | 90 PS (66 kW; 89 hp) at 4,100 rpm | 186 N⋅m (137 lb⋅ft) at 2,500 rpm | 13.5 | 180 km/h (112 mph) | |
| 2.5 TD | I4 | | 2,500 cc (150 cu in) | 125 PS (92 kW; 123 hp) at 4,200 rpm | 294 N⋅m (217 lb⋅ft) at 2,000 rpm | 10.4 | 195 km/h (121 mph) | |

== 155 GTA Stradale ==
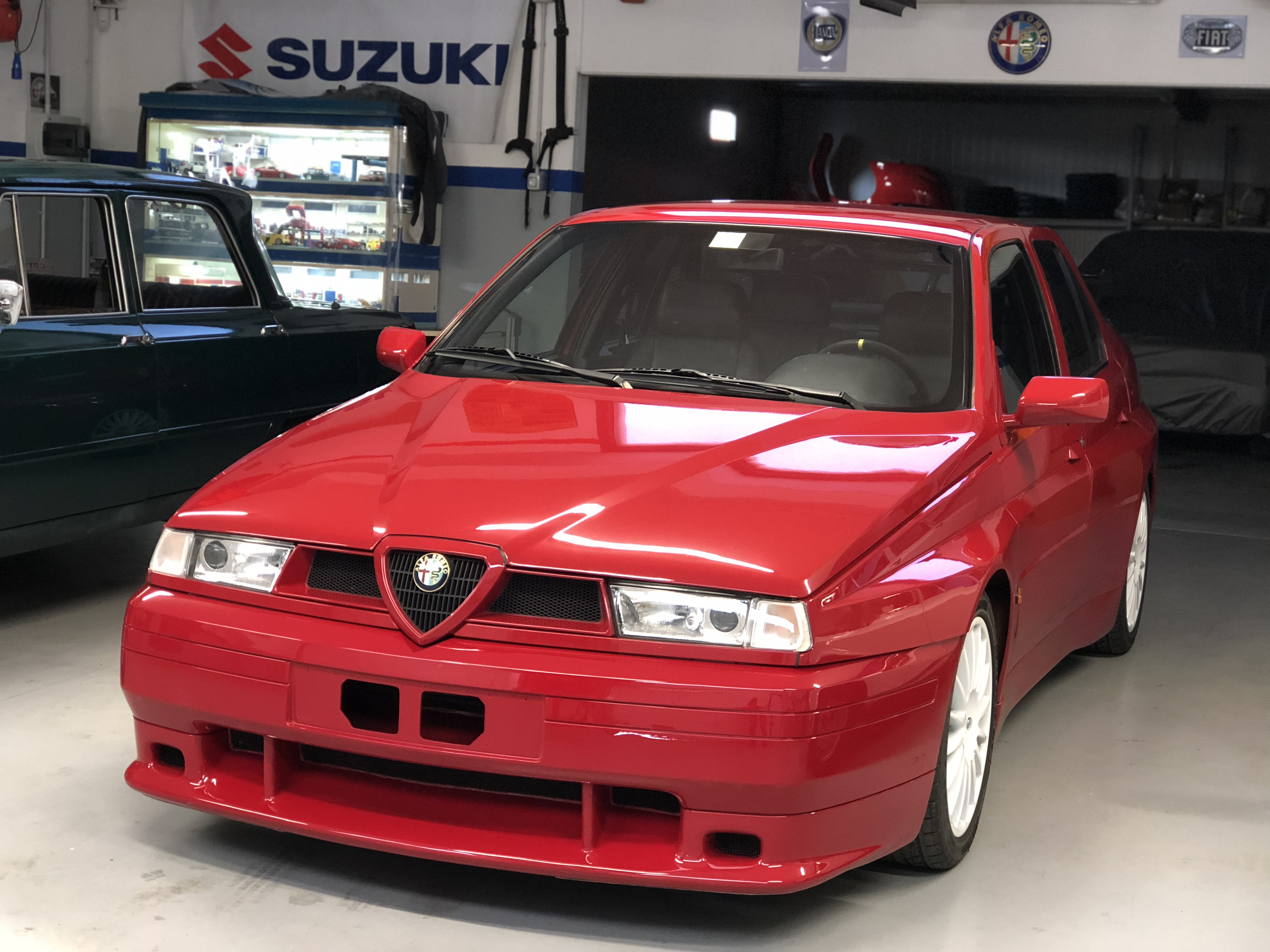
155 GTA Stradale

In 1992, Alfa Romeo on the wake of the wins obtained by the 155 GTA in the Italian CIVT championship, decided to start the production of a "Stradale" version to be manufactured at the Abarth workshop. The car was displayed at Bologna Motor Show and being used at Monza GP d'Italia as safety car.

Designed by Abarth engineer Sergio Limone, the Stradale used the 155 Q4 as a base using its drivetrain and four-wheel drive system. The interior was stripped of some creature comforts and the car was fitted with a race inspired body kit with a large rear spoiler. Only one unit was made before the project was abandoned due to high manufacturing costs.

== 155 TI.Z and GTAZ ==
External image
- 155 TI.Z

Two special editions of the 155 were made by Zagato. In 1993, the 155 TI.Z was introduced, followed by the 155 GTAZ in 1995. Both models had more muscular looking exterior and increased power than the standard 155, the TI.Z had the 170 PS (125 kW; 168 hp) Twin Spark engine and GTAZ had the 155 Q4's turbocharged two litre engine now rated at 215 PS (158 kW; 212 hp). Both models were built only in limited numbers and many of the cars were sent to Japan.

== Motorsport ==
The 155 was very successful in touring car racing, using the Supertouring-homologated GTA and the V6 TI for the DTM. Between 1992 and 1994, the 155 managed to take the Italian Superturismo Championship, the German DTM championship (both with Nicola Larini at the wheel), the Spanish Touring Car Championship (with Adrián Campos), and the British Touring Car Championship (with Gabriele Tarquini).

The 155 remained competitive until it was replaced with the 156, finishing third in the DTM (then known as the International Touring Car Championship, or ITC) in 1996 with Alessandro Nannini and winning the Spanish championship again in 1997 with Fabrizio Giovanardi. In 1993, Larini in an Alfa 155 placed second in the FIA Touring Car Challenge behind Paul Radisich in a Ford Mondeo. The 156 was to continue the high standard set by the 155, winning the European Touring Car Championship multiple times.

=== 155 V6 TI ===
1993 Alfa Romeo 155 DTM

The Alfa Romeo 155 V6 TI was a FIA Class 1 touring car that Alfa Corse raced from 1993 to 1996 in the Deutsche Tourenwagen Meisterschaft and the subsequent International Touring Car Championship. A naturally-aspirated high-revving 2.5 L 60° V6 engine was coupled to a four wheel drive system, rated at 426 PS (313 kW; 420 hp) at 11,500 rpm.

Alfa Corse entered two 155 V6 TIs for works drivers Alessandro Nannini and Nicola Larini; the 1993 season was dominated by Larini winning 11 of 22 races.

In 1994, the rivals from Mercedes seemed to have the advantage, but Alfa did manage to win a further eleven races. A more consistent performance from the Germans gave them the title. Since the 1995 season, the team got new sponsorship livery from Martini Racing.

The 1996 version had a 2.5 L naturally-aspirated type 690 90° V6 engine based on the PRV engine rated at 490 PS (360 kW; 483 hp) at 11,900 rpm. The car has a top speed of around 300 km/h (190 mph) and weighed 1,060 kilograms (2,340 lb).

The Alfa 155 V6 TI has a record of 38 wins (plus 3 other non championship races). The victories were obtained by seven different drivers: 17 (+1) Nicola Larini, 13 (+1) Alessandro Nannini, 2 Stefano Modena, 2 (+1) Christian Danner, 2 Michael Bartels, 1 Kris Nissen, and 1 Gabriele Tarquini.

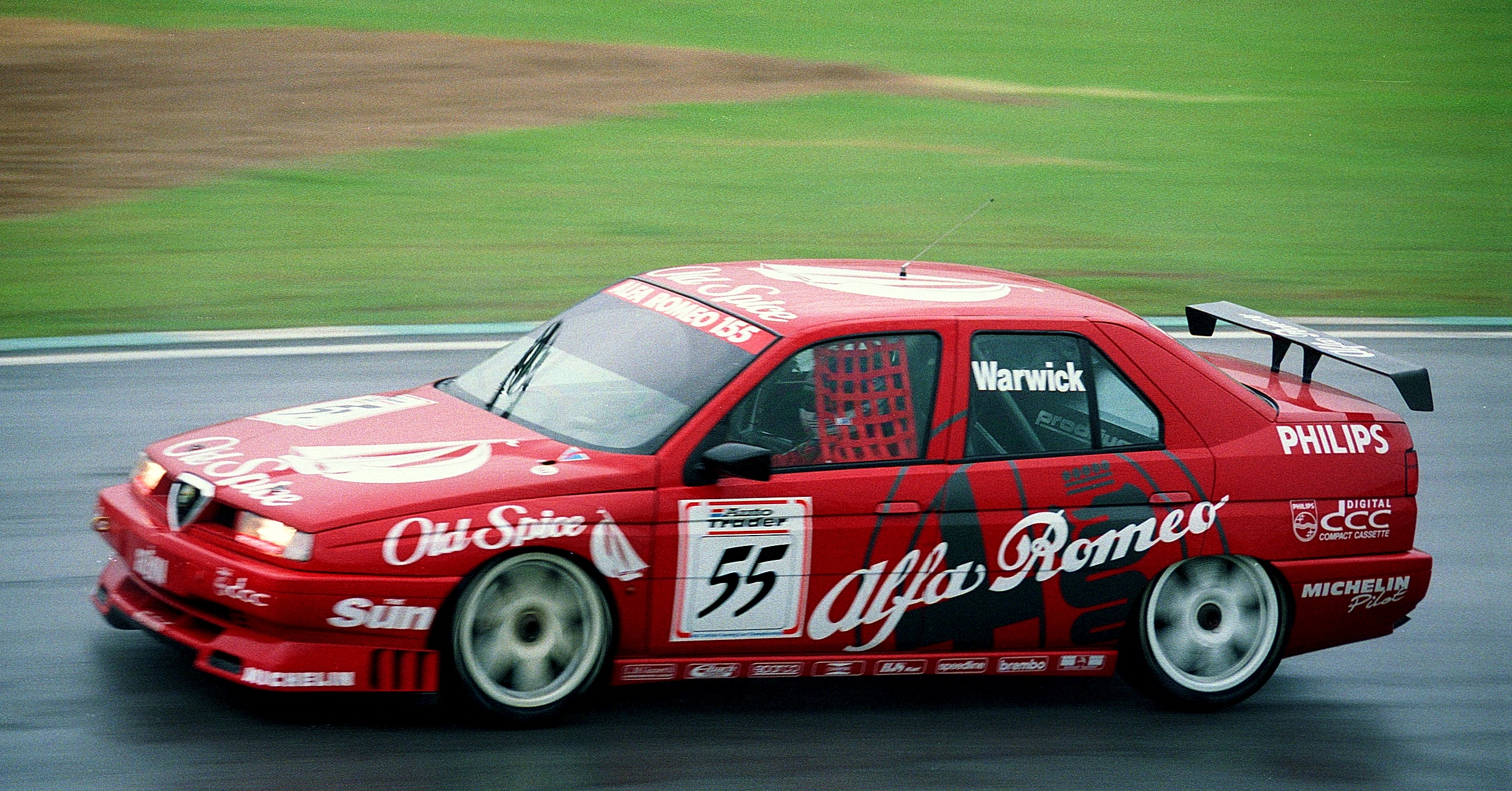
The 155 2.0 TS of Derek Warwick at Brands Hatch, 1995

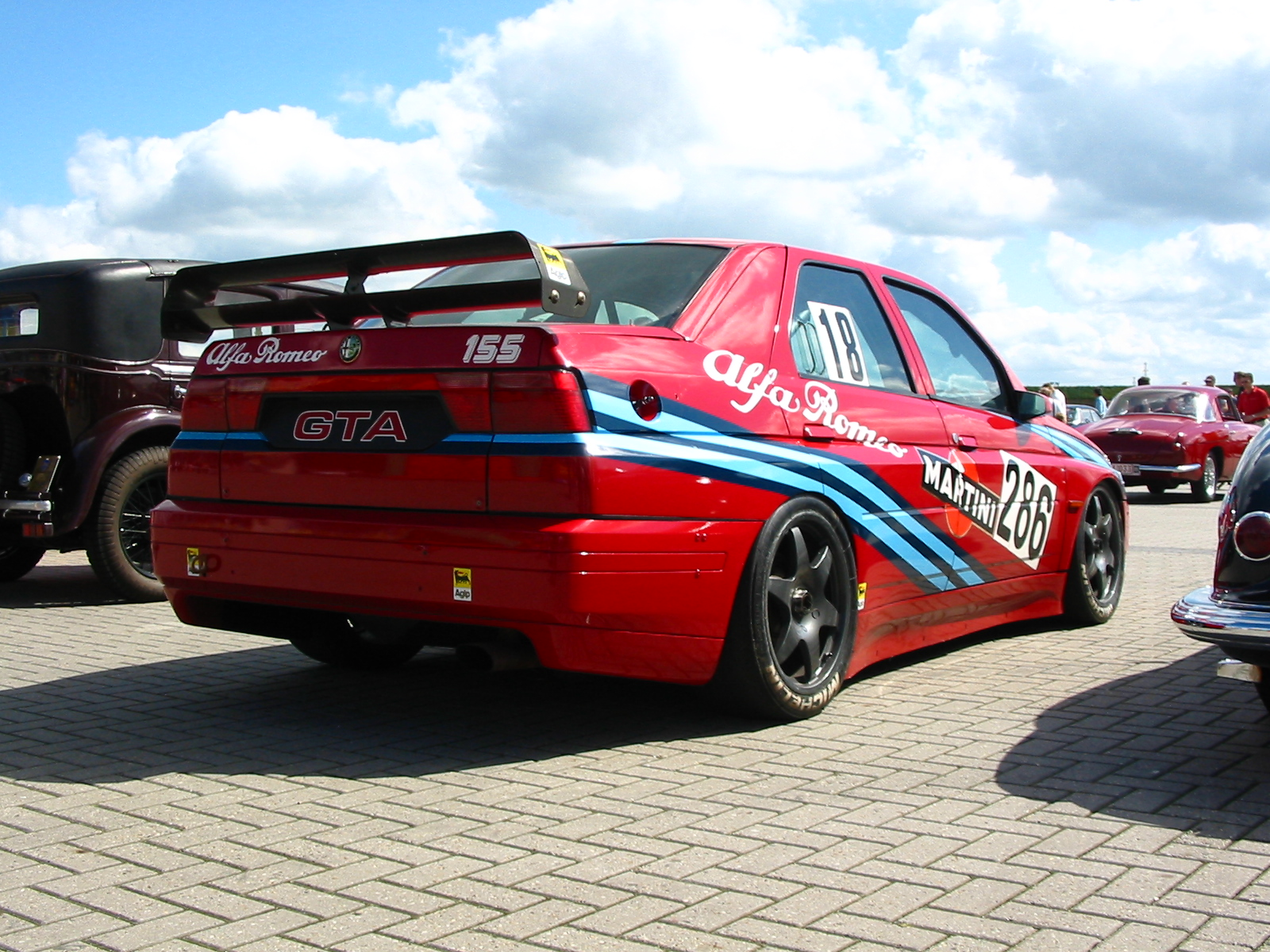
Rear view of Alfa Romeo 155 GTA

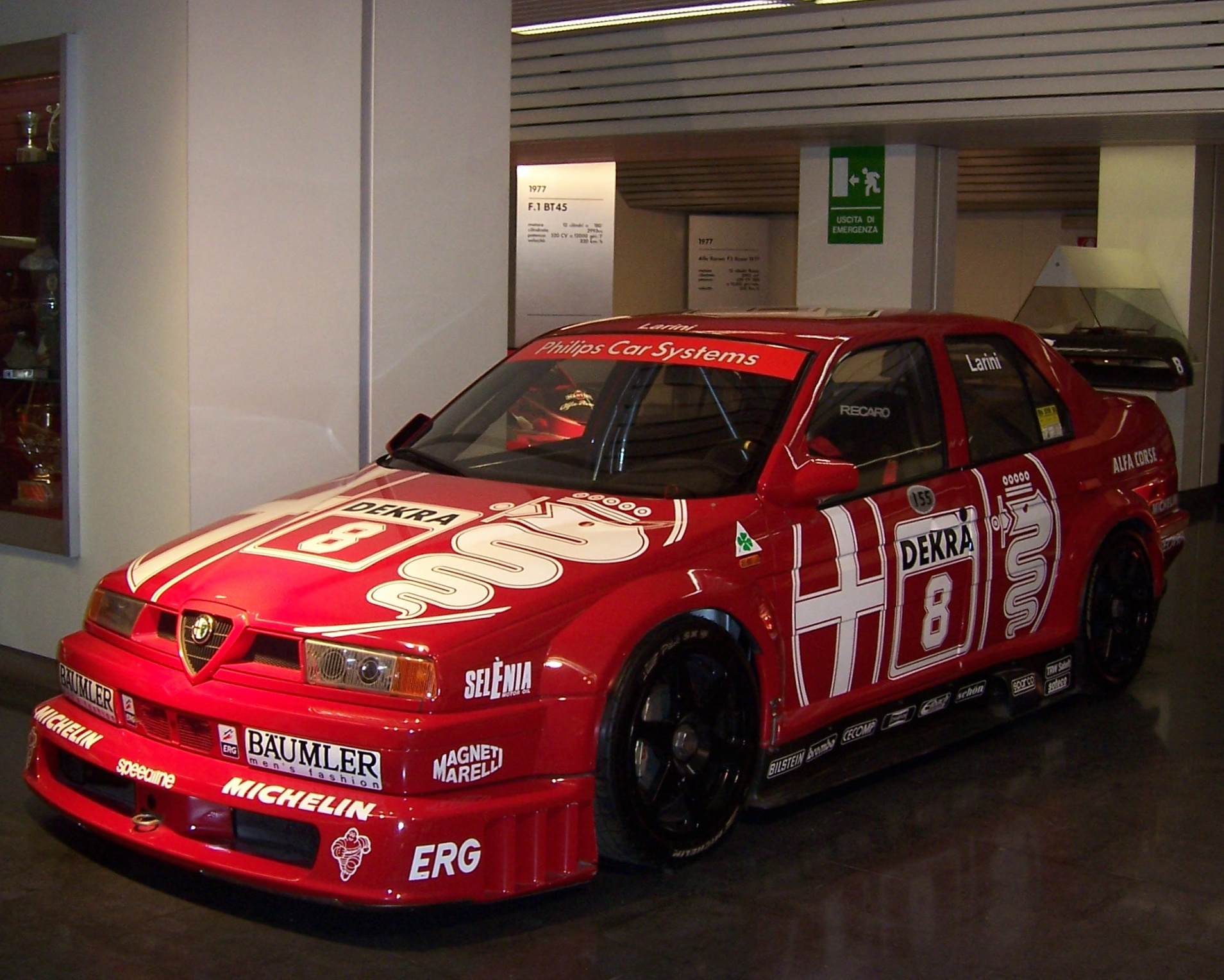
1993 DTM winner car, Nicola Larini's 155 V6 TI.

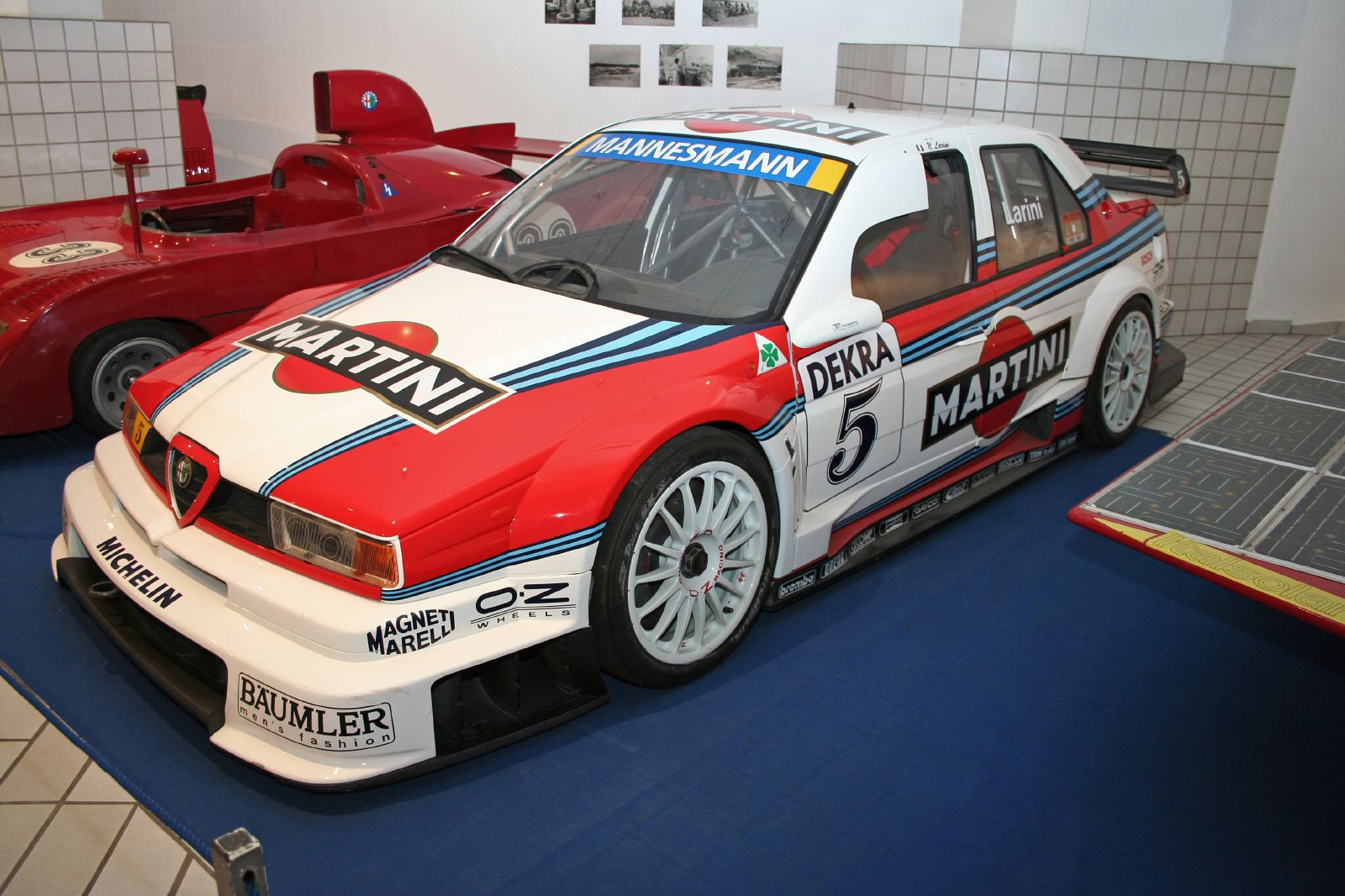
Alfa Romeo 155 V6 TI DTM 1996 in the National Automobile Museum of Turin
