= Alfa Romeo 690 engine =

Overview
- Manufacturer: Alfa Romeo
- Also called: Alfa Romeo 690RC
- Production: 1996

Layout
- Configuration: Naturally aspirated 90° V6
- Displacement: 2.5 L; 152.4 cu in (2,497 cc)
- Cylinder bore: 96.0 mm (3.78 in)
- Piston stroke: 57.5 mm (2.26 in)
- Valvetrain: 24-valve, DOHC, four-valves per cylinder
- Compression ratio: 13:1

RPM range
- Max. engine speed: 12,000 rpm

Combustion
- Fuel system: Fuel injection
- Oil system: Dry sump

Output
- Power output: 373 kW (500 hp) @ 11,875 rpm
- Torque output: 320 N⋅m (236 lb⋅ft) @ 9,500 rpm

Dimensions
- Length: 900 millimetres (35 in)
- Width: 885 millimetres (34.8 in)
- Height: 485 millimetres (19.1 in)
- Dry weight: 85–110 kg (187–243 lb)

The Alfa Romeo 690 engine is a custom-built, production-based, high-revving, prototype, four-stroke, 2.5-liter, naturally aspirated, V6 racing engine, designed, developed and produced by Alfa Romeo, purpose-built for the 1996 ITC season. It was loosely based on the PRV engine, used in the Lancia Thema 6v.

== Applications ==
- 1996 Alfa Romeo 155 V6 TI
