= Belgian Touring Car Series =

Endurance touring car racing series

The Belgian Touring Car Series (BTCS) was an endurance touring car racing series based in Belgium. It was organised by Speedworld and sanctioned by the Royal Automobile Club Belgium. The series was run for only two years, with the last season being in 2011.

== Race format ==
Most meetings consisted of two 90-minute heats, with an additional 12-hour race at Circuit de Spa-Francorchamps. The 2010 calendar featured three races at Spa, three races at Zolder, and one at the French circuit of Dijon-Prenois.

== Cars and classes ==
The series was open to silhouette racing cars, as well as regular touring cars. The Silhoutte classes, S1 and S2, included cars such as the Renault Mégane Trophy, GC Automobile GC-10 V8, Peugeot 406 Silhouette, Peugeot 407 Silhouette, and Volvo S60 BTCS. There were four classes for regular touring cars; T1, T2, T3 and T4. Prizes were available for the winners of each class.

== Champions ==
| Season | Champion |
|---|---|
| 2010 | (Belgium) Frédéric Bouvy |
| 2011 | (Belgium) Philippe Stéveny (Belgium) Didier de Radiguès |
