= Alexander Burgstaller =

Austrian association football player

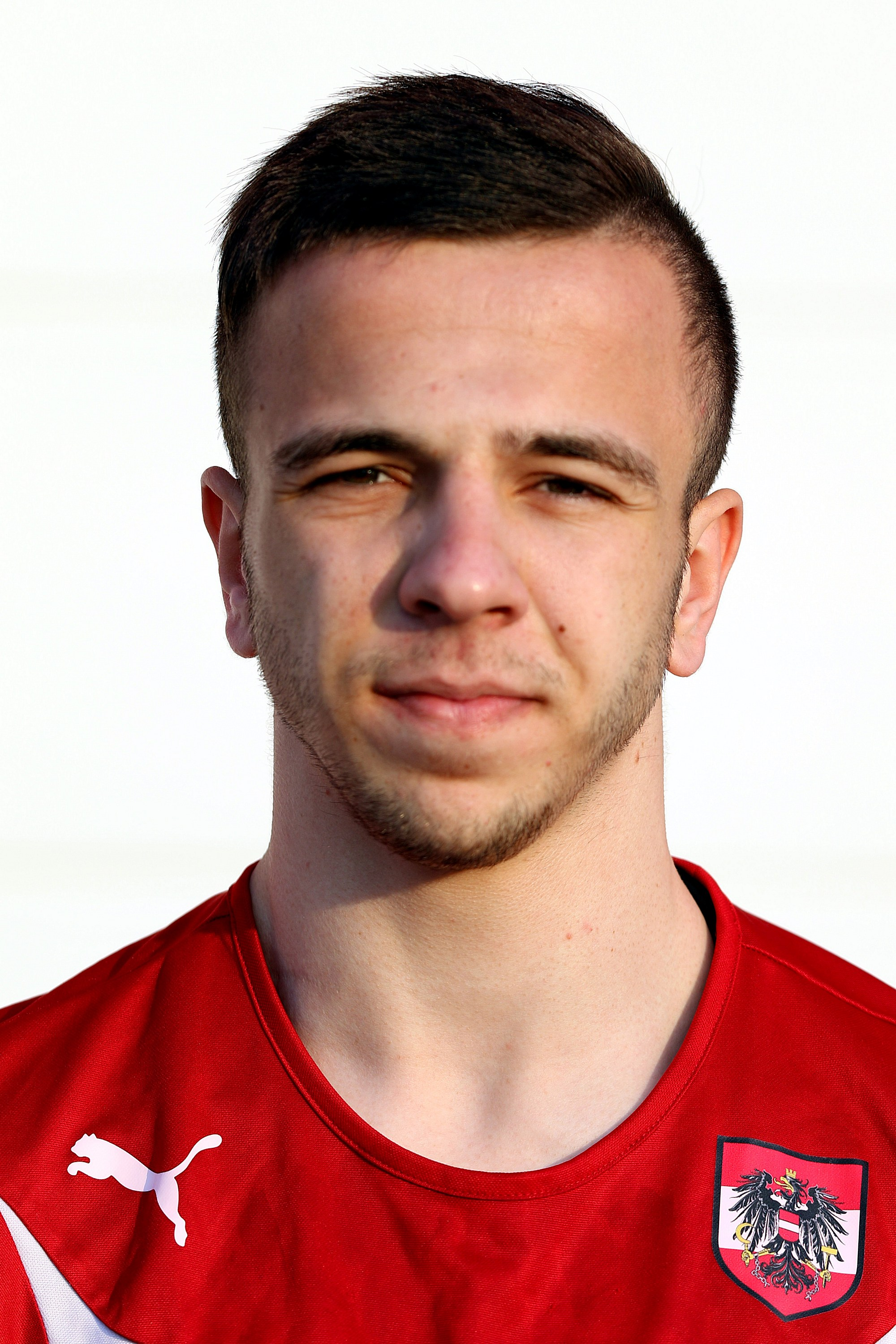

Personal information
- Date of birth: 12 July 1999 (age 27)
- Place of birth: Braunau am Inn, Austria
- Height: 1.77 m (5 ft 10 in)
- Position: Defender

Team information
- Current team: Wacker Innsbruck II
- Number: 47

Youth career
- Red Bull Salzburg

Senior career*
Years	Team	Apps	(Gls)
2017–2019	FC Juniors OÖ	43	(1)
2020	Rapid Wien II	0	(0)
2020–2021	TSV Hartberg	0	(0)
2021–	Wacker Innsbruck II	3	(0)

International career^{‡}
2014	Austria U15	2	(0)
2014–2015	Austria U16	11	(0)
2015–2016	Austria U17	12	(0)
2016–2017	Austria U18	6	(0)
2017–2018	Austria U19	9	(0)
2019	Austria U20	1	(0)
- * Club domestic league appearances and goals as of 14 August 2021 ‡ National team caps and goals as of 23 March 2019

Alexander Burgstaller (born 12 July 1999) is an Austrian footballer who plays as a defender for Wacker Innsbruck II.

== Club career ==
On 31 July 2020, he signed with TSV Hartberg.

On 10 February 2021, he moved to Wacker Innsbruck II.

== International career ==
He played for Austria Under-17 squad at the 2016 UEFA European Under-17 Championship.
