= Dallara 3087 =

Open-wheel formula racing car built by Dallara

- Category: Formula 3000; Formula One
- Constructor: Dallara
- Designers: Giampaolo Dallara (Technical Director); Sergio Rinland (Chief Designer)
- Successor: Dallara F188 (Formula One)

Technical specifications
- Chassis: Carbon Fibre monocoque
- Suspension (front): Pullrod front suspension, double wishbones, inboard coil spring/damper units
- Suspension (rear): Pushrod rear suspension, double wishbones, inboard coil spring/damper units
- Engine: mid-engine, longitudinally mounted, 2,993 cc (182.6 cu in), Ford-Cosworth DFV, 90° V8, NA
- Transmission: Hewland
- Lubricants: Castrol
- Tyres: Avon (F3000); Goodyear (F1)

Competition history
- Notable entrants: Formula 3000: EuroVenturini; Forti Corse; Formula One: BMS Scuderia Italia
- Notable drivers: Formula One: 36. (Italy) Alex Caffi
- Debut: Formula 3000: 1987 BRDC International Trophy; Formula One: 1988 Brazilian Grand Prix
Races	Wins	Poles	F/Laps
22 (F3000); 1 (F1)	0	0	0
- Constructors' Championships: 0
- Drivers' Championships: 0

The Dallara 3087 was a Formula 3000 car, first used in the 1987 International Formula 3000 season, with which the BMS Scuderia Italia team competed in the first race of the 1988 Formula One season. Driven by Alex Caffi, it failed to pass pre-qualifying, with its fastest time being 18 seconds slower than the time set by Ayrton Senna for pole position. The BMS Scuderia Italia team replaced the car for the next race with the Dallara F188, which was specifically designed for Formula One.

== Development ==
Giuseppe Lucchini was an Italian steel tycoon and motorsport enthusiast who had set up a racing team, Scuderia Italia, to participate in the Italian Rally Championship and later the World Touring Car Championship. For 1988, he turned to Formula One and contracted Dallara to build a suitable car, to be designated a Dallara F188, around a 3.5-litre Cosworth DFZ.

Dallara did not have their planned F188 chassis ready for Scuderia Italia to start the 1988 Formula One season. However, in order to fulfil its obligations to participate in the World Championship, a team had to participate in all the season's races. Therefore, for the first race in Brazil, Scuderia Italia brought a chassis designated the 3087. This was Dallara's Formula 3000 car first used in 1987 by two Italian teams, adapted to meet the Formula One regulations. It was equipped with a 3-litre Cosworth DFV engine with the rev limiter removed; all other normally aspirated cars in Formula One had larger 3.5-litre engines. It was driven by Italian Alex Caffi, who had previously driven in Formula One for Osella.

== Race history ==
=== International Formula 3000 ===
As a Formula 3000 car, the car debuted in the 1987 International Formula 3000 Championship season and was used by EuroVenturini and Forti Corse teams, both paired with Cosworth DFV engines. Marco Apicella was the only driver to use the car all season, where he scored the car's only points at Spa, which was red-flagged due to an accident involving Alfonso de Vinuesa and Luis Pérez-Sala. Forti was the only team to use the chassis in 1988 (alongside with Lola T88/50), but the team did not score any points at all with either car that year. Forti switched to Lola T89/50 chassis full-time for the following season, ending the car's participation in Formula 3000.

=== Formula One ===
For the 1988 Brazilian Grand Prix, the car passed Formula One scrutineering, allowing Caffi to take part in pre-qualifying. He predictably finished in last place, 18 seconds slower than the pole position time of Ayrton Senna and did not qualify for the race.

The F188 chassis, fitted with the Cosworth DFZ 3.5 litre engine, was ready in time for the next race in San Marino. It would be used for the remainder of the 1988 Formula One season.

The Dallara 3087 is the last non-Formula One car and the last car to use original Cosworth DFV engine to enter a Formula One Grand Prix.

== Complete Formula One results ==
(key) (results in bold indicate pole position)

Year	Entrant	Engine	Tyres	Drivers	1	2	3	4	5	6	7	8	9	10	11	12	13	14	15	16	Points	WCC
1988	Scuderia Italia	Ford DFV 3.0 V8	**G**		BRA	SMR	MON	MEX	CAN	DET	FRA	GBR	GER	HUN	BEL	ITA	POR	ESP	JPN	AUS	**0**	**NC**
1988	Scuderia Italia	Ford DFV 3.0 V8	**G**	Alex Caffi	DNPQ																**0**	**NC**
