= Arrows A10 =

Formula One Car

Arrows A10 Arrows A10B
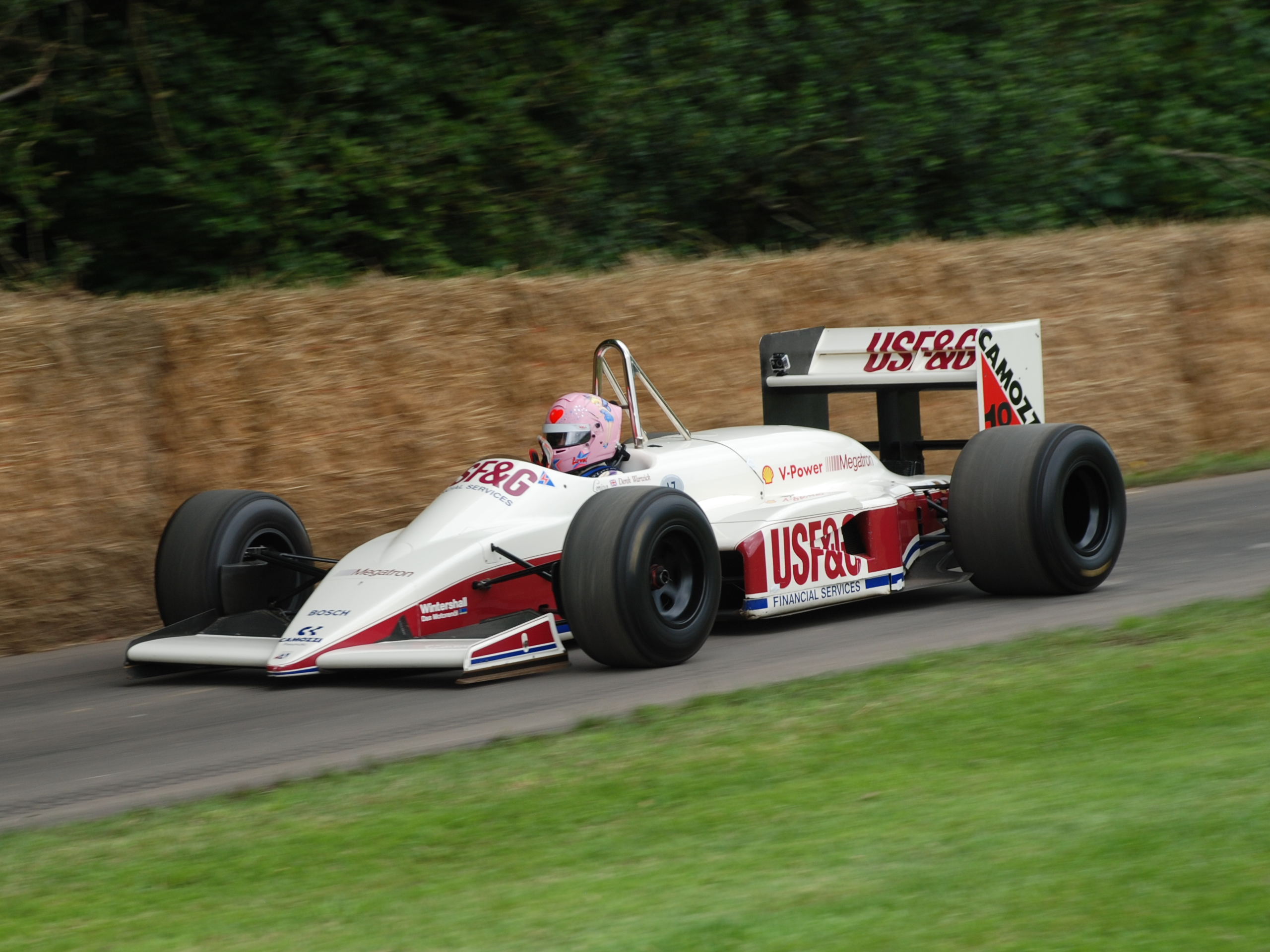
- The A10 at the 2016 Goodwood Festival of Speed
- Category: Formula One
- Constructor: Arrows
- Designer: Ross Brawn
- Predecessor: A9
- Successor: A11

Technical specifications
- Chassis: Carbon fibre monocoque
- Suspension (front): Double wishbones, push-rod dampers
- Suspension (rear): Double wishbones, push-rod dampers
- Axle track: Front: 1,803 mm (71.0 in); Rear: 1,625 mm (64.0 in)
- Wheelbase: 2,743 mm (108.0 in)
- Engine: Megatron 1,500 cc (91.5 cu in) inline-four, mid-engine, rear-wheel-drive, longitudinally-mounted, turbocharged 1987: 4.0 BAR turbo-limited 1988: 2.5 BAR turbo-limited
- Transmission: Hewland-Arrows 6-speed manual
- Power: 1987: 1,000 hp (746 kW; 1,014 PS) (qual), 850 hp (634 kW; 862 PS) (race); 1988: 640 bhp (477 kW; 649 PS)
- Weight: 540 kg (1,190 lb)
- Fuel: Wintershall
- Tyres: Goodyear

Competition history
- Notable entrants: USF&G Arrows Megatron
- Notable drivers: 17. (United Kingdom) Derek Warwick; 18. (United States) Eddie Cheever
- Debut: 1987 Brazilian Grand Prix
- Last event: 1988 Australian Grand Prix
Races	Wins	Podiums	Poles	F/Laps
32	0	1	0	0
- Constructors' Championships: 0
- Drivers' Championships: 0

The Arrows A10 was a Formula One car designed by Ross Brawn for the Arrows team. The original A10 was used in the 1987 Formula One World Championship while an updated version, the A10B, was used in the 1988 Championship. In both seasons, the car was powered by a Megatron-badged BMW turbocharged engine, and driven by Briton Derek Warwick and American Eddie Cheever.

== 1987 ==
As BMW announced its intention to officially withdraw at the end of 1986, Arrows team boss Jackie Oliver brokered a deal with support from its primary sponsor, USF&G, to continue the use of the upright 4cyl BMW engines under the name of USF&G subsidiary Megatron, Inc., founded by long-time F1 aficionado John J. Schmidt. The engines were serviced by the team's long time engine tuner Heini Mader from Switzerland, the former mechanic of Jo Siffert.

For 1987 the engines were fitted with a FIA approved pop-off valve which was mandatory for all turbo engines in the season with turbo boost restricted to 4.0 bar (previously turbo boost was restricted only by what the engineers felt the engines could handle, though most, including the BMW M12, usually went no further than 5.6 Bar). Power from the engine, which always had the ability to handle high boost settings, was still estimated to be over 1,000 bhp (746 kW; 1,014 PS) for qualifying and around 850 bhp (634 kW; 862 PS) for races with the cars also restricted to just 195 litres of fuel per race. During the season the team continually experienced problems with the pop-off valve cutting in well below the 4.0 Bar limit in both qualifying and races, with Warwick reporting at the opening race in Brazil that the valve was restricting boost to 3.5 Bar, and sometimes it was cutting in at 2.6 Bar (a loss of around 200 bhp (149 kW; 203 PS)), a situation that didn't improve throughout the season. Without the resources and financial backing available to the likes of Ferrari or Honda, it would take Mader until the three quarters of the way through the 1988 season to solve the problem.

In 1987 the team improved from its 10th place in 1986 to finish in 7th place in 1987. Englishman Derek Warwick scored 3 points for the year with a 5th in the British Grand Prix, and 6th in Hungary, while his American teammate Eddie Cheever managed to score 8 points from a 4th in Belgium, 6th in Detroit and Portugal and another 4th in Mexico, in what was his comeback year after missing most of the 1986 season when racing Sportscars for Tom Walkinshaw Racing's Silk Cut Jaguar team. His only Formula One race in 1986 was in Detroit for the Haas Lola team.

The car scored 11 points for the season leaving them in 7th place in the Constructors' Championship.

== 1988 ==
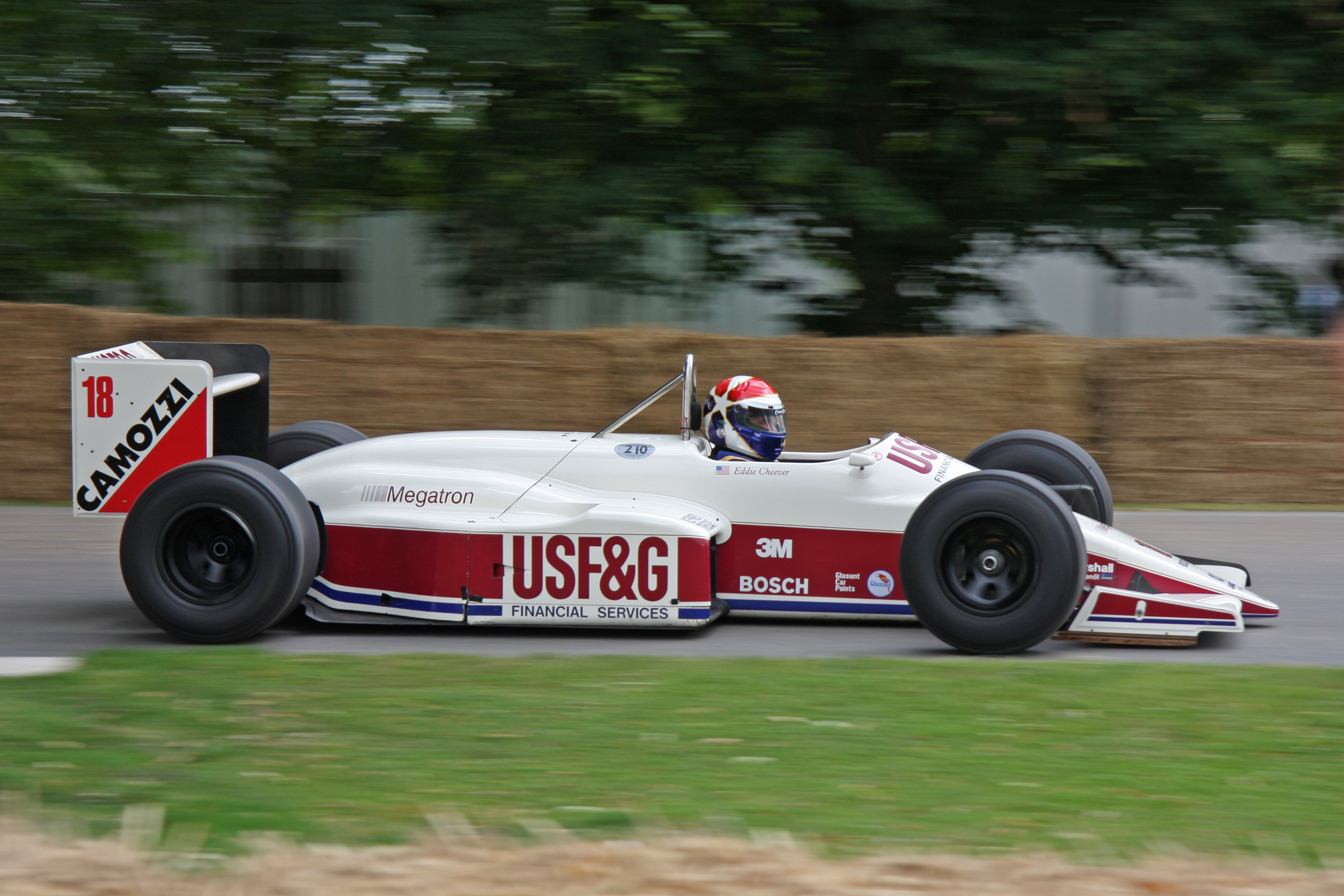
Arrows A10B at the 2008 Goodwood Festival of Speed

The car, with upgrades to suspension and aerodynamics, was dubbed the A10B and was more successful in 1988 when most teams had converted to running 3.5L naturally aspirated engines in preparation for turbocharged engines being banned from 1989. Arrows continued with the Megatron turbos and finished 5th in the 1988 Constructors' Championship and Eddie Cheever scored the A10's only podium finish with a 3rd placing at the 1988 Italian Grand Prix. Warwick also finished 4th in that race, only 0.582 seconds behind Cheever, in a great result for the team. Warwick finished 8th in the Drivers' Championship with 17 points while Cheever scored 6 points to finish 12th.

During 1988 Arrows were rated as a good chance to pick up points over the naturally aspirated cars due to having more power with the Megatron turbo, reported have around 640 bhp (477 kW; 649 PS) with the new 2.5 bar turbo limit (down in 1988 from 1987's 4.0 bar limit). The turbos were also restricted to just 150 litres of fuel per race in 1988, while the 'atmo' cars were limited only to what the car designers deemed necessary (the Benetton B188 allegedly had the largest fuel tank at 215 litres). However, as with 1987, the FIA mandated pop-off valve had a habit of cutting in well before the turbo limit, which not only restricted power but frustratingly for the drivers often left the cars with plenty of fuel to spare at the end of a race. Quite often the pop-off valve cut in at 2.3 bar or below in both qualifying and races (F1 engineers estimated that each 0.1 bar was worth approximately 20 bhp (15 kW; 20 PS)) leaving Warwick and Cheever with a hard time fighting off the leading atmos of Benetton, Williams and March, let alone challenging the other leading turbo teams: McLaren-Honda (who won 15 of the 16 races in 1988), Ferrari (who won the race that McLaren did not) and Lotus-Honda.

It took until just before the Italian Grand Prix for Heini Mader to get on top of the pop-off valve problem, which turned out to be the FIA unit being located too high above the engine, resulting in less power, a problem that Honda and Ferrari engineers had long since solved thanks to the resources (money) available to them from their respective factories. By moving the valve closer to the engine, Mader had allowed Warwick and Cheever to finally exploit the raw power of the straight 4 turbo and to be much closer to the front than they had been all season. However, while the pop-off valve issue was finally fixed, the engine's other main problem that had remained since the 4-cylinder BMW had first appeared in F1 back in 1982 still remained, lack of throttle response from turbo lag followed by the power coming on like a light switch. This hampered the team in the final four races of the season, especially at the Spanish Grand Prix held at the tight Circuito de Jerez where the cars are constantly on and off the throttle over the course of a lap and good throttle response counts for more than outright top speed. Warwick could only qualify 17th at Jerez while Cheever started on the back row of the grid in 25th, his worst qualifying performance since he failed to qualify for the 1984 Monaco Grand Prix in a turbocharged V8 Alfa Romeo. In qualifying at Monza and with its Megatron engine finally exploiting its 640 horses at the full 2.5 bar limit, Warwick and Cheever in the A10B were faster through the start/finish line speed trap at 310 km/h (193 mph), than the McLaren-Hondas which managed 305 km/h (190 mph). Cheever, running less wing than his team mate, was also the fastest through the speed trap at the Rettifilo at 200 mph (322 km/h), comfortably faster than the McLarens and Ferraris which were only trapped at 192 mph (309 km/h). Despite this Cheever, who qualified the faster of the two drivers in 5th place (Warwick was 6th, only 0.155 slower), was still 1.686 seconds slower than pole man Ayrton Senna (McLaren). The main difference being the downforce that the lowline McLarens could run for better grip, as well as the superior acceleration of the Honda V6. However this was a considerable improvement for the team who had been some 5.8 seconds slower (Warwick) than the McLarens just three races earlier at Hockenheim in Germany where on the old circuit's 1.6 KM long straight to the Bremsschikane, the A10B's were actually slower through the speed trap than the naturally aspirated March's with their Judd V8's which trapped at 312 km/h (194 mph) (that weekend in Germany, the McLaren-Honda's trapped fastest of all at a 1988 seasons high 333 km/h (207 mph)).

During qualifying for the German Grand Prix, Eddie Cheever, on a quick lap, had a close call at almost 180 mph (290 km/h) on the straight before the circuit's "Stadium" section. On a hot lap, Cheever moved to his left to pass the Eurobrun of F1's oldest rookie, Oscar Larrauri, while Ferrari's Gerhard Berger was on his own hot lap and was attempting to pass them both, the problem being Cheever just had taken up what was left of the road right as Berger wanted to be there. To avoid a crash, Berger put two wheels on the grass which threw his car into a wild spin back across the track and directly between the Arrows and EuroBrun, just missing taking both cars and himself out in a high-speed crash (luckily the Ferrari did not hit the armco and was able to drive away).

== Complete Formula One results ==
(key)

Year	Entrant	Chassis	Engine	Tyres	Drivers	1	2	3	4	5	6	7	8	9	10	11	12	13	14	15	16	Pts.	WCC
1987	USF&G Arrows	A10	Megatron; S4 tc	G		BRA	SMR	BEL	MON	DET	FRA	GBR	GER	HUN	AUT	ITA	POR	ESP	MEX	JPN	AUS	11	7th
1987	USF&G Arrows	A10	Megatron; S4 tc	G	Derek Warwick	Ret	11	Ret	Ret	Ret	Ret	5	Ret	6	Ret	Ret	13	10	Ret	10	Ret	11	7th
1987	USF&G Arrows	A10	Megatron; S4 tc	G	Eddie Cheever	Ret	Ret	4	Ret	6	Ret	Ret	Ret	8	Ret	Ret	6	8	4	9	Ret	11	7th
1988	USF&G Arrows	A10B	Megatron; S4 tc	G		BRA	SMR	MON	MEX	CAN	DET	FRA	GBR	GER	HUN	BEL	ITA	POR	ESP	JPN	AUS	23	5th
1988	USF&G Arrows	A10B	Megatron; S4 tc	G	Derek Warwick	4	9	4	5	7	Ret	Ret	6	7	Ret	5	4	4	Ret	Ret	Ret	23	5th
1988	USF&G Arrows	A10B	Megatron; S4 tc	G	Eddie Cheever	8	7	Ret	6	Ret	Ret	11	7	10	Ret	6	3	Ret	Ret	Ret	Ret	23	5th
