= 1988 Hungarian Grand Prix =

- Race 10 of 16 in the 1988 Formula One World Championship

Race details
- Date: 7 August 1988
- Official name: Pop 84 Magyar Nagydíj
- Location: Hungaroring, Mogyoród, Pest, Hungary
- Course: Permanent racing facility
- Course length: 4.014 km (2.494 miles)
- Distance: 76 laps, 305.064 km (189.558 miles)
- Weather: Sunny and hot

Pole position
| Driver | (Brazil) Ayrton Senna | McLaren-Honda |
- Time: 1:27.635

Fastest lap
| Driver | (France) Alain Prost | McLaren-Honda |
- Time: 1:30.639 on lap 51

Podium
| First | (Brazil) Ayrton Senna | McLaren-Honda |
| Second | (France) Alain Prost | McLaren-Honda |
| Third | (Belgium) Thierry Boutsen | Benetton-Ford |

The 1988 Hungarian Grand Prix was a Formula One motor race held on 7 August 1988 at the Hungaroring, Mogyoród, Pest, Hungary. It was the tenth race of the 1988 Formula One World Championship.

The 76-lap race was won from pole position by Brazilian driver Ayrton Senna, driving a McLaren-Honda, with French teammate Alain Prost second and Belgian Thierry Boutsen third in a Benetton-Ford. The win, Senna's sixth of the season, moved him level on points with Prost at the top of the Drivers' Championship.

== Gallery ==
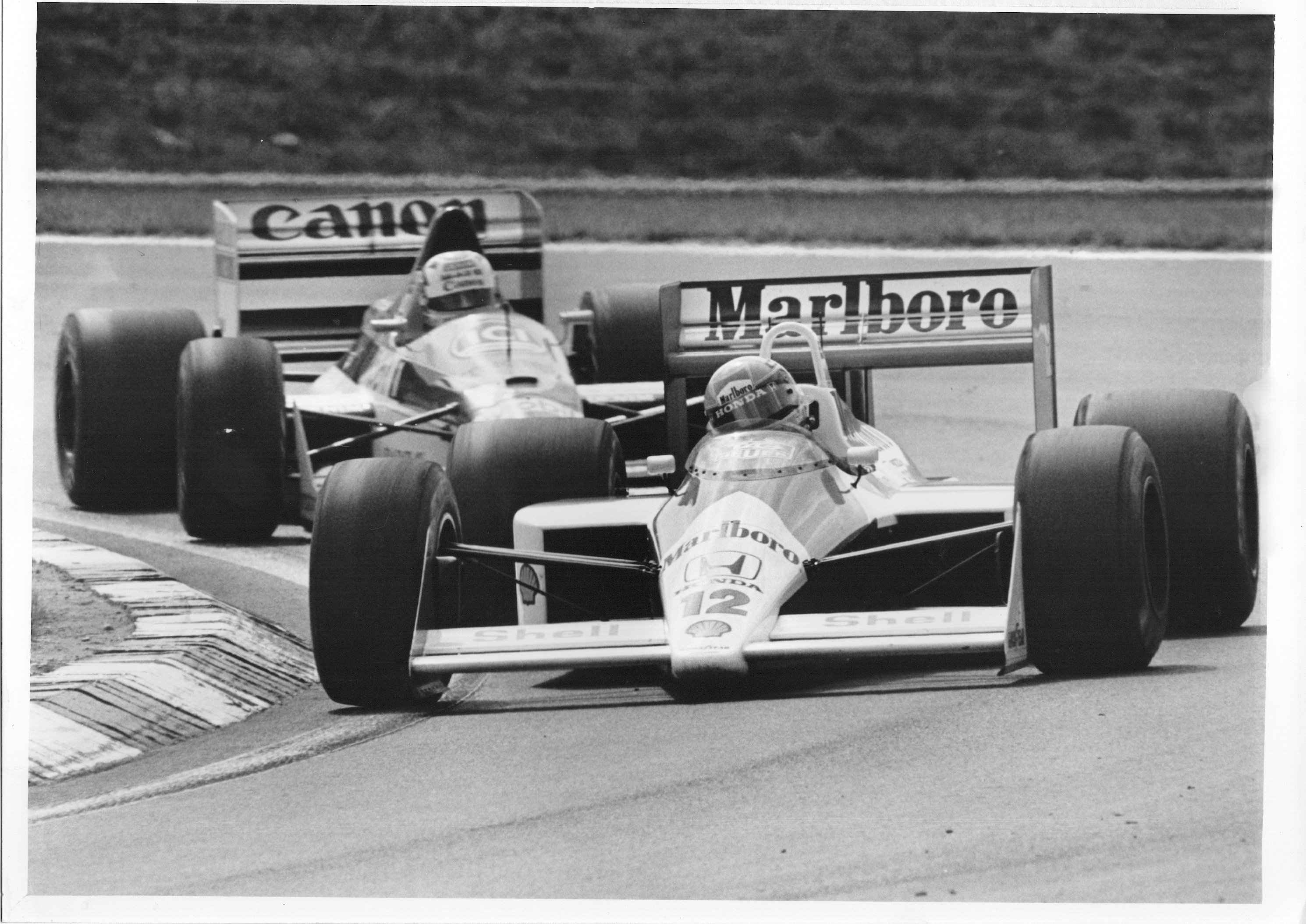
Senna leads Mansell

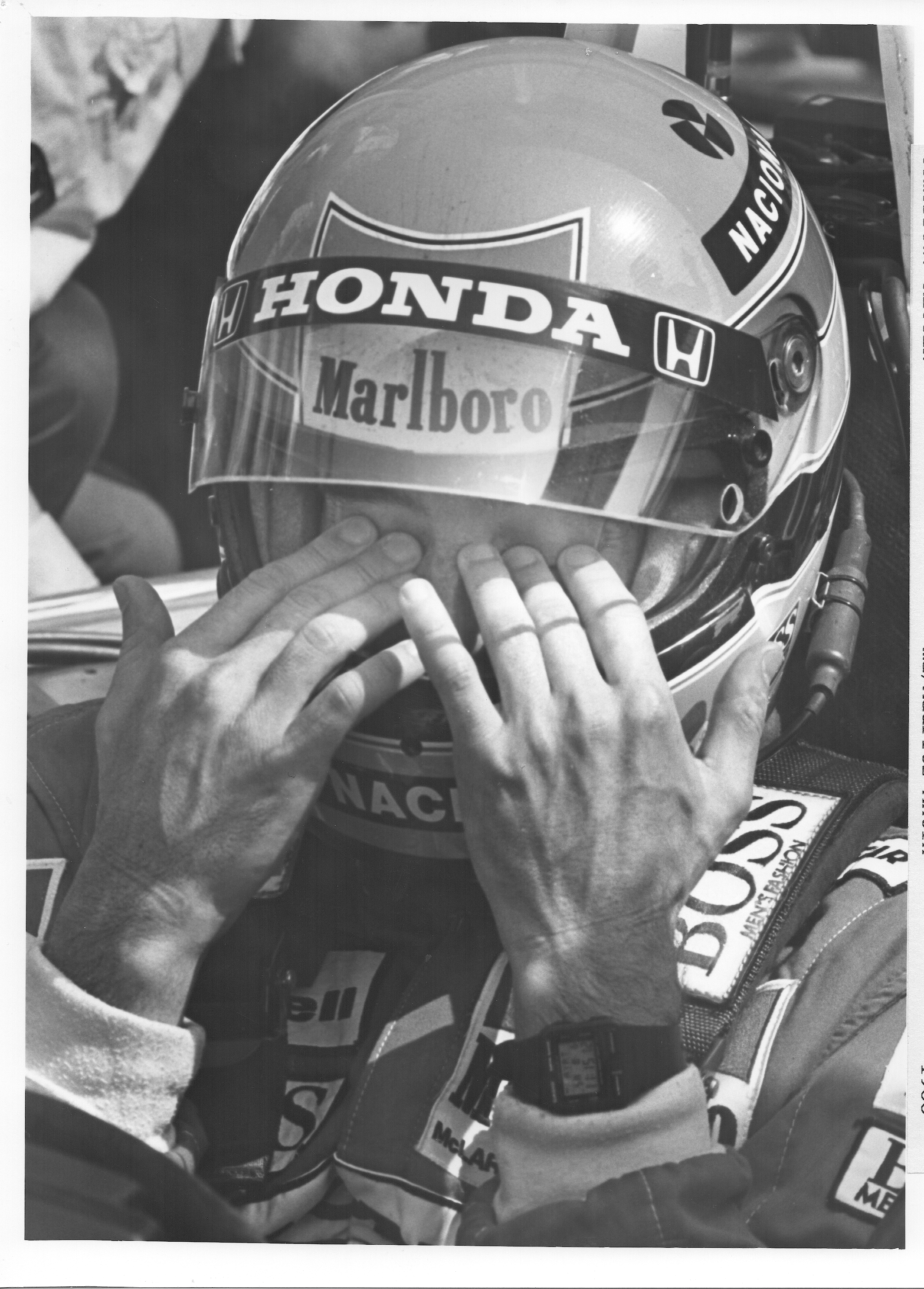
Senna in his helmet

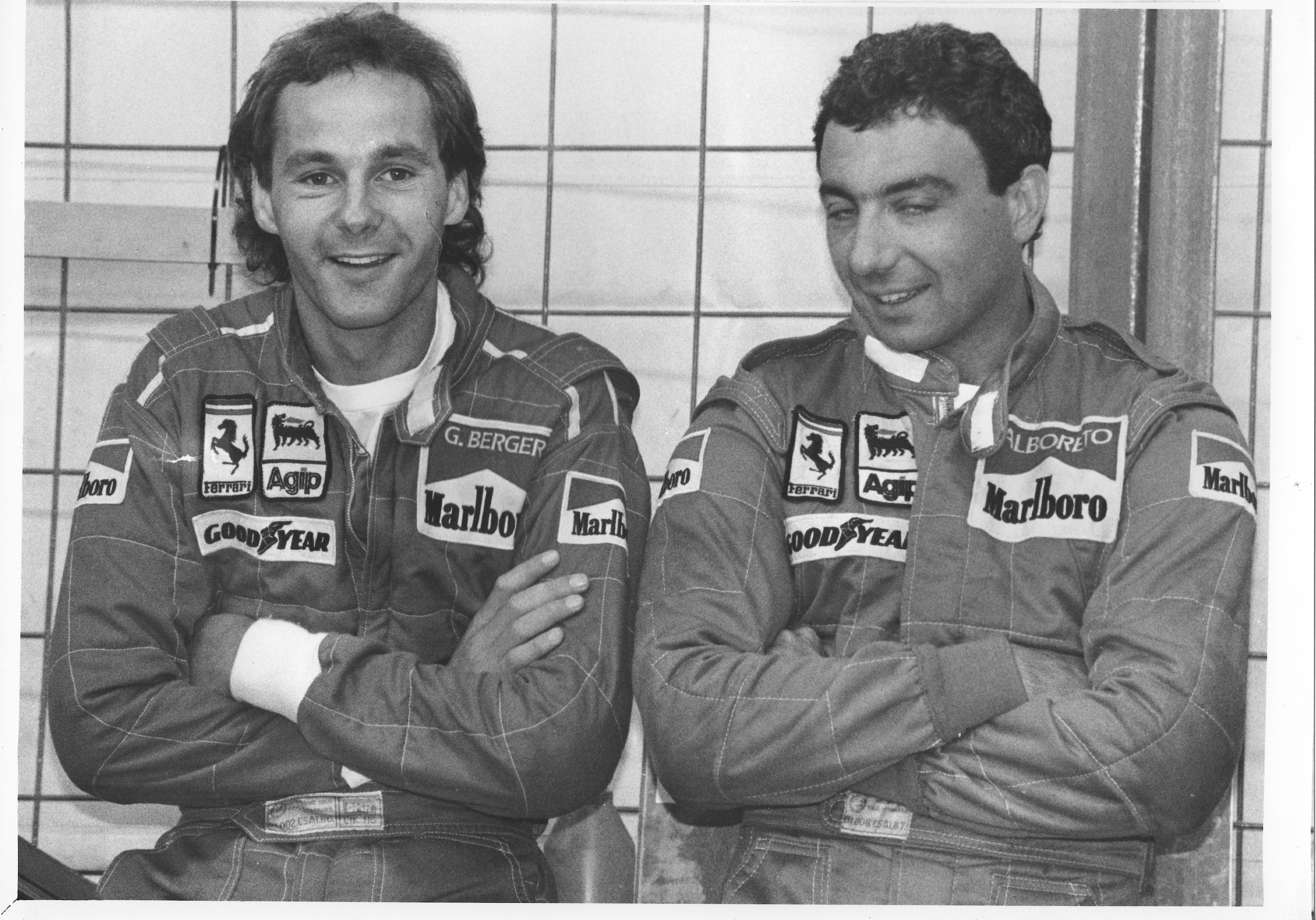
Berger and Alboreto

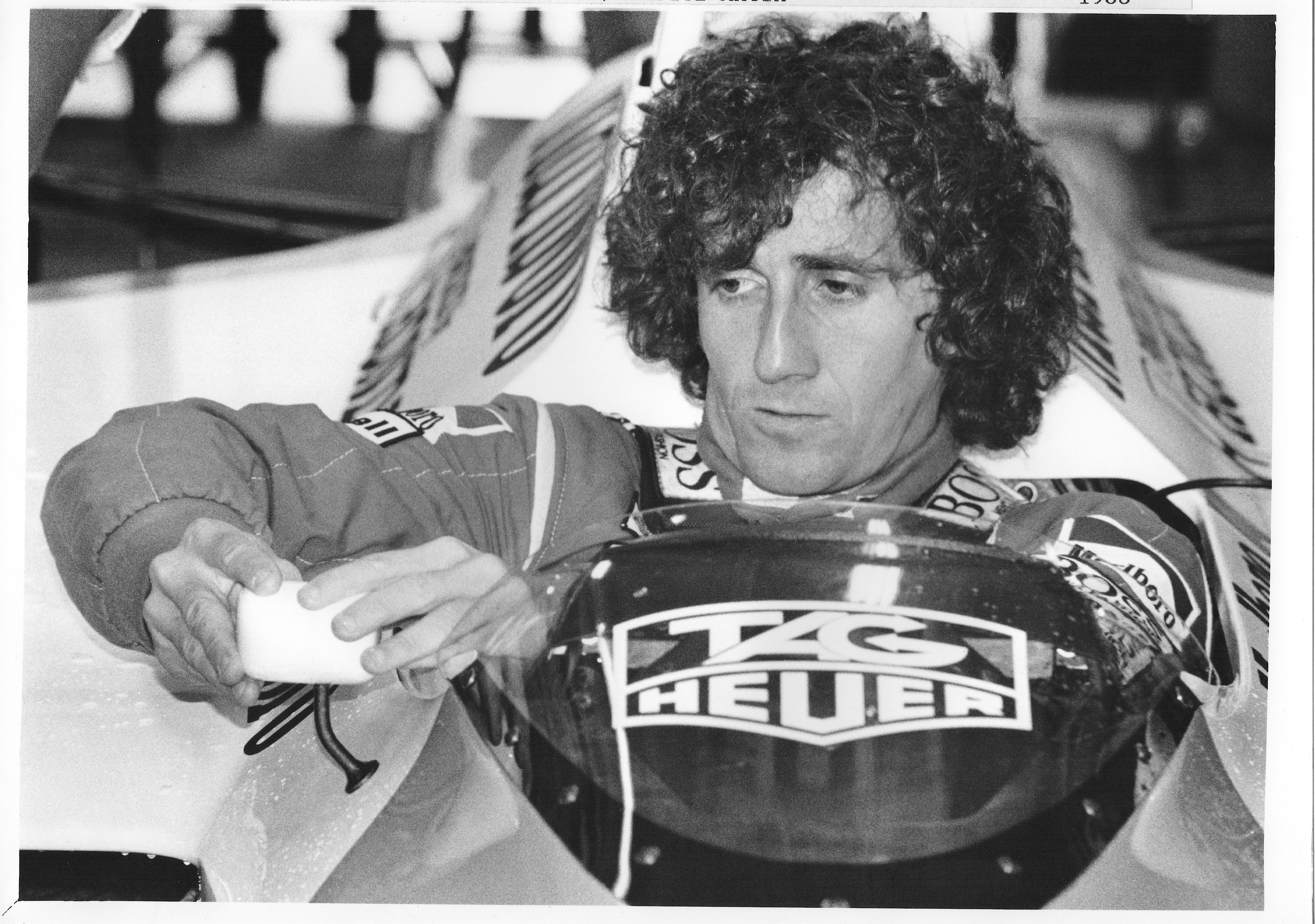
Prost

== Report ==
=== Qualifying ===
The tight and twisty Hungaroring offered a chance for the naturally-aspirated cars against the turbos, and they took seven of the top ten positions in qualifying. However, Ayrton Senna still took pole position in his McLaren-Honda, his eighth of the season, pipping the Williams of Nigel Mansell by 0.1 seconds. Mansell was driving against doctor's orders as he had developed chickenpox. On the second row of the grid were Thierry Boutsen in the Benetton and Ivan Capelli in the March, and on the third row were Alessandro Nannini in the second Benetton and Riccardo Patrese in the second Williams. Senna's teammate Alain Prost could only manage seventh, while Gerhard Berger was ninth in his Ferrari, the two separated by the second March of Maurício Gugelmin. Completing the top ten was Alex Caffi in the Dallara.

=== Race ===
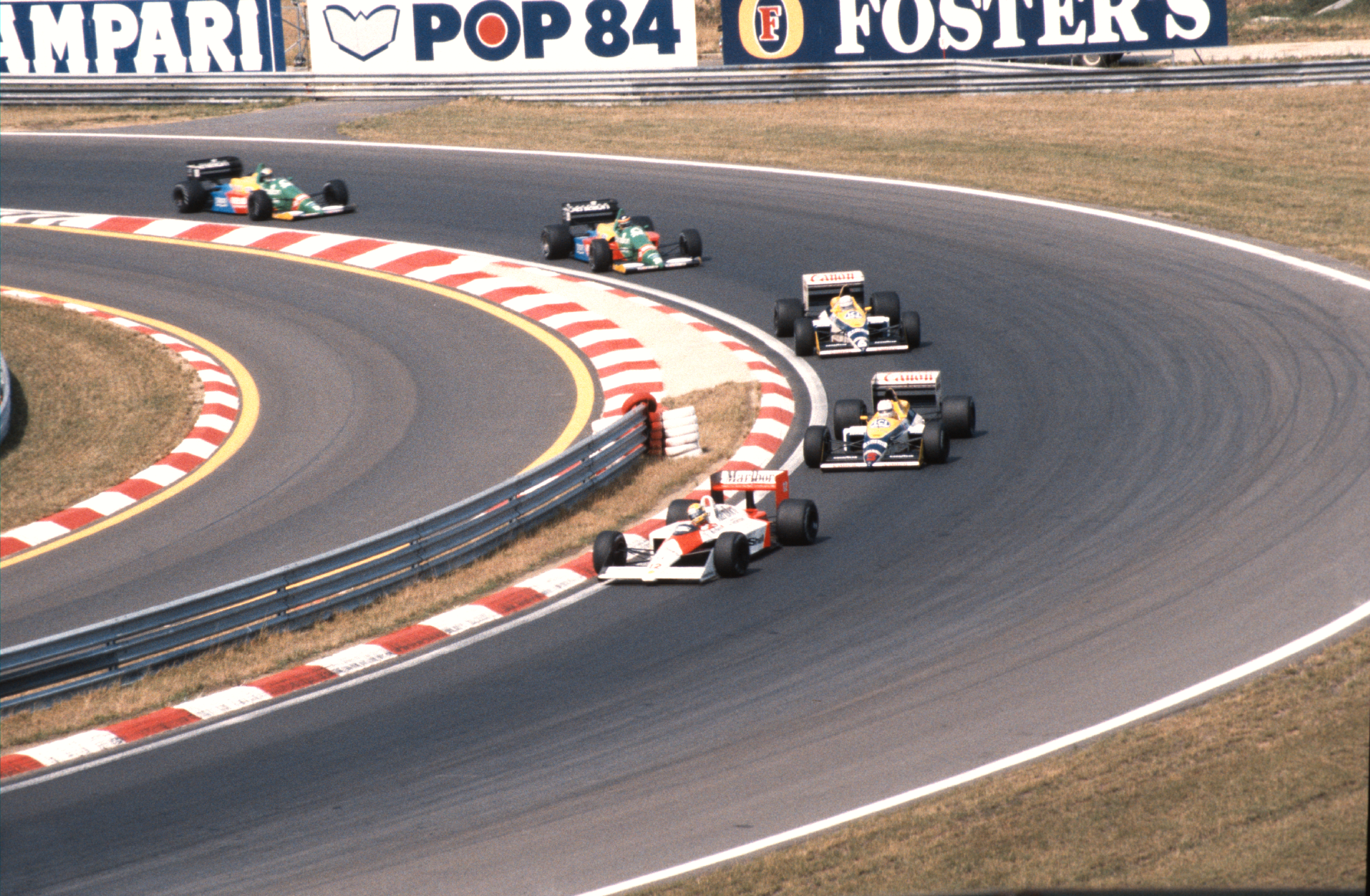
Senna leads in front of the Williams cars and Benetton cars, next to the pit entry

Mansell made a good start and almost took the lead but Senna held onto his position, and thanks to the superior power of his Honda engine he pulled away slightly down the main straight to head the field into turn 1. Patrese also made an excellent start climbing from 6th to 3rd while Prost was slow away and was only 9th at the end of the first lap. Capelli made a great start and in fact almost overtook Mansell into the first turn before his engine suddenly went sour and he pitted after just 2 laps to have a serious misfire investigated. On lap 12, Mansell lost downforce running close behind the McLaren and spun down to 4th place, leaving Senna to fend off the attacks of the other Williams, that of Patrese. The Italian later dropped back with engine problems, while similar problems were afflicting Nannini.

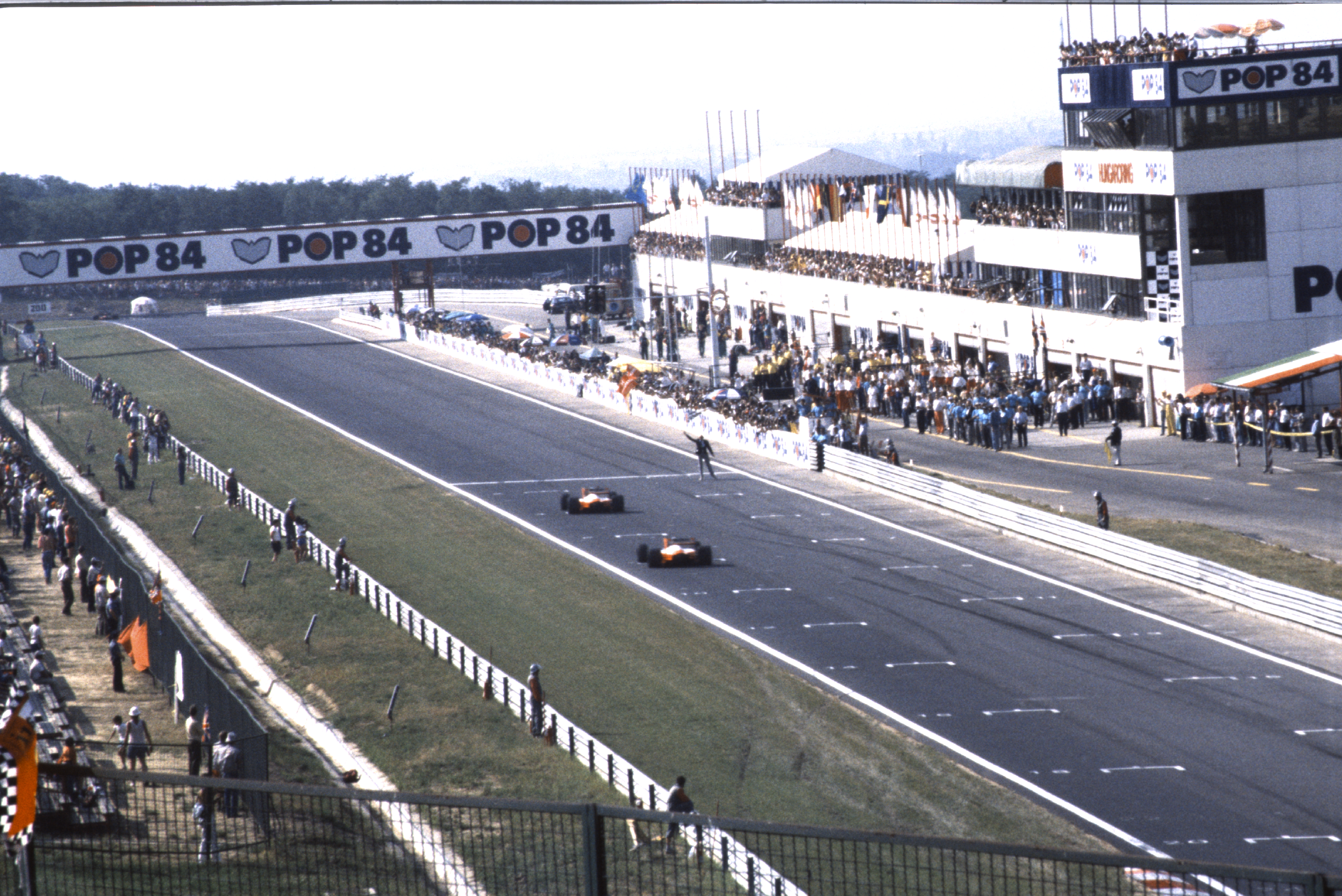
Senna took the chequered flag less than a second before Prost

On lap 32, Prost had climbed to 3rd place behind Senna and Boutsen. On lap 37, Mansell pitted to replace tyres, which were ragged and causing vibrations to the car. Prost passed Boutsen on lap 47 and set out chasing down Senna. Two laps later, while Senna prepared to lap Yannick Dalmas' Lola and Gabriele Tarquini's Coloni, Prost passed all three of them in a breathtaking move down the main straight. However he was too quick going into the first turn and ran wide enabling Senna to regain the lead. Prost set the fastest lap of the race but was forced to drop back with vibrations caused by a loose wheel bearing. On lap 58 Mansell retired still feeling the effects of chickenpox. He later admitted that racing in Hungary was a mistake as he was then forced to miss the next two races. Boutsen closed on Prost, but the Frenchman pressed on and pushed Senna. Just half a second covered the two McLarens as they crossed the line. Boutsen took the third spot on the podium, unable to challenge further due to a broken exhaust. Berger, Gugelmin and Patrese completed the points scorers.

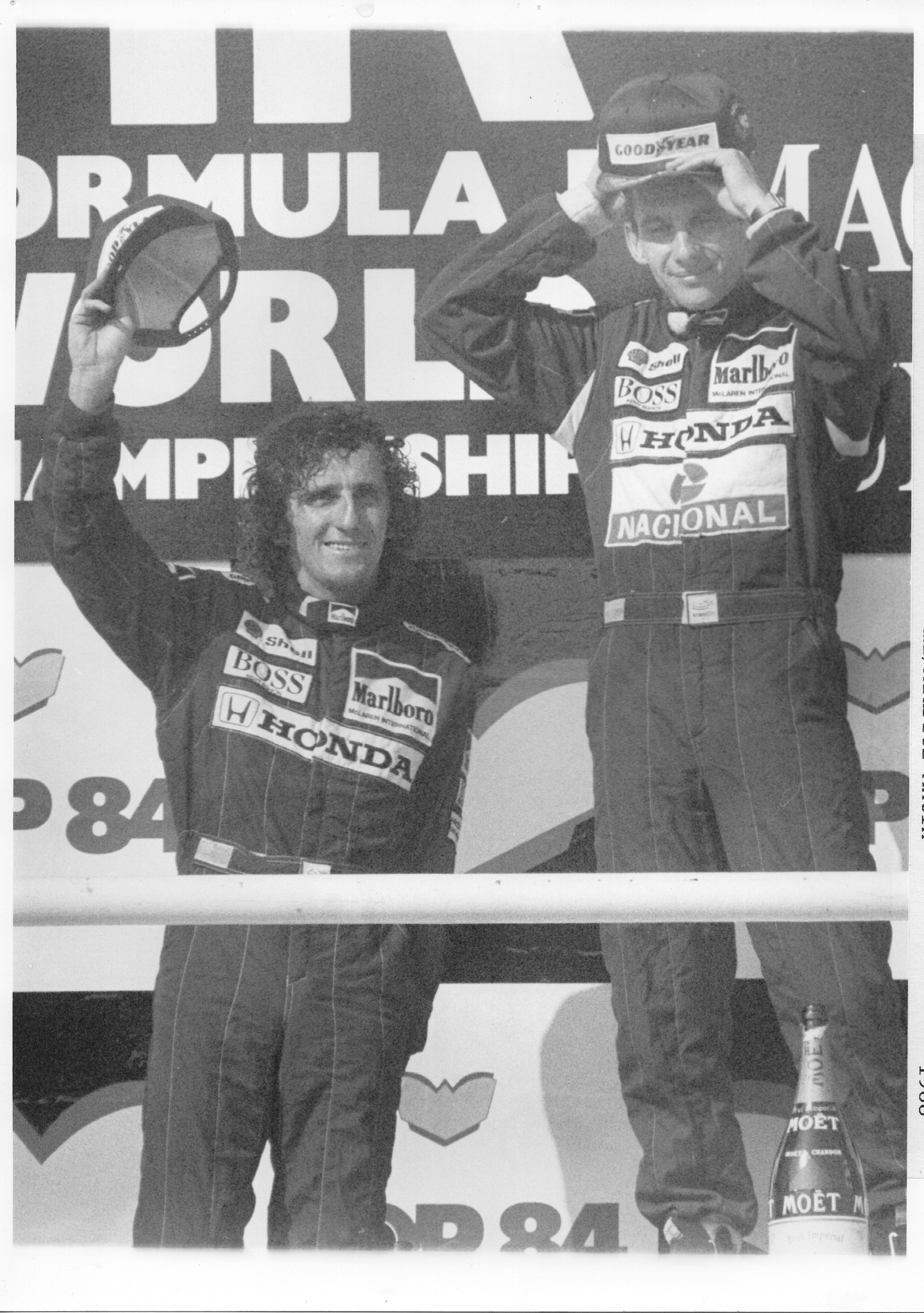
Alain Prost of France (L) waves with his cap to the audience, while his team mate Ayrton Senna of Brazil puts his cap on in Budapest on August 7, 1988. Prost finished second in today's Hungarian F1 Grand Prix after Senna.

== Classification ==
=== Pre-qualifying ===
| Pos | No | Driver | Constructor | Time | Gap |
|---|---|---|---|---|---|
| 1 | 36 | (Italy) Alex Caffi | Dallara-Ford | 2:01.593 | |
| 2 | 32 | (Argentina) Oscar Larrauri | EuroBrun-Ford | 2:03.343 | +1.750 |
| 3 | 31 | (Italy) Gabriele Tarquini | Coloni-Ford | 2:03.371 | +1.778 |
| 4 | 33 | (Italy) Stefano Modena | EuroBrun-Ford | 2:04.168 | +2.575 |
| DNPQ | 21 | (Italy) Nicola Larini | Osella | 2:05.626 | +4.033 |

=== Qualifying ===
| Pos | No | Driver | Constructor | Q1 | Q2 | Gap |
|---|---|---|---|---|---|---|
| 1 | 12 | (Brazil) Ayrton Senna | McLaren-Honda | 1:30.422 | 1:27.635 | |
| 2 | 5 | (United Kingdom) Nigel Mansell | Williams-Judd | 1:30.151 | 1:27.743 | +0.108 |
| 3 | 20 | (Belgium) Thierry Boutsen | Benetton-Ford | 1:30.780 | 1:27.970 | +0.335 |
| 4 | 16 | (Italy) Ivan Capelli | March-Judd | 1:32.675 | 1:28.350 | +0.715 |
| 5 | 19 | (Italy) Alessandro Nannini | Benetton-Ford | 1:29.779 | 1:28.493 | +0.858 |
| 6 | 6 | (Italy) Riccardo Patrese | Williams-Judd | 1:30.382 | 1:28.569 | +0.934 |
| 7 | 11 | (France) Alain Prost | McLaren-Honda | 1:29.589 | 1:28.778 | +1.143 |
| 8 | 15 | (Brazil) Maurício Gugelmin | March-Judd | 1:35.237 | 1:29.099 | +1.464 |
| 9 | 28 | (Austria) Gerhard Berger | Ferrari | 1:31.192 | 1:29.244 | +1.609 |
| 10 | 36 | (Italy) Alex Caffi | Dallara-Ford | 1:32.887 | 1:29.891 | +2.346 |
| 11 | 24 | (Spain) Luis Pérez-Sala | Minardi-Ford | 1:33.494 | 1:30.103 | +2.468 |
| 12 | 17 | (United Kingdom) Derek Warwick | Arrows-Megatron | 1:32.514 | 1:30.185 | +2.550 |
| 13 | 1 | (Brazil) Nelson Piquet | Lotus-Honda | 1:35.346 | 1:30.405 | +2.770 |
| 14 | 18 | (United States) Eddie Cheever | Arrows-Megatron | 1:32.589 | 1:30.908 | +3.273 |
| 15 | 27 | (Italy) Michele Alboreto | Ferrari | 1:32.304 | 1:31.052 | +3.417 |
| 16 | 23 | (Italy) Pierluigi Martini | Minardi-Ford | 1:33.597 | 1:31.123 | +3.488 |
| 17 | 29 | (France) Yannick Dalmas | Lola-Ford | 1:33.192 | 1:31.200 | +3.565 |
| 18 | 22 | (Italy) Andrea de Cesaris | Rial-Ford | 1:48.994 | 1:31.523 | +3.888 |
| 19 | 2 | (Japan) Satoru Nakajima | Lotus-Honda | 1:34.194 | 1:31.646 | +4.011 |
| 20 | 30 | (France) Philippe Alliot | Lola-Ford | 1:33.132 | 1:31.719 | +4.084 |
| 21 | 3 | (United Kingdom) Jonathan Palmer | Tyrrell-Ford | 1:34.001 | 1:31.741 | +4.106 |
| 22 | 31 | (Italy) Gabriele Tarquini | Coloni-Ford | 1:35.991 | 1:32.160 | +4.525 |
| 23 | 14 | (France) Philippe Streiff | AGS-Ford | 1:32.973 | 1:32.265 | +4.630 |
| 24 | 26 | (Sweden) Stefan Johansson | Ligier-Judd | 1:34.843 | 1:32.342 | +4.707 |
| 25 | 25 | (France) René Arnoux | Ligier-Judd | 1:35.685 | 1:32.477 | +4.842 |
| 26 | 33 | (Italy) Stefano Modena | EuroBrun-Ford | 1:35.389 | 1:32.614 | +4.979 |
| DNQ | 32 | (Argentina) Oscar Larrauri | EuroBrun-Ford | 1:35.990 | 1:32.987 | +5.352 |
| DNQ | 10 | (West Germany) Bernd Schneider | Zakspeed | 1:36.716 | 1:33.357 | +5.722 |
| DNQ | 4 | (United Kingdom) Julian Bailey | Tyrrell-Ford | 1:35.693 | 1:33.694 | +6.059 |
| DNQ | 9 | (Italy) Piercarlo Ghinzani | Zakspeed | 1:36.223 | 1:34.701 | +7.066 |

=== Race ===
| Pos | No | Driver | Constructor | Laps | Time/Retired | Grid | Points |
|---|---|---|---|---|---|---|---|
| 1 | 12 | (Brazil) Ayrton Senna | McLaren-Honda | 76 | 1:57:47.081 | 1 | 9 |
| 2 | 11 | (France) Alain Prost | McLaren-Honda | 76 | + 0.529 | 7 | 6 |
| 3 | 20 | (Belgium) Thierry Boutsen | Benetton-Ford | 76 | + 31.410 | 3 | 4 |
| 4 | 28 | (Austria) Gerhard Berger | Ferrari | 76 | + 1:28.670 | 9 | 3 |
| 5 | 15 | (Brazil) Maurício Gugelmin | March-Judd | 75 | + 1 Lap | 8 | 2 |
| 6 | 6 | (Italy) Riccardo Patrese | Williams-Judd | 75 | + 1 Lap | 6 | 1 |
| 7 | 2 | (Japan) Satoru Nakajima | Lotus-Honda | 73 | + 3 Laps | 19 | |
| 8 | 1 | (Brazil) Nelson Piquet | Lotus-Honda | 73 | + 3 Laps | 13 | |
| 9 | 29 | (France) Yannick Dalmas | Lola-Ford | 73 | + 3 Laps | 17 | |
| 10 | 24 | (Spain) Luis Pérez-Sala | Minardi-Ford | 72 | + 4 Laps | 11 | |
| 11 | 33 | (Italy) Stefano Modena | EuroBrun-Ford | 72 | + 4 Laps | 26 | |
| 12 | 30 | (France) Philippe Alliot | Lola-Ford | 72 | + 4 Laps | 20 | |
| 13 | 31 | (Italy) Gabriele Tarquini | Coloni-Ford | 71 | + 5 Laps | 22 | |
| Ret | 17 | (United Kingdom) Derek Warwick | Arrows-Megatron | 65 | Brakes | 12 | |
| Ret | 5 | (United Kingdom) Nigel Mansell | Williams-Judd | 60 | Driver Unwell | 2 | |
| Ret | 18 | (United States) Eddie Cheever | Arrows-Megatron | 55 | Brakes | 14 | |
| Ret | 27 | (Italy) Michele Alboreto | Ferrari | 40 | Electrical | 15 | |
| Ret | 25 | (France) René Arnoux | Ligier-Judd | 32 | Engine | 25 | |
| Ret | 22 | (Italy) Andrea de Cesaris | Rial-Ford | 28 | Halfshaft | 18 | |
| Ret | 19 | (Italy) Alessandro Nannini | Benetton-Ford | 24 | Overheating | 5 | |
| Ret | 36 | (Italy) Alex Caffi | Dallara-Ford | 22 | Engine | 10 | |
| Ret | 26 | (Sweden) Stefan Johansson | Ligier-Judd | 19 | Throttle | 24 | |
| Ret | 23 | (Italy) Pierluigi Martini | Minardi-Ford | 8 | Collision | 16 | |
| Ret | 14 | (France) Philippe Streiff | AGS-Ford | 8 | Collision | 23 | |
| Ret | 16 | (Italy) Ivan Capelli | March-Judd | 5 | Engine | 4 | |
| Ret | 3 | (United Kingdom) Jonathan Palmer | Tyrrell-Ford | 3 | Engine | 21 | |
| DNQ | 32 | (Argentina) Oscar Larrauri | EuroBrun-Ford | | | | |
| DNQ | 10 | (West Germany) Bernd Schneider | Zakspeed | | | | |
| DNQ | 4 | (United Kingdom) Julian Bailey | Tyrrell-Ford | | | | |
| DNQ | 9 | (Italy) Piercarlo Ghinzani | Zakspeed | | | | |
| DNPQ | 21 | (Italy) Nicola Larini | Osella | | | | |

== Championship standings after the race ==
Drivers' Championship standings

| Pos | Driver | Points |
|---|---|---|
| 1 | (Brazil) Ayrton Senna | 66 |
| 2 | (France) Alain Prost | 66 |
| 3 | (Austria) Gerhard Berger | 28 |
| 4 | (Belgium) Thierry Boutsen | 16 |
| 5 | (Italy) Michele Alboreto | 16 |

Constructors' Championship standings

| Pos | Constructor | Points |
|---|---|---|
| 1 | (United Kingdom) McLaren-Honda | 132 |
| 2 | (Italy) Ferrari | 44 |
| 3 | (United Kingdom) Benetton-Ford | 22 |
| 4 | (United Kingdom) Lotus-Honda | 16 |
| 5 | (United Kingdom) Arrows-Megatron | 10 |

- Note: Only the top five positions are included for both sets of standings.

| Previous race: 1988 German Grand Prix | FIA Formula One World Championship; 1988 season | Next race: 1988 Belgian Grand Prix |
| Previous race: 1987 Hungarian Grand Prix | Hungarian Grand Prix | Next race: 1989 Hungarian Grand Prix |
