= 1988 Spanish Grand Prix =

- Race 14 of 16 in the 1988 Formula One World Championship

Race details
- Date: 2 October 1988
- Official name: XXX Gran Premio Tio Pepe de España
- Location: Circuito Permanente de Jerez, Jerez de la Frontera, Spain
- Course: Permanent racing facility
- Course length: 4.218 km (2.620 miles)
- Distance: 72 laps, 303.696 km (188.708 miles)
- Weather: Sunny and hot

Pole position
Driver	(Brazil) Ayrton Senna	McLaren-Honda
- Time: 1:24.067

Fastest lap
Driver	(France) Alain Prost	McLaren-Honda
- Time: 1:27.845 on lap 60

Podium
First	(France) Alain Prost	McLaren-Honda
Second	(United Kingdom) Nigel Mansell	Williams-Judd
Third	(Italy) Alessandro Nannini	Benetton-Ford

The 1988 Spanish Grand Prix was a Formula One motor race held on 2 October 1988 at the Circuito Permanente de Jerez, Jerez de la Frontera. It was the fourteenth race of the 1988 Formula One World Championship.

The 72-lap race was won by Frenchman Alain Prost, driving a McLaren-Honda, after he started from second position. British driver Nigel Mansell finished second in a Williams-Judd, with Italian Alessandro Nannini third in a Benetton-Ford. Prost's teammate and Drivers' Championship rival, Brazilian Ayrton Senna, finished fourth having started from pole position.

== Pre-race ==
After weeks of speculation, Benetton announced that British Formula 3000 driver Johnny Herbert would be joining the team in 1989 to replace Thierry Boutsen who would be joining Williams. At the time of the announcement Herbert was still in hospital recovering from his horrifying F3000 crash during the Brands Hatch round of the 1988 Championship held just 6 weeks earlier. With Alessandro Nannini remaining with the team, the Italian who had only been in Formula One since 1986, would become the team's #1 driver for 1989. Benetton also announced that they were picking up their option on Nannini and that he would also remain with the team into 1990.

== Qualifying ==
During qualifying, Riccardo Patrese was on his hot lap when the slower Julian Bailey got on the wrong side of the track and Patrese had to slow down considerably to avoid hitting Bailey. A furious Patrese retaliated by getting in front of Bailey and brake testing his Tyrrell, the subsequent collision sending Bailey's car into the air and off the track into the gravel trap. Officials at first blamed Bailey and also called his Tyrrell teammate Jonathan Palmer to the hearing for good measure on the premise that the slower Tyrrells were generally a menace and both drivers needed to be told. After a protest by Ken Tyrrell however, officials later reviewed the incident again and Patrese was fined $10,000 for his actions, although most in the Formula One paddock argued that Patrese's fine was not enough, and that he should also pay the Tyrrell team to fix the damages on Bailey's car. One unnamed driver was quoted as saying "I hope they fine him his bloody retainer. There are enough accidental shunts in this business without people actually trying to cause them....."

McLaren locked out the front row for the 10th time in 14 races in 1988 with Ayrton Senna putting his Honda powered McLaren MP4/4 on pole for the 11th time in 14 races with a motivated Alain Prost snapping at his team mate's heels only 0.067 behind. On this tight and twisty track it was no surprise to see 1987 race winner Nigel Mansell in third place in his Williams-Judd only 2/10ths from the pole. In fact, the nature of the circuit saw atmo cars line up from 3rd to 7th on the grid. The next best turbo behind the McLarens being the Ferrari of Gerhard Berger in 8th place, though the Austrian was only 1.399 slower than Senna with Nelson Piquet (Lotus-Honda) and Michele Alboreto qualifying in 10th and 11th places.

The Arrows cars struggled with Derek Warwick qualifying 17th and Eddie Cheever just scrambling onto the back row of the grid in 25th. The Arrows were in fact slower than Nicola Larini's Osella which qualified 14th.

The two Zakspeeds of Piercarlo Ghinzani and Bernd Schneider failed to qualify, as did Bailey and Oscar Larrauri in the EuroBrun. Gabriele Tarquini failed to pre-qualify his Coloni.

== Race summary ==
From the 10th all-McLaren front row of the year, Alain Prost made a good start, with the Williams of Nigel Mansell drafting past Ayrton Senna into 2nd. Ivan Capelli and Thierry Boutsen tangled, damaging the Benetton's nosecone. On lap 2, Senna passed Mansell but ran wide, allowing the Englishman to retake the lead. On lap 16, Michele Alboreto retired with engine problems on his Ferrari. For the first 28 laps there was no change amongst the top seven: Prost led Mansell by half a second, while Senna had to defend third place from Riccardo Patrese and Capelli, who in turn was being challenged by Alessandro Nannini and Gerhard Berger.

Around lap 30, Nannini, Berger and Piquet all pitted for new tyres. After trailing the Williams for the first hour of the race, and doing so without a clutch since the early laps, Capelli managed to pass Patrese for fourth on lap 36 and then Senna for third on lap 39. However, his engine failed on lap 46.

Mansell managed to keep Prost within arms length, but with a less powerful engine on the tight Jerez circuit simply could not get past, or truly close enough to the Frenchman to even attempt a passing move (in the post-race press conference, Mansell described following Prost as "Following the master" adding that Prost didn't put a foot wrong all race). On lap 47 Mansell pitted but a sticking wheel nut delayed him and enabled Prost to pull further ahead. Meanwhile, Nannini was going fast on his new tyres and had managed to pass not only the notoriously hard to pass Patrese for fourth place, but also the McLaren-Honda of Ayrton Senna for third place in one lap. Mansell's slow stop allowed Prost to pit (somewhat reluctantly as he correctly believed that his tyres were in good shape) on lap 50 without losing his lead, though he accidentally selected second gear instead of first and was slow getting away from his pit, while a lap later Senna also pitted for new tyres and actually dropped out of the points to seventh. On his new tyres, but while still keeping an eye on his fuel readout, he passed Gugelmin and Berger before finally overtaking Patrese, who drove the entire race on one set of tyres, for fourth place on lap 65.

Prost sealed his 34th career victory with a fastest lap record and Mansell gaining his 2nd second-place of the year from just two finishes. Nannini collected another podium finish ahead of Senna (troubled with fuel readout problems again, crossing the line with his readout telling him he had almost no fuel left), Patrese and Berger (almost out of fuel) in 6th.

== Classification ==
=== Pre-qualifying ===
Pos	No	Driver	Constructor	Time	Gap
1	36	(Italy) Alex Caffi	Dallara-Ford	1:28.378	
2	21	(Italy) Nicola Larini	Osella	1:29.293	+0.915
3	32	(Argentina) Oscar Larrauri	EuroBrun-Ford	1:30.003	+1.625
4	33	(Italy) Stefano Modena	EuroBrun-Ford	1:30.419	+2.041
DNPQ	31	(Italy) Gabriele Tarquini	Coloni-Ford	1:30.459	+2.081

=== Qualifying ===
Pos	No	Driver	Constructor	Q1	Q2	Gap
1	12	(Brazil) Ayrton Senna	McLaren-Honda	1:24.775	1:24.067	
2	11	(France) Alain Prost	McLaren-Honda	1:26.735	1:24.134	+0.067
3	5	(United Kingdom) Nigel Mansell	Williams-Judd	1:25.898	1:24.269	+0.202
4	20	(Belgium) Thierry Boutsen	Benetton-Ford	EX	1:24.904	+0.837
5	19	(Italy) Alessandro Nannini	Benetton-Ford	1:26.673	1:25.032	+0.965
6	16	(Italy) Ivan Capelli	March-Judd	1:26.221	1:25.115	+1.048
7	6	(Italy) Riccardo Patrese	Williams-Judd	1:27.504	1:25.217	+1.150
8	28	(Austria) Gerhard Berger	Ferrari	1:27.796	1:25.466	+1.399
9	1	(Brazil) Nelson Piquet	Lotus-Honda	1:28.015	1:25.648	+1.581
10	27	(Italy) Michele Alboreto	Ferrari	1:29.034	1:26.447	+2.380
11	15	(Brazil) Maurício Gugelmin	March-Judd	1:27.414	1:26.578	+2.511
12	30	(France) Philippe Alliot	Lola-Ford	1:27.927	1:26.832	+2.765
13	14	(France) Philippe Streiff	AGS-Ford	1:28.099	1:26.971	+2.904
14	21	(Italy) Nicola Larini	Osella	1:28.417	1:27.012	+2.945
15	2	(Japan) Satoru Nakajima	Lotus-Honda	1:28.840	1:27.171	+3.104
16	29	(France) Yannick Dalmas	Lola-Ford	1:29.688	1:27.187	+3.120
17	17	(United Kingdom) Derek Warwick	Arrows-Megatron	1:28.473	1:27.240	+3.173
18	36	(Italy) Alex Caffi	Dallara-Ford	1:27.907	1:27.350	+3.283
19	25	(France) René Arnoux	Ligier-Judd	1:29.157	1:27.351	+3.284
20	23	(Italy) Pierluigi Martini	Minardi-Ford	1:27.826	1:27.407	+3.340
21	26	(Sweden) Stefan Johansson	Ligier-Judd	1:28.009	1:27.474	+3.407
22	3	(United Kingdom) Jonathan Palmer	Tyrrell-Ford	1:27.582	1:27.548	+3.481
23	22	(Italy) Andrea de Cesaris	Rial-Ford	1:28.315	1:27.798	+3.731
24	24	(Spain) Luis Pérez-Sala	Minardi-Ford	1:28.694	1:27.833	+3.816
25	18	(United States) Eddie Cheever	Arrows-Megatron	1:29.305	1:27.859	+3.792
26	33	(Italy) Stefano Modena	EuroBrun-Ford	1:30.759	1:27.977	+3.910
DNQ	10	(West Germany) Bernd Schneider	Zakspeed	1:31.144	1:28.194	+4.127
DNQ	32	(Argentina) Oscar Larrauri	EuroBrun-Ford	1:31.366	1:28.664	+4.597
DNQ	4	(United Kingdom) Julian Bailey	Tyrrell-Ford	1:30.125	1:29.066	+4.999
DNQ	9	(Italy) Piercarlo Ghinzani	Zakspeed	1:29.824	1:29.503	+5.436

- Note: Boutsen's time from Q1 excluded as front wing end plates were 5mm longer than allowed.

=== Race ===
Pos	No	Driver	Constructor	Laps	Time/Retired	Grid	Points
1	11	(France) Alain Prost	McLaren-Honda	72	1:48:43.851	2	9
2	5	(United Kingdom) Nigel Mansell	Williams-Judd	72	+ 26.232	3	6
3	19	(Italy) Alessandro Nannini	Benetton-Ford	72	+ 35.446	5	4
4	12	(Brazil) Ayrton Senna	McLaren-Honda	72	+ 46.710	1	3
5	6	(Italy) Riccardo Patrese	Williams-Judd	72	+ 47.430	7	2
6	28	(Austria) Gerhard Berger	Ferrari	72	+ 51.813	8	1
7	15	(Brazil) Maurício Gugelmin	March-Judd	72	+ 1:15.964	11	
8	1	(Brazil) Nelson Piquet	Lotus-Honda	72	+ 1:17.309	9	
9	20	(Belgium) Thierry Boutsen	Benetton-Ford	72	+ 1:17.655	4	
10	36	(Italy) Alex Caffi	Dallara-Ford	71	+ 1 lap	18	
11	29	(France) Yannick Dalmas	Lola-Ford	71	+ 1 lap	16	
12	24	(Spain) Luis Pérez-Sala	Minardi-Ford	70	+ 2 laps	24	
13	33	(Italy) Stefano Modena	EuroBrun-Ford	70	+ 2 laps	26	
14	30	(France) Philippe Alliot	Lola-Ford	69	+ 3 laps	12	
Ret	26	(Sweden) Stefan Johansson	Ligier-Judd	62	Wheel	21	
Ret	18	(United States) Eddie Cheever	Arrows-Megatron	60	Chassis	25	
Ret	16	(Italy) Ivan Capelli	March-Judd	45	Engine	6	
Ret	17	(United Kingdom) Derek Warwick	Arrows-Megatron	41	Chassis	17	
Ret	22	(Italy) Andrea de Cesaris	Rial-Ford	37	Engine	23	
Ret	14	(France) Philippe Streiff	AGS-Ford	16	Engine	13	
Ret	27	(Italy) Michele Alboreto	Ferrari	15	Engine	10	
Ret	23	(Italy) Pierluigi Martini	Minardi-Ford	15	Gearbox	20	
Ret	2	(Japan) Satoru Nakajima	Lotus-Honda	14	Spun off	15	
Ret	21	(Italy) Nicola Larini	Osella	9	Suspension	14	
Ret	3	(United Kingdom) Jonathan Palmer	Tyrrell-Ford	4	Chassis	22	
Ret	25	(France) René Arnoux	Ligier-Judd	0	Throttle	19	
DNQ	10	(West Germany) Bernd Schneider	Zakspeed				
DNQ	32	(Argentina) Oscar Larrauri	EuroBrun-Ford				
DNQ	4	(United Kingdom) Julian Bailey	Tyrrell-Ford				
DNQ	9	(Italy) Piercarlo Ghinzani	Zakspeed				
DNPQ	31	(Italy) Gabriele Tarquini	Coloni-Ford				

== Championship standings after the race ==
- **Bold text** indicates World Champions.

Drivers' Championship standings

Pos	Driver	Points
1	(France) Alain Prost	84 (90)
2	(Brazil) Ayrton Senna	79
3	(Austria) Gerhard Berger	38
4	(Belgium) Thierry Boutsen	25
5	(Italy) Michele Alboreto	24

Constructors' Championship standings

Pos	Constructor	Points
1	(United Kingdom) **McLaren-Honda**	169
2	(Italy) Ferrari	62
3	(United Kingdom) Benetton-Ford	38
4	(United Kingdom) Arrows-Megatron	20
5	(United Kingdom) March-Judd	19

- Note: Only the top five positions are included for both sets of standings. Drivers could only count their best 11 results; numbers without parentheses are Championship points; numbers in parentheses are total points scored. Points accurate at final declaration of results. The Benettons were subsequently disqualified from the Belgian Grand Prix and their points reallocated.

Previous race: 1988 Portuguese Grand Prix	FIA Formula One World Championship; 1988 season	Next race: 1988 Japanese Grand Prix
Previous race: 1987 Spanish Grand Prix	Spanish Grand Prix	Next race: 1989 Spanish Grand Prix
