= Osella FA1L =

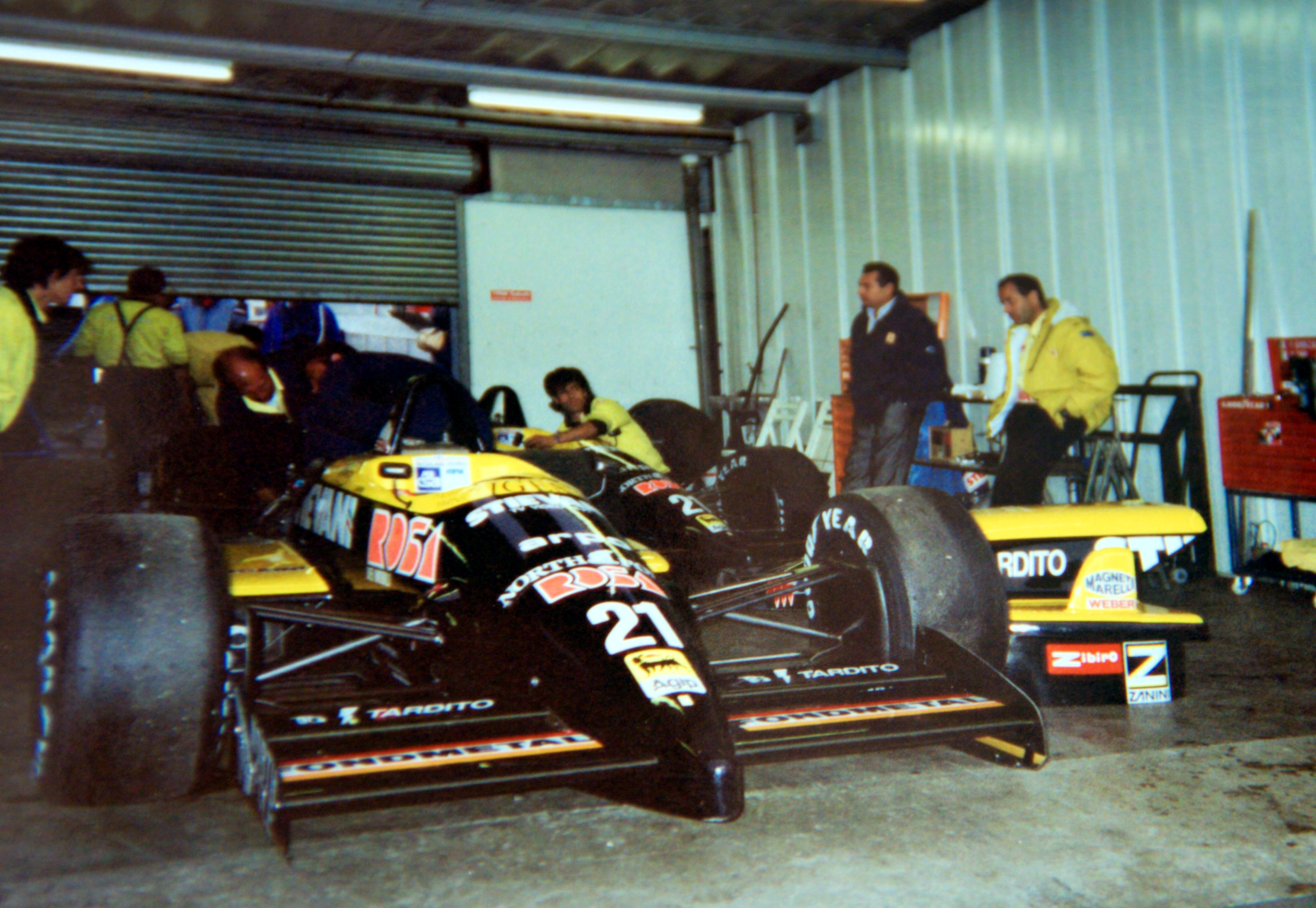
- The FA1L at the 1988 British Grand Prix
- Category: Formula One
- Constructor: Osella
- Designer: Antonio Tomaini
- Predecessor: FA1I
- Successor: FA1M

Technical specifications
- Chassis: Carbon fibre monocoque
- Suspension (front): Double wishbones, pullrods
- Suspension (rear): Double wishbones, pullrods
- Axle track: Front: 1,800 mm (71 in); Rear: 1,672 mm (65.8 in)
- Wheelbase: 2,776 mm (109.3 in)
- Engine: Osella 890T 1,497 cc (91.4 cu in), V8, turbo (2.5 Bar limited), mid-engine, longitudinally mounted
- Transmission: Hewland / Osella 6-speed manual
- Weight: 560 kg (1,230 lb)
- Fuel: Agip
- Tyres: Goodyear

Competition history
- Notable entrants: Osella Squadra Corse
- Notable drivers: 21. (Italy) Nicola Larini
- Debut: 1988 Monaco Grand Prix
Races	Wins	Poles	F/Laps
10	0	0	0
- Constructors' Championships: 0
- Drivers' Championships: 0

The Osella FA1L was a Formula One car designed by Antonio Tomaini and raced by Osella in the 1988 FIA Formula One World Championship. It was the last Osella to be powered by a turbocharged engine, the Alfa Romeo-designed 1.5-litre 890T V8, and was driven by a young Nicola Larini, who had made his F1 debut with Coloni in 1987.

== Car and engine ==
The Alfa Romeo 890T turbo engine that powered the FA1L had been introduced to Formula One in 1983. Osella had been using Alfa turbo power since 1984, but had scored only two points with the engine over five seasons when Piercarlo Ghinzani had finished fifth in the 1984 Dallas Grand Prix. The team's cars and the engine had both proved unreliable and, as a result, Fiat, the parent company of Alfa Romeo, withdrew its support for the engine, though they allowed Osella to keep using it in 1988 so long as the Alfa Romeo name was not used. This resulted in the engine being renamed the Osella 890T (or Osella V8) for the season.

The 1988 season can be seen as a dismal failure for the small Italian team owned by Enzo Osella, though Larini reported that early season testing at Monza had produced good straight-line speed and encouraging lap times. The car was heavy (560 kg (1,230 lb)) and produced excessive drag which hurt its top speed while not producing enough downforce which made it slow when cornering (like all Osella's since 1984, the FA1L had its aerodynamic origins in the Alfa Romeo 183T used by the factory Alfa team in 1983). Also, the V8 turbo engine suffered from both high fuel consumption and a lack of throttle response (turbo lag). The fuel consumption problem was one the engine had been plagued with since re-fuelling was banned in 1984. Indeed the FA1L (nicknamed "FAIL") was often hard pressed to qualify or race as fast as the 'atmo' V8 cars. While top speeds were generally the same as the slower atmo cars, the non-turbo V8's did not suffer from turbo lag and thus had better acceleration.

== Season summary ==
After using 1987's FA1I for the opening round in Brazil, the FA1L first appeared in Round 2 at the San Marino Grand Prix, but failed to pass scrutineering after it was found the team had modified the chassis, changing the fuel zone shape and then with the driver's feet illegally in front of the front axle line. New FISA safety regulations meant that all cars would be required to have the driver's feet behind (which essentially meant in line with) the front axle line. While this would be compulsory for all cars from 1989, for 1988 the rule only applied to those cars which were brand new for the season. Any older chassis just updated (e.g. the Ferrari) could still have the feet beyond the front axle line. The upshot was that the FA1L was disqualified on the basis that the changed mounting points plus the driver's feet position constituted an entirely new chassis which had not been passed in FIA crash testing.

The car was passed legal for its second race, the next round in Monaco where it would have its most successful outing. There Larini qualified 25th (second last, though out-qualifying the Lotus-Honda of Satoru Nakajima who failed to qualify), and managed to stay out of trouble to finish ninth, three laps down on race winner Alain Prost in his McLaren-Honda.

From there the rot set in for the team. The car's shortcomings were exposed at the next race in Mexico where Larini failed to qualify despite the thinner air in the high altitude of Mexico City giving the turbo powered cars an extra 20–25% horsepower advantage over their atmospheric rivals than was normal (meaning that the Osella V8 could still use most of its power while the best atmo engine, the Ford DFR used by Benetton, was only producing around 560–590 bhp). The FA1L was the only turbo car not to qualify in Mexico, blown off by even the equally struggling Zakspeed 881 turbos.

Larini only finished three races in 1988. Other than his ninth in Monaco, he was classified 19th and last at Silverstone after running out of fuel on lap 60 of the 65 lap race (highlighting the 890T's high fuel consumption), and 12th in Portugal. After scoring no points in the first half of the season to the British Grand Prix, Osella was forced into pre-qualifying. Larini failed to pre-qualify the car in both Hungary and at the final round in Australia. Rather surprisingly, the car's best qualifying performance was at the tight and twisty Jerez circuit for the Spanish Grand Prix where Larini's talent was on full display and he ended up 14th on the grid, only 2.945 seconds slower than the pole winning McLaren of Ayrton Senna.

On average, Larini and the FA1L qualified some 5.8 seconds slower than the pole winning times set during the season.

The FA1L was replaced by the FA1M for the 1989 season. As turbo power was banned by the FIA from 1989, the FA1M was powered by the naturally aspirated Ford DFR V8 engine. Although the team scored no points with the FA1M, the car did prove more competitive in the hands of the highly rated Larini and his veteran team mate Piercarlo Ghinzani.

== Complete Formula One results ==
(key)

Year	Entrant	Engine	Tyres	Drivers	1	2	3	4	5	6	7	8	9	10	11	12	13	14	15	16	Pts.	WCC
1988	Osella Squadra Corse	Osella 890T; V8 tc	G		BRA	SMR	MON	MEX	CAN	DET	FRA	GBR	GER	HUN	BEL	ITA	POR	ESP	JPN	AUS	0	NC
1988	Osella Squadra Corse	Osella 890T; V8 tc	G	Nicola Larini		DSQ	9	DNQ	DNQ	Ret	Ret	19	Ret	DNPQ	Ret	Ret	12	Ret	Ret	DNPQ	0	NC
