= 1988 San Marino Grand Prix =

- Race 2 of 16 in the 1988 Formula One World Championship
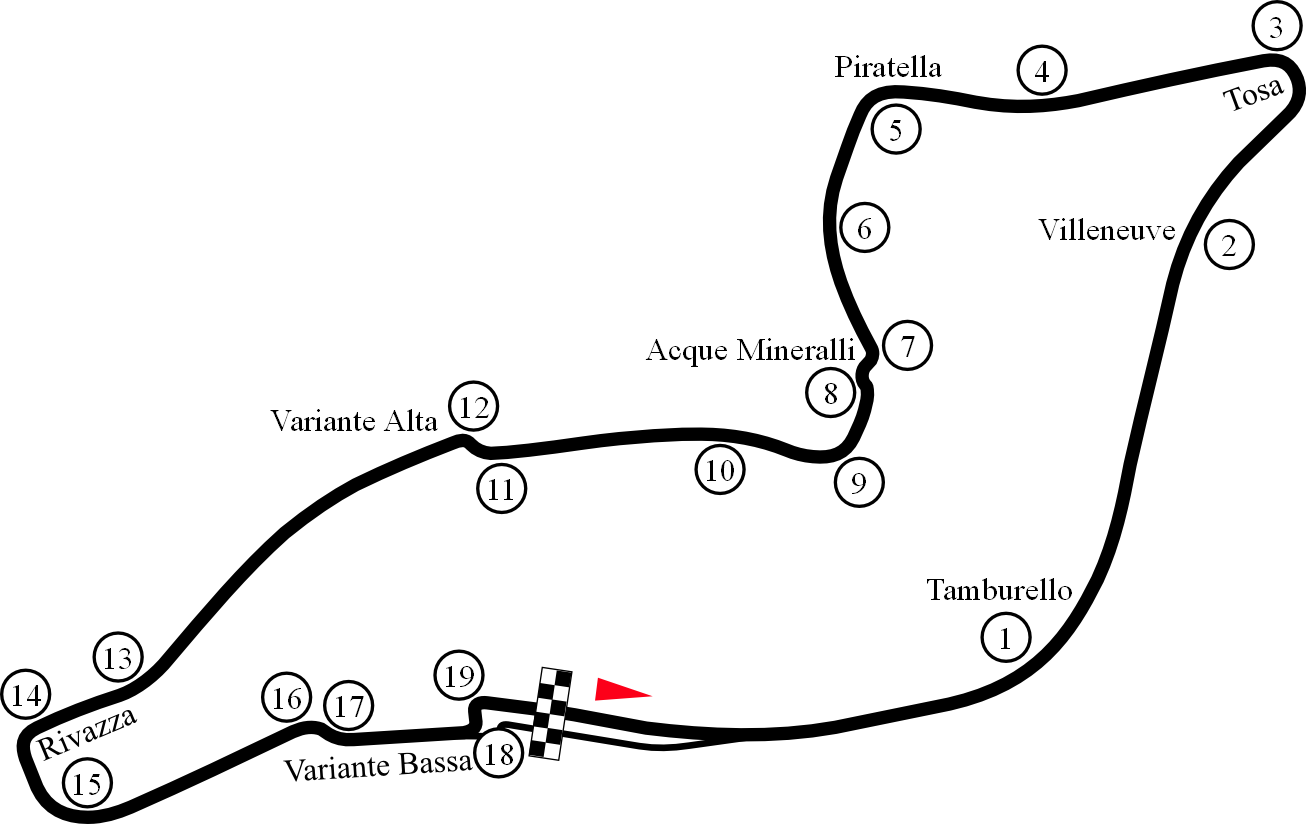

Race details
- Date: 1 May 1988
- Official name: VIII Gran Premio di San Marino
- Location: Autodromo Dino Ferrari, Imola, Emilia-Romagna, Italy
- Course: Permanent racing facility
- Course length: 5.040 km (3.131 miles)
- Distance: 60 laps, 302.4 km (187.986 miles)
- Weather: Sunny, warm

Pole position
Driver	(Brazil) Ayrton Senna	McLaren-Honda
- Time: 1:27.148

Fastest lap
Driver	(France) Alain Prost	McLaren-Honda
- Time: 1:29.685 on lap 53

Podium
First	(Brazil) Ayrton Senna	McLaren-Honda
Second	(France) Alain Prost	McLaren-Honda
Third	(Brazil) Nelson Piquet	Lotus-Honda

The 1988 San Marino Grand Prix was a Formula One motor race held at Imola on 1 May 1988. The 60-lap race was the second round of the 1988 Formula One season. Ayrton Senna scored his first victory for the McLaren team, with turbocharged Honda-powered cars sweeping the top three positions.

== Qualifying ==
The McLaren-Hondas totally dominated qualifying for the San Marino Grand Prix. Ayrton Senna and Alain Prost occupied the front row of the grid with times of 1:27.148 and 1:27.919 respectively. Their nearest challenger was the Lotus of reigning World Champion Nelson Piquet with a time of 1:30.500. All the more interesting was that Piquet's Lotus was powered by the same specification turbocharged Honda engine that powered the McLarens and he was as fast as them through the speed trap on the run to Tosa, yet he was over 3 seconds slower than Senna. The difference was that the lowline McLaren MP4/4's were untouchable under acceleration and they had superior grip to any other car on the grid.

Amazingly, considering the team's success in its Formula One history dating back to 1966, this was only the third time that there was an all-McLaren front row for a Grand Prix. The other two times had been at the 1972 Canadian Grand Prix (Peter Revson and Denny Hulme) and the 1986 German Grand Prix (Keke Rosberg and Alain Prost).

Not including the last two races of 1987 that he missed through injury, Nigel Mansell missed qualifying on the front row of the grid for the first time since the 1986 Mexican Grand Prix. He qualified his Williams-Judd in 11th place, five places behind teammate Riccardo Patrese in 6th. The fastest atmo car in qualifying was the Benetton-Ford of Alessandro Nannini who ended up 4th on the grid in front of the disappointing Ferrari of Gerhard Berger who, along with teammate Michele Alboreto (who qualified 10th, almost 4.5 seconds slower than Senna), found the turbocharged Italian V6 engines down on power throughout.

The claims of Berger and Alboreto were backed up by the speed trap figures. The fastest car on the long run to Tosa was the Lotus-Honda of Piquet timed at just over 302 km/h (188 mph) (1.5 km/h faster than the McLarens). The Ferraris were much slower at 293 km/h (182 mph), and were some 16 km/h (10 mph) slower than the McLarens over the start-finish line (McLaren were fastest there at almost 250 km/h (155 mph). In fact, both Ferraris were almost 5 km/h (3 mph) slower over the start line than the atmospheric Benettons (who were also the fastest of the atmos at Tosa with 292 km/h (181 mph)) and were also slower at the start/finish line than the Zakspeeds, showing just how much trouble they were in.

One of the surprises of qualifying was American veteran Eddie Cheever. Not noted as the best qualifier, Cheever qualified 8th in his Arrows-Megatron, though he was still 4.1 seconds behind Senna. Cheever and Arrows had tested at Imola a week before the race and came up with a set-up they liked. The same settings were put on Derek Warwick's Arrows but the Briton admitted he found the settings lazy and could only qualify 14th, 1.2 seconds slower than his teammate. The turbocharged Arrows', with Cheever and Warwick still hampered by the pop-off valve cutting in early, were touching just under 295 km/h (183 mph) on the run to Tosa to make them the fastest behind the Honda powered cars.

The EuroBrun-Ford Cosworth of Oscar Larrauri, the Ligier-Judds of Stefan Johansson and former Imola pole winner René Arnoux, and the Zakspeed turbo of Bernd Schneider all failed to qualify, while the Osella of Italian Nicola Larini was excluded after scrutineering when it was discovered that the car's engine mounting points had been illegally changed. The scrutineers ruled that this constituted an entirely new chassis for the Osella FA1L and as the new chassis had not yet been crash approved by FISA, the team was excluded from the meeting. For Ligier it was the first time since the team's début in Formula One in 1976 that neither car had qualified for a race. For Arnoux it was a bitter pill to swallow as he had sat on the pole at the circuit three times previously when he had driven for both Renault (1980 and 1982) and Ferrari (1983). Johansson, driving for Ferrari (1985 and 1986) and McLaren the previous year, had finished each race in the points.

After qualifying, Lotus team boss Peter Warr and lead driver Nelson Piquet made the claim that despite the three second gap between the McLarens and the rest of the field, they believed the Lotus and even the Ferraris were better aerodynamically than the McLarens and that would hurt their fuel consumption on what was one of the most fuel thirsty circuits on the calendar. Warr predicted the McLarens would not be able to maintain their advantage and still finish the race on their 150-litre fuel limit. Not for the first time, or the last, his public predictions would prove to be wrong.

== Race summary ==
The McLaren of Ayrton Senna led from the start, whilst his teammate Alain Prost had his engine stall coming to take his place on the grid (Prost later reported that the engine had also stalled earlier on the parade lap). The car was still rolling so he bump started it but it almost stalled again as the race started and he dropped to 7th place behind the Arrows of Eddie Cheever. Whilst he was able to recover these places and get back to second place by lap 8, he could not catch Senna who controlled the gap according to the traffic. Maintaining a lead of 6–10 seconds, Senna slowed on the last lap to make sure he finished without running out of fuel which reduced the gap to the pursuing Prost to just 2.3 seconds at the line. Prost later admitted he had turned up his turbo boost in his fight up to second and although still lapping quicker than most of the field, he was then forced to conserve for the rest of the race for fear of running dry before the end.

Nelson Piquet battled with an ill-handling Lotus but used superior Honda power to maintain 3rd place ahead of a train of cars including both Benettons, both Williams and Berger's Ferrari. He was lucky to make it to the finish line as the extra boost needed to keep his position cut severely into his fuel. Had he not been lapped only four laps from the finish (meaning he only had to complete three of the remaining laps), he might not have had enough fuel to complete his last lap.

Nigel Mansell made a superb drive from a poor 11th place on the grid to be briefly up to 3rd place after taking Piquet under braking for the Rivazza on lap 40. However, as soon as Mansell got past the Lotus, blue oil smoke started to appear from the back of his Williams and less than a lap later Piquet again used his Honda's superior power to slipstream Mansell through the Tamburello and re-take 3rd through Villeneuve. However fleeting the move was, Mansell would retire just a lap after dropping to 4th with a faulty voltage regulator.

Thierry Boutsen's Benetton came home in 4th ahead of Gerhard Berger in the Ferrari, though late in the race he was hampered by a down on power engine thanks to a cracked exhaust on his car, and rounding out the points was his teammate Alessandro Nannini. Nannini had been fighting for 3rd place with Piquet, but despite being consistently quicker in the corners, he had to yield to superior Honda power on the straights. Piquet and Nannini banged wheels at the Tosa hairpin, and a couple of laps later the Italian lost 4th place to his teammate after another wheel banging dual with the reigning World Champion caused him to spin at Tosa. Nannini dropped to 7th with Boutsen, delayed 2 seconds by Nannini's spin, now charging after Piquet. A fired up Nannini then put in the fastest atmospheric lap in a climb back into the points and 5th place. Nannini had to settle for 6th though after being passed on the last lap at the Acqua Minerale chicane by a grass-cutting Gerhard Berger, now charging thanks to being lapped and having to drive one less lap on fuel. Some were surprised that Berger wasn't penalised for the move and while Ferrari team boss Marco Piccinini claimed it was necessary for Berger to avoid a crash with Nannini, television replays suggested otherwise.

Both Senna and Prost recorded a fastest race lap faster than Nelson Piquet's qualifying time and both McLaren drivers had lapped the entire field up to and including Piquet in 3rd place by lap 56 of the 60 lap race. That was actually good news for Piquet and Berger in their turbo powered cars against the atmospheric Benettons as it meant they had to do one less race lap on their allowed fuel and could push harder for the final three laps of the race. Prost's second place earned him 6 points which saw him surpass his 1984 and 1985 McLaren teammate Niki Lauda as the all-time career points leader, with 421.5 to Lauda's 420.5 points.

In what had become standard practice at McLaren since Prost's disqualification for being 2 kg underweight at the 1985 San Marino Grand Prix, both McLarens stopped within metres of taking the chequered flag. Prost had started the last lap some 7 seconds behind his teammate but was only 2.334 behind at the flag as Senna had driven only as fast as he needed to both win and conserve fuel at what was traditionally one of the most fuel thirsty circuits on the Formula One calendar.

Surprisingly given that in previous years numerous drivers of turbo powered cars had failed to finish a race at San Marino due to running out of fuel and that the 1988 fuel limit of 150 litres was 45 less than in 1986-1987, and 70 less than the 1984-1985 limit, no turbo runner ran out of fuel at Imola in 1988. The only turbo starter to not finish was the Ferrari of local hero Michele Alboreto, who was classified as 18th and last despite suffering engine failure on lap 54. This was his second engine failure of the day after his Ferrari also blew up in the morning warm-up session forcing him into the spare car for the race. He was also forced to start from the rear of the field after stalling his engine as the field went away on the warm-up lap.

== Classification ==
=== Qualifying ===
Pos	No	Driver	Constructor	Q1	Q2	Gap
1	12	(Brazil) Ayrton Senna	McLaren-Honda	1:41.278	1:27.148	—
2	11	(France) Alain Prost	McLaren-Honda	1:41.597	1:27.919	+0.771
3	1	(Brazil) Nelson Piquet	Lotus-Honda	1:44.806	1:30.500	+3.352
4	19	(Italy) Alessandro Nannini	Benetton-Ford	1:45.090	1:30.590	+3.442
5	28	(Austria) Gerhard Berger	Ferrari	1:43.394	1:30.683	+3.535
6	6	(Italy) Riccardo Patrese	Williams-Judd	1:45.673	1:30.952	+3.804
7	18	(United States) Eddie Cheever	Arrows-Megatron	1:48.399	1:31.300	+4.152
8	20	(Belgium) Thierry Boutsen	Benetton-Ford	no time	1:31.414	+3.993
9	16	(Italy) Ivan Capelli	March-Judd	1:47.518	1:31.519	+4.371
10	27	(Italy) Michele Alboreto	Ferrari	1:45.982	1:31.520	+4.372
11	5	(United Kingdom) Nigel Mansell	Williams-Judd	1:45.616	1:31.635	+4.487
12	2	(Japan) Satoru Nakajima	Lotus-Honda	1:47.399	1:31.647	+4.499
13	14	(France) Philippe Streiff	AGS-Ford	1:47.465	1:32.013	+4.865
14	17	(United Kingdom) Derek Warwick	Arrows-Megatron	1:49.081	1:32.483	+5.335
15	30	(France) Philippe Alliot	Lola-Ford	1:47.215	1:32.712	+5.564
16	22	(Italy) Andrea de Cesaris	Rial-Ford	no time	1:33.037	+5.889
17	31	(Italy) Gabriele Tarquini	Coloni-Ford	1:48.146	1:33.236	+6.088
18	24	(Spain) Luis Pérez-Sala	Minardi-Ford	1:49.211	1:33.239	+6.091
19	29	(France) Yannick Dalmas	Lola-Ford	1:46.062	1:33.374	+6.226
20	15	(Brazil) Maurício Gugelmin	March-Judd	1:49.306	1:33.448	+6.300
21	4	(United Kingdom) Julian Bailey	Tyrrell-Ford	no time	1:33.874	+6.726
22	23	(Spain) Adrian Campos	Minardi-Ford	1:49.012	1:33.903	+6.755
23	3	(United Kingdom) Jonathan Palmer	Tyrrell-Ford	1:47.265	1:33.972	+6.824
24	36	(Italy) Alex Caffi	Dallara-Ford	1:48.156	1:34.204	+7.056
25	9	(Italy) Piercarlo Ghinzani	Zakspeed	1:48.463	1:34.567	+7.419
26	33	(Italy) Stefano Modena	EuroBrun-Ford	1:48.466	1:34.782	+7.634
DNQ	32	(Argentina) Oscar Larrauri	EuroBrun-Ford	1:54.566	1:35.077	+7.929
DNQ	26	(Sweden) Stefan Johansson	Ligier-Judd	1:43.633	1:35.654	+8.506
DNQ	25	(France) René Arnoux	Ligier-Judd	1:49.054	1:36.123	+8.975
DNQ	10	(West Germany) Bernd Schneider	Zakspeed	1:51.498	1:36.218	+9.070
EX	21	(Italy) Nicola Larini	Osella			

=== Race ===
Pos	No	Driver	Constructor	Laps	Time/Retired	Grid	Points
1	12	(Brazil) Ayrton Senna	McLaren-Honda	60	1:32:41.264	1	9
2	11	(France) Alain Prost	McLaren-Honda	60	+ 2.334	2	6
3	1	(Brazil) Nelson Piquet	Lotus-Honda	59	+ 1 lap	3	4
4	20	(Belgium) Thierry Boutsen	Benetton-Ford	59	+ 1 lap	8	3
5	28	(Austria) Gerhard Berger	Ferrari	59	+ 1 lap	5	2
6	19	(Italy) Alessandro Nannini	Benetton-Ford	59	+ 1 lap	4	1
7	18	(United States) Eddie Cheever	Arrows-Megatron	59	+ 1 lap	7	
8	2	(Japan) Satoru Nakajima	Lotus-Honda	59	+ 1 lap	12	
9	17	(United Kingdom) Derek Warwick	Arrows-Megatron	58	+ 2 laps	14	
10	14	(France) Philippe Streiff	AGS-Ford	58	+ 2 laps	13	
11	24	(Spain) Luis Pérez-Sala	Minardi-Ford	58	+ 2 laps	18	
12	29	(France) Yannick Dalmas	Lola-Ford	58	+ 2 laps	19	
13	6	(Italy) Riccardo Patrese	Williams-Judd	58	+ 2 laps	6	
14	3	(United Kingdom) Jonathan Palmer	Tyrrell-Ford	58	+ 2 laps	23	
15	15	(Brazil) Maurício Gugelmin	March-Judd	58	+ 2 laps	20	
16	23	(Spain) Adrián Campos	Minardi-Ford	57	+ 3 laps	22	
17	30	(France) Philippe Alliot	Lola-Ford	57	+ 3 laps	15	
18	27	(Italy) Michele Alboreto	Ferrari	54	Engine	10	
NC	33	(Italy) Stefano Modena	EuroBrun-Ford	52	+ 8 laps	26	
Ret	4	(United Kingdom) Julian Bailey	Tyrrell-Ford	48	Gearbox	21	
Ret	5	(United Kingdom) Nigel Mansell	Williams-Judd	42	Engine	11	
Ret	31	(Italy) Gabriele Tarquini	Coloni-Ford	40	Fuel system	17	
Ret	36	(Italy) Alex Caffi	Dallara-Ford	18	Gearbox	24	
Ret	9	(Italy) Piercarlo Ghinzani	Zakspeed	16	Gearbox	25	
Ret	16	(Italy) Ivan Capelli	March-Judd	2	Gearbox	9	
Ret	22	(Italy) Andrea de Cesaris	Rial-Ford	1	Suspension	16	
DNQ	32	(Argentina) Oscar Larrauri	EuroBrun-Ford				
DNQ	26	(Sweden) Stefan Johansson	Ligier-Judd				
DNQ	25	(France) René Arnoux	Ligier-Judd				
DNQ	10	(West Germany) Bernd Schneider	Zakspeed				
EX	21	(Italy) Nicola Larini	Osella		Failed scrutineering		

== Championship standings after the race ==
Drivers' Championship standings

Pos	Driver	Points
1	(France) Alain Prost	15
2	(Brazil) Ayrton Senna	9
3	(Austria) Gerhard Berger	8
4	(Brazil) Nelson Piquet	8
5	(United Kingdom) Derek Warwick	3

Constructors' Championship standings

Pos	Constructor	Points
1	(United Kingdom) McLaren-Honda	24
2	(Italy) Ferrari	10
3	(United Kingdom) Lotus-Honda	9
4	(United Kingdom) Benetton-Ford	4
5	(United Kingdom) Arrows-Megatron	3

- Note: Only the top five positions are included for both sets of standings.

Previous race: 1988 Brazilian Grand Prix	FIA Formula One World Championship; 1988 season	Next race: 1988 Monaco Grand Prix
Previous race: 1987 San Marino Grand Prix	San Marino Grand Prix	Next race: 1989 San Marino Grand Prix
