= Osella =

Italian racing car manufacturer and Formula One team

(Italy) Osella
- Full name: Osella Squadra Corse
- Base: Verolengo, Italy
- Founder(s): Enzo Osella
- Noted drivers: (United States) Eddie Cheever (Italy) Piercarlo Ghinzani (France) Jean-Pierre Jarier (Austria) Jo Gartner (Netherlands) Huub Rothengatter (Italy) Nicola Larini (Italy) Riccardo Paletti
- Next name: Fondmetal

Formula One World Championship career
- First entry: 1980 Argentine Grand Prix
- Races entered: 172 (132 starts)
- Engines: Ford-Cosworth, Alfa Romeo, Osella
- Constructors' Championships: 0 (best finish: 12th, 1984)
- Drivers' Championships: 0 (best finish: 19th, Piercarlo Ghinzani, 1984)
- Race victories: 0 (best finish: 4th, 1982 San Marino Grand Prix)
- Points: 5
- Pole positions: 0 (best grid position: 8th, 1990 United States Grand Prix)
- Fastest laps: 0
- Final entry: 1990 Australian Grand Prix

Osella is an Italian racing car manufacturer and former Formula One team. They participated in 132 Grands Prix between 1980 and 1990. They achieved two points finishes and scored five world championship points.

== Early days ==
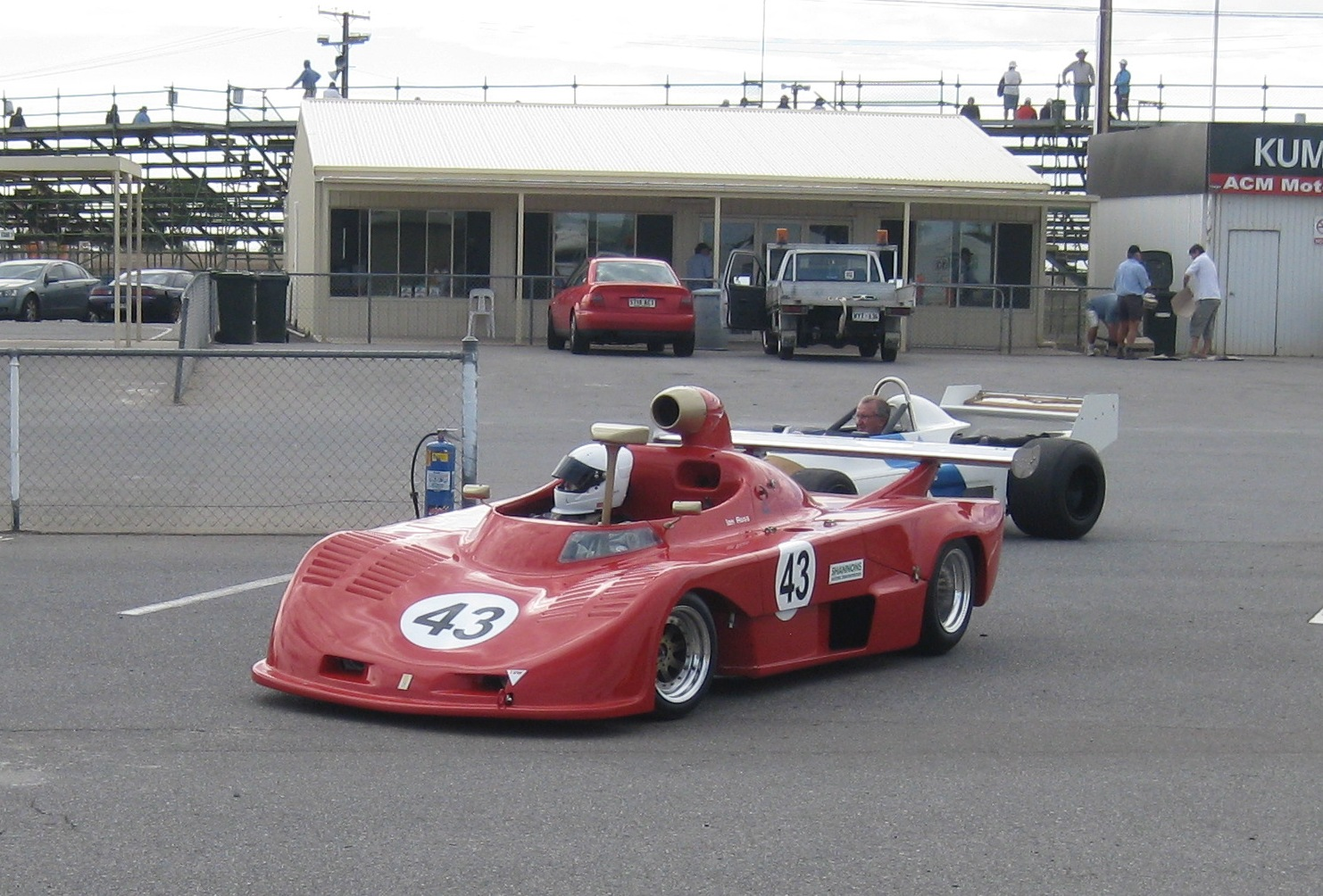
Osella placed second in the 1977 World Championship for Sports Cars with the Osella PA5 BMW.

Osella was founded in Volpiano in 1965 by former rally driver Enzo Osella. The team began life by racing Abarth sports cars among local and national races in Italy since 1965. In 1974, Osella took over the factory Abarth sports car program and expanded into single-seater racing. In 1975, the team entered the European Formula Two Championship with Giorgio Francia and Duilio Truffo, achieving some success with its own car, the BMW-powered Osella FA2.

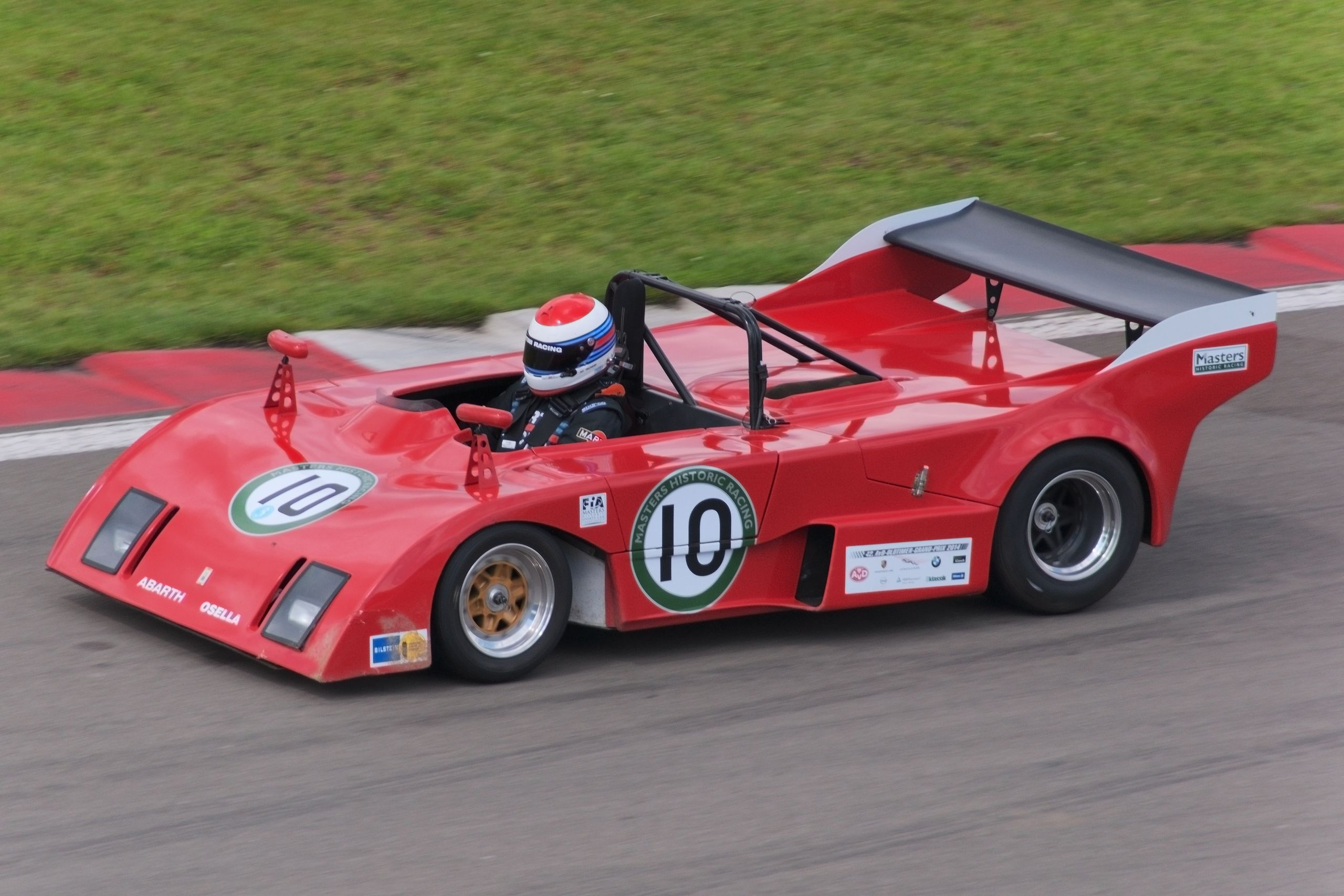
Abarth-powered Osella PA1

Osella continued in Formula Two the following season, but financial problems meant that the team was not competitive and withdrew from the championship before the end of the season. In the following years, the FA2s were occasionally entered by privateers, one of them being the Swiss touring car driver Charly Kiser. The experience prompted Osella to try to become a manufacturer for other teams. The Osella FA3 Formula Three car, powered with Toyota or Lancia engines, competed in the 1976 German and Italian F3 championships without making any great impression. After this, the team concentrated on running in local sports car events during 1977 and 1978.

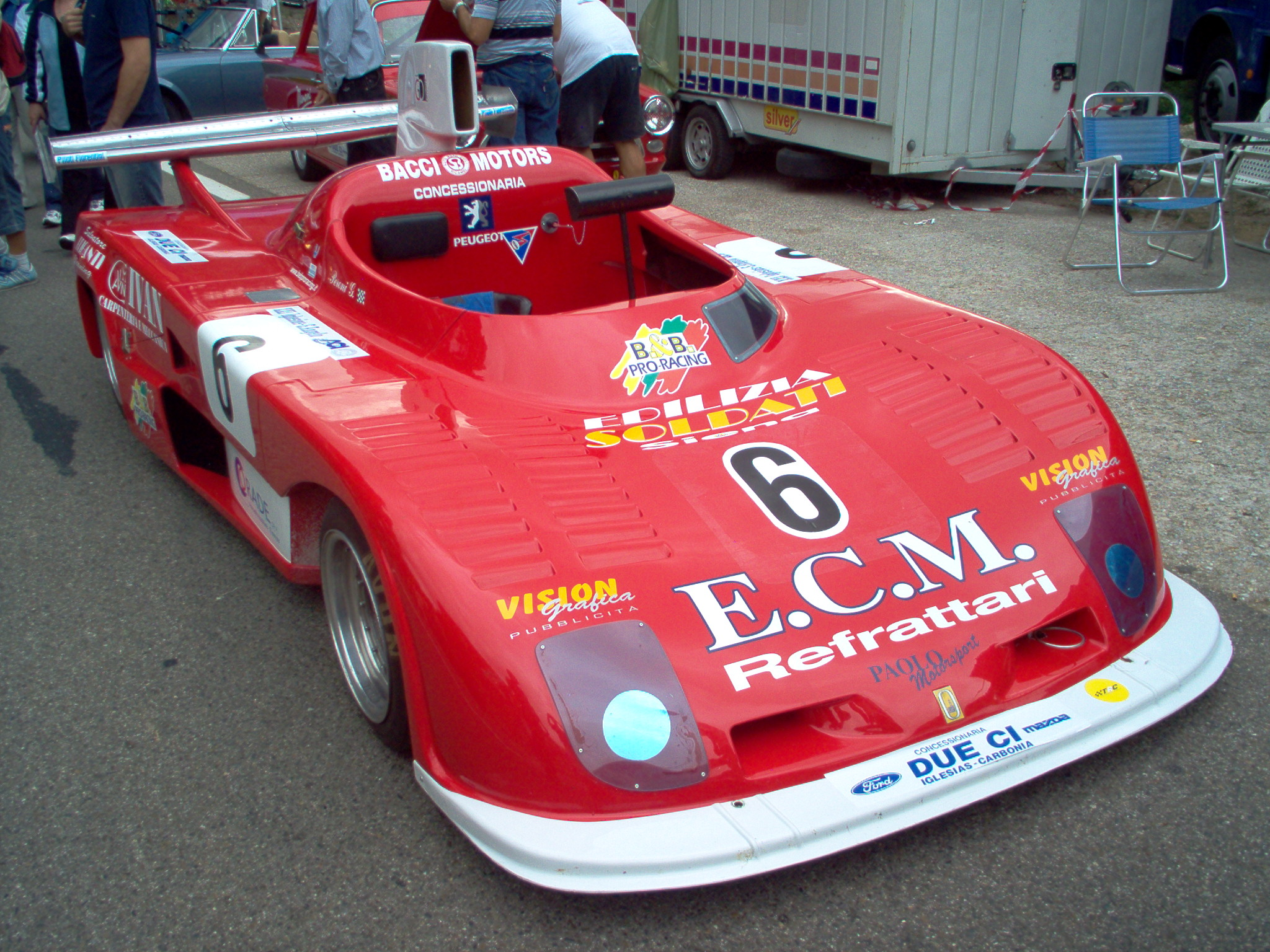
BMW-powered Osella PA3

== Return to Formula Two ==
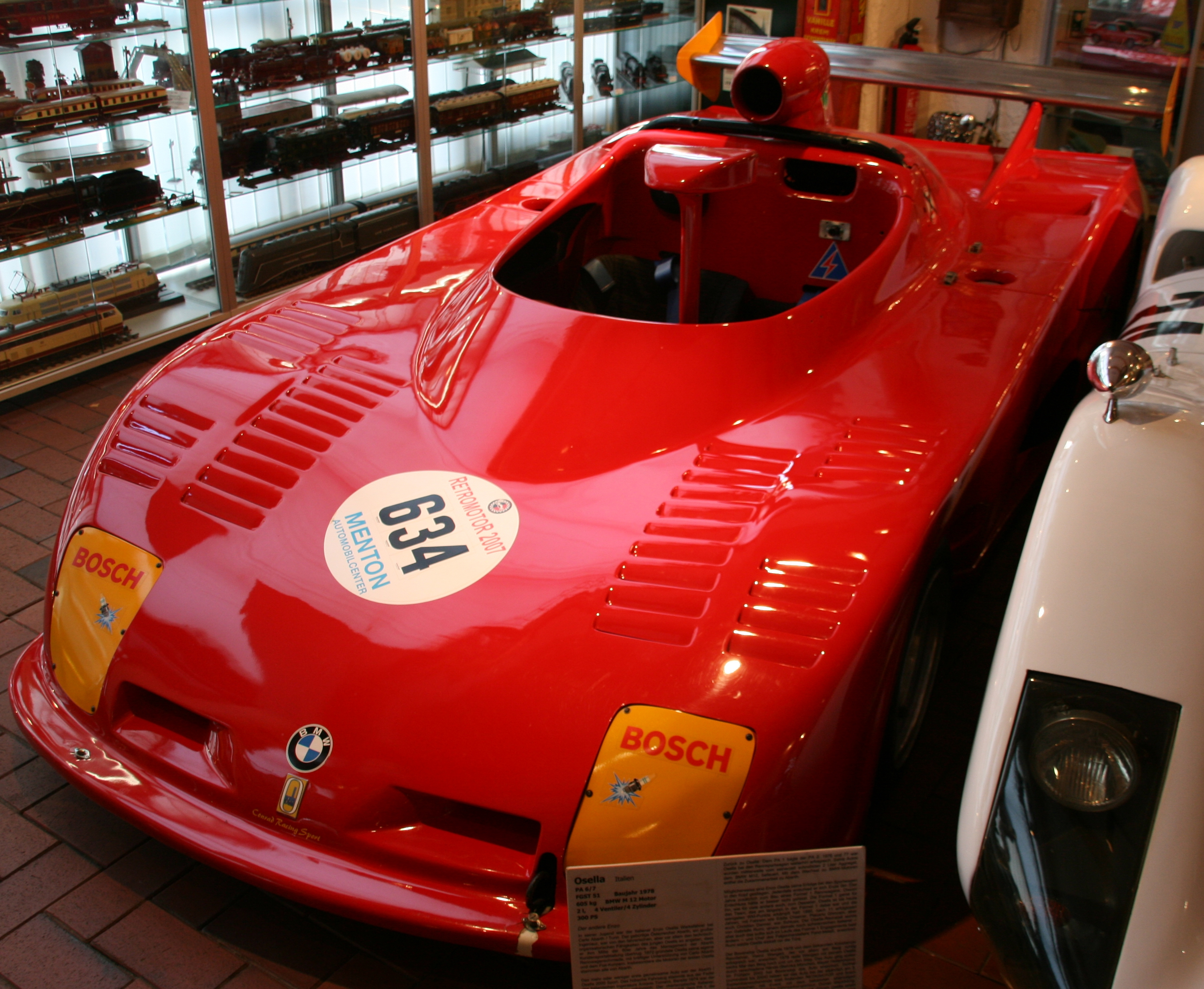
BMW-powered Osella PA6/7

Osella returned to the European Formula Two Championship in 1979, with American driver Eddie Cheever racing the well-used FA2, again powered by a BMW engine. The car was good enough to win three races and take Cheever to fourth in the championship. After securing the sponsorship of the Ente Tabacchi Italiani tobacco company via their flagship brand MS, Enzo Osella decided to upgrade his activities to Formula One.

== Formula One ==
Osella's first Formula One car, the FA1, was designed by Giorgio Stirano. Powered by Ford Cosworth DFV, the car was presented in a black and white livery with large Denim branding on the sidepods. After a difficult beginning to the 1980 season, Eddie Cheever was able to qualify regularly but finished just one race in the whole season. The car suffered from unreliability problems and was aerodynamically inefficient. Many components were manufactured in-house – a strategy that although financially viable, often resulted in poorly designed material.

For the 1982 season, Osella fielded two cars, one for Jean-Pierre Jarier and one for Riccardo Paletti. The team hired Giorgio Valentini and Tony Southgate to design a new car, with input from Enzo Osella himself. Most of these attempts brought little improvement as high-tech solutions could not be financed. Jarier finished fourth at Imola in 1982 (where only 14 cars started) and scored the first Championship points for the young team in a car that was by now dubbed Osella FA1C. Towards the end of the season tragedy struck, when Riccardo Paletti was killed in a start-line accident at the 1982 Canadian Grand Prix.

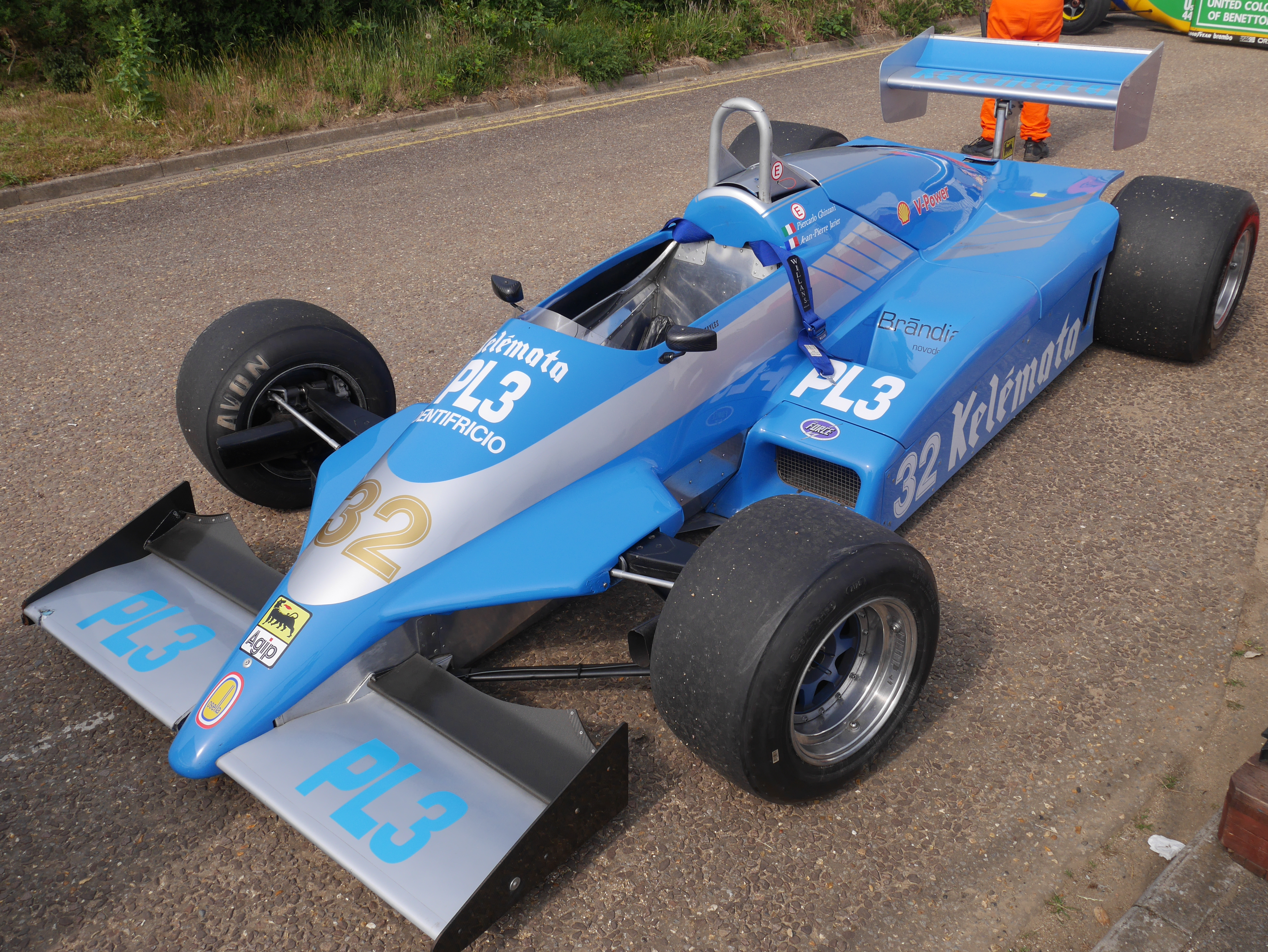
The Osella FA1D at Bournemouth in 2016

In 1983 the team regrouped, and hired Piercarlo Ghinzani and Teo Fabi's younger brother Corrado Fabi, who had just won the Formula Two European championship. Lack of funding and reliability issues prevented the drivers to qualify for many of the events on the calendar, Fabi's 10th place at the Deutch Grand Prix the best result of the season. For 1984 Osella retained Ghinzani and gave the second car to the young Austrian Jo Gartner. Ghinzani was able to score points when he finished fifth at the 1984 Dallas Grand Prix. Gardner finished fifth at Monza but both him and countryman Gerhard Berger, who had finished sixth on ATS, didn't receive any points as their teams at the beginning of the season had only officially entered one car. For the 1985 season, Ghinzani was paired with Huub Rothengatter but none of the two were able to score any points. In 1986, in order to stay afloat, the team started asking their drivers to bring sponsorship. Whilst some of the drivers who started their F1 careers with the team would go on to have respectable careers, such as Alex Caffi and Gabriele Tarquini, others disappeared as quickly as they had come, such as Allen Berg and Franco Forini. None of these drivers were able to push the team forward, and Osella continued with little or no improvement in competitiveness.

=== Partnership with Alfa Romeo ===
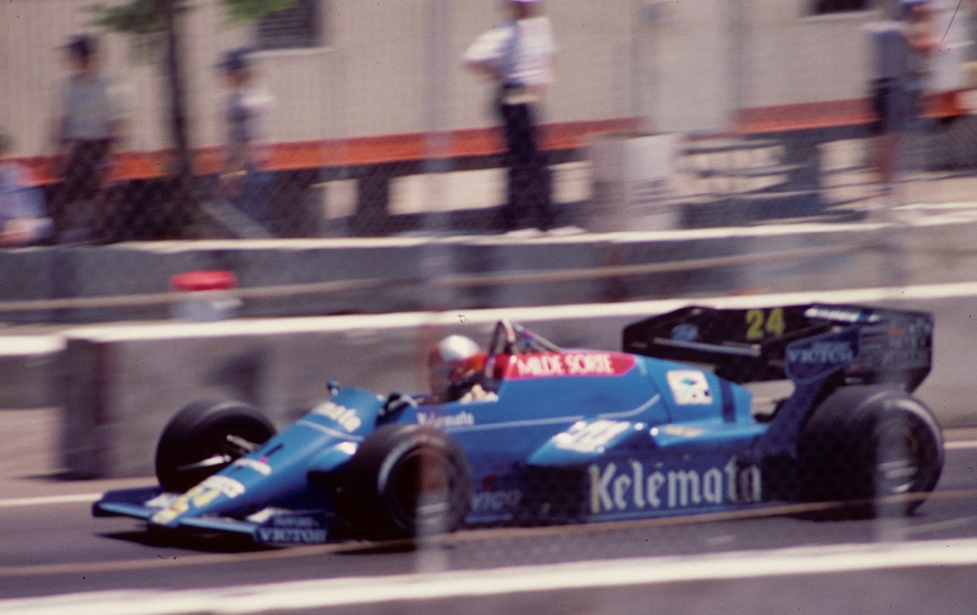
Alfa-Romeo derived FA1F at the 1984 Dallas Grand Prix, where Ghinzani achieved Osella's second and last points finish

In the mid-1980s, Osella was the beneficiary of factory Alfa Romeo engines, both in naturally-aspirated (1983–84) and turbo (1984–88) forms. The Alfa engine program helped the team to survive the increasingly professional turbo era but it failed to improve its competitiveness. The Alfa turbo engine, the 890T, was not reliable. Turbos blew up regularly and power output had to be reduced down to the level of the non-turbo cars just to achieve the necessary reliability. Alfa Romeo's chief designer, Carlo Chiti, offered some technical input to the team. Beginning with the 1984 Osella FA1F, which was based on the 1983 works Alfa Romeo 183T, all the following Osella models up to the FA1L in 1988 had their origins in the initial Alfa design.

For 1988 – the last year before turbos were banned – the team re-branded the 890T as the "Osella V8". This came about after Alfa's parent company, Fiat, grew tired of the negative publicity the team had given the 890T and, while allowing them to continue using the engine, refused to allow the Alfa Romeo name to be used.

After driver Nicola Larini managed some impressive times in pre-season testing at Monza, the team were quietly confident of a decent showing through 1988, as many teams had switched to naturally-aspirated engines in preparation for 1989. However, the Osella FA1L, with its outdated turbo, was not up to the challenge. Larini often failed to qualify or even pre-qualify, and was also excluded from the San Marino Grand Prix before practice after failing to get through scrutineering due to illegal changes made to the chassis. At the end of the season, Enzo Osella terminated his agreement with Alfa Romeo.

=== Cosworth power and Fondmetal ===
The 1989 season saw some improvement. The all-new, Cosworth DFR-powered Osella FA1M performed better in the qualifying sessions (most notably in the Japanese Grand Prix, where Larini qualified 10th). The fine qualifying performance, however, didn't translate into good results in the races. The cars rarely saw the finish line due to several technical failures. The most frustrating race was the Canadian Grand Prix, where Larini had climbed to third during the race but retired when the FA1M's electrics failed due to water ingress. At the end of the season, on the occasion of the Australian Grand Prix, Ghinzani suffered a high-speed collision with the Lotus of Nelson Piquet, leaving him with an injured ankle. Right after, Ghinzani announced his retirement.

In 1990, Enzo Osella sold shares in his team to metalwork magnate Gabriele Rumi, as part of a sponsorship deal with Rumi's Fondmetal company. During 1990, the team entered a single car for French driver Olivier Grouillard. At the end of 1990, Rumi took over the remainder of the team and renamed it Fondmetal. The involvement of Rumi meant the end of Osella's activities in Formula One.

== Sportscars ==
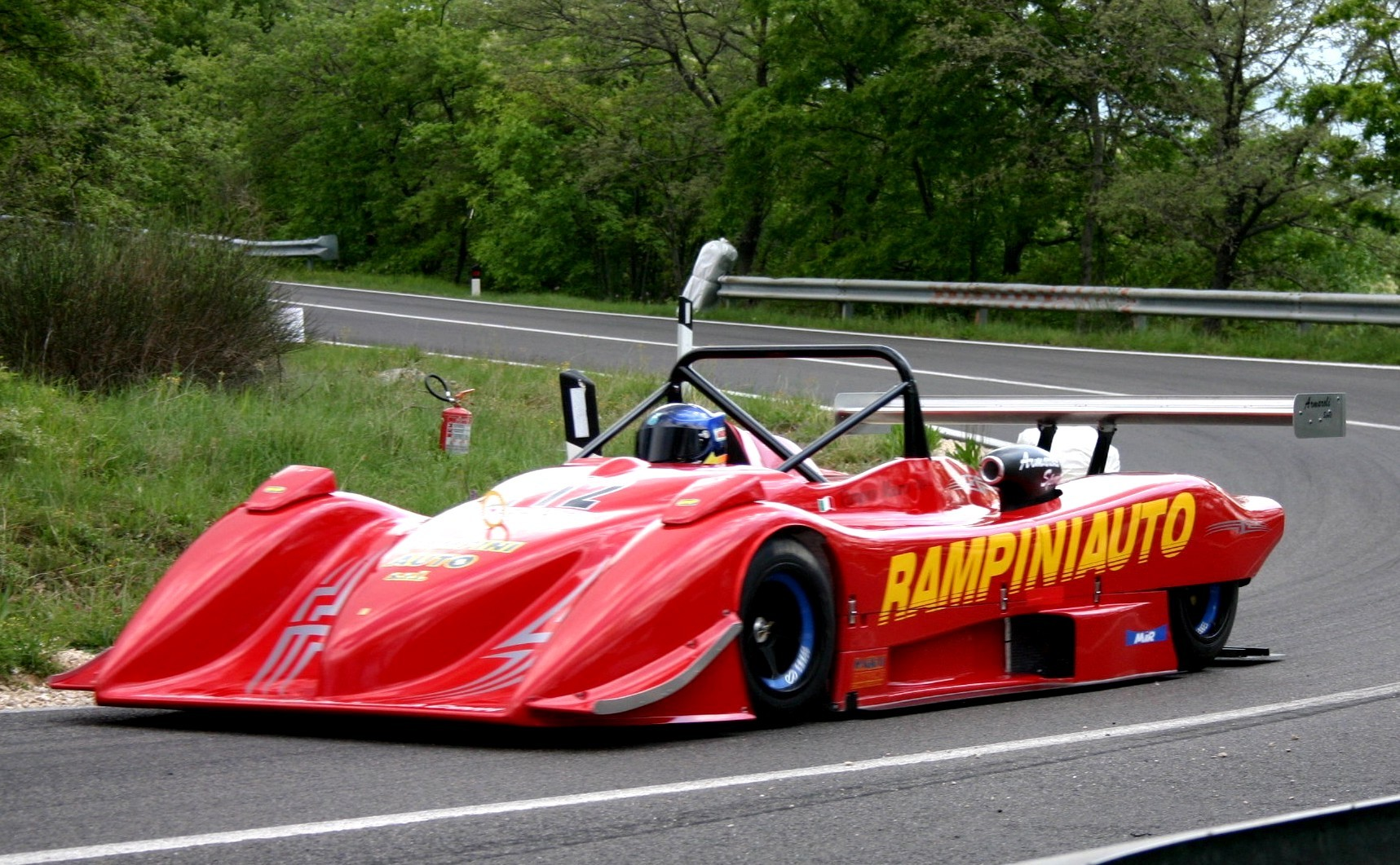
BMW-powered Osella PA20

Parallel his Formula One years, Enzo Osella had built sports cars. These were often regularly deployed in hillclimb races, with Mauro Nesti many times winner of European and Italian Championship, and many other drivers, with Osella PA9 and Osella PA9/90 models.

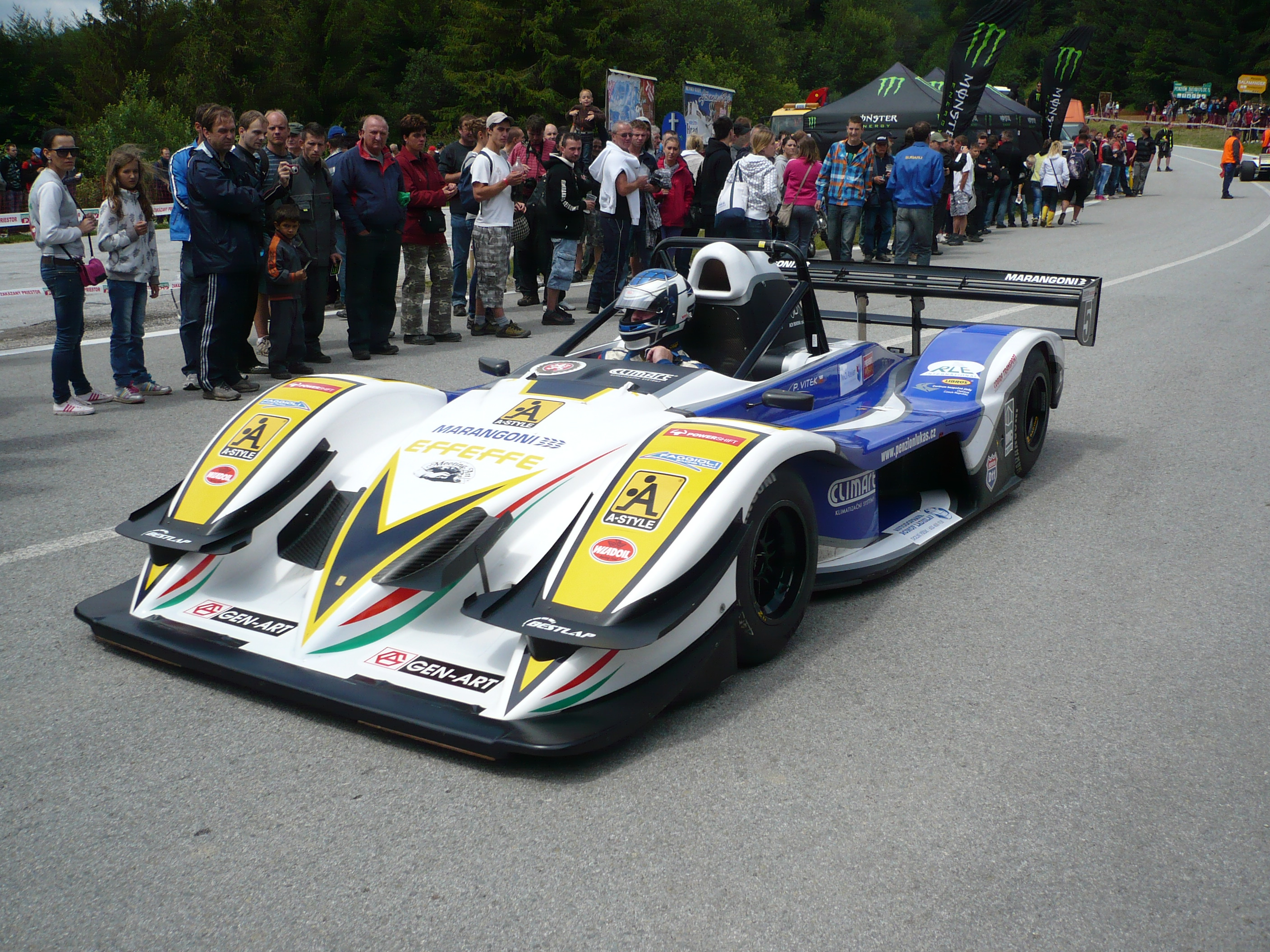
Osella PA30

A few Osella sports cars found their way to the Can Am series, although without much success. The most prestigious result was during the 1984 Can Am season with a third place in the championship for the 2-litre class; the car was the Osella PA10 driven by Armando Trentini, and was the only two-seater in the championship; the rest of the 2-litre class field comprised single-seater F2 cars with covered wheels.

In the 1990s, Osella moved to Atella in the south of Italy where he built a new ultra-modern facility to produce some very competitive sports cars. Many of them were sold to privateers, while others were entered in several classes by the Osella works team. The works team was once again particularly successful in hillclimb races. In 1995 Osella works team driver Pasquale Irlando won all 9 races of the European Hillclimb Championship using the Osella PA20. He won the title in 1997, 1998 and 1999 consecutively. His successor Fabio Danti died in one of Osella's cars when he was competing in the 2000 Championship. Hillclimb stars like Franz Tschager and Martin Krisam continue to use Osella cars. In 2001 the factory was transferred back near Turin, in Verolengo, and continued activity building sport cars for hill climbing and minor sport race championship.

At the end of 2022, Osella Motorsports LTD merged with Osella Engineering. Under the joint leadership of Enzo Osella and Giuseppe Angiulli, the company, now known as Osella corse, produced cars such as the PA21 JrB from the E2B class, that could be equipped with motorcycling propellers from 1000 to 1600 cc., with a set-up both for hill climbing and track. This new collaboration, according to Osella, "breathed life into Osella and also into the spirit that has been driving the team".

Osella also participated in the Cronoscalata Monte Erice, having won the race various times.

== Racing record ==
=== Complete Formula Two results ===
(key)

Year	Chassis	Engine	Drivers	1	2	3	4	5	6	7	8	9	10	11	12	13	14
1974	Osella PA2	BMW		BAR	HOC	PAU	SAL	HOC	MUG	KAR	PER	HOC	VAL				
1974	Osella PA2	BMW	(Italy) Arturo Merzario										Ret				
1975	Osella FA2; March 742	BMW		EST	THR	HOC	NÜR	PAU	HOC	SAL	ROU	MUG	PER	SIL	ZOL	NOG	VAL
1975	Osella FA2; March 742	BMW	(Italy) Giorgio Francia	4	10	5	6	Ret	5	5	DNS		4	9	5	Ret	Ret
1975	Osella FA2; March 742	BMW	(Italy) Duilio Truffo	5	6	8	Ret	6	6	Ret		**5**	5	Ret			
1975	Osella FA2; March 742	BMW	(Italy) Roberto Filannino												15	Ret	DNQ
1975	Osella FA2; March 742	BMW	(Italy) Arturo Merzario											Ret			Ret
1976	Osella FA2	BMW		HOC	THR	VAL	SAL	PAU	HOC	ROU	MUG	PER	EST	NOG	HOC		
1976	Osella FA2	BMW	(Italy) Giorgio Francia	DNQ	Ret	11											
1976	Osella FA2	BMW	(Italy) Gianfranco Trombetti	Ret	Ret	DNQ											
1976	Osella FA2	BMW	(Italy) Arturo Merzario												DNQ		
1979	Osella FA2/79	BMW		SIL	HOC	THR	NÜR	VAL	MUG	PAU	HOC	ZAN	PER	MIS	DON		
1979	Osella FA2/79	BMW	(United States) Eddie Cheever	**1**	5	Ret	8	Ret	Ret	1	Ret	1	5	6	7		

=== Complete Formula One results ===
(key) (results in bold indicate pole position)

Year	Chassis	Engines	Tyres	Drivers	1	2	3	4	5	6	7	8	9	10	11	12	13	14	15	16	WCC	Points
1980	FA1	Cosworth DFV 3.0 V8	G		ARG	BRA	RSA	USW	BEL	MON	FRA	GBR	GER	AUT	NED	ITA	CAN	USA			NC	0
1980	FA1	Cosworth DFV 3.0 V8	G	(United States) Eddie Cheever	DNQ	DNQ	Ret	Ret	DNQ	DNQ	Ret	Ret	Ret	Ret	Ret	12	Ret	Ret			NC	0
1981	FA1B; FA1C	Cosworth DFV 3.0 V8	M		USW	BRA	ARG	SMR	BEL	MON	ESP	FRA	GBR	GER	AUT	NED	ITA	CAN	CPL		NC	0
1981	FA1B; FA1C	Cosworth DFV 3.0 V8	M	(Argentina) Miguel Ángel Guerra	DNQ	DNQ	DNQ	Ret													NC	0
1981	FA1B; FA1C	Cosworth DFV 3.0 V8	M	(Italy) Piercarlo Ghinzani					13	DNQ											NC	0
1981	FA1B; FA1C	Cosworth DFV 3.0 V8	M	(Italy) Giorgio Francia							DNQ										NC	0
1981	FA1B; FA1C	Cosworth DFV 3.0 V8	M	(France) Jean-Pierre Jarier									8	8	10	Ret	9	Ret	Ret		NC	0
1981	FA1B; FA1C	Cosworth DFV 3.0 V8	M	(Italy) Beppe Gabbiani	Ret	DNQ	DNQ	Ret	Ret	DNQ	DNQ	DNQ	DNQ	DNQ	DNQ	DNQ	DNQ	DNQ	DNQ		NC	0
1982	FA1C	Cosworth DFV 3.0 V8	P		RSA	BRA	USW	SMR	BEL	MON	DET	CAN	NED	GBR	FRA	GER	AUT	SUI	ITA	CPL	13th	3
1982	FA1C	Cosworth DFV 3.0 V8	P	(France) Jean-Pierre Jarier	Ret	9	Ret	4	Ret	DNQ	Ret	Ret	14	Ret	Ret	Ret	DNQ	Ret	Ret	DNS	13th	3
1982	FA1C	Cosworth DFV 3.0 V8	P	(Italy) Riccardo Paletti	DNQ	DNPQ	DNQ	Ret	DNPQ	DNPQ	DNS	Ret									13th	3
1983	FA1D	Cosworth DFV 3.0 V8	M		BRA	USW	FRA	SMR	MON	BEL	DET	CAN	GBR	GER	AUT	NED	ITA	EUR	RSA		NC	0
1983	FA1D	Cosworth DFV 3.0 V8	M	(Italy) Corrado Fabi	Ret	DNQ	Ret	Ret	DNQ	Ret	DNQ	Ret									NC	0
1983	FA1D	Cosworth DFV 3.0 V8	M	(Italy) Piercarlo Ghinzani	DNQ	DNQ	DNQ														NC	0
1983	FA1E	Alfa Romeo 1260 3.0 V12	M	(Italy) Corrado Fabi									DNQ	DNQ	10	11	Ret	DNQ	Ret		NC	0
1983	FA1E	Alfa Romeo 1260 3.0 V12	M	(Italy) Piercarlo Ghinzani				DNQ	DNQ	DNQ	Ret	DNQ	Ret	Ret	11	DNQ	Ret	Ret	Ret		NC	0
1984	FA1F	Alfa Romeo 890T 1.5 V8t	P		BRA	RSA	BEL	SMR	FRA	MON	CAN	DET	DAL	GBR	GER	AUT	NED	ITA	EUR	POR	12th	2
1984	FA1F	Alfa Romeo 890T 1.5 V8t	P	(Italy) Piercarlo Ghinzani	Ret	DNS	Ret	DNQ	12	7	Ret	Ret	5	9	Ret	Ret	Ret	7	Ret	Ret	12th	2
1984	FA1F	Alfa Romeo 890T 1.5 V8t	P	(Austria) Jo Gartner										Ret	Ret	Ret	12	5^{‡}	Ret	16	12th	2
1984	FA1E	Alfa Romeo 1260 3.0 V12	P	(Austria) Jo Gartner				Ret													12th	2
1985	FA1F; FA1G	Alfa Romeo 890T 1.5 V8t	P		BRA	POR	SMR	MON	CAN	DET	FRA	GBR	GER	AUT	NED	ITA	BEL	EUR	RSA	AUS	NC	0
1985	FA1F; FA1G	Alfa Romeo 890T 1.5 V8t	P	(Italy) Piercarlo Ghinzani	12	9	NC	DNQ	Ret	Ret	15	Ret									NC	0
1985	FA1F; FA1G	Alfa Romeo 890T 1.5 V8t	P	(Netherlands) Huub Rothengatter									Ret	9	NC	Ret	NC	DNQ	Ret	7	NC	0
1986	FA1G; FA1F; FA1H	Alfa Romeo 890T 1.5 V8t	P		BRA	ESP	SMR	MON	BEL	CAN	DET	FRA	GBR	GER	HUN	AUT	ITA	POR	MEX	AUS	NC	0
1986	FA1G; FA1F; FA1H	Alfa Romeo 890T 1.5 V8t	P	(Italy) Piercarlo Ghinzani	Ret	Ret	Ret	DNQ	Ret	Ret	Ret	Ret	Ret	Ret	Ret	11	Ret	Ret	Ret	Ret	NC	0
1986	FA1G; FA1F; FA1H	Alfa Romeo 890T 1.5 V8t	P	(Germany) Christian Danner	Ret	Ret	Ret	DNQ	Ret	Ret											NC	0
1986	FA1G; FA1F; FA1H	Alfa Romeo 890T 1.5 V8t	P	(Canada) Allen Berg							Ret	Ret	Ret	12	Ret	Ret		13	16	NC	NC	0
1986	FA1G; FA1F; FA1H	Alfa Romeo 890T 1.5 V8t	P	(Italy) Alex Caffi													NC				NC	0
1987	FA1I; FA1G	Alfa Romeo 890T 1.5 V8t	G		BRA	SMR	BEL	MON	DET	FRA	GBR	GER	HUN	AUT	ITA	POR	ESP	MEX	JPN	AUS	NC	0
1987	FA1I; FA1G	Alfa Romeo 890T 1.5 V8t	G	(Italy) Alex Caffi	Ret	12	Ret	Ret	Ret	Ret	Ret	Ret	Ret	Ret	Ret	Ret	DNQ	Ret	Ret	DNQ	NC	0
1987	FA1I; FA1G	Alfa Romeo 890T 1.5 V8t	G	(Italy) Gabriele Tarquini		Ret															NC	0
1987	FA1I; FA1G	Alfa Romeo 890T 1.5 V8t	G	(Switzerland) Franco Forini											Ret	Ret	DNQ				NC	0
1988	FA1I; FA1L	Osella 890T 1.5 V8t	G		BRA	SMR	MON	MEX	CAN	DET	FRA	GBR	GER	HUN	BEL	ITA	POR	ESP	JPN	AUS	NC	0
1988	FA1I; FA1L	Osella 890T 1.5 V8t	G	(Italy) Nicola Larini	DNQ	EX	9	DNQ	DNQ	Ret	Ret	19	Ret	DNPQ	Ret	Ret	12	Ret	Ret	DNPQ	NC	0
1989	FA1M	Cosworth DFR 3.5 V8	P		BRA	SMR	MON	MEX	USA	CAN	FRA	GBR	GER	HUN	BEL	ITA	POR	ESP	JPN	AUS	NC	0
1989	FA1M	Cosworth DFR 3.5 V8	P	(Italy) Nicola Larini	DSQ	12	DNPQ	DNPQ	DNPQ	Ret	DNPQ	Ret	DNPQ	DNPQ	DNPQ	Ret	DNPQ	Ret	Ret	Ret	NC	0
1989	FA1M	Cosworth DFR 3.5 V8	P	(Italy) Piercarlo Ghinzani	DNPQ	DNPQ	DNPQ	DNPQ	DNPQ	DNPQ	DNPQ	DNPQ	DNPQ	Ret	DNPQ	DNPQ	DNPQ	Ret	DNPQ	Ret	NC	0
1990	FA1M-E	Cosworth DFR 3.5 V8	P		USA	BRA	SMR	MON	CAN	MEX	FRA	GBR	GER	HUN	BEL	ITA	POR	ESP	JPN	AUS	NC	0
1990	FA1M-E	Cosworth DFR 3.5 V8	P	(France) Olivier Grouillard	Ret	Ret	Ret	DNQ	13	19	DNPQ	DNQ	DNQ	DNPQ	16	Ret	DNQ	Ret	DNQ	13	NC	0

^{‡} Not eligible for points.
