= 1988 Mexican Grand Prix =

- Race 4 of 16 in the 1988 Formula One World Championship

Race details
- Date: 29 May 1988
- Official name: Gran Premio de México
- Location: Autódromo Hermanos Rodríguez, Mexico City, Mexico
- Course: Permanent circuit
- Course length: 4.421 km (2.747 miles)
- Distance: 67 laps, 296.207 km (184.054 miles)
- Weather: Sunny and hot

Pole position
Driver	(Brazil) Ayrton Senna	McLaren-Honda
- Time: 1:17.468

Fastest lap
Driver	(France) Alain Prost	McLaren-Honda
- Time: 1:18.608 on lap 52

Podium
First	(France) Alain Prost	McLaren-Honda
Second	(Brazil) Ayrton Senna	McLaren-Honda
Third	(Austria) Gerhard Berger	Ferrari

The 1988 Mexican Grand Prix was a Formula One motor race held on 29 May 1988 at the Autódromo Hermanos Rodríguez, Mexico City. It was the fourth race of the 1988 Formula One World Championship. The 67-lap race was won by Alain Prost, driving a McLaren-Honda, with teammate Ayrton Senna second and Gerhard Berger third in a Ferrari.

== Report ==
=== Qualifying ===
Qualifying for the Mexican Grand Prix saw few surprises. The turbo powered cars were expected to dominate in the high (2,240 metres (7,350 ft)) altitude of Mexico City where the naturally aspirated cars would lose approximately 20-25% of their power in the thinner air. The turbo cars also lost some of their own power in the thinner air, but it was estimated to only be around 5%, still giving them a big advantage over the atmos.

The McLaren-Hondas dominated the qualifying session once again. Ayrton Senna took his 20th career pole and his 4th pole from 4 races in 1988 with a lap time that was almost a second faster than Nigel Mansell's 1987 time despite the restriction in turbo boost from 4.0 Bar to 2.5 bar for 1988 (a drop of approximately 300 bhp (224 kW; 304 PS)). It was the first time in 1988 that a 1987 pole time had been beaten. Alain Prost was predictably second on the grid, though he was some 6/10ths slower than his teammate. Gerhard Berger (Ferrari) and Nelson Piquet (Lotus-Honda) made up the 2nd row. Satoru Nakajima (Lotus-Honda) and Eddie Cheever (Arrows-Megatron) made good use of the turbos' altitude advantage to qualify 6th and 7th respectively behind the 5th placed Ferrari of Michele Alboreto. For Nakajima it was something of a redemption as he had failed to qualify at Monaco. Mansell in the Williams-Judd could only make 14th due to continuing problems with the FW12's computer controlled Reactive Ride (suspension) with both Mansell and Patrese reporting that their cars handling would not only change from lap to lap, but sometimes even from one corner to the next.

According to analyst and former F1 driver David Hobbs during ESPN's live broadcast of the race in the United States, the McLaren-Hondas were reaching 205 mph (330 km/h) on the circuit's 1.2 km (0.75 mi) long main straight during qualifying. During the year the McLarens would only beat this speed at the German Grand Prix on Hockenheim's 1.6 km (0.99 mi) long straight out into the forest when they were timed at 207 mph (333 km/h) during qualifying.

Alessandro Nannini's Benetton-Ford was the fastest 'atmo' car, some 3.3 seconds slower than Senna's pole time, while the Tyrrells of Jonathan Palmer and Julian Bailey, the turbo Osella of Nicola Larini and the Minardi of Adrián Campos failed to qualify. German Bernd Schneider qualified in 15th place for his first Grand Prix start in the Zakspeed turbo. Larini's failure to qualify in the Osella turbo, reportedly the most powerful used in Grand Prix racing in 1988, highlighted the problems the Osella team had with both the ancient Alfa Romeo 890T engine (badged as "Osella V8" for the year after Alfa's parent company Fiat pulled their support) and their car, the FA1L, in 1988 which was appropriately nicknamed "FAIL".

The last qualifying session was dominated by Philippe Alliot's terrifying crash after he lost control of his Lola, coming out of the Peraltada curve that leads onto the pit straight. The Peraltada, being slightly banked, was being taken at speeds in excess of 240 km/h (149 mph) in qualifying. After riding the outside curbing, the car suddenly pulled hard right, cut across the track and collided with the pit wall, barrel-rolling down the straight and back across the track, immediately disintegrating, and in the end stopped upside down on the edge of the track. Remarkably, Alliot was not only unhurt, but the Larrousse team was able to rebuild the Lola LC88 overnight (the re-build was necessary as the team was still awaiting a replacement chassis after Alliot had also crashed in the previous race in Monaco). After being given a clean bill of health from chief F1 medic Professor Sid Watkins, Alliot was able to take his place on the starting grid.

=== Race ===
The first start was aborted because of Alessandro Nannini, who stalled the engine of his Benetton on the grid. As is normal practice since it meant an extra formation lap and as re-fueling on the grid was not allowed, this saw the race reduced from 68 to 67 laps. On the second start, Prost made a lightning getaway and took the lead. Senna was slightly slowed by the pop-off valve opening too soon and was passed by Nelson Piquet who had actually made the best start; so good that he was almost able to out brake Prost into the first turn but the Frenchman held his line. This allowed Prost to take advantage and build a lead of almost two seconds by the end of the first lap. Senna passed Piquet for second, coming into the Peraltada curve on the first lap, but from there could only ever bridge the ever-growing gap to Prost when lapping traffic. While the McLarens held the first two places throughout the race, Berger had passed Piquet for 3rd place under braking at the end of the main straight on lap 9, and by half distance he had moved to within three seconds of Senna when he backed off after receiving a 'low fuel' warning from his onboard computer (which turned out to be incorrect). Nakajima was also slightly slowed by the pop-off valve opening too soon on his Honda engine and was passed by Michele Alboreto on lap 8. On lap 28 Nakajima retired with piston failure in his Honda engine, followed on lap 59 by teammate Piquet with a similar engine failure.

As predicted, the turbo cars dominated the race. The two Ferraris finished 3rd and 4th (Alboreto in 4th being the last car to be lapped by the McLarens) ahead of the two Arrows of Derek Warwick and Eddie Cheever who had a race-long duel and were separated by just 0.7s at the line with Cheever describing their dice as "good fun" (when interviewed by ESPN's pit reporter John Bisignano during the race, Arrows team boss Jackie Oliver admitted that during the race he had no control over his drivers other than a brief to try and not take each other out). The first 'atmo' cars home were the two Benettons who finished two laps down (even lapped by the two Arrows cars directly ahead of them) and out of the points in 7th and 8th after another race long duel with Nannini coming out on top, battling not only his teammate but a pinched nerve in his right foot from never having had to drive as hard for as long. Yannick Dalmas (Lola-Ford) fought his way from 22nd up to 9th at the flag and after starting 15th, while F1 rookie Bernd Schneider gained some praise after running as high as 11th in the much maligned Zakspeed in the early laps before retiring with a blown engine on lap 17.

Alain Prost set a new lap record on lap 52 of the 67-lap race with a time of 1:18.608, half a second faster than Nelson Piquet's 1987 lap record when the turbo engines had approximately 300 more horsepower. This, along with Senna's faster than 1987 pole time, showed the advancements in engines, tyres, aerodynamics and chassis development in the seven months between the 1987 and 1988 races.

== Classification ==
=== Pre-qualifying ===
Pos	No	Driver	Constructor	Time	Gap
1	22	(Italy) Andrea de Cesaris	Rial-Ford	1:24.720	—
2	36	(Italy) Alex Caffi	Dallara-Ford	1:27.331	+2.611
3	32	(Argentina) Oscar Larrauri	EuroBrun-Ford	1:27.523	+2.803
4	31	(Italy) Gabriele Tarquini	Coloni-Ford	1:28.498	+3.778
EX	33	(Italy) Stefano Modena	EuroBrun-Ford	1:31.473	+6.753

=== Qualifying ===
Pos	No	Driver	Constructor	Q1	Q2	Gap
1	12	(Brazil) Ayrton Senna	McLaren-Honda	1:17.468	1:17.666	—
2	11	(France) Alain Prost	McLaren-Honda	1:18.097	1:18.301	+0.629
3	28	(Austria) Gerhard Berger	Ferrari	1:19.725	1:18.120	+0.652
4	1	(Brazil) Nelson Piquet	Lotus-Honda	1:20.380	1:18.946	+1.478
5	27	(Italy) Michele Alboreto	Ferrari	1:20.328	1:19.626	+2.158
6	2	(Japan) Satoru Nakajima	Lotus-Honda	1:21.694	1:20.275	+2.807
7	18	(United States) Eddie Cheever	Arrows-Megatron	1:21.691	1:20.475	+3.007
8	19	(Italy) Alessandro Nannini	Benetton-Ford	1:20.740	1:21.403	+3.272
9	17	(United Kingdom) Derek Warwick	Arrows-Megatron	1:20.775	1:21.403	+3.307
10	16	(Italy) Ivan Capelli	March-Judd	1:22.335	1:21.952	+4.484
11	20	(Belgium) Thierry Boutsen	Benetton-Ford	1:22.164	1:22.029	+4.561
12	22	(Italy) Andrea de Cesaris	Rial-Ford	1:22.864	1:22.245	+4.777
13	30	(France) Philippe Alliot	Lola-Ford	1:22.348	1:22.557	+4.880
14	5	(United Kingdom) Nigel Mansell	Williams-Judd	1:23.246	1:22.363	+4.895
15	10	(Germany) Bernd Schneider	Zakspeed	1:24.335	1:22.642	+5.174
16	15	(Brazil) Maurício Gugelmin	March-Judd	1:22.801	5:30.133	+5.333
17	6	(Italy) Riccardo Patrese	Williams-Judd	1:24.142	1:22.972	+5.511
18	9	(Italy) Piercarlo Ghinzani	Zakspeed	1:25.375	1:23.078	+5.610
19	14	(France) Philippe Streiff	AGS-Ford	1:23.191	1:23.750	+5.723
20	25	(France) René Arnoux	Ligier-Judd	1:24.315	1:23.287	+5.819
21	31	(Italy) Gabriele Tarquini	Coloni-Ford	1:24.662	1:23.603	+6.135
22	29	(France) Yannick Dalmas	Lola-Ford	1:24.279	1:23.606	+6.138
23	36	(Italy) Alex Caffi	Dallara-Ford	1:25.564	1:23.716	+6.248
24	26	(Sweden) Stefan Johansson	Ligier-Judd	1:25.277	1:23.721	+6.253
25	24	(Spain) Luis Pérez-Sala	Minardi-Ford	1:23.911	1:23.857	+6.389
26	32	(Argentina) Oscar Larrauri	EuroBrun-Ford	1:24.364	1:24.032	+6.564
DNQ	3	(United Kingdom) Jonathan Palmer	Tyrrell-Ford	1:24.390	1:24.849	+6.922
DNQ	21	(Italy) Nicola Larini	Osella	1:24.405	1:24.408	+6.937
DNQ	4	(United Kingdom) Julian Bailey	Tyrrell-Ford	1:25.525	1:25.231	+7.763
DNQ	23	(Spain) Adrián Campos	Minardi-Ford	1:26.696	1:26.058	+8.590

=== Race ===
Pos	No	Driver	Constructor	Laps	Time/Retired	Grid	Points
1	11	(France) Alain Prost	McLaren-Honda	67	1:30:15.737	2	9
2	12	(Brazil) Ayrton Senna	McLaren-Honda	67	+ 7.104	1	6
3	28	(Austria) Gerhard Berger	Ferrari	67	+ 57.314	3	4
4	27	(Italy) Michele Alboreto	Ferrari	66	+ 1 Lap	5	3
5	17	(United Kingdom) Derek Warwick	Arrows-Megatron	66	+ 1 Lap	9	2
6	18	(United States) Eddie Cheever	Arrows-Megatron	66	+ 1 Lap	7	1
7	19	(Italy) Alessandro Nannini	Benetton-Ford	65	+ 2 Laps	8	
8	20	(Belgium) Thierry Boutsen	Benetton-Ford	64	+ 3 Laps	11	
9	29	(France) Yannick Dalmas	Lola-Ford	64	+ 3 Laps	22	
10	26	(Sweden) Stefan Johansson	Ligier-Judd	63	+ 4 Laps	24	
11	24	(Spain) Luis Pérez-Sala	Minardi-Ford	63	+ 4 Laps	25	
12	14	(France) Philippe Streiff	AGS-Ford	63	+ 4 Laps	19	
13	32	(Argentina) Oscar Larrauri	EuroBrun-Ford	63	+ 4 Laps	26	
14	31	(Italy) Gabriele Tarquini	Coloni-Ford	62	+ 5 Laps	21	
15	9	(Italy) Piercarlo Ghinzani	Zakspeed	61	+ 6 Laps	18	
16	16	(Italy) Ivan Capelli	March-Judd	61	+ 6 Laps	10	
Ret	1	(Brazil) Nelson Piquet	Lotus-Honda	58	Engine	4	
Ret	22	(Italy) Andrea de Cesaris	Rial-Ford	52	Gearbox	12	
Ret	2	(Japan) Satoru Nakajima	Lotus-Honda	27	Engine	6	
Ret	5	(United Kingdom) Nigel Mansell	Williams-Judd	20	Engine	14	
Ret	10	(West Germany) Bernd Schneider	Zakspeed	16	Engine	15	
Ret	6	(Italy) Riccardo Patrese	Williams-Judd	16	Engine	17	
Ret	25	(France) René Arnoux	Ligier-Judd	13	Accident	20	
Ret	36	(Italy) Alex Caffi	Dallara-Ford	13	Brakes	23	
Ret	15	(Brazil) Maurício Gugelmin	March-Judd	10	Electrical	16	
Ret	30	(France) Philippe Alliot	Lola-Ford	0	Suspension	13	
DNQ	23	(Spain) Adrián Campos	Minardi-Ford				
DNQ	3	(United Kingdom) Jonathan Palmer	Tyrrell-Ford				
DNQ	21	(Italy) Nicola Larini	Osella				
DNQ	4	(United Kingdom) Julian Bailey	Tyrrell-Ford				
EX	33	(Italy) Stefano Modena	EuroBrun-Ford		Illegal Rear Wing		

== Championship standings after the race ==
Drivers' Championship standings

Pos	Driver	Points
1	(France) Alain Prost	33
2	(Austria) Gerhard Berger	18
3	(Brazil) Ayrton Senna	15
4	(Italy) Michele Alboreto	9
5	(Brazil) Nelson Piquet	8

Constructors' Championship standings

Pos	Constructor	Points
1	(United Kingdom) McLaren-Honda	48
2	(Italy) Ferrari	27
3	(United Kingdom) Lotus-Honda	9
4	(United Kingdom) Arrows-Megatron	9
5	(United Kingdom) Benetton-Ford	4

- Note: Only the top five positions are included for both sets of standings.

Previous race: 1988 Monaco Grand Prix	FIA Formula One World Championship; 1988 season	Next race: 1988 Canadian Grand Prix
Previous race: 1987 Mexican Grand Prix	Mexican Grand Prix	Next race: 1989 Mexican Grand Prix
