= Piercarlo Ghinzani =

Italian racing driver (born 1952)

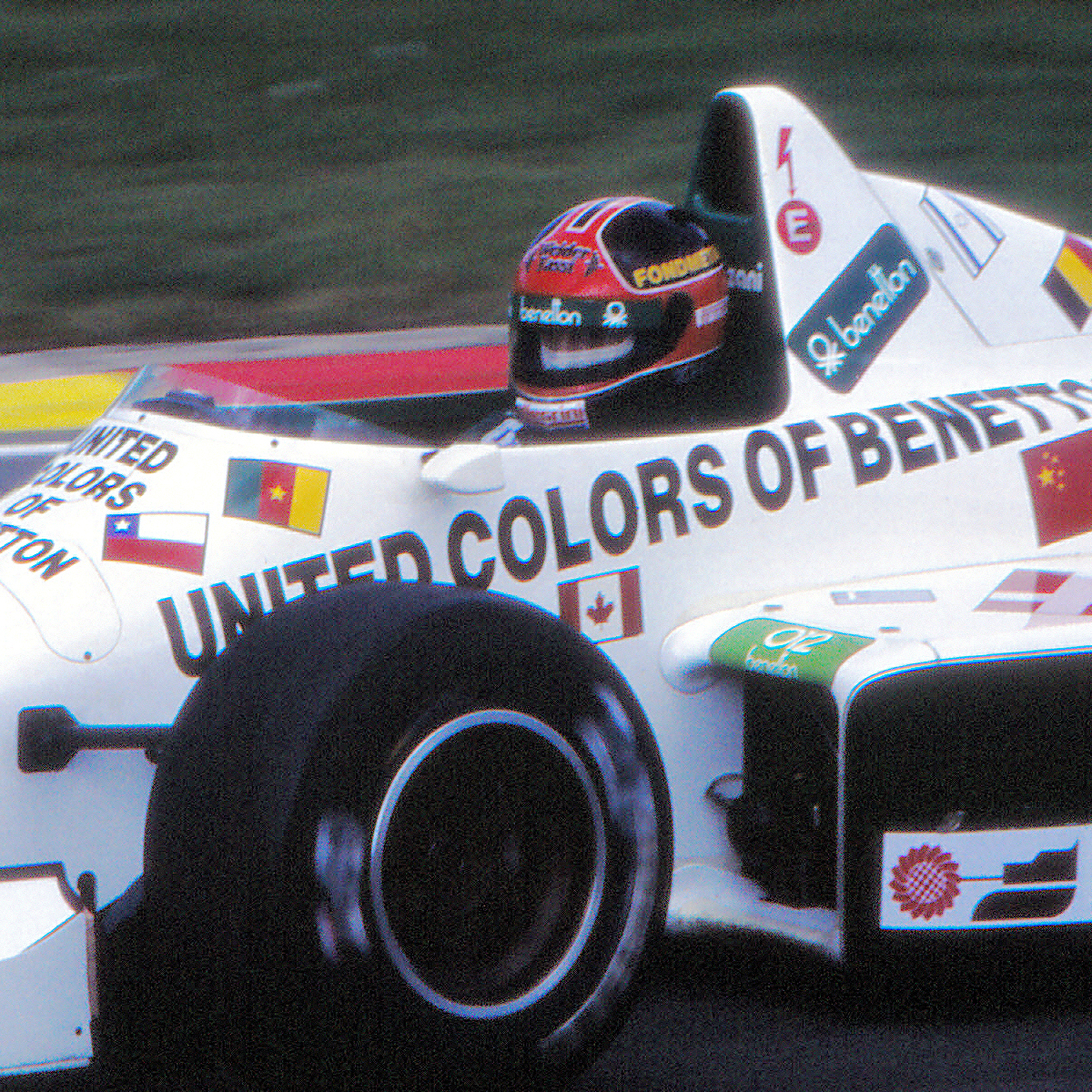
- Ghinzani driving the Toleman TG185 during the 1985 European Grand Prix
- Born: 16 January 1952 (age 74); Riviera d'Adda, Lombardy, Italy

Formula One World Championship career
- Nationality: (Italy) Italian
- Active years: 1981, 1983–1989
- Team(s): Osella, Toleman, Ligier, Zakspeed
- Entries: 111 (74 starts)
- Championships: 0
- Wins: 0
- Podiums: 0
- Career points: 2
- Pole positions: 0
- Fastest laps: 0
- First entry: 1981 Belgian Grand Prix
- Last entry: 1989 Australian Grand Prix

Piercarlo Ghinzani (born 16 January 1952) is an Italian former racing driver and motorsport executive, who competed in Formula One from 1981 to 1989.

Ghinzani participated in 111 Formula One Grands Prix for Osella, Toleman, Ligier and Zakspeed, debuting at the 1981 Belgian Grand Prix. He scored his only points finish at the 1984 Dallas Grand Prix with Osella, where he finished fifth. Ghinzani entered four editions of the 24 Hours of Le Mans from 1980 to 1983 with Lancia, but retired with mechanical faults in each.

Upon retiring from motor racing, Ghinzani founded the eponymous racing team Team Ghinzani in 1992, which has since competed in A1 Grand Prix as A1 Team Italy from 2005 to 2009, as well as in several national and continental Formula Three championships.

== Early career ==
Ghinzani started his racing career in Formula Ford. He then graduated to Formula Three, racing with the Allegrini Team. In 1976 he switched to Team Euroracing, and won the European Championship in 1977, giving March, who was supplying the chassis, its first European Formula Three title. In 1979 he won the Italian Championship. He also had a one-off in Formula 2 in 1978, finishing fourth at Pergusa on a March-BMW, and in 1979 tried to qualify the Dywa at the Monza round of the 1980 British Formula One Championship.

== Formula One ==
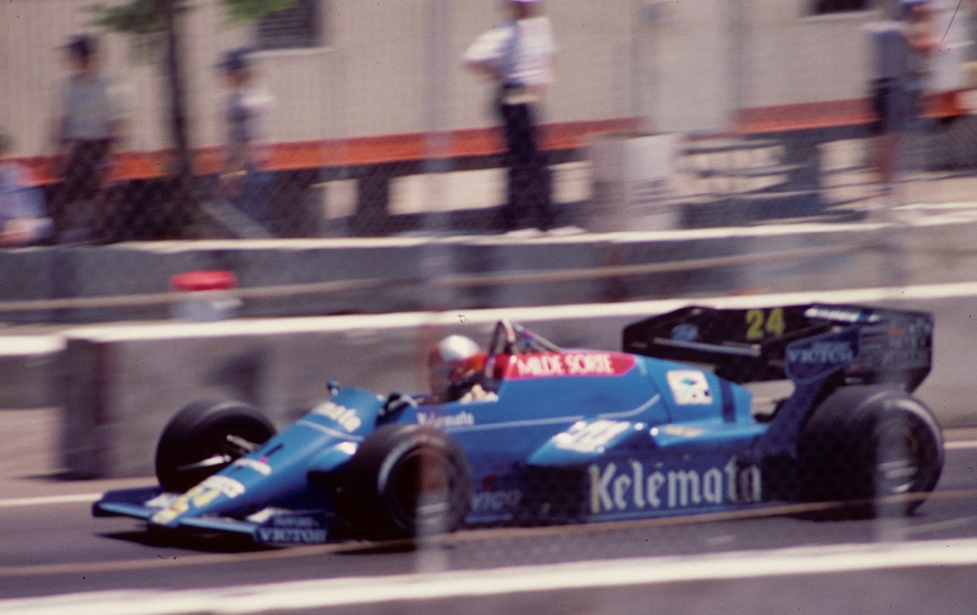
Ghinzani achieved Osella's second and last points finish at the 1984 Dallas Grand Prix

Ghinzani debuted in Formula One on 17 May at the 1981 Belgian Grand Prix at Zolder, when Enzo Osella asked him to replace the injured Miguel Angel Guerra. In 1983 Ghinzani was invited to test for Tyrrell. Despite lapping faster than Michele Alboreto, Danny Sullivan, Chico Serra and Stefan Johansson, Ken Tyrrell deciced to retain Alboreto and Sullivan, and Ghinzani signed with Osella for his first full Formula One season. Despite achieving no points finishes, Ghinzani stayed with the team for 1984. After qualifying 20th for the second race of the season at Kyalami in South Africa, he crashed in the morning warm-up at high speed through the Jukskei Sweep. His Osella hit the wall and with almost a full fuel load of 220 litres, went up in flames and he suffered burns to his hands and face that kept him out of the race. He recovered to score his first and only career points when he finished fifth at the 1984 Dallas Grand Prix in a race marked by high attrition, crumbling tarmac and oppressive heat.

After beginning 1985 with Osella, Ghinzani was hired by the Toleman team halfway through the season to partner fellow Italian Teo Fabi. Although the car at times displayed flashes of competitiveness (Fabi managed to qualify on pole in Germany), it was marred by unreliability problems, and both drivers were forced to retire for the rest of the season. In 1986 he returned to Osella, but his second stint with the team, which was running a turbocharged Alfa Romeo V8 engine, was unsuccessful.

For 1987, Ghinzani was contracted to the Ligier team, alongside former Grand Prix winner René Arnoux. The team planned to run the new turbocharged 4 cylinder Alfa Romeo engines, but those plans were scuppered by Arnoux's scathing pre-season comments that likened the engine to dog food, leading Alfa's parent company Fiat to pull the plug on the engine project. This forced the team to hastily adapt their cars to fit Megatron engines. (The Megatron was actually the BMW engine used by Brabham and previously by Arrows and Benetton before BMW retired from the sport). However, while both the Alfa and Megatron were 4-cylinder engines, their respective plumbing was completely different, forcing the team to miss the opening race of the season in Brazil while the rear suspension was re-designed to fit the new engine. Ghinzani occasionally ran in the points for Ligier, notably in Germany, before being forced to retire. During qualifying for the British Grand Prix, Ghinzani's Ligier ran out of fuel in front of the pits. His mechanics jumped the pit wall, refuelled him on the track and then push-started him, a clear violation of the rules leading to Ghinzani's exclusion from the remainder of the event. Before the incident, the Italian had set a time which would have put him 19th on the grid.

In 1988, Ghinzani drove for the German Zakspeed team, which ran its own 4 cylinder turbo engine, though generally without success. His best finish for the year was 14th in the German Grand Prix at a wet Hockenheim. Despite being one of the few teams to use turbo powered engines in 1988, Ghinzani and his teammate, young German Bernd Schneider, struggled to qualify for races and were often slower than the atmospheric cars.

Ghinzani's final Formula One season was 1989, where he once again raced with Osella as teammate to young Italian driver Nicola Larini. Ghinzani announced his decision to retire from Grand Prix racing before official practice of the final race of the 1989 season in Australia. He had qualified 21st, but his race ended when his Osella was hit from behind by the Lotus of triple World Champion Nelson Piquet on lap 19.

Ghinzani holds the record for the most Formula One appearances without qualifying in the top-ten.

== Sports cars ==
In 1982, Ghinzani drove for the Lancia Sports car racing team, winning a Group C World Championship event with Michele Alboreto at Mugello in 1982. He competed at the 24 Hours of Le Mans four times between 1980 and 1983 but failed to finish on all occasions.

== Team Ghinzani ==
In 1992, Ghinzani founded Team Ghinzani. The team Ghinzani have raced in Italian, German and Formula 3 Euro Series since 2000 and also entered Italian Formula 3000/Euro Formula 3000 between 1999 and 2002. Since 2005–06 season, the outfit has managed A1 Team Italy in collaboration with Arco Motorsport, in the A1 Grand Prix series.

== Racing record ==
=== Complete 24 Hours of Le Mans results ===
Year	Team	Co-Drivers	Car	Class	Laps	Pos.	Class Pos.
1980	(Italy) Lancia Corse	(Italy) Gianfranco Brancatelli (Finland) Markku Alén	Lancia Beta Monte Carlo	Gr.5	26	DNF	DNF
1981	(Italy) Martini Racing	(Italy) Riccardo Patrese (Germany) Hans Heyer	Lancia Beta Monte Carlo	Gr.5	186	DNF	DNF
1982	(Italy) Martini Racing	(Italy) Riccardo Patrese (Germany) Hans Heyer	Lancia LC1	Gr.6	152	DNF	DNF
1983	(Italy) Martini Lancia	(Italy) Michele Alboreto (Germany) Hans Heyer	Lancia LC2	C	121	DNF	DNF

=== Complete Formula One World Championship results ===
(key)

Year	Entrant	Chassis	Engine	1	2	3	4	5	6	7	8	9	10	11	12	13	14	15	16	WDC	Pts
1981	Osella Squadra Corse	Osella FA1B	Ford Cosworth DFV 3.0 V8	USW	BRA	ARG	SMR	BEL; 13	MON; DNQ	ESP	FRA	GBR	GER	AUT	NED	ITA	CAN	CPL		NC	0
1983	Osella Squadra Corse	Osella FA1D	Ford Cosworth DFV 3.0 V8	BRA; DNQ	USW; DNQ	FRA; DNQ														NC	0
1983	Osella Squadra Corse	Osella FA1E	Alfa Romeo 1260 3.0 V12				SMR; DNQ	MON; DNQ	BEL; DNQ	DET; Ret	CAN; DNQ	GBR; Ret	GER; Ret	AUT; 11	NED; DNQ	ITA; Ret	EUR; Ret	RSA; Ret		NC	0
1984	Osella Squadra Corse	Osella FA1F	Alfa Romeo 890T 1.5 V8t	BRA; Ret	RSA; DNS	BEL; Ret	SMR; DNQ	FRA; 12	MON; 7	CAN; Ret	DET; Ret	DAL; 5	GBR; 9	GER; Ret	AUT; Ret	NED; Ret	ITA; 7^{†}	EUR; Ret	POR; Ret	19th	2
1985	Osella Squadra Corse	Osella FA1F	Alfa Romeo 890T 1.5 V8t	BRA; 12	POR; 9	SMR; NC														NC	0
1985	Osella Squadra Corse	Osella FA1G	Alfa Romeo 890T 1.5 V8t				MON; DNQ	CAN; Ret	DET; Ret	FRA; 15	GBR; Ret	GER								NC	0
1985	Toleman Group Motorsport	Toleman TG185	Hart 415T 1.5 L4t										AUT; DNS	NED; Ret	ITA; DNS	BEL; Ret	EUR; Ret	RSA; Ret	AUS; Ret	NC	0
1986	Osella Squadra Corse	Osella FA1F	Alfa Romeo 890T 1.5 V8t	BRA; Ret	ESP; Ret	SMR; Ret	MON; DNQ	BEL; Ret	CAN; Ret	DET; Ret										NC	0
1986	Osella Squadra Corse	Osella FA1H	Alfa Romeo 890T 1.5 V8t								FRA; Ret	GBR; Ret								NC	0
1986	Osella Squadra Corse	Osella FA1G	Alfa Romeo 890T 1.5 V8t										GER; Ret	HUN; Ret	AUT; 11	ITA; Ret	POR; Ret	MEX; Ret	AUS; Ret	NC	0
1987	Ligier Loto	Ligier JS29B	Megatron M12/13 1.5 L4t	BRA	SMR; Ret	BEL; 7^{†}	MON; 12	DET; Ret												NC	0
1987	Ligier Loto	Ligier JS29C	Megatron M12/13 1.5 L4t						FRA; Ret	GBR; EX	GER; Ret	HUN; 12	AUT; 8	ITA; 8	POR; Ret	ESP; Ret	MEX; Ret	JPN; 13	AUS; Ret	NC	0
1988	West Zakspeed Racing	Zakspeed 881	Zakspeed 1500/4 1.5 L4t	BRA; DNQ	SMR; Ret	MON; Ret	MEX; 15	CAN; 14^{†}	DET; DNQ	FRA; EX	GBR; DNQ	GER; 14	HUN; DNQ	BEL; Ret						NC	0
1988	West Zakspeed Racing	Zakspeed 881B	Zakspeed 1500/4 1.5 L4t												ITA; Ret	POR; DNQ	ESP; DNQ	JPN; DNQ	AUS; Ret	NC	0
1989	Osella Squadra Corse	Osella FA1M	Ford Cosworth DFR 3.5 V8	BRA; DNPQ	SMR; DNPQ	MON; DNPQ	MEX; DNPQ	USA; DNPQ	CAN; DNPQ	FRA; DNPQ	GBR; DNPQ	GER; DNPQ	HUN; Ret	BEL; DNPQ	ITA; DNPQ	POR; DNPQ	ESP; Ret	JPN; DNPQ	AUS; Ret	NC	0

^{†} Did not finish, but was classified as he had completed more than 90% of the race distance.

Sporting positions
Preceded by Riccardo Patrese	European Formula Three Champion; 1977	Succeeded by Jan Lammers
Preceded by Siegfried Stohr	Italian Formula Three Champion; 1979	Succeeded by Guido Pardini
