= 1988 Monaco Grand Prix =

Coordinates: 43°44′4.74″N 7°25′16.8″E

- Race 3 of 16 in the 1988 Formula One World Championship
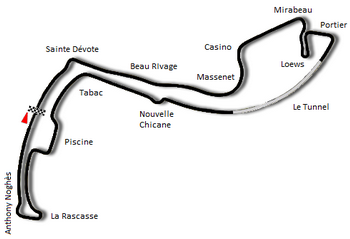

Race details
- Date: 15 May 1988
- Official name: 46e Grand Prix de Monaco
- Location: Circuit de Monaco; Monte Carlo, Monaco
- Course: Street circuit
- Course length: 3.328 km (2.068 miles)
- Distance: 78 laps, 259.584 km (161.298 miles)
- Weather: Warm and dry

Pole position
Driver	(Brazil) Ayrton Senna	McLaren-Honda
- Time: 1:23.998

Fastest lap
Driver	(Brazil) Ayrton Senna	McLaren-Honda
- Time: 1:26.321 on lap 59

Podium
First	(France) Alain Prost	McLaren-Honda
Second	(Austria) Gerhard Berger	Ferrari
Third	(Italy) Michele Alboreto	Ferrari

The 1988 Monaco Grand Prix (formally the 46e Grand Prix de Monaco) was a Formula One motor race held on 15 May 1988 at the Circuit de Monaco, Monte Carlo. It was the third race of the 1988 Formula One World Championship.

The 78-lap race was won by Frenchman Alain Prost, driving a McLaren-Honda. Prost took his 30th win – including 4th and final in Monaco – after Brazilian teammate Ayrton Senna crashed out late on while leading comfortably. Austrian driver Gerhard Berger finished second in a Ferrari, with Italian teammate Michele Alboreto third, scoring his 20th podium. It was McLaren's 58th win, 150th podium and 40th fastest lap. Honda engine scored its 30th win.

== Qualifying ==
=== Qualifying report ===
The McLaren-Hondas continued their dominant form from the previous race at Imola, as Ayrton Senna took pole position by an almost unbelievable 1.5 seconds ahead of teammate Alain Prost, with a further 1.2 seconds back to the Ferrari of Gerhard Berger in third. Berger's teammate Michele Alboreto was fourth, while Nigel Mansell was fifth in the Williams, the quickest of the naturally-aspirated cars, albeit some 3.6 seconds behind Senna. Completing the top ten were Alessandro Nannini in the Benetton, Derek Warwick in the Arrows, Riccardo Patrese in the second Williams, Eddie Cheever in the second Arrows and Jonathan Palmer in the Tyrrell, while among the non-qualifiers was Satoru Nakajima, whose Lotus was powered by the same Honda turbo engine as the McLaren.

=== Qualifying classification ===
Pos	No	Driver	Constructor	Q1	Q2	Gap
1	12	(Brazil) Ayrton Senna	McLaren-Honda	1:26.464	1:23.998	
2	11	(France) Alain Prost	McLaren-Honda	1:28.375	1:25.425	+1.427
3	28	(Austria) Gerhard Berger	Ferrari	1:29.001	1:26.685	+2.687
4	27	(Italy) Michele Alboreto	Ferrari	1:29.931	1:27.297	+3.299
5	5	(United Kingdom) Nigel Mansell	Williams-Judd	1:28.475	1:27.665	+3.667
6	19	(Italy) Alessandro Nannini	Benetton-Ford	1:29.093	1:27.869	+3.871
7	17	(United Kingdom) Derek Warwick	Arrows-Megatron	1:29.928	1:27.872	+3.874
8	6	(Italy) Riccardo Patrese	Williams-Judd	1:29.130	1:28.016	+4.018
9	18	(United States) Eddie Cheever	Arrows-Megatron	1:32.889	1:28.227	+4.229
10	3	(United Kingdom) Jonathan Palmer	Tyrrell-Ford	1:30.679	1:28.358	+4.360
11	1	(Brazil) Nelson Piquet	Lotus-Honda	1:30.924	1:28.403	+4.405
12	14	(France) Philippe Streiff	AGS-Ford	1:29.597	1:28.527	+4.529
13	30	(France) Philippe Alliot	Lola-Ford	1:31.375	1:28.536	+4.538
14	15	(Brazil) Maurício Gugelmin	March-Judd	1:32.148	1:28.610	+4.612
15	24	(Spain) Luis Pérez-Sala	Minardi-Ford	1:31.662	1:28.625	+4.627
16	20	(Belgium) Thierry Boutsen	Benetton-Ford	1:29.539	1:28.640	+4.642
17	36	(Italy) Alex Caffi	Dallara-Ford	1:33.691	1:29.075	+5.077
18	32	(Argentina) Oscar Larrauri	EuroBrun-Ford	1:31.861	1:29.093	+5.095
19	22	(Italy) Andrea de Cesaris	Rial-Ford	1:33.183	1:29.298	+5.300
20	25	(France) René Arnoux	Ligier-Judd	1:31.964	1:29.480	+5.482
21	29	(France) Yannick Dalmas	Lola-Ford	1:33.158	1:29.601	+5.603
22	16	(Italy) Ivan Capelli	March-Judd	1:35.216	1:29.603	+5.605
23	9	(Italy) Piercarlo Ghinzani	Zakspeed	1:33.005	1:30.121	+6.213
24	31	(Italy) Gabriele Tarquini	Coloni-Ford	1:32.792	1:30.252	+6.254
25	21	(Italy) Nicola Larini	Osella	1:36.705	1:30.335	+6.337
26	26	(Sweden) Stefan Johansson	Ligier-Judd	1:36.036	1:30.505	+6.507
DNQ	2	(Japan) Satoru Nakajima	Lotus-Honda	1:30.611	1:31.573	+6.613
DNQ	10	(West Germany) Bernd Schneider	Zakspeed	1:33.585	1:30.613	+6.615
DNQ	23	(Spain) Adrián Campos	Minardi-Ford	1:32.627	1:30.793	+6.795
DNQ	4	(United Kingdom) Julian Bailey	Tyrrell-Ford	1:34.192	1:30.816	+6.818

== Race ==
=== Race report ===
At the start, Senna led away, while Berger overtook Prost when the Frenchman momentarily could not engage second gear. Behind them, a variety of accidents occurred at Sainte-Dévote: Alex Caffi hit the wall in his Dallara and World Champion Nelson Piquet collided with Cheever, which forced the Brazilian to retire at the end of the first lap and thus end a disastrous weekend for the Lotus team.

The running order of Senna, Berger, Prost, Mansell, Alboreto and Nannini was maintained until lap 33 when Alboreto took Mansell off at the Swimming Pool, ending the Englishman's race. Nannini then suffered a gearbox failure on lap 39. On lap 51, Patrese collided with Philippe Alliot's Lola while trying to lap him; Alliot retired immediately.

On lap 54, Prost passed Berger for second on the run to Sainte-Dévote, though he was some 50 seconds behind Senna. In an effort to put some pressure on his team-mate, he started trading fastest laps with him. With 11 laps remaining, McLaren team boss Ron Dennis radioed Senna to slow down to ensure a safe 1-2 finish, allowing Prost to gain six seconds.

On lap 67, Senna lost concentration at Portier, causing him to crash his McLaren into the barrier and damage the car's front suspension. Immediately afterwards, he went to his home in Monaco to contemplate losing a race that he had dominated from the first time he took to the track for free practice on Thursday morning; the McLaren team did not even hear from him until that evening, when he walked into the pits as they were packing up.

Prost thus took his fourth Monaco win in five years, with Berger some 20 seconds behind and Alboreto a further 21 seconds back. Warwick finished fourth after a race-long battle with Palmer, while Patrese recovered from his collision with Alliot to take the final point, passing the other Lola of Yannick Dalmas on the last lap. Patrese's point was also the first-ever World Championship point scored by a Judd-powered car and his first point for Williams.

=== Race classification ===
Pos	No	Driver	Constructor	Laps	Time/Retired	Grid	Points
1	11	(France) Alain Prost	McLaren-Honda	78	1:57:17.077	2	9
2	28	(Austria) Gerhard Berger	Ferrari	78	+ 20.453	3	6
3	27	(Italy) Michele Alboreto	Ferrari	78	+ 41.229	4	4
4	17	(United Kingdom) Derek Warwick	Arrows-Megatron	77	+ 1 lap	7	3
5	3	(United Kingdom) Jonathan Palmer	Tyrrell-Ford	77	+ 1 lap	10	2
6	6	(Italy) Riccardo Patrese	Williams-Judd	77	+ 1 lap	8	1
7	29	(France) Yannick Dalmas	Lola-Ford	77	+ 1 lap	21	
8	20	(Belgium) Thierry Boutsen	Benetton-Ford	76	+ 2 laps	16	
9	21	(Italy) Nicola Larini	Osella	75	+ 3 laps	25	
10	16	(Italy) Ivan Capelli	March-Judd	72	+ 6 laps	22	
Ret	12	(Brazil) Ayrton Senna	McLaren-Honda	66	Accident	1	
Ret	30	(France) Philippe Alliot	Lola-Ford	50	Collision	13	
Ret	15	(Brazil) Maurício Gugelmin	March-Judd	45	Fuel system	14	
Ret	9	(Italy) Piercarlo Ghinzani	Zakspeed	43	Gearbox	23	
Ret	19	(Italy) Alessandro Nannini	Benetton-Ford	38	Gearbox	6	
Ret	24	(Spain) Luis Pérez-Sala	Minardi-Ford	36	Halfshaft	15	
Ret	5	(United Kingdom) Nigel Mansell	Williams-Judd	32	Collision	5	
Ret	22	(Italy) Andrea de Cesaris	Rial-Ford	28	Engine	19	
Ret	25	(France) René Arnoux	Ligier-Judd	17	Engine	20	
Ret	32	(Argentina) Oscar Larrauri	EuroBrun-Ford	14	Brakes	18	
Ret	18	(United States) Eddie Cheever	Arrows-Megatron	8	Engine	9	
Ret	26	(Sweden) Stefan Johansson	Ligier-Judd	6	Engine	26	
Ret	31	(Italy) Gabriele Tarquini	Coloni-Ford	5	Suspension	24	
Ret	1	(Brazil) Nelson Piquet	Lotus-Honda	1	Collision	11	
Ret	36	(Italy) Alex Caffi	Dallara-Ford	0	Spun off	17	
DNS	14	(France) Philippe Streiff	AGS-Ford	0	Throttle	12	
DNQ	2	(Japan) Satoru Nakajima	Lotus-Honda				
DNQ	10	(West Germany) Bernd Schneider	Zakspeed				
DNQ	23	(Spain) Adrián Campos	Minardi-Ford				
DNQ	4	(United Kingdom) Julian Bailey	Tyrrell-Ford				
EX	33	(Italy) Stefano Modena	EuroBrun-Ford		Missed weight check		

== Championship standings after the race ==
Drivers' Championship standings

Pos	Driver	Points
1	(France) Alain Prost	24
2	(Austria) Gerhard Berger	14
3	(Brazil) Ayrton Senna	9
4	(Brazil) Nelson Piquet	8
5	(Italy) Michele Alboreto	6

Constructors' Championship standings

Pos	Constructor	Points
1	(United Kingdom) McLaren-Honda	33
2	(Italy) Ferrari	20
3	(United Kingdom) Lotus-Honda	9
4	(United Kingdom) Arrows-Megatron	6
5	(United Kingdom) Benetton-Ford	4

- Note: Only the top five positions are included for both sets of standings.

Previous race: 1988 San Marino Grand Prix	FIA Formula One World Championship; 1988 season	Next race: 1988 Mexican Grand Prix
Previous race: 1987 Monaco Grand Prix	Monaco Grand Prix	Next race: 1989 Monaco Grand Prix
