= Enzo Osella =

Italian Formula One team owner (1939–2025)

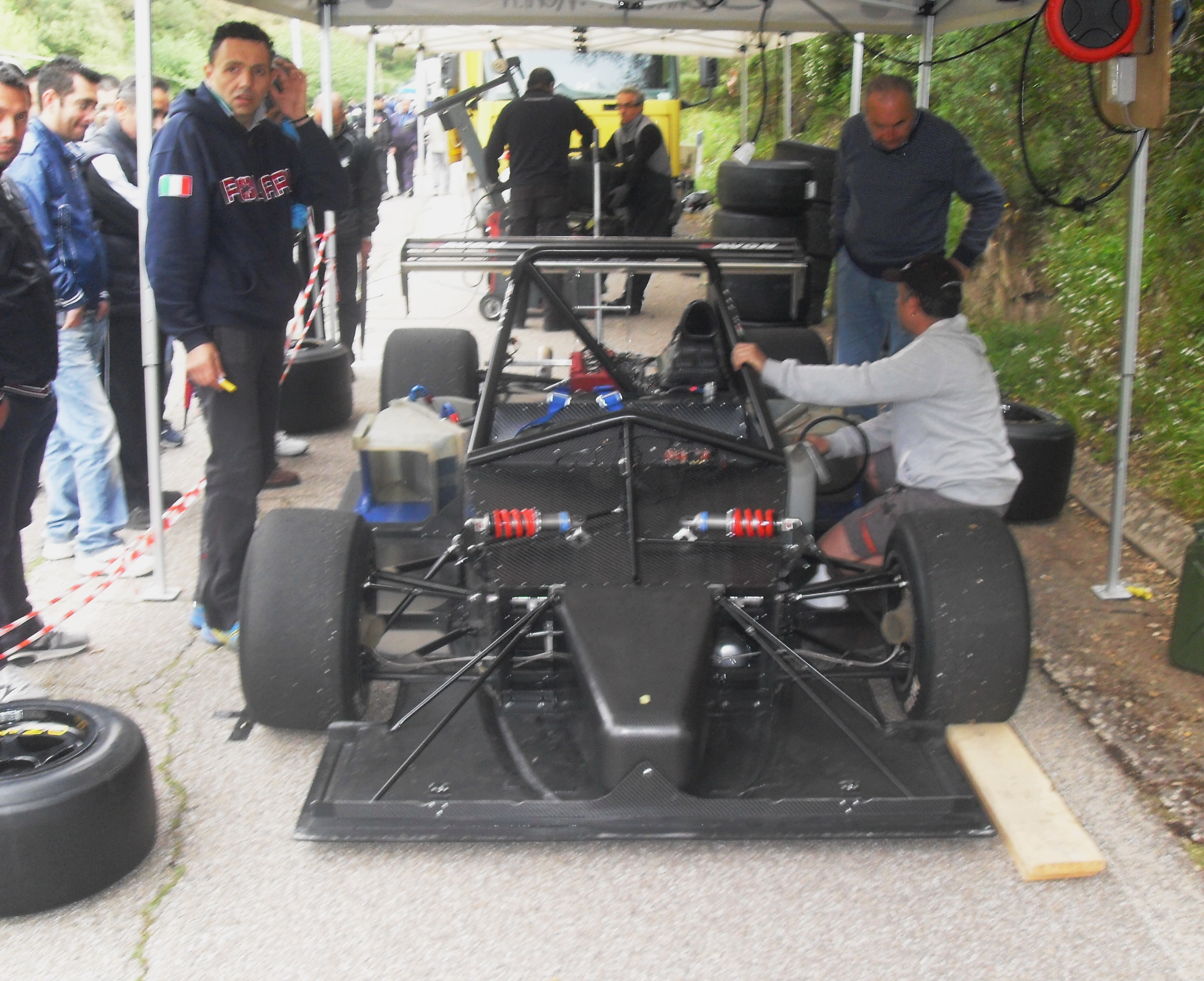
Osella (right, standing) at the Iglesias-Sant'Angelo hillclimb in 2013

Vincenzo "Enzo" Osella (26 August 1939 – 27 September 2025) was an Italian racing driver and team owner. He was the founder and chairman of Italian auto manufacturer Osella. The team competed in Formula One between 1980 and 1990.

== Life and career ==
Enzo Osella was born in Volpiano, near Turin, to Luigi and Maria Osella. His parents ran a grocery store and a transport company in Volpiano until the end of the Second World War. After the war Luigi Osella took over a garage in the centre of Turin. Enzo Osella first job out of school was in a gravel plant. He then started helping his father at the garage by working on the customers' cars.

One of his father's regular client was an amateur rally driver who enticed Enzo to assist him as navigator. From 1957 Osella competed as co-driver in several events, including the Sestriere Rally. Osella later switched to the driver seat and borrowed his sister's Fiat 600 to race. He then purchased a Lotus 11, which he modified according to his own wishes and equipped with an Osca engine and an Alfa Romeo differential, and took part in hillclimb races.

In 1963 Carlo Abarth invited Osella to replace Mario Poltronieri as test driver for Abarth's racing cars and motorsport team in Turin. The experience gave Osella the opportunity to earn insight into chassis and engine production and tuning aspects. Osella also worked as a mechanic and driver supervisor.

At the end of 1964 Enzo Osella went into business for himself and took over an Abarth factory agency in Turin. In 1971 Carlo Abarth sold the name rights and production facilities to Fiat and retired to Vienna. Osella purchased the entire racing department, and started operating it under the name Osella Corse. After a few years spent competing mostly in hillclimbing, Can Am, Formula Three, and Formula Two, in 1980 Osella established a Formula One team. The Osella team participated in 132 Grands Prix, achieving three top-six finishes and scoring five world championship points.

In 1990 Osella retired from Formula One and relocated his team to Verolengo, in the Turin metropolitan area, to focus again on sports car and hillclimb races.

=== Personal life and death ===
Enzo Osella was married and had two children, a boy and a girl. His son died in 1991.

Osella died on 27 September 2025, at the age of 86.
