= 1983 San Marino Grand Prix =

- Race 4 of 15 in the 1983 Formula One World Championship
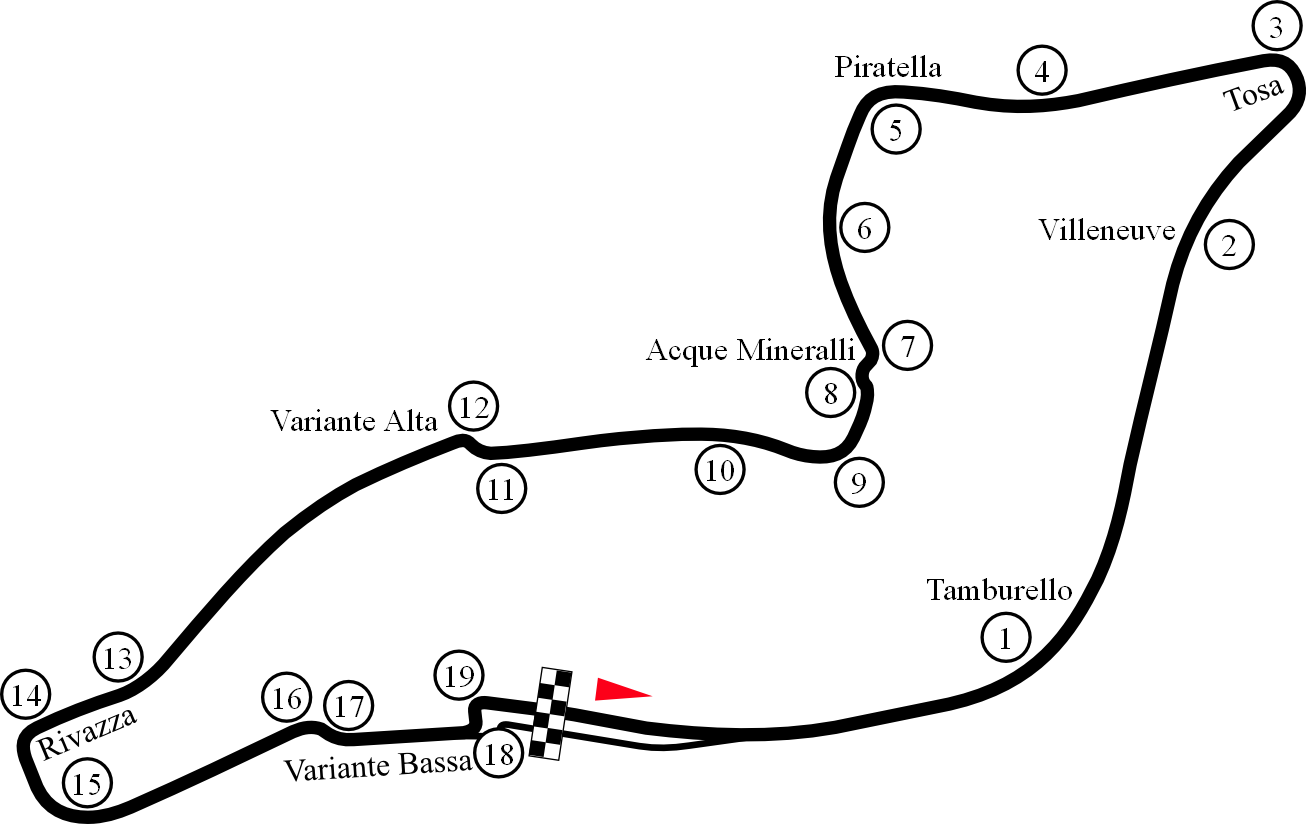

Race details
- Date: 1 May 1983
- Location: Autodromo Dino Ferrari; Imola, Emilia-Romagna, Italy
- Course: Permanent racing facility
- Course length: 5.040 km (3.132 miles)
- Distance: 60 laps, 302.400 km (187.902 miles)

Pole position
Driver	(France) René Arnoux	Ferrari
- Time: 1:31.238

Fastest lap
Driver	(Italy) Riccardo Patrese	Brabham-BMW
- Time: 1:34.427 on lap 47

Podium
First	(France) Patrick Tambay	Ferrari
Second	(France) Alain Prost	Renault
Third	(France) René Arnoux	Ferrari

The 1983 San Marino Grand Prix was a Formula One motor race held at Imola on 1 May 1983. It was the fourth race of the 1983 Formula One World Championship.

Patrick Tambay took a popular victory in his Ferrari in front of a delighted Tifosi. Driving the #27 car, Tambay dedicated his win to the man he had replaced in the Ferrari team, the late Gilles Villeneuve. It was almost a perfect weekend for the Maranello-based team with René Arnoux qualifying on pole and finishing third. Renault's Alain Prost finished in second place, passing Arnoux with three laps left after the #28 Ferrari spun at the Acque Minerali chicane.

Brabham driver Riccardo Patrese had taken the lead from Tambay with six laps remaining, but only held the lead for half a lap before crashing at Acque Minerali. He later described the accident as "purely my mistake". Showing their love for Ferrari more than for an Italian driver in a non-Italian car, the Tifosi cheered as Patrese handed the lead back to Frenchman Tambay in his Ferrari to take his second and last F1 victory.

This would be the last time that Ferrari founder Enzo Ferrari saw his Formula One team score a victory in person. 85 years old at the time of the 1983 San Marino Grand Prix, Enzo never attended races outside Italy anymore, and Ferrari would not win again on Italian soil again until the month after Enzo died in August 1988. Ferrari would not win at Imola again until Michael Schumacher in 1999. This was the most recent event where all three drivers on the podium were of the same nationality, until the 2026 Barcelona-Catalunya Grand Prix, 43 years later.

== Classification ==
=== Qualifying ===
Pos	No	Driver	Constructor	Q1	Q2	Gap
1	28	(France) René Arnoux	Ferrari	1:33.419	1:31.238	—
2	5	(Brazil) Nelson Piquet	Brabham-BMW	1:33.542	1:31.964	+0.726
3	27	(France) Patrick Tambay	Ferrari	1:34.221	1:31.967	+0.729
4	15	(France) Alain Prost	Renault	1:33.653	1:32.138	+0.900
5	6	(Italy) Riccardo Patrese	Brabham-BMW	1:36.243	1:32.969	+1.731
6	16	(United States) Eddie Cheever	Renault	1:33.888	1:33.450	+2.212
7	9	(West Germany) Manfred Winkelhock	ATS-BMW	1:35.010	1:33.470	+2.232
8	22	(Italy) Andrea de Cesaris	Alfa Romeo	1:34.345	1:33.528	+2.290
9	11	(Italy) Elio de Angelis	Lotus-Renault	1:35.091	1:34.332	+3.094
10	23	(Italy) Mauro Baldi	Alfa Romeo	1:35.000	1:36.620	+3.762
11	1	(Finland) Keke Rosberg	Williams-Ford	1:36.145	1:35.086	+3.848
12	29	(Switzerland) Marc Surer	Arrows-Ford	1:35.723	1:35.411	+4.173
13	3	(Italy) Michele Alboreto	Tyrrell-Ford	1:35.988	1:35.525	+4.287
14	35	(United Kingdom) Derek Warwick	Toleman-Hart	1:35.676	1:36.881	+4.438
15	12	(United Kingdom) Nigel Mansell	Lotus-Ford	1:36.391	1:35.703	+4.465
16	2	(France) Jacques Laffite	Williams-Ford	1:36.630	1:35.707	+4.469
17	36	(Italy) Bruno Giacomelli	Toleman-Hart	1:35.969	no time	+4.731
18	8	(Austria) Niki Lauda	McLaren-Ford	1:38.089	1:36.099	+4.861
19	25	(France) Jean-Pierre Jarier	Ligier-Ford	1:37.544	1:36.116	+4.878
20	30	(Brazil) Chico Serra	Arrows-Ford	1:37.337	1:36.258	+5.020
21	33	(Colombia) Roberto Guerrero	Theodore-Ford	1:36.792	1:36.324	+5.086
22	4	(United States) Danny Sullivan	Tyrrell-Ford	1:37.320	1:36.359	+5.121
23	34	(Venezuela) Johnny Cecotto	Theodore-Ford	1:37.554	1:36.638	+5.400
24	7	(United Kingdom) John Watson	McLaren-Ford	1:37.847	1:36.652	+5.414
25	26	(Brazil) Raul Boesel	Ligier-Ford	1:39.435	1:37.332	+6.094
26	31	(Italy) Corrado Fabi	Osella-Ford	1:37.952	1:37.711	+6.473
27	17	(Chile) Eliseo Salazar	RAM-Ford	1:38.691	1:38.091	+6.853
28	32	(Italy) Piercarlo Ghinzani	Osella-Alfa Romeo	1:39.248	1:38.873	+7.635

=== Race ===
Pos	No	Driver	Constructor	Tyre	Laps	Time/Retired	Grid	Points
1	27	(France) Patrick Tambay	Ferrari	G	60	1:37:52.460	3	9
2	15	(France) Alain Prost	Renault	MI	60	+ 48.781	4	6
3	28	(France) René Arnoux	Ferrari	G	59	+ 1 Lap	1	4
4	1	(Finland) Keke Rosberg	Williams-Ford	G	59	+ 1 Lap	11	3
5	7	(United Kingdom) John Watson	McLaren-Ford	MI	59	+ 1 Lap	24	2
6	29	(Switzerland) Marc Surer	Arrows-Ford	G	59	+ 1 Lap	12	1
7	2	(France) Jacques Laffite	Williams-Ford	G	59	+ 1 Lap	16	
8	30	(Brazil) Chico Serra	Arrows-Ford	G	58	+ 2 Laps	20	
9	26	(Brazil) Raul Boesel	Ligier-Ford	MI	58	+ 2 Laps	25	
10	23	(Italy) Mauro Baldi	Alfa Romeo	MI	57	Engine	10	
11	9	(West Germany) Manfred Winkelhock	ATS-BMW	G	57	+ 3 Laps	7	
12	12	(United Kingdom) Nigel Mansell	Lotus-Ford	P	56	Spun Off	15	
Ret	6	(Italy) Riccardo Patrese	Brabham-BMW	MI	54	Spun Off	5	
Ret	22	(Italy) Andrea de Cesaris	Alfa Romeo	MI	45	Ignition	8	
Ret	11	(Italy) Elio de Angelis	Lotus-Renault	P	43	Handling	9	
Ret	5	(Brazil) Nelson Piquet	Brabham-BMW	MI	41	Engine	2	
Ret	25	(France) Jean-Pierre Jarier	Ligier-Ford	MI	39	Radiator	19	
Ret	4	(United States) Danny Sullivan	Tyrrell-Ford	G	37	Collision	22	
Ret	35	(United Kingdom) Derek Warwick	Toleman-Hart	P	27	Spun Off	14	
Ret	31	(Italy) Corrado Fabi	Osella-Ford	MI	20	Spun Off	26	
Ret	36	(Italy) Bruno Giacomelli	Toleman-Hart	P	20	Suspension	17	
Ret	8	(Austria) Niki Lauda	McLaren-Ford	MI	11	Spun Off	18	
Ret	34	(Venezuela) Johnny Cecotto	Theodore-Ford	G	11	Spun Off	23	
Ret	3	(Italy) Michele Alboreto	Tyrrell-Ford	G	10	Collision	13	
Ret	33	(Colombia) Roberto Guerrero	Theodore-Ford	G	3	Spun Off	21	
Ret	16	(United States) Eddie Cheever	Renault	MI	1	Turbo	6	
DNQ	17	(Chile) Eliseo Salazar	RAM-Ford	P				
DNQ	32	(Italy) Piercarlo Ghinzani	Osella-Alfa Romeo	MI				

== Championship standings after the race ==
Drivers' Championship standings

Pos	Driver	Points
1	(France) Alain Prost	15
2	(Brazil) Nelson Piquet	15
3	(France) Patrick Tambay	14
4	(United Kingdom) John Watson	11
5	(Austria) Niki Lauda	10

Constructors' Championship standings

Pos	Constructor	Points
1	(Italy) Ferrari	22
2	(United Kingdom) McLaren-Ford	21
3	(France) Renault	19
4	(United Kingdom) Brabham-BMW	15
5	(United Kingdom) Williams-Ford	12

- Note: Only the top five positions are included for both sets of standings.

Previous race: 1983 French Grand Prix	FIA Formula One World Championship; 1983 season	Next race: 1983 Monaco Grand Prix
Previous race: 1982 San Marino Grand Prix	San Marino Grand Prix	Next race: 1984 San Marino Grand Prix
