= Verolengo =

- Comune
- Comune di Verolengo
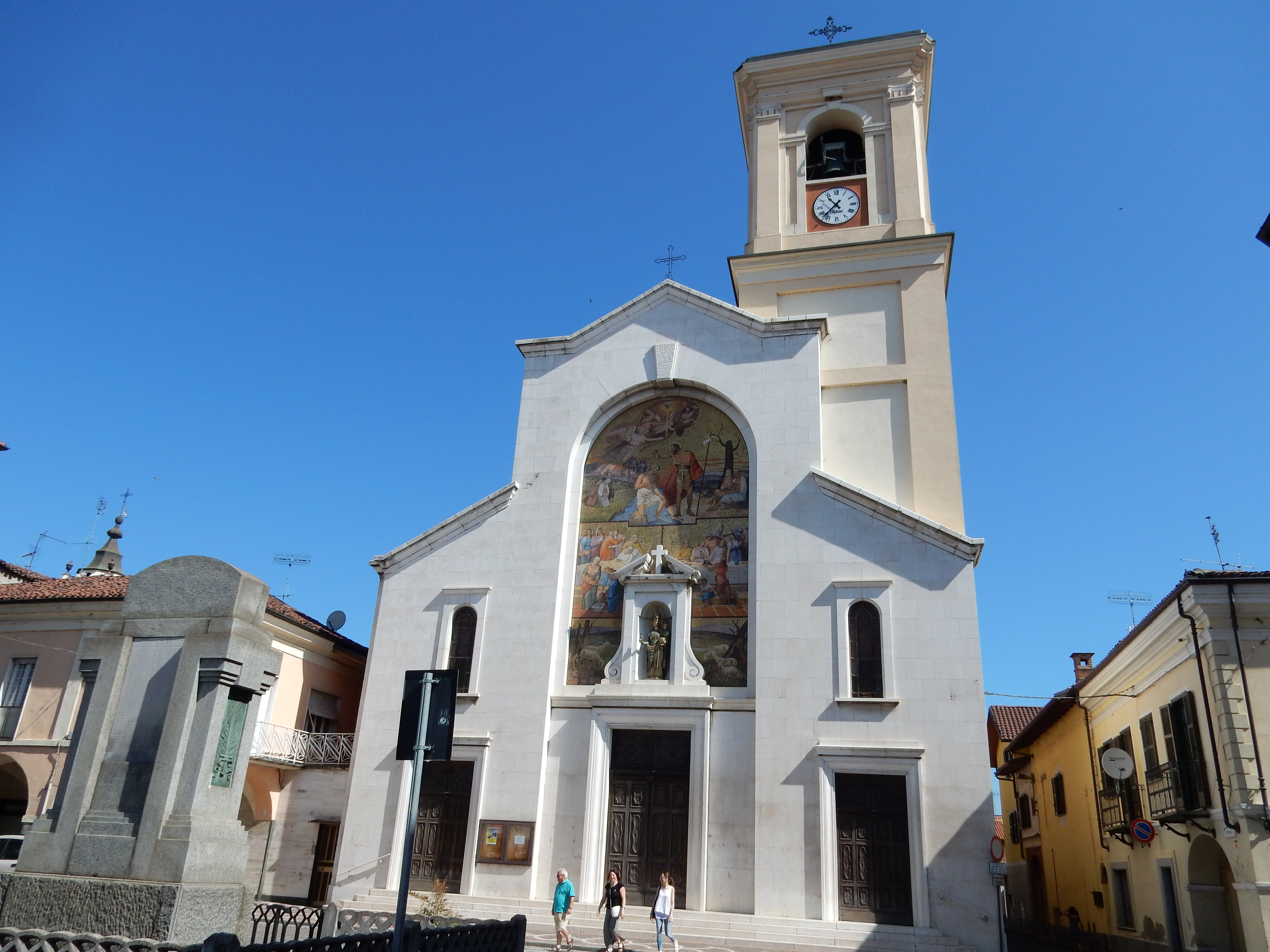
- Parish church of St. John the Baptist.

- Coat of arms

- Location within Italy Location within Piedmont
- Coordinates: 45°11′N 7°58′E
- Country: Italy
- Region: Piedmont
- Metropolitan city: Turin (TO)
- Frazioni: Arborea, Benne, Borgo Revel, Busignetto, Casabianca, Madonnina, Rolandini, Sbarro Valentino

Government
  - Mayor: Rosanna Giachello

Area
  - Total: 29.2 km^{2} (11.3 sq mi)
- Elevation: 169 m (554 ft)

Population (31 December 2014)
  - Total: 4,986
  - Density: 171/km^{2} (442/sq mi)
- Demonym: Verolenghesi
- Time zone: UTC+1 (CET)
  - Summer (DST): UTC+2 (CEST)
- Postal code: 10038
- Dialing code: 011
- Website: Official website

Verolengo is a comune (municipality) in the Metropolitan City of Turin in the Italian region Piedmont, located about 25 kilometres (16 mi) northeast of Turin.

== Origin ==
The origin of the name Verolengo seems to be linked to the numerous pig farms (verro, also present on the coat of arms) of the territory. According to other interpretations, the verro on the coat of arms was chosen by assonance with the name of the municipality, which would be linked to ancient settlements of the barbarian population of the Eruli (hence Verulengum). One of the historical associations of the town (the Erulia Association) took its name from the origins of the place.

== Film location ==
Verolengo is very often a film and television set. Among the many films we remember Assassin Club by Camille Delamarre

== Monuments and places of interest ==
=== The Sanctuary of the Madonnina ===
The Sanctuary of the Madonnina is located in the homonymous hamlet (the Madonnina). Splendid example of neoclassical architecture. Traces of its origin are hidden inside. At the center of the high altar, above the tabernacle, stands a small fresco, depicting the Madonna with Child, most likely the Blessed Virgin of Oropa, due to its dark color, with S. Carlo Borromeo on the left and on the right St. Anthony of Padua. By an unknown artist, it already existed at the end of the seventeenth century: at that time, the painting constituted the upper part of one of the many pillars that, even today, can be found in our countryside. The simulacrum is at the origin of both the sanctuary and its thaumaturgical fame. Tradition has it that a priest, a certain Don Bracco, was thrown from the saddle by the runaway horse and, with one foot entangled in a stirrup, was dragged for a long distance, until, right in front of the pylon, the animal stopped and the priest, who remained miraculously unharmed despite the bad adventure, thanked the Virgin for the narrow escape; as a sign of gratitude he had the sign included inside a chapel. However, it soon became insufficient for the great competition of the faithful and devotees and therefore was demolished and enlarged. The need for an even more capacious building became pressing at the end of the eighteenth century, but the works, although begun, did not proceed for many reasons and resumed only a few decades later, starting in 1834; continued, with interruptions, until 1851, when the church was consecrated by Mons.Moreno, bishop of Ivrea and ended definitively in 1861, the year in which the large entrance door was placed, built at the expense of the then parish priest Don Viora.

=== Church of San Giovanni Battista ===
The church of San Giovanni Battista is located in the main square of the town (Piazza IV Novembre) which represents the interjunction between the decumanus and cardo of the ancient Roman camp). On the square, opposite the oldest house in the town, which tradition and history say belong to the Roman governor. The church, in neoclassical style, is structured on three naves and is covered externally with white marble even if originally the facade was in exposed brick. The bell tower has a solid and imposing figure and is equipped with an electromechanical clock with four dials. Inside, numerous altars decorate the side walls. They are dedicated to Santa Apollonia, Santa Lucia, Sant’Agata, and Santa Libera, followed by the one dedicated to the Madonna del Rosario, to Sant’Orsola and, in the back wall of the nave, to Santa Maria Assunta. On the opposite side, that is to the right of the main altar and on the back wall of the same nave, you can see the altar dedicated to San Sebastiano, then that of San Nicola, then the altars of the Sacred Heart, of San Giuseppe and finally of Sant 'Anthony of Padua. Also worthy of attention is the via crucis, the work of the Verolenghese painters Amedeo and Francesco Augero. The church was originally dedicated to Santa Maria di Piazza (or degli Angeli) and only in the 19th century was it dedicated to San Giovanni Battista, patron saint of the town.

=== Church of San Michele ===
This church is in Piedmontese Baroque style and overlooks the rectory of the church of San Giovanni Battista. There are no documents that tell us the story of its construction even if the date 1523 is engraved at the base of the main altar. The interior is a single nave, very collected, houses the crucifix that is carried in procession through the streets of the village on the evening of Good Friday. To the right of the entrance, a newsstand houses the image of a smiling infant: it is Maria Child, protector of children, to whom the bows of the newborns of the village are brought as an ex voto. The church is also home to a brotherhood of the same name that takes care of its maintenance: the brothers are commemorated in periodic masses in which they pray for the salvation of their souls.

=== The Church of the Holy Trinity ===
The church of the Holy Trinity in Baroque style was built in 1744 thanks to the support of the Verulfo counts, based on a design by the architect Carlo Cerrone who probably elaborated a design by Juvarra. The interior is very simple, structured in a single nave and an imposing painting by Amedeo Augero finds space in the choir. Pope Paul V granted the plenary indulgence to those who went on pilgrimage to this church. The church is also home to a brotherhood of the same name that takes care of its maintenance: the brothers are commemorated in periodic masses in which they pray for the salvation of their souls.

=== The Tower of the Violinist girl ===
The Tower of the Violinist girl is located in the Madonnina hamlet. It is a building built around the year 1000. The name by which it is known derives from a curious legend that has as its protagonist a noble girl who is passionate about the violin locked up there by her father for falling in love with a commoner (perhaps a stable boy). Another legend speaks of mysterious underground passages that would connect the building with other historical sites in the area. Among the guests who would have stayed in the building we remember Oscar Marlier, a Belgian traveling adventurer who had rented it for a while in the early decades of the 1900s. A passionate collector of postcards he filled the walls of which now only remain ruined papers (among which the most in good condition is a calendar from 1917). Currently the building is owned by the Rosa-Tione spouses. The building appears in various movies, including NFDMT, Lethal At(t)raction, In the Shadow of the Tower, Lake Puntura (aka Lago Puntura).

== People linked to Verolengo ==
- Paolo Thaon di Revel, admiral and politician
- Francesco Crispi, patriot and politician
