= Rial ARC1 =

Formula One racing car

- 1988 Rial ARC1 at Spa-Francorchamps in 2026
- Category: Formula One
- Constructor: Rial Racing
- Designer: Gustav Brunner (Chief Designer)
- Successor: Rial ARC2

Technical specifications
- Chassis: Carbon fibre monocoque
- Axle track: Front: 1,800 mm (71 in); Rear: 1,600 mm (63 in)
- Wheelbase: 2,800 mm (110 in)
- Engine: Ford-Cosworth DFZ 3,494 cc (213.2 cu in), 90° V8, NA, mid-engine, longitudinally mounted
- Transmission: Rial 6-speed manual
- Weight: 500 kg (1,100 lb)
- Fuel: STP
- Tyres: Goodyear

Competition history
- Notable entrants: Rial Racing
- Notable drivers: (Italy) Andrea de Cesaris
- Debut: 1988 Brazilian Grand Prix
| Races | Wins | Poles | F/Laps |
|---|---|---|---|
| 16 | 0 | 0 | 0 |
- Constructors' Championships: 0
- Drivers' Championships: 0

The Rial ARC1 was a Formula One racing car manufactured and raced by Rial Racing for the 1988 Formula One season. It was powered by a Cosworth DFZ V8 engine. Its best finish was at the 1988 United States Grand Prix when Andrea de Cesaris drove it to fourth place.

== Development ==
Rial Racing was established by German industrialist Günter Schmid, who had previous experience of Formula One with ATS Racing, to participate in the 1988 season. He contracted former Ferrari engineer Gustav Brunner to design a car based around the Cosworth DFZ V8 engine.

The car, designated the ARC1, was similar in appearance in Brunner's Ferrari F1/87 and was known as 'the Blue Ferrari', though the ARC1 featured a different engine cover owing to different sized engine and fuel tank, as well as lower sidepods than the Ferrari due to not having to house turbochargers. Brunner gave the car a unique front suspension arrangement with its dampers positioned longitudinally at the height of the floor. Rial also developed its own gearbox for the ARC1. A total of three cars were built.

== Racing history ==
Rial Racing ran a single entry throughout the season for the experienced but erratic Italian Andrea de Cesaris who also brought much needed money to the team through his personal Marlboro sponsorship. For the season opening race in 1988 Brazilian Grand Prix, de Cesaris qualified 14th but retired during the race itself with engine trouble. At one stage, he was running in 6th place before he stopped for tires. De Cesaris had no problems qualifying the ARC1 for every race of the season and would regularly run in the midfield. Its best qualifying was 12th, achieved five times.

Reliability though was poor and by the end of the season, he had only been classified in five races and even in two of these, he was not running at the finish due to running out of fuel (the ARC1 was known to have the smallest fuel tank of the atmospheric cars in 1988). However, one finish was fourth on the streets of Detroit where de Cesaris managed to stay out of trouble and quietly moved into the points as the crumbling track surface and the heat took its toll on the field. Finishing fourth in the last ever F1 race in Detroit earned the team three points. The fuel issue actually robbed de Cesaris and the team of at least 2 points through the season with the ARC1 running out of fuel while in 5th place in the final round of the season in Adelaide, Australia.

== Performance ==
in the 21/1988 Autozeitung they found the Rial ARC1 had a performance of:

| 0 - 40 kph | 0.6 s |
| 0 - 100 kph | 2.3 s |
| 0 - 140 kph | 4.0 s |
| 0 - 200 kph | 6.8 s |
| 1/4 mile | 9.6 s |

In comparison to a test done by German magazine Sport auto, the Rial ARC1 and its 3.5L, naturally aspirated Ford-Cosworth DFZ V8 engine took 1.2 seconds longer to reach 200 kph than the 1988 season's all conquering car, the McLaren MP4/4 with its 1.5L, turbocharged Honda V6 engine. The Rial was actually quicker from 0 - 100 kph (The McLaren Honda was timed at 2.8 seconds), but from there the greater power and torque of the turbo Honda kicked in and the McLaren accelerated faster.

== Complete Formula One results ==
(key) (results in bold indicate pole position; results in italics indicate fastest lap)

| Year | Entrant | Engine | Tyres | Drivers | 1 | 2 | 3 | 4 | 5 | 6 | 7 | 8 | 9 | 10 | 11 | 12 | 13 | 14 | 15 | 16 | Points | WCC |
|---|---|---|---|---|---|---|---|---|---|---|---|---|---|---|---|---|---|---|---|---|---|---|
| 1988 | Rial Racing | Ford DFZ 3.5 V8 | **G** | | BRA | SMR | MON | MEX | CAN | DET | FRA | GBR | GER | HUN | BEL | ITA | POR | ESP | JPN | AUS | **3** | **9th** |
| 1988 | Rial Racing | Ford DFZ 3.5 V8 | **G** | Andrea de Cesaris | Ret | Ret | Ret | Ret | 9† | 4 | 10 | Ret | 13 | Ret | Ret | Ret | Ret | Ret | Ret | 8† | **3** | **9th** |

† classified but not running at finish
