= Pierre-Henri Raphanel =

French racing driver (born 1961)

- Raphanel driving for Coloni at the 1989 Monaco Grand Prix
- Born: 27 May 1961 (age 65); Algiers, Algeria

Formula One World Championship career
- Nationality: (France) French
- Active years: 1988–1989
- Team(s): Larrousse, Coloni, Rial
- Entries: 17 (1 start)
- Championships: 0
- Wins: 0
- Podiums: 0
- Career points: 0
- Pole positions: 0
- Fastest laps: 0
- First entry: 1988 Australian Grand Prix
- Last entry: 1989 Australian Grand Prix

24 Hours of Le Mans career
- Years: 1986-2000
- Teams: Courage, Porsche, Toyota, Peugeot, McLaren, Panoz
- Best finish: 2nd (1992), (1997)
- Class wins: 1 (1997)

Championship titles
- 1985: French Formula Three Championship

Pierre-Henri Raphanel (born 27 May 1961) is a French former racing driver.

Raphanel participated in 17 Formula One Grands Prix for Larrousse, Coloni and Rial, debuting on 13 November 1988. He only qualified for one race, the 1989 Monaco Grand Prix, making him the only driver in F1 history whose only race was in the principality.

Following his F1 career, Raphanel became a factory driver for Toyota, competing in Japan for series such as JTCC and JGTC, for the latter until 2000. After 2006, Raphanel worked as the lead test driver and product specialist for Bugatti and is usually seen demonstrating the Veyron.

Raphanel is also the uncle of the French-Algerian driver Julien Gerbi and of the young go-kart driver Arthur Raphanel.

Raphanel drove the Bugatti Veyron Super Sport to its maximum speed (431.072 km/h) in Ehra-Lessien in July 2010.

== Racing record ==
=== Complete Macau Grand Prix results ===
Year	Team	Chassis/Engine	Qualifying	Race1	Race2	Overall ranking	Ref
1985	(France) Oreca	Martini・Alfa Romeo	24th	13	DNF	16th	

=== 24 Hours of Le Mans results ===
Year	Team	Co-Drivers	Car	Class	Laps	Pos.	Class Pos.
1986	(France) Primagaz Team Cougar	(France) Yves Courage (United Kingdom) Alain de Cadenet	Cougar C12-Porsche	C1	267	18th	11th
1987	(France) Primagaz Competition	(France) Yves Courage (Belgium) Hervé Regout	Courage C20-Porsche	C1	332	**3rd**	**3rd**
1988	(France) Primagaz Competition	(France) Michel Ferté	Cougar C20B-Porsche	C1	120	DNF	DNF
1989	(Germany) Joest Racing	(Germany) Frank Jelinski (Germany) Louis Krages	Porsche 962C	C1	124	DNF	DNF
1990	(Japan) Toyota Team SARD	(Austria) Roland Ratzenberger (Japan) Naoki Nagasaka	Toyota 90C-V	C1	241	DNF	DNF
1991	(France) Peugeot Talbot Sport	(Finland) Keke Rosberg (France) Yannick Dalmas	Peugeot 905	C1	68	DNF	DNF
1992	(Japan) Toyota Team Tom's	(Japan) Masanori Sekiya (United Kingdom) Kenny Acheson	Toyota TS010	C1	346	**2nd**	**2nd**
1993	(Japan) Toyota Team Tom's	(United Kingdom) Kenny Acheson (United Kingdom) Andy Wallace	Toyota TS010	C1	212	DNF	DNF
1994	(France) Courage Compétition	(France) Lionel Robert (France) Pascal Fabre	Courage C32LM-Porsche	LMP1 /C90	107	DNF	DNF
1995	(United Kingdom) GTC Gulf Racing	(France) Philippe Alliot (United Kingdom) Lindsay Owen-Jones	McLaren F1 GTR	GT1	77	DNF	DNF
1996	(United Kingdom) Gulf Racing (United Kingdom) GTC Racing	(United Kingdom) Lindsay Owen-Jones (Australia) David Brabham	McLaren F1 GTR	GT1	335	5th	4th
1997	(United Kingdom) Gulf Team Davidoff (United Kingdom) GTC Racing	(France) Jean-Marc Gounon (Sweden) Anders Olofsson	McLaren F1 GTR	GT1	360	**2nd**	**1st**
1998	(Germany) Porsche AG (Germany) Joest Racing	(United States) David Murry (United Kingdom) James Weaver	Porsche LMP1-98	LMP1	218	DNF	DNF
2000	(United States) Panoz Motorsports	(United States) Johnny O'Connell (Japan) Hiroki Katoh	Panoz LMP-1 Roadster-S	LMP900	342	5th	5th

=== Complete International Formula 3000 Championship results ===
(key)

Year	Entrant	Chassis	Engine	1	2	3	4	5	6	7	8	9	10	11	WDC	Points
1986	Oreca Motorsport	March 86B	Cosworth	SIL; Ret	VLL; 14	PAU; Ret	SPA; 6	IMO; 15	MUG; 8	PER; 7	ÖST; 12	BIR; Ret	BUG; 3	JAR; 15	12th	5
1987	Onyx Racing	March 87B	Cosworth	SIL; 16	VLL; 4	SPA; 8	**PAU**; Ret	DON; 3	PER; Ret	BRH; Ret	BIR; Ret	IMO; Ret	BUG; 14	JAR; Ret	13th	7
1988	Oreca Motorsport	March 88B	Cosworth	JER; 15	VLL; 18										14th	8
1988	Oreca Motorsport	Reynard 88D	Cosworth			PAU; 6	SIL; 3	MNZ; Ret	PER; 5	BRH; DNS	BIR; Ret	BUG; 6	ZOL; Ret	DIJ; 12	14th	8

=== Complete Formula One results ===
(key)

Year	Entrant	Chassis	Engine	1	2	3	4	5	6	7	8	9	10	11	12	13	14	15	16	WDC	Points
1988	Larrousse Calmels	Lola LC88	Cosworth V8	BRA	SMR	MON	MEX	CAN	DET	FRA	GBR	GER	HUN	BEL	ITA	POR	ESP	JPN	AUS; DNQ	NC	0
1989	Coloni SpA	Coloni FC188B	Cosworth V8	BRA; DNPQ	SMR; DNPQ	MON; Ret	MEX; DNPQ	USA; DNPQ												NC	0
1989	Coloni SpA	Coloni C3	Cosworth V8						CAN; DNPQ	FRA; DNPQ	GBR; DNPQ	GER; DNPQ	HUN; DNPQ							NC	0
1989	Rial Racing	Rial ARC2	Cosworth V8											BEL; DNQ	ITA; DNQ	POR; DNQ	ESP; DNQ	JPN; DNQ	AUS; DNQ	NC	0

=== Complete FIA GT Championship results ===
Year	Team	Car	Class	1	2	3	4	5	6	7	8	9	10	11	DC	Pts
1997	Gulf Team Davidoff	McLaren F1 GTR	GT1	HOC; 2	SIL; 4	HEL; 4	NÜR; 5	SPA; Ret	A1R; 5	SUZ; 3	DON; 6	MUG; 6	SEB; 5	LAG; 4	7th	27

=== Complete JGTC results ===
(key) (Races in bold indicate pole position) (Races in italics indicate fastest lap)

Year	Team	Car	Class	1	2	3	4	5	6	7	DC	Pts	Ref
1998	Inging	Toyota Supra	GT500	SUZ; Ret	FUJ	SEN; Ret	FUJ; 13	MOT; Ret	MIN; 6	SUG; DNQ	18th	6	
1999	Matsumotokiyoshi Team Tom's	Toyota Supra	GT500	SUZ; 13	FUJ; Ret	SUG; 2	MIN; 14	FUJ; 13	TAI; 6	MOT; 6	16th	27	
2000	MatsumotoKiyoshi Team Tom's	Toyota Supra	GT500	MOT; 12	FUJ; Ret	SUG; 3	FUJ; 13	TAI; 9	MIN; Ret	SUZ; 7	14th	18	

Sporting positions
Preceded by Ivan Capelli	Monaco Formula Three; Race Winner; 1985	Succeeded by Yannick Dalmas
Preceded by Olivier Grouillard	French Formula Three; Champion; 1985	Succeeded by Yannick Dalmas
