= Rial ARC2 =

Formula One racing car

- Category: Formula One
- Constructor: Rial Racing
- Designer: Stefan Fober
- Predecessor: Rial ARC1

Technical specifications
- Chassis: Carbon fibre/Kevlar monocoque
- Axle track: Front: 1,800 mm (71 in); Rear: 1,600 mm (63 in)
- Wheelbase: 2,800 mm (110 in)
- Engine: Ford-Cosworth DFR 3,494 cc (213.2 cu in), 90° V8, NA, mid-engine, longitudinally mounted
- Transmission: Rial 6-speed manual
- Weight: 500 kg (1,100 lb)
- Fuel: STP
- Tyres: Goodyear

Competition history
- Notable entrants: Rial Racing
- Notable drivers: (Germany) Christian Danner (Switzerland) Gregor Foitek (France) Bertrand Gachot (France) Pierre-Henri Raphanel (Germany) Volker Weidler
- Debut: 1989 Brazilian Grand Prix
Races	Wins	Poles	F/Laps
4	0	0	0
- Constructors' Championships: 0
- Drivers' Championships: 0

The Rial ARC2 was a Formula One racing car manufactured and raced by Rial Racing for the 1989 Formula One season. It was powered by a Cosworth DFR V8 engine. Its best finish was at the 1989 United States Grand Prix when Christian Danner drove it to fourth place.

== Development ==
Rial Racing had run the tidy Rial ARC1, designed by Gustav Brunner, in 1988 and had scored three points with it. For 1989, a new chassis, largely based on the previous year's car and designated the ARC2, was designed by Stefan Fober, with input from Bob Bell and Martin Goodrich. The chassis was configured with double wishbone pullrod suspension, front and rear, with Koni dampers. The wheelbase of the chassis was 2,840 millimetres (112 in) and it had a front track of 1,800 millimetres (71 in). The rear track was less, 1,600 millimetres (63 in).

The ARC2 was powered by the Cosworth DFR 3.5 litre V8 engine. The engine was rated as having 595 bhp with a maximum rpm of 11,000. A Lucas ignition system was used and the car ran on Goodyear tyres. It carried sponsorship from Rial, the parent company of Rial Racing, the tobacco brand Marlboro, and La Cinq. A total of three chassis were built for the 1989 season.

== Racing history ==
Having run a single car for Andrea de Cesaris the previous season, Rial Racing expanded to two entries for 1989. De Cesaris had moved to BMS Scuderia Italia for 1989 and was replaced with the relatively experienced German Christian Danner. Driving the second car was Formula One novice Volker Weidler.

Danner comfortably qualified his ARC2 17th on the grid at the season opening Brazilian Grand Prix and went on to be classified 14th in the race itself despite retiring with gear box issues. This proved to be the car's best qualifying performance all year; from hereon both drivers would struggle to qualify (pre-qualify in Weidler's case). Danner only managed to qualify for three more races, all in the early part of the season. He finished 12th in Monaco but followed this up at the next race in the United States with a finish in the points. From last on the grid, and benefiting from an attrition afflicted race, Danner finished in fourth place. At the next race he placed eighth but this proved to be the last classification for the ARC2.

Danner failed to make the grid for the next seven races and left the team after the Portuguese Grand Prix. His replacements, first Gregor Foitek for one race and Bertrand Gachot for the last two races of the year, both failed to make the race proper. Weidler, in the other car, did not pre-qualify for nine races and was excluded from a tenth. He was replaced by Pierre-Henri Raphanel who did not fare any better.

Danner's three points scored in the United States saw Rial Racing place 13th in the Constructors' Championship. Following the end of the season, the team withdrew from Formula One.

== Complete Formula One results ==
(key) (results in bold indicate pole position; results in italics indicate fastest lap)

Year	Entrant	Engine	Tyres	Drivers	1	2	3	4	5	6	7	8	9	10	11	12	13	14	15	16	Pts.	WCC
1989	Rial Racing	Ford DFZ 3.5 V8	G		BRA	SMR	MON	MEX	USA	CAN	FRA	GBR	GER	HUN	BEL	ITA	POR	ESP	JPN	AUS	3	13th
1989	Rial Racing	Ford DFZ 3.5 V8	G	Christian Danner	14*	DNQ	DNQ	12	4	8	DNQ	DNQ	DNQ	DNQ	DNQ	DNQ	DNQ				3	13th
1989	Rial Racing	Ford DFZ 3.5 V8	G	Volker Weidler	DNPQ	DNPQ	DNPQ	DNPQ	DNPQ	DNPQ	DNPQ	DNPQ	EX	DNQ							3	13th
1989	Rial Racing	Ford DFZ 3.5 V8	G	Pierre-Henri Raphanel											DNQ	DNQ	DNQ	DNQ	DNQ	DNQ	3	13th
1989	Rial Racing	Ford DFZ 3.5 V8	G	Gregor Foitek														DNQ			3	13th
1989	Rial Racing	Ford DFZ 3.5 V8	G	Bertrand Gachot															DNQ	DNQ	3	13th

* classified but not running at finish
