= Rial Racing =

Auto racing team

Rial
- Full name: Rial Racing
- Base: Fußgönheim, Rhineland-Palatinate, Germany
- Founder(s): Günter Schmid
- Noted staff: Günter Schmid, Gustav Brunner, Stefan Fober
- Noted drivers: (Italy) Andrea de Cesaris (Germany) Christian Danner

Formula One World Championship career
- First entry: 1988 Brazilian Grand Prix
- Races entered: 32
- Constructors' Championships: 0 (best finish: 9th, 1988)
- Drivers' Championships: 0
- Race victories: 0 (best finish: 4th, 1988 Detroit Grand Prix and 1989 United States Grand Prix)
- Pole positions: 0
- Fastest laps: 0
- Final entry: 1989 Australian Grand Prix

Rial is a German producer of light alloy wheels and rims, and was a Formula One constructor competing in the 1988 and 1989 seasons. Founded in the 1970s as a wheel rim producer, the company was bought by Günter Schmid, ex-owner of the ATS wheels company in 1987. Schmid followed the same strategy as he had at ATS, advertising the Rial wheel brand by entering Formula One as a constructor. Rial participated in 32 Grands Prix, entering a total of 48 cars. They scored six championship points, finishing a highest of ninth in the constructors championship in 1988. After leaving Formula One at the end of the 1989 season, the Rial Racing division was closed, and the company did not race again. Rial continues to manufacture wheels and rims from its factory in Fußgönheim.

The team was, together with the Zakspeed, one of the two last German Formula One teams based in Germany (with the Rial Racing's base in Fußgönheim).

== Racing history ==
Günter Schmid, ex-owner of the ATS company that competed in Formula One for eight years, bought Rial in 1987, ahead of the reduction in power of the turbo-engines in 1988, and set up a Formula One team at Rial's base in Fußgönheim. With old-ATS designer Gustav Brunner, Schmid produced the Rial ARC1, powered by a Cosworth DFZ engine, an updated model of the ubiquitous design of the pre-turbo seasons. The ARC1, nicknamed the "Blue Ferrari" due to the similarities with the Brunner-designed Ferrari F1/87, featured a double wishbone pullrod suspension, with shock absorbers innovatively placed horizontally against the chassis. Andrea de Cesaris, with Marlboro sponsorship was hired to drive the car, which proved strong in testing due to a small fuel tank.

At Rial's début race, the 1988 Brazilian Grand Prix, de Cesaris qualified 14th and reached sixth place in the race, but he ran out of fuel seven laps from the end. Mechanical failures occurred during the following races, and Rial twice breached regulations; for working on the car on-track and the drivers head being above the roll bar - necessitating a modification of the car. The fuel tank was again a problem in Canada where de Cesaris ran out of fuel in fifth place; however the next race in Detroit saw Rial finish in fourth place, scoring three points. After the French Grand Prix, the team's performance began to fall, and Brunner left the team after finishing 13th in their home race in Germany. Continuous mechanical problems and the fuel tank contributed to a six-race string of retirements, de Cesaris finishing the season classified 8th in Australia. The team finished in ninth place in the constructors championship, and Andrea de Cesaris was placed fifteenth in the drivers championship.

Rial expanded to two cars ahead of the 1989 season, and with de Cesaris moving to Dallara, German drivers Christian Danner and Volker Weidler were hired to drive the ARC2. Designed by new engineer Stefan Fober, the car was an updated version of the ARC1, with reworked aerodynamics by McLaren designer Bob Bell, and the improved Cosworth DFR engine being worked into the chassis. With turbo-charged engines banned for 1989, the entry list had increased to 39 cars from 20 teams; to accommodate the number of cars a pre-qualifying system was introduced, where the new cars and the teams ranked lowest in the previous season would compete for the 30 spaces available in qualifying, and then for the 26 starters in the race. Danner did not have to pre-qualify, while Weidler driving the new entry had to enter the session.

Danner achieved a 14th place at the opening Brazilian round, before the improving cars of Rial's competitors forced Danner out of qualifying for the next two races, hampered by the older ARC2 chassis. The fifth race, the United States Grand Prix on the Phoenix street circuit, saw Danner finish in fourth place, in a similar attritional race to the year before, giving him the best result of his career. Weidler meanwhile had failed to pre-qualify for any race so far in the season, and following Danner's 8th-place finish in Canada in what was to be Rial's final race start, neither driver qualified for the following Grands Prix, despite both Rial cars being allowed to enter qualifying following the changing of pre-qualifying rankings after the British Grand Prix. At the Hungarian race, where an illegal rear wing saw Weidler's qualifying times deleted, both Fober and Weidler left the team following the blame by Schmid for the imposed fine. Pierre-Henri Raphanel was his replacement, bringing with him new designer Christian van der Pleyn. However the new design team could not improve the ARC2 to qualify for a race, and Danner quit following the Portuguese Grand Prix. Gregor Foitek was brought in for Spain, but a rear wing breakage during qualifying caused an accident destroying his car, and he immediately left the team. Bertrand Gachot took over for the final two races, but neither Raphanel nor Gachot managed to qualify to race, with the outdated car several seconds off the nearest competitors in qualifying. Finishing 13th in the championship, Rial Racing closed down at the end of the year.

== Complete Formula One World Championship results ==
(key) (results in bold indicate pole position; results in italics indicate fastest lap)

Year	Chassis	Engine	Tyres	Drivers	1	2	3	4	5	6	7	8	9	10	11	12	13	14	15	16	Points	WCC
1988	ARC1	Ford Cosworth DFZ 3.5 V8	G		BRA	SMR	MON	MEX	CAN	DET	FRA	GBR	GER	HUN	BEL	ITA	POR	ESP	JPN	AUS	3	9th
1988	ARC1	Ford Cosworth DFZ 3.5 V8	G	(Italy) Andrea de Cesaris	Ret	Ret	Ret	Ret	9	4	10	Ret	13	Ret	Ret	Ret	Ret	Ret	Ret	8	3	9th
1989	ARC2	Ford Cosworth DFR 3.5 V8	G		BRA	SMR	MON	MEX	USA	CAN	FRA	GBR	GER	HUN	BEL	ITA	POR	ESP	JPN	AUS	3	13th
1989	ARC2	Ford Cosworth DFR 3.5 V8	G	(West Germany) Christian Danner	14†	DNQ	DNQ	12	4	8	DNQ	DNQ	DNQ	DNQ	DNQ	DNQ	DNQ				3	13th
1989	ARC2	Ford Cosworth DFR 3.5 V8	G	(Switzerland) Gregor Foitek														DNQ			3	13th
1989	ARC2	Ford Cosworth DFR 3.5 V8	G	(Belgium) Bertrand Gachot															DNQ	DNQ	3	13th
1989	ARC2	Ford Cosworth DFR 3.5 V8	G	(West Germany) Volker Weidler	DNPQ	DNPQ	DNPQ	DNPQ	DNPQ	DNPQ	DNPQ	DNPQ	EX	DNQ							3	13th
1989	ARC2	Ford Cosworth DFR 3.5 V8	G	(France) Pierre-Henri Raphanel											DNQ	DNQ	DNQ	DNQ	DNQ	DNQ	3	13th
