= 1988 Australian Grand Prix =

Race 16 of 16 in the 1988 Formula One World Championship
← Previous race	Next race →

Race details
- Date: 13 November 1988
- Official name: LIII Foster's Australian Grand Prix
- Location: Adelaide Street Circuit; Adelaide, South Australia
- Course: Temporary street circuit
- Course length: 3.780 km (2.362 miles)
- Distance: 82 laps, 309.960 km (193.684 miles)
- Weather: Cloudy and hot

Pole position
Driver	(Brazil) Ayrton Senna	McLaren-Honda
- Time: 1:17.748

Fastest lap
Driver	(France) Alain Prost	McLaren-Honda
- Time: 1:21.216 on lap 59

Podium
First	(France) Alain Prost	McLaren-Honda
Second	(Brazil) Ayrton Senna	McLaren-Honda
Third	(Brazil) Nelson Piquet	Lotus-Honda

The 1988 Australian Grand Prix was a Formula One motor race held at the Adelaide Street Circuit on 13 November 1988. It was the sixteenth and final race of the 1988 Formula One World Championship, and the last race for which turbocharged engines would be eligible until the 2014 Australian Grand Prix.

The 82-lap race was won by Frenchman Alain Prost, driving a McLaren-Honda. It was Prost's seventh victory of the season, and the McLaren team's fifteenth, a record for a constructor in a single season that would stand until 2014. Prost's Brazilian teammate and new World Champion Ayrton Senna finished second, having started from pole position, while Senna's compatriot and outgoing champion Nelson Piquet came third in a Lotus-Honda, achieving what would turn out to be the final podium finish for the original Team Lotus.

== Qualifying ==
As had become normal in 1988, qualifying was the domain of the McLaren-Hondas. Senna and Prost easily led the time sheets on both Friday and Saturday, with Prost initially fastest on Friday with a 1:18.179 lap, 0.153 ahead of his teammate. The pair traded pole laps in the second qualifying session, with Senna doing his usual act of snatching pole on the last lap of qualifying with a 1:17.748 lap, only 0.132 in front of his teammate, but 1.7 seconds faster than the next fastest car, Nigel Mansell in the Williams-Judd. During qualifying Senna was hampered by a sprained left wrist having injured it during a game of beach soccer in Bali, Indonesia, where he had taken a small holiday after winning the championship in Japan. His injury was such that there was speculation the teams test driver Emanuele Pirro would drive in his place, but the new World Champion refused to be sidelined and took his place in Adelaide, though he admitted that driving the MP4/4 on a tight, bumpy street circuit while nursing a sprained wrist was hard. Prost on the other hand had spent his time between Suzuka and Adelaide playing golf at a resort in the Australian state of Queensland. There was also speculation that Honda would run their V10 engines (intended for 1989) in Adelaide instead of the V6 turbo. However, team boss Ron Dennis explained that racing the V10 was never part of the 1988 plan, and that with the RA168-E proving so dominant, Honda wanted to finish the turbo era on the highest possible note.

Third on the grid on both days was Nigel Mansell in his atmospheric Williams-Judd, though he was 1.7 seconds slower than Senna. Mansell was ahead of 1987 pole winner Gerhard Berger in his turbocharged Ferrari. Fifth was Nelson Piquet, finally finding some balance in his Lotus on the only street circuit he liked, despite a couple of spins in qualifying. Mansell's teammate Riccardo Patrese lined up sixth.

Gabriele Tarquini (Coloni), Julian Bailey (Tyrrell), Pierre-Henri Raphanel (Larrousse-Lola making his first appearance in F1 in place of Yannick Dalmas who had contracted Legionnaires' disease) and Bernd Schneider (Zakspeed) all failed to qualify. The Osella of Nicola Larini with its ancient "Osella V8" turbocharged engine (which started life as the Alfa Romeo 890T in 1983 and was actually the most powerful car in the 1988 field with approximately 700 bhp (522 kW; 710 PS)) failed to pre-qualify.

For the most part in 1988, qualifying and race times had generally been faster than those set in 1987, showing the advances in development despite the leading turbo powered cars having approximately 300 bhp (224 kW; 304 PS) less than they had the previous year. In Adelaide the drop in power meant a big difference to the top speeds on the 900-metre-long Brabham Straight and times were slower as a result. In 1987 the faster cars were topping 320 km/h (199 mph) on the straight, while in 1988 those speeds were down to 300 km/h (186 mph) or less. Senna's 1988 pole time was 0.481 slower than Berger's time in 1987 while Berger himself, driving an updated version of his 1987 Ferrari, was 2.25 seconds slower than his 1987 pole time of 1:17.267.

== Race ==
Prost led off the start from Senna, Berger, Piquet, and Mansell in his last race for Williams before joining Ferrari in 1989. By lap 4, Prost's lead over Senna was 5.5 seconds, with Berger close behind the Brazilian. Michele Alboreto's last race for Ferrari ended in retirement shortly after the start, when he collided with Alex Caffi's Dallara.

Berger passed Senna on lap 5 at the Racetrack Hairpin, a tight second-gear right hander at the end of the Brabham Straight, and began a determined drive, catching and passing Prost at the same place on lap 14. He had a three-second lead when he came up to lap Stefano Modena in the EuroBrun and René Arnoux in the Ligier on lap 23. Arnoux appeared to ignore his mirrors and the blue flags instructing him to let Berger past, causing the Ferrari's left front wheel to ride the Ligier's rear right wheel and send both cars into a spin. Berger retired immediately with suspension damage, putting Prost back into the lead with Senna second.

Behind the McLarens, Piquet was maintaining third ahead of the Williams pair of Patrese and Mansell. The Italian opened a small gap on his teammate and closed on Piquet, making several attempts to pass the Brazilian. However, he spun on lap 53, letting Mansell past. The Englishman was no more successful in trying to pass Piquet, and he retired on lap 66 when his brakes failed and he spun into the wall. By lap 59 Prost was putting in a succession of fast laps, extending his lead to over 30 seconds and lapping the whole field up to the fifth-placed Rial of Andrea de Cesaris.

On lap 46, Pierluigi Martini spun his Minardi at the chicane and was almost collected by Stefan Johansson's Ligier. Maurício Gugelmin slowed his March to avoid the pair, only to be hit from behind by Satoru Nakajima's Lotus, putting both cars out. This crash also had an effect on Prost who was the first car upon the scene. The McLaren ran over some debris which broke off part of the front wing end plate, causing the car to understeer for the rest of the race, though Prost was able to play with his car's onboard settings to compensate and would set the fastest race lap later in the race.

Alessandro Nannini spun his Benetton; Jonathan Palmer's Tyrrell suffered transmission problems; and Arrows drivers Derek Warwick and Eddie Cheever both suffered engine failures. Driveshaft trouble accounted for the EuroBruns of Modena and Oscar Larrauri, while Caffi succumbed to clutch failure in his Dallara.

At the finish, only eleven cars were classified, of which just seven saw the chequered flag: de Cesaris, Johansson and Philippe Alliot's Larrousse-Lola all ran out of fuel in the closing laps, while Philippe Streiff's AGS suffered an electrical failure. Prost led home Senna in yet another McLaren 1–2, with Piquet third and Patrese fourth. De Cesaris' misfortune handed fifth place to Thierry Boutsen in the Benetton despite a spin and a stuttering engine, with Ivan Capelli taking the final point for sixth in his March despite a puncture.

In the last race in which cars with turbocharged engines were allowed to compete until 2014, all three podium positions were taken by cars powered by Honda turbos.

== Classification ==
=== Pre-qualifying ===
Pos	No	Driver	Constructor	Time	Gap
1	36	(Italy) Alex Caffi	Dallara-Ford	1:21.519	—
2	33	(Italy) Stefano Modena	EuroBrun-Ford	1:21.901	+0.382
3	31	(Italy) Gabriele Tarquini	Coloni-Ford	1:22.022	+0.503
4	32	(Argentina) Oscar Larrauri	EuroBrun-Ford	1:24.634	+3.115
DNPQ	21	(Italy) Nicola Larini	Osella	1:28.440	+6.921

=== Qualifying ===
Pos	No	Driver	Constructor	Q1	Q2	Gap
1	12	(Brazil) Ayrton Senna	McLaren-Honda	1:18.332	1:17.748	
2	11	(France) Alain Prost	McLaren-Honda	1:18.179	1:17.880	+0.132
3	5	(United Kingdom) Nigel Mansell	Williams-Judd	1:19.427	1:19.508	+1.760
4	28	(Austria) Gerhard Berger	Ferrari	1:20.019	1:19.517	+1.769
5	1	(Brazil) Nelson Piquet	Lotus-Honda	1:20.477	1:19.535	+1.787
6	6	(Italy) Riccardo Patrese	Williams-Judd	1:19.925	1:19.998	+2.177
7	17	(United Kingdom) Derek Warwick	Arrows-Megatron	1:20.086	1:20.495	+2.338
8	19	(Italy) Alessandro Nannini	Benetton-Ford	1:20.331	1:20.182	+2.434
9	16	(Italy) Ivan Capelli	March-Judd	1:21.136	1:20.459	+2.711
10	20	(Belgium) Thierry Boutsen	Benetton-Ford	1:21.114	1:20.486	+2.738
11	36	(Italy) Alex Caffi	Dallara-Ford	1:20.781	1:20.881	+3.033
12	27	(Italy) Michele Alboreto	Ferrari	1:20.844	1:20.964	+3.096
13	2	(Japan) Satoru Nakajima	Lotus-Honda	1:21.542	1:20.852	+3.104
14	23	(Italy) Pierluigi Martini	Minardi-Ford	1:21.905	1:21.133	+3.385
15	22	(Italy) Andrea de Cesaris	Rial-Ford	1:21.944	1:21.164	+3.416
16	14	(France) Philippe Streiff	AGS-Ford	1:22.170	1:21.262	+3.514
17	3	(United Kingdom) Jonathan Palmer	Tyrrell-Ford	1:21.959	1:21.307	+3.559
18	18	(United States) Eddie Cheever	Arrows-Megatron	1:21.393	1:21.514	+3.645
19	15	(Brazil) Maurício Gugelmin	March-Judd	1:21.871	1:21.554	+3.806
20	33	(Italy) Stefano Modena	EuroBrun-Ford	1:21.972	1:21.856	+4.108
21	24	(Spain) Luis Pérez-Sala	Minardi-Ford	1:23.022	1:21.893	+4.145
22	26	(Sweden) Stefan Johansson	Ligier-Judd	1:23.417	1:21.988	+4.240
23	25	(France) René Arnoux	Ligier-Judd	1:23.547	1:22.028	+4.280
24	30	(France) Philippe Alliot	Lola-Ford	1:22.420	1:22.211	+4.463
25	32	(Argentina) Oscar Larrauri	EuroBrun-Ford	1:23.413	1:22.213	+4.465
26	9	(Italy) Piercarlo Ghinzani	Zakspeed	1:22.348	1:22.271	+4.523
27	31	(Italy) Gabriele Tarquini	Coloni-Ford	1:23.650	1:22.393	+4.645
28	4	(United Kingdom) Julian Bailey	Tyrrell-Ford	1:23.530	1:22.529	+4.781
29	29	(France) Pierre-Henri Raphanel	Lola-Ford	1:23.393	1:22.733	+4.985
30	10	(West Germany) Bernd Schneider	Zakspeed	1:24.221	1:23.025	+5.277

=== Race ===
Pos.	No.	Driver	Constructor	Laps	Time/Retired	Grid	Points
1	11	(France) Alain Prost	McLaren-Honda	82	1:53:14.676	2	9
2	12	(Brazil) Ayrton Senna	McLaren-Honda	82	+36.387	1	6
3	1	(Brazil) Nelson Piquet	Lotus-Honda	82	+47.546	5	4
4	6	(Italy) Riccardo Patrese	Williams-Judd	82	+1:20.088	6	3
5	20	(Belgium) Thierry Boutsen	Benetton-Ford	81	+1 lap	10	2
6	16	(Italy) Ivan Capelli	March-Judd	81	+1 lap	9	1
7	23	(Italy) Pierluigi Martini	Minardi-Ford	80	+2 laps	14	
8	22	(Italy) Andrea de Cesaris	Rial-Ford	77	Out of fuel	15	
9	26	(Sweden) Stefan Johansson	Ligier-Judd	76	Out of fuel	22	
10	30	(France) Philippe Alliot	Lola-Ford	75	Out of fuel	24	
11	14	(France) Philippe Streiff	AGS-Ford	73	Electrical	16	
Ret	9	(Italy) Piercarlo Ghinzani	Zakspeed	69	Fuel system	26	
Ret	5	(United Kingdom) Nigel Mansell	Williams-Judd	65	Brake failure	3	
Ret	19	(Italy) Alessandro Nannini	Benetton-Ford	63	Spun off	8	
Ret	33	(Italy) Stefano Modena	EuroBrun-Ford	63	Halfshaft	20	
Ret	17	(United Kingdom) Derek Warwick	Arrows-Megatron	52	Engine	7	
Ret	18	(United States) Eddie Cheever	Arrows-Megatron	51	Engine	18	
Ret	15	(Brazil) Maurício Gugelmin	March-Judd	46	Collision	19	
Ret	2	(Japan) Satoru Nakajima	Lotus-Honda	45	Collision	13	
Ret	24	(Spain) Luis Pérez-Sala	Minardi-Ford	41	Engine	21	
Ret	36	(Italy) Alex Caffi	Dallara-Ford	32	Clutch	11	
Ret	28	(Austria) Gerhard Berger	Ferrari	25	Collision	4	
Ret	25	(France) René Arnoux	Ligier-Judd	24	Collision	23	
Ret	3	(United Kingdom) Jonathan Palmer	Tyrrell-Ford	16	Transmission	17	
Ret	32	(Argentina) Oscar Larrauri	EuroBrun-Ford	12	Halfshaft	25	
Ret	27	(Italy) Michele Alboreto	Ferrari	0	Collision	12	
DNQ	31	(Italy) Gabriele Tarquini	Coloni-Ford				
DNQ	4	(United Kingdom) Julian Bailey	Tyrrell-Ford				
DNQ	29	(France) Pierre-Henri Raphanel	Lola-Ford				
DNQ	10	(West Germany) Bernd Schneider	Zakspeed				
DNPQ	21	(Italy) Nicola Larini	Osella				
Fastest lap: (France) Alain Prost (McLaren-Honda) – 1:21.216 (lap 59)

== Championship standings after the race ==
- **Bold text** indicates World Champions.

Drivers' Championship standings

Pos	Driver	Points
1	(Brazil) **Ayrton Senna**	90 (94)
2	(France) Alain Prost	87 (105)
3	(Austria) Gerhard Berger	41
4	(Belgium) Thierry Boutsen	31
5	(Italy) Michele Alboreto	24

Constructors' Championship standings

Pos	Constructor	Points
1	(United Kingdom) **McLaren-Honda**	199
2	(Italy) Ferrari	65
3	(United Kingdom) Benetton-Ford	46
4	(United Kingdom) Lotus-Honda	21
5	(United Kingdom) Williams-Judd	20

- Note: Only the top five positions are included for both sets of standings. Drivers could only count their best 11 results; numbers without parentheses are points counting towards the Drivers' Championship, while numbers in parentheses are total points scored. Points accurate at final declaration of results. The Benettons were subsequently disqualified from the Belgian Grand Prix and their points reallocated.

Previous race: 1988 Japanese Grand Prix	FIA Formula One World Championship; 1988 season	Next race: 1989 Brazilian Grand Prix
Previous race: 1987 Australian Grand Prix	Australian Grand Prix	Next race: 1989 Australian Grand Prix
