= 1988 German Grand Prix =

- Race 9 of 16 in the 1988 Formula One World Championship

Race details
- Date: 24 July 1988
- Official name: Mobil 1 Grosser Preis von Deutschland
- Location: Hockenheimring, Hockenheim, West Germany
- Course: Permanent racing facility
- Course length: 6.802 km (4.227 miles)
- Distance: 44 laps, 299.068 km (185.832 miles)
- Weather: Wet and cool

Pole position
Driver	(Brazil) Ayrton Senna	McLaren-Honda
- Time: 1:44.596

Fastest lap
Driver	(Italy) Alessandro Nannini	Benetton-Ford
- Time: 2:03.032 on lap 40

Podium
First	(Brazil) Ayrton Senna	McLaren-Honda
Second	(France) Alain Prost	McLaren-Honda
Third	(Austria) Gerhard Berger	Ferrari

The 1988 German Grand Prix was a Formula One motor race held on 24 July 1988 at the Hockenheimring, Hockenheim. It was the ninth race of the 1988 Formula One World Championship.

The 44-lap race was won from pole position by Ayrton Senna, driving a McLaren-Honda, with teammate Alain Prost second and Gerhard Berger third in a Ferrari. The win, Senna's fifth of the season, moved him to within three points of Prost at the top of the Drivers' Championship.

== Report ==
=== Pre-race ===
At the midpoint of the season, the pre-qualifiers were re-evaluated. After a fourth-place finish in the Detroit Grand Prix, the Rial of Andrea de Cesaris was promoted to the top 26 cars automatically entered into the main qualifying sessions. Relegated to pre-qualifying was the Osella of Nicola Larini.

Before the German Grand Prix, Williams announced that Thierry Boutsen would be joining the team in 1989 as the replacement for Nigel Mansell, who was moving to Ferrari.

=== Qualifying ===
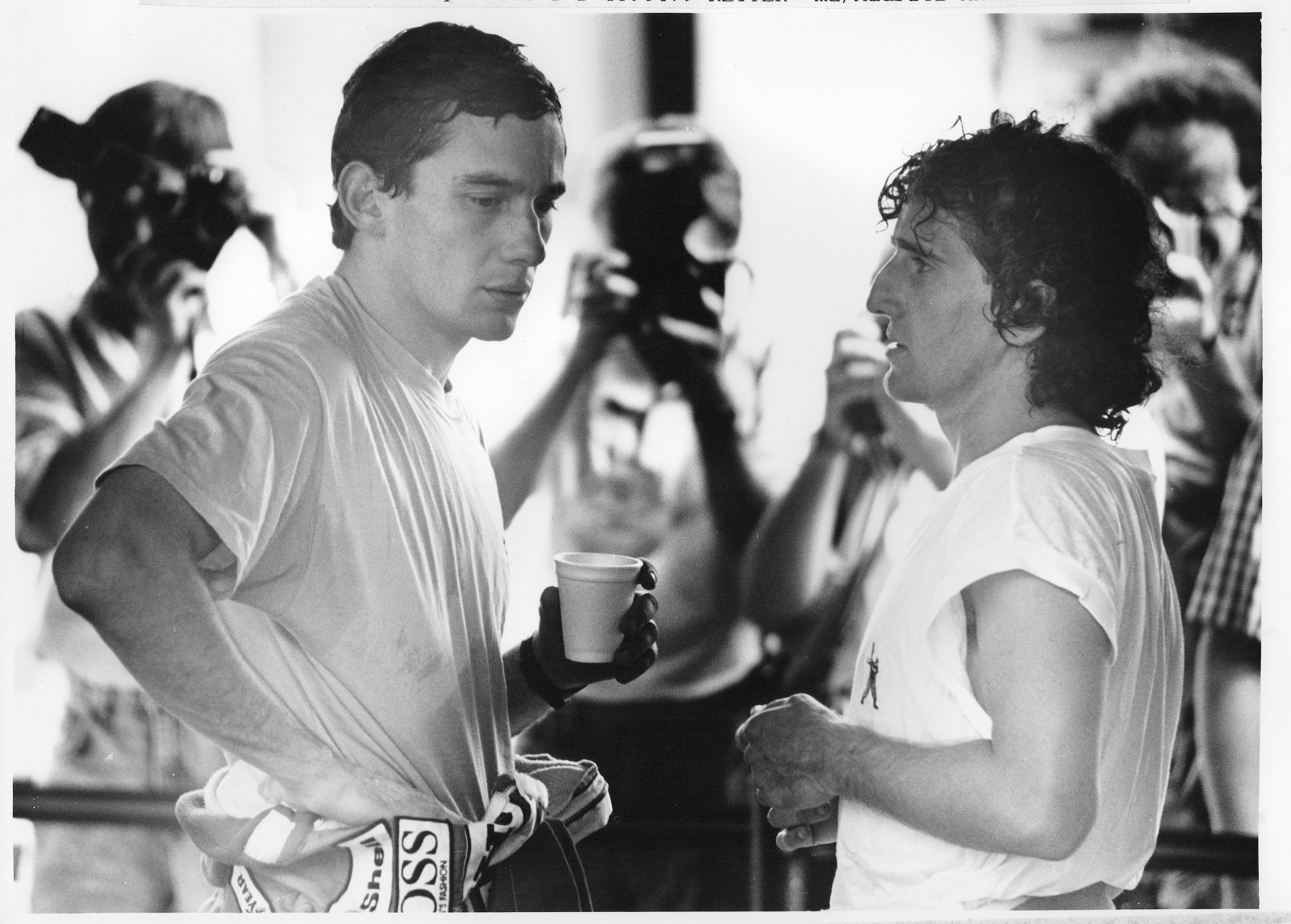
Ayrton Senna of BraziI (left) and Alain Prost of France discuss the details of today's practice of the West German F1 Grand Prix in Hockenheim on July 22, 1988. Senna clocked the fastest time of 1:45.615 followed by Prost's 1:46.047.

Qualifying saw Ayrton Senna take his seventh pole position of the season by just under 0.3 seconds from McLaren teammate Alain Prost. Gerhard Berger was third in his Ferrari, albeit over a second behind Prost, with teammate Michele Alboreto fourth, a further second behind. Nelson Piquet took fifth in his Lotus, with Alessandro Nannini sixth in his Benetton, the highest-placed non-turbo car. The Marches of Ivan Capelli and Maurício Gugelmin took seventh and tenth respectively, sandwiching Satoru Nakajima in the second Lotus and Boutsen in the second Benetton.

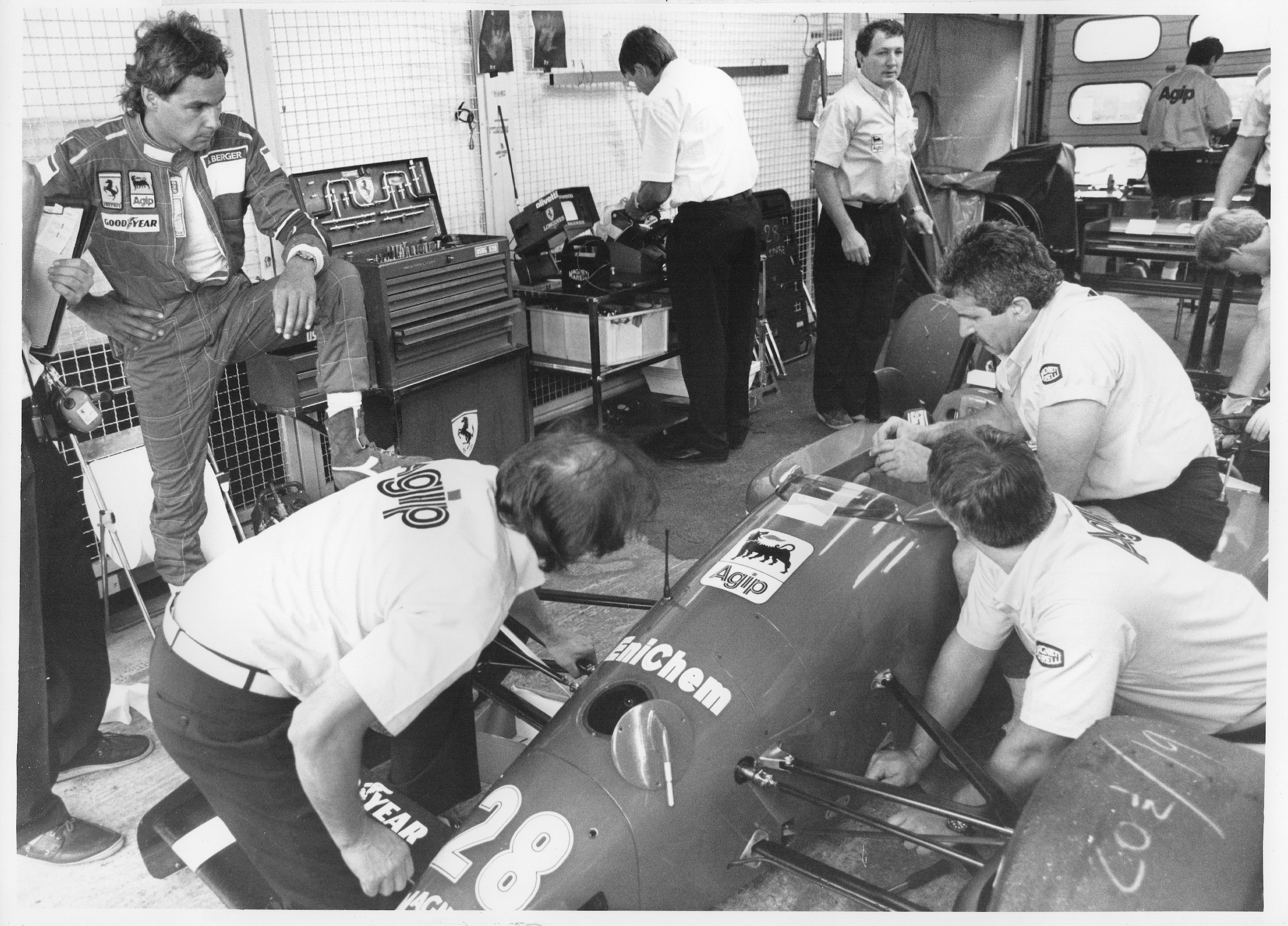
Gerhard Berger (left) of Austria looks on as his pit crew works on his Ferrari during today's practice of the West German Grand Prix in Hockenheim on July 22, 1988. Berger was third with a time of 1:47.839.

Although he had qualified on pole in Britain at the ultra fast Silverstone Circuit (the only non-McLaren pole of the season), Gerhard Berger did not expect to be as fast as the McLarens in qualifying and was proven correct. Although Hockenheim had much longer straights than Silverstone, whereas the British circuit was almost all straights and fast, sweeping turns (with only the Woodcote Chicane to break it up), all of the German circuits turns other than turns 1 and 11 were relatively low speed and needed good acceleration rather than just top end horsepower, and in that the Honda V6 turbo had the advantage over the Ferrari with both Berger and Alboreto complaining virtually all season about the Ferrari's poor throttle response.

=== Race ===
There had been thunderstorms all weekend. The rain stopped on Sunday morning, but there were concerns over which type of tyre to use for the race. In the end, everyone started on wet tyres with the exception of Piquet, who gambled on the track drying out.

At the start, Senna led away while Prost dropped behind Berger and a fast-starting Nannini. Piquet's gamble failed to pay off as he aquaplaned off the track at the Ostkurve chicane and hit the barriers, limping back to the pits to retire (with 1976 World Champion James Hunt calling it "An absolutely stupid decision by Piquet" on the BBC's live broadcast, claiming that a driver of Piquet's stature and experience should have known better knowing what Hockenheim was like in the rain). Prost re-passed Nannini on lap 8, while on lap 9 Philippe Alliot, who had pitted for slick tyres, spun his Lola off at the Ostkurve while allowing Senna to lap him. Prost overtook Berger for second on lap 12, but by then Senna was 12 seconds ahead.

Senna and Prost maintained their 1-2 until the chequered flag, despite a late spin by the Frenchman coming out of the Ostkurve. It was Senna's fifth win of the season, as well as the sixth 1-2 for McLaren; the Brazilian thus moved within three points of Prost in the Drivers' Championship.

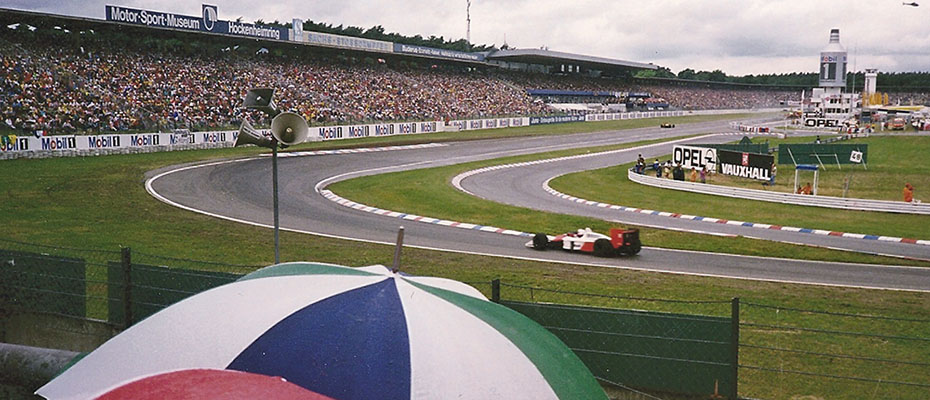
Alain Prost in his McLaren during the race, 24 July 1988

Berger and Alboreto finished third and fourth respectively. Berger's podium finish was to be the last achieved by the Ferrari team during Enzo Ferrari's lifetime, as he died three weeks later. Changes to the Ferrari's engine (suggested earlier in the season by team Technical Director John Barnard) had seen an improvement in the fuel consumption of the Ferrari V6 which had seen both cars run out of fuel in Britain, though it was still a thirstier engine than the Honda. After running in third for the first 7 laps and in fourth since then Nannini was forced to pit seven laps from the end due to a broken throttle bracket, losing four laps as a result; His "Latin blood" boiling at having been robbed of a high placing, the chain smoking Italian charged after leaving the pits which would bring him the fastest lap of the race (and the only non-turbo fastest lap of the season), though he still finished only 18th. Capelli inherited fifth despite having no clutch for the last 30 laps, while Boutsen took the final point for sixth.

Mansell retired from seventh with a spin after a broken bolt had jammed his gearbox. He had tried to retire in the pits the previous lap, but the team could find nothing wrong and sent him back out. Bernd Schneider achieved his first Grand Prix finish in his home race, coming home 12th, which turned out to be the highest finish of the season for the West German Zakspeed team.

== Classification ==
=== Pre-qualifying ===
Pos	No	Driver	Constructor	Time	Gap
1	21	(Italy) Nicola Larini	Osella	1:52.321	—
2	36	(Italy) Alex Caffi	Dallara-Ford	1:53.031	+0.710
3	32	(Argentina) Oscar Larrauri	EuroBrun-Ford	1:54.184	+1.863
4	33	(Italy) Stefano Modena	EuroBrun-Ford	1:54.317	+1.996
DNPQ	31	(Italy) Gabriele Tarquini	Coloni-Ford	1:54.358	+2.037

=== Qualifying ===
Pos	No	Driver	Constructor	Q1	Q2	Gap
1	12	(Brazil) Ayrton Senna	McLaren-Honda	1:44.596	1:50.002	—
2	11	(France) Alain Prost	McLaren-Honda	1:44.873	1:45.868	+0.277
3	28	(Austria) Gerhard Berger	Ferrari	1:46.115	1:46.431	+1.519
4	27	(Italy) Michele Alboreto	Ferrari	1:47.154	1:47.418	+2.558
5	1	(Brazil) Nelson Piquet	Lotus-Honda	1:47.702	1:47.681	+3.085
6	19	(Italy) Alessandro Nannini	Benetton-Ford	1:48.223	1:48.208	+3.612
7	16	(Italy) Ivan Capelli	March-Judd	1:48.703	1:49.750	+4.107
8	2	(Japan) Satoru Nakajima	Lotus-Honda	1:49.359	1:48.781	+4.185
9	20	(Belgium) Thierry Boutsen	Benetton-Ford	1:48.837	1:49.966	+4.241
10	15	(Brazil) Maurício Gugelmin	March-Judd	1:49.511	1:49.645	+4.915
11	5	(United Kingdom) Nigel Mansell	Williams-Judd	1:49.850	1:50.673	+5.254
12	17	(United Kingdom) Derek Warwick	Arrows-Megatron	1:50.459	1:50.770	+5.863
13	6	(Italy) Riccardo Patrese	Williams-Judd	1:51.105	1:50.719	+6.213
14	22	(Italy) Andrea de Cesaris	Rial-Ford	1:51.004	1:51.859	+6.408
15	18	(United States) Eddie Cheever	Arrows-Megatron	1:51.385	1:51.171	+6.575
16	14	(France) Philippe Streiff	AGS-Ford	1:52.348	1:51.642	+7.046
17	25	(France) René Arnoux	Ligier-Judd	1:54.139	1:52.080	+7.484
18	21	(Italy) Nicola Larini	Osella	1:52.203	1:52.168	+7.572
19	36	(Italy) Alex Caffi	Dallara-Ford	1:52.469	1:52.277	+7.681
20	30	(France) Philippe Alliot	Lola-Ford	1:52.293	1:52.629	+7.697
21	29	(France) Yannick Dalmas	Lola-Ford	1:52.795	1:52.436	+7.840
22	10	(West Germany) Bernd Schneider	Zakspeed	1:52.696	1:52.664	+8.068
23	9	(Italy) Piercarlo Ghinzani	Zakspeed	1:52.674	1:57.241	+8.078
24	3	(United Kingdom) Jonathan Palmer	Tyrrell-Ford	1:53.238	1:52.908	+8.312
25	33	(Italy) Stefano Modena	EuroBrun-Ford	1:52.998	1:53.904	+8.402
26	32	(Argentina) Oscar Larrauri	EuroBrun-Ford	1:53.832	1:53.043	+8.447
DNQ	24	(Spain) Luis Pérez-Sala	Minardi-Ford	1:53.356	1:53.673	+8.760
DNQ	26	(Sweden) Stefan Johansson	Ligier-Judd	1:54.717	1:53.507	+8.911
DNQ	4	(United Kingdom) Julian Bailey	Tyrrell-Ford	1:53.674	1:53.576	+8.980
DNQ	23	(Italy) Pierluigi Martini	Minardi-Ford	1:53.720	1:53.673	+9.077

=== Race ===
Pos	No	Driver	Constructor	Laps	Time/Retired	Grid	Points
1	12	(Brazil) Ayrton Senna	McLaren-Honda	44	1:32:54.188	1	9
2	11	(France) Alain Prost	McLaren-Honda	44	+ 13.609	2	6
3	28	(Austria) Gerhard Berger	Ferrari	44	+ 52.095	3	4
4	27	(Italy) Michele Alboreto	Ferrari	44	+ 1:40.912	4	3
5	16	(Italy) Ivan Capelli	March-Judd	44	+ 1:49.606	7	2
6	20	(Belgium) Thierry Boutsen	Benetton-Ford	43	+ 1 Lap	9	1
7	17	(United Kingdom) Derek Warwick	Arrows-Megatron	43	+ 1 Lap	12	
8	15	(Brazil) Maurício Gugelmin	March-Judd	43	+ 1 Lap	10	
9	2	(Japan) Satoru Nakajima	Lotus-Honda	43	+ 1 Lap	8	
10	18	(United States) Eddie Cheever	Arrows-Megatron	43	+ 1 Lap	15	
11	3	(United Kingdom) Jonathan Palmer	Tyrrell-Ford	43	+ 1 Lap	24	
12	10	(West Germany) Bernd Schneider	Zakspeed	43	+ 1 Lap	22	
13	22	(Italy) Andrea de Cesaris	Rial-Ford	42	+ 2 Laps	14	
14	9	(Italy) Piercarlo Ghinzani	Zakspeed	42	+ 2 Laps	23	
15	36	(Italy) Alex Caffi	Dallara-Ford	42	+ 2 Laps	19	
16	32	(Argentina) Oscar Larrauri	EuroBrun-Ford	42	+ 2 Laps	26	
17	25	(France) René Arnoux	Ligier-Judd	41	+ 3 Laps	17	
18	19	(Italy) Alessandro Nannini	Benetton-Ford	40	+ 4 Laps	6	
19	29	(France) Yannick Dalmas	Lola-Ford	39	Clutch	21	
Ret	14	(France) Philippe Streiff	AGS-Ford	38	Throttle	16	
Ret	6	(Italy) Riccardo Patrese	Williams-Judd	34	Spun Off	13	
Ret	21	(Italy) Nicola Larini	Osella	27	Engine	18	
Ret	5	(United Kingdom) Nigel Mansell	Williams-Judd	16	Spun Off	11	
Ret	33	(Italy) Stefano Modena	EuroBrun-Ford	15	Engine	25	
Ret	30	(France) Philippe Alliot	Lola-Ford	8	Spun Off	20	
Ret	1	(Brazil) Nelson Piquet	Lotus-Honda	1	Spun Off	5	
DNQ	24	(Spain) Luis Pérez-Sala	Minardi-Ford				
DNQ	26	(Sweden) Stefan Johansson	Ligier-Judd				
DNQ	4	(United Kingdom) Julian Bailey	Tyrrell-Ford				
DNQ	23	(Italy) Pierluigi Martini	Minardi-Ford				
DNPQ	31	(Italy) Gabriele Tarquini	Coloni-Ford				

== Championship standings after the race ==
Drivers' Championship standings

Pos	Driver	Points
1	(France) Alain Prost	60
2	(Brazil) Ayrton Senna	57
3	(Austria) Gerhard Berger	25
4	(Italy) Michele Alboreto	16
5	(Brazil) Nelson Piquet	15

Constructors' Championship standings

Pos	Constructor	Points
1	(United Kingdom) McLaren-Honda	117
2	(Italy) Ferrari	41
3	(United Kingdom) Benetton-Ford	18
4	(United Kingdom) Lotus-Honda	16
5	(United Kingdom) Arrows-Megatron	10

- Note: Only the top five positions are included for both sets of standings.

Previous race: 1988 British Grand Prix	FIA Formula One World Championship; 1988 season	Next race: 1988 Hungarian Grand Prix
Previous race: 1987 German Grand Prix	German Grand Prix	Next race: 1989 German Grand Prix
