= 1988 French Grand Prix =

Formula One motor race

- Race 7 of 16 in the 1988 Formula One World Championship
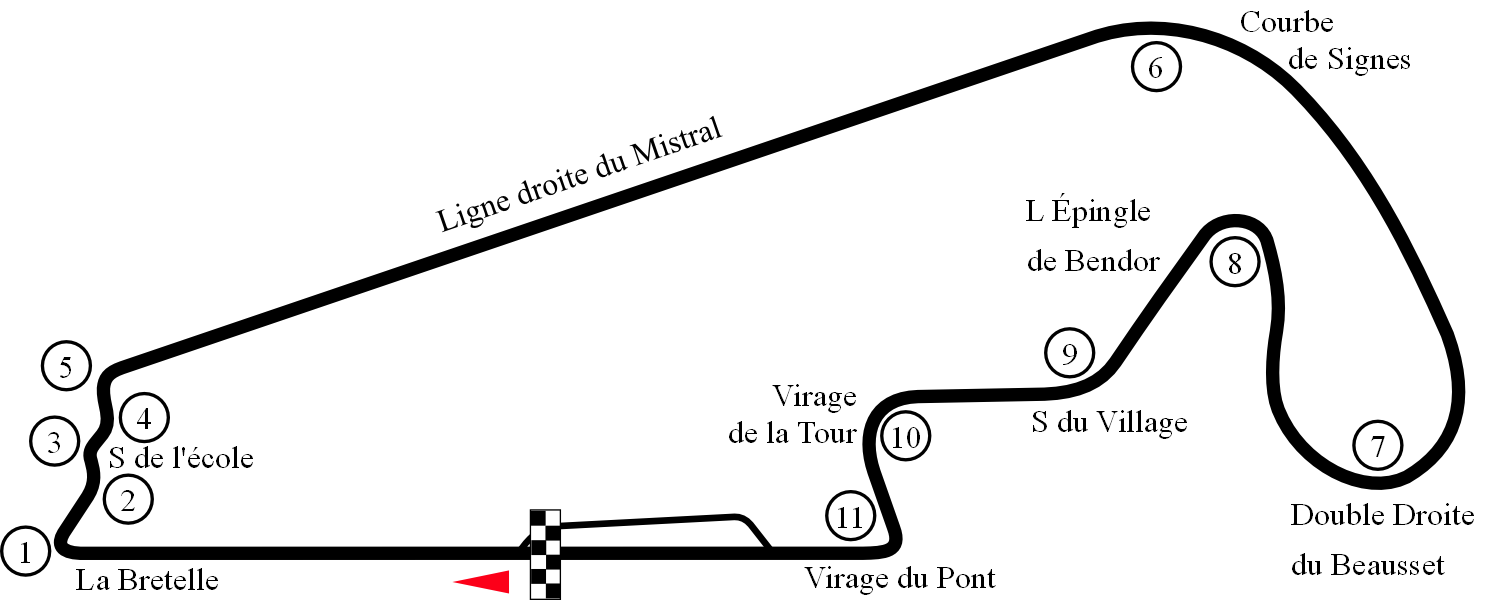

Race details
- Date: 3 July 1988
- Official name: Rhône-Poulenc Grand Prix de France
- Location: Circuit Paul Ricard, Le Castellet, France
- Course: Permanent racing facility
- Course length: 3.813 km (2.369 miles)
- Distance: 80 laps, 305.040 km (189.543 miles)
- Weather: Sunny and hot

Pole position
Driver	(France) Alain Prost	McLaren-Honda
- Time: 1:07.589

Fastest lap
Driver	(France) Alain Prost	McLaren-Honda
- Time: 1:11.737 on lap 45

Podium
First	(France) Alain Prost	McLaren-Honda
Second	(Brazil) Ayrton Senna	McLaren-Honda
Third	(Italy) Michele Alboreto	Ferrari

The 1988 French Grand Prix was a Formula One motor race held on 3 July 1988 at the Circuit Paul Ricard, Le Castellet. It was the seventh race of the 1988 Formula One World Championship.

The 80-lap race was won by local driver Alain Prost, driving a McLaren-Honda, after he started from pole position. Prost's Brazilian teammate Ayrton Senna finished second, with Italian Michele Alboreto third in a Ferrari.

== Qualifying ==
The two McLarens lined up in their usual front row places, but, for the first time this season, Alain Prost was ahead of Ayrton Senna, the Frenchman beating the Brazilian by almost half a second to take his first pole since the 1986 Monaco Grand Prix and in doing so stopping his teammate from a record-breaking 7th pole in succession. The two Ferraris filled the second row, Gerhard Berger beating Michele Alboreto by over 1.1 seconds, though neither driver believed they could race with the McLarens simply because of fuel consumption. On the third row were the two normally-aspirated Benettons of Thierry Boutsen and Alessandro Nannini, while the Lotuses of Nelson Piquet and Satoru Nakajima filled the fourth row, Piquet being the last driver to qualify under 1:10. The top ten was completed by the Williams of Nigel Mansell (over 2.7 seconds slower than Prost and almost 4 seconds slower than his 1987 pole time) and the March of Ivan Capelli, who had recovered after fracturing his left foot in a crash during practice in Detroit two weeks before.

Meanwhile, Ligier had a disastrous weekend on their home turf with both René Arnoux, a winner with Renault at the circuit in 1982, and Stefan Johansson failing to qualify, though they did have a celebration of sorts over the weekend as Arnoux turned 40 the day after the race. Julian Bailey also failed to qualify in his Tyrrell, while Piercarlo Ghinzani qualified 22nd in his Zakspeed but was excluded for missing a weight check, thus promoting Oscar Larrauri's EuroBrun to the last grid spot.

== Race summary ==
Prost led away from Senna and the two Ferraris, with Piquet passing the two Benettons for fifth. Despite worries in the McLaren pit about overly high fuel consumption (the fuel readouts in the cars were showing less fuel used than what the Honda telemetry was telling the team), Ron Dennis was reportedly prepared to let his drivers run out of fuel at the expense of a perfect season if it taught them to be more conservative given their obvious advantage over the field, though ultimately the onboard readouts were proved correct. Prost maintained a two-second advantage over Senna until the mid-race pit stops, while an early stop by Berger on lap 22 allowed teammate Alboreto through into third. While both McLarens were racing each other out front, they were still pulling away from the field at sometimes a second per lap.

Senna made his pit stop three laps before Prost, enabling him to take the lead thanks to a slow stop for Prost with a sticking front wheel, but traffic on the Mistral Straight (including a less than helpful Piquet who most likely enjoyed seeing Senna lose the lead to Prost at close quarters) and a gearbox problem allowed Prost to close right up to him and then overtake him on lap 61 as they lapped Alex Caffi and Pierluigi Martini at the Signes corner. Meanwhile, Berger reclaimed third only for Alboreto to pass him again during the pit stops, while Mansell suffered his seventh consecutive retirement, dropping out on lap 49 with suspension problems, though he had been dropping back for a number of laps with power loss from his Judd V8 engine. After returning to the pits and getting himself cleaned up, the Englishman left the circuit profoundly fed up with the performance of the Williams, fuelling ongoing speculation in the press that he would leave the team at the end of the year to join Ferrari after the Italian team had announced they would not be keeping Alboreto for 1989. Despite the rumours turning out to be correct, Mansell continued to deny he was joining Ferrari.

In the closing laps, Prost pulled away as Senna's gearbox troubles continued, losing several gears. The Brazilian eventually finished nearly 32 seconds behind the Frenchman, though he was still nearly 35 seconds ahead of Alboreto, the last man on the lead lap. Berger was fourth ahead of Piquet, who also suffered gearbox problems in the later stages of the race; the final point went to the Benetton of Nannini. France was the first time since the 1987 Monaco Grand Prix that Alboreto had finished in front of his teammate in a race where they both finished. During the race Alboreto had the advantage of an almost perfectly balanced car, while Berger complained of severe understeer, something not needed at the high speed Signes corner at the end of the Mistral.

The fastest lap of the race, a 1:11.737 set by Prost on lap 45, was over two seconds slower than the 1:09.548 set by Piquet in a Honda-powered Williams the previous year – a consequence of the restrictions imposed on turbocharged engines this season with the major difference being the speeds attained on the now 1 km long Mistral Straight. In 1987 the fastest turbo cars (Honda powered) were timed at 325 km/h (202 mph) on the straight. In 1988 the top speed was recorded at 311 km/h (193 mph).

For Prost it was his third win in his home Grand Prix after winning in both 1981 at Dijon (his first Grand Prix victory) and 1983 at the full length Paul Ricard. On both occasions he had been driving for the factory Renault team.

== Classification ==
=== Pre-qualifying ===
Pos	No	Driver	Constructor	Time	Gap
1	33	(Italy) Stefano Modena	EuroBrun-Ford	1:12.805	
2	36	(Italy) Alex Caffi	Dallara-Ford	1:12.891	+0.086
3	22	(Italy) Andrea de Cesaris	Rial-Ford	1:12.898	+0.093
4	32	(Argentina) Oscar Larrauri	EuroBrun-Ford	1:13.452	+0.647
DNPQ	31	(Italy) Gabriele Tarquini	Coloni-Ford	1:14.214	+1.409

=== Qualifying ===
Pos	No	Driver	Constructor	Q1	Q2	Gap
1	11	(France) Alain Prost	McLaren-Honda	1:08.171	1:07.589	—
2	12	(Brazil) Ayrton Senna	McLaren-Honda	1:08.456	1:08.067	+0.478
3	28	(Austria) Gerhard Berger	Ferrari	1:09.032	1:08.282	+0.693
4	27	(Italy) Michele Alboreto	Ferrari	1:09.624	1:09.422	+1.833
5	20	(Belgium) Thierry Boutsen	Benetton-Ford	1:11.170	1:09.587	+1.998
6	19	(Italy) Alessandro Nannini	Benetton-Ford	1:10.743	1:09.718	+2.129
7	1	(Brazil) Nelson Piquet	Lotus-Honda	1:09.734	1:09.900	+2.145
8	2	(Japan) Satoru Nakajima	Lotus-Honda	1:11.394	1:10.250	+2.661
9	5	(United Kingdom) Nigel Mansell	Williams-Judd	1:11.112	1:10.337	+2.748
10	16	(Italy) Ivan Capelli	March-Judd	1:11.779	1:10.496	+2.907
11	17	(United Kingdom) Derek Warwick	Arrows-Megatron	1:11.339	1:10.634	+3.045
12	22	(Italy) Andrea de Cesaris	Rial-Ford	1:11.854	1:10.861	+3.272
13	18	(United States) Eddie Cheever	Arrows-Megatron	1:11.567	1:10.979	+3.390
14	36	(Italy) Alex Caffi	Dallara-Ford	1:13.144	1:11.211	+3.622
15	6	(Italy) Riccardo Patrese	Williams-Judd	1:11.671	1:11.286	+3.697
16	15	(Brazil) Maurício Gugelmin	March-Judd	1:11.315	1:11.404	+3.726
17	14	(France) Philippe Streiff	AGS-Ford	1:12.004	1:11.466	+3.877
18	30	(France) Philippe Alliot	Lola-Ford	1:12.286	1:11.511	+3.922
19	29	(France) Yannick Dalmas	Lola-Ford	1:12.547	1:11.747	+4.158
20	33	(Italy) Stefano Modena	EuroBrun-Ford	1:12.997	1:12.007	+4.418
21	10	(West Germany) Bernd Schneider	Zakspeed	1:13.527	1:12.026	+4.437
22	23	(Italy) Pierluigi Martini	Minardi-Ford	1:13.039	1:12.268	+4.679
23	3	(United Kingdom) Jonathan Palmer	Tyrrell-Ford	1:13.063	1:12.316	+4.727
24	21	(Italy) Nicola Larini	Osella	1:13.037	1:12.406	+4.817
25	24	(Spain) Luis Pérez-Sala	Minardi-Ford	1:12.938	1:12.525	+4.936
26	32	(Argentina) Oscar Larrauri	EuroBrun-Ford	1:13.888	1:12.538	+4.949
DNQ	25	(France) René Arnoux	Ligier-Judd	1:12.654	1:12.736	+5.065
DNQ	4	(United Kingdom) Julian Bailey	Tyrrell-Ford	1:13.839	1:12.697	+5.108
DNQ	26	(Sweden) Stefan Johansson	Ligier-Judd	1:13.629	1:12.801	+5.212
EX	9	(Italy) Piercarlo Ghinzani	Zakspeed	1:14.797	1:12.121	

=== Race ===
Pos	No	Driver	Constructor	Laps	Time/Retired	Grid	Points
1	11	(France) Alain Prost	McLaren-Honda	80	1:37:37.328	1	9
2	12	(Brazil) Ayrton Senna	McLaren-Honda	80	+ 31.752	2	6
3	27	(Italy) Michele Alboreto	Ferrari	80	+ 1:06.505	4	4
4	28	(Austria) Gerhard Berger	Ferrari	79	+ 1 lap	3	3
5	1	(Brazil) Nelson Piquet	Lotus-Honda	79	+ 1 lap	7	2
6	19	(Italy) Alessandro Nannini	Benetton-Ford	79	+ 1 lap	6	1
7	2	(Japan) Satoru Nakajima	Lotus-Honda	79	+ 1 lap	8	
8	15	(Brazil) Maurício Gugelmin	March-Judd	79	+ 1 lap	16	
9	16	(Italy) Ivan Capelli	March-Judd	79	+ 1 lap	10	
10	22	(Italy) Andrea de Cesaris	Rial-Ford	78	+ 2 laps	12	
11	18	(United States) Eddie Cheever	Arrows-Megatron	78	+ 2 laps	13	
12	36	(Italy) Alex Caffi	Dallara-Ford	78	+ 2 laps	14	
13	29	(France) Yannick Dalmas	Lola-Ford	78	+ 2 laps	19	
14	33	(Italy) Stefano Modena	EuroBrun-Ford	77	+ 3 laps	20	
15	23	(Italy) Pierluigi Martini	Minardi-Ford	77	+ 3 laps	22	
NC	24	(Spain) Luis Pérez-Sala	Minardi-Ford	70	+ 10 laps	25	
Ret	32	(Argentina) Oscar Larrauri	EuroBrun-Ford	64	Clutch	26	
Ret	21	(Italy) Nicola Larini	Osella	56	Halfshaft	24	
Ret	10	(West Germany) Bernd Schneider	Zakspeed	55	Gearbox	21	
Ret	5	(United Kingdom) Nigel Mansell	Williams-Judd	48	Suspension	9	
Ret	30	(France) Philippe Alliot	Lola-Ford	46	Electrical	18	
Ret	3	(United Kingdom) Jonathan Palmer	Tyrrell-Ford	40	Engine	23	
Ret	6	(Italy) Riccardo Patrese	Williams-Judd	35	Brakes	15	
Ret	20	(Belgium) Thierry Boutsen	Benetton-Ford	28	Engine	5	
Ret	14	(France) Philippe Streiff	AGS-Ford	20	Fuel leak	17	
Ret	17	(United Kingdom) Derek Warwick	Arrows-Megatron	11	Spun off	11	
DNQ	25	(France) René Arnoux	Ligier-Judd				
DNQ	4	(United Kingdom) Julian Bailey	Tyrrell-Ford				
DNQ	26	(Sweden) Stefan Johansson	Ligier-Judd				
DNPQ	31	(Italy) Gabriele Tarquini	Coloni-Ford				
EX	9	(Italy) Piercarlo Ghinzani	Zakspeed		Excluded		

== Championship standings after the race ==
Drivers' Championship standings

Pos	Driver	Points
1	(France) Alain Prost	54
2	(Brazil) Ayrton Senna	39
3	(Austria) Gerhard Berger	21
4	(Italy) Michele Alboreto	13
5	(Brazil) Nelson Piquet	13

Constructors' Championship standings

Pos	Constructor	Points
1	(United Kingdom) McLaren-Honda	93
2	(Italy) Ferrari	34
3	(United Kingdom) Lotus-Honda	14
4	(United Kingdom) Benetton-Ford	13
5	(United Kingdom) Arrows-Megatron	9

- Note: Only the top five positions are included for both sets of standings.

Previous race: 1988 Detroit Grand Prix	FIA Formula One World Championship; 1988 season	Next race: 1988 British Grand Prix
Previous race: 1987 French Grand Prix	French Grand Prix	Next race: 1989 French Grand Prix
