= 1988 Canadian Grand Prix =

- Race 5 of 16 in the 1988 Formula One World Championship

Race details
- Date: 12 June 1988
- Official name: XXVI Molson Grand Prix du Canada
- Location: Circuit Gilles Villeneuve, Montreal, Quebec, Canada
- Course: Temporary street circuit
- Course length: 4.390 km (2.728 miles)
- Distance: 69 laps, 302.910 km (188.220 miles)
- Weather: Sunny and hot with temperatures up to 29 °C (84 °F); wind speeds up to 19 kilometres per hour (12 mph)

Pole position
Driver	(Brazil) Ayrton Senna	McLaren-Honda
- Time: 1:21.681

Fastest lap
Driver	(Brazil) Ayrton Senna	McLaren-Honda
- Time: 1:24.973 on lap 53

Podium
First	(Brazil) Ayrton Senna	McLaren-Honda
Second	(France) Alain Prost	McLaren-Honda
Third	(Belgium) Thierry Boutsen	Benetton-Ford

The 1988 Canadian Grand Prix was a Formula One motor race held on 12 June 1988 at the Circuit Gilles Villeneuve, Montreal. It was the fifth race of the 1988 Formula One World Championship. The 69-lap race was won from pole position by Brazilian driver Ayrton Senna, driving a McLaren-Honda, with French teammate Alain Prost second and Belgian Thierry Boutsen third in a Benetton-Ford.

== Report ==
=== Qualifying ===
The Canadian Grand Prix returned to the Formula One calendar after a year's absence. In the meantime, major changes had been made to the Circuit Gilles Villeneuve: the start-finish line, pit lane and facilities had been moved from the top end of the track to the bottom end, necessitating the removal of two turns, while other turns had been re-profiled slightly. While the new permanent pit facilities and wide pit lane got the thumbs up from the teams and drivers, the one downside was that the new entry lane to the pits was directly off the braking area for turn 16 into the chicane before the new pit straight. The concern being that as the cars had to remain on the racing line to enter the pits, a closely following driver not knowing a car in front was headed to pit lane, could have easily run into the back of them at considerable speed as it was also the fastest part of the circuit. Although thankfully this never eventuated, it did cause concern.

The McLarens once again dominated qualifying, with Ayrton Senna taking his fifth consecutive pole position by just under 0.2 seconds from Alain Prost. The Ferraris of Gerhard Berger and Michele Alboreto, benefitting from a revised plenum chamber on the V6 turbo which put the Italian engine back on par with Honda in the power stakes, filled the second row, while the Benetton of Alessandro Nannini was the fastest of the naturally-aspirated cars in fifth, just under 2.3 seconds behind Senna. Nelson Piquet was sixth in his Lotus, followed by Thierry Boutsen in the second Benetton, Eddie Cheever in the Arrows and Nigel Mansell in the Williams, while Philippe Streiff put in a strong performance to take tenth, which would turn out to be the best-ever grid position for the AGS team. Also achieving its best-ever grid placing was EuroBrun, as Stefano Modena took 15th.

The Saturday session saw Derek Warwick suffer a big accident in his Arrows. Turning into the chicane into the new start-finish straight, Warwick slid on dirt kicked up moments before by Streiff's AGS. The Arrows spun onto the inside kerb and became airborne, then bounced several times before hitting what is now known as the "Wall of Champions" at unabated speed. Warwick was briefly knocked unconscious, winded from the impact and had hurt his back; he received aid from fellow Briton Mansell, who had suffered a similar crash at Suzuka the previous year (at the time of the crash, which happened directly opposite the Williams pit, Mansell had been on the pit wall talking to Patrick Head and once the red flag was shown he immediately jumped the pit wall and was the first to help his fellow Englishman). However, Warwick was declared fit to race and took up his 16th position on the grid.

During qualifying, Williams team owner Frank Williams announced that he had concluded a deal with Renault that would see the team have exclusive use of the French company's V10 engines from the 1989 season onwards. It would see the return of the French manufacturer who had pioneered turbocharging in Formula One in 1977, but had left the sport as a manufacturer (team) after 1985 and as an engine supplier following 1986. After having had success with first the Cosworth DFV engine and later with the almost exclusive use of the Honda V6 turbo, Frank Williams said that "for better or worse you need an association with a major manufacturer to be successful in Formula One".

=== Race ===
At the start, Prost led away from Senna, the Ferraris and the Benettons. After ten laps, Berger began having issues with the fuel system of his Ferrari. On lap 19, Senna passed Prost at the L'Epingle hairpin as they came up to traffic, the Brazilian driver thus taking a lead he would not lose. Nannini retired from fourth position on lap 15 with electrical trouble, while Berger retired with similar problems on lap 23. Meanwhile, Mansell passed his old rival Piquet in the Lotus, before his Judd engine failed on lap 29; teammate Riccardo Patrese suffered the same fate four laps later.

On lap 34, Alboreto retired with an engine failure, promoting Boutsen to third. With many of the front runners out, minor teams had a clear chance of scoring points. By the middle of the race Philippe Streiff had brought his AGS up to fifth place, ahead of Andrea de Cesaris' Rial in sixth. However, Streiff retired on lap 41 with a rear suspension failure, while de Cesaris ran out of fuel with three laps to go. This promoted Ivan Capelli in the March to fifth and Jonathan Palmer in the Tyrrell to sixth.

Senna finished just under six seconds ahead of Prost, with Boutsen a further 45 seconds back. Piquet was fourth in the Lotus, albeit a lap down on Senna, with Capelli and Palmer completing the top six. Warwick, despite his injury, finished just outside the points in seventh, having battled with teammate Cheever until the American retired on lap 31 with a broken throttle cable.

Senna set the fastest lap of the race on lap 53 with a time of 1:24.973. Boutsen's third place marked the first time since the 1983 Dutch Grand Prix that a naturally-aspirated car had legally finished on a Formula One podium.

== Classification ==
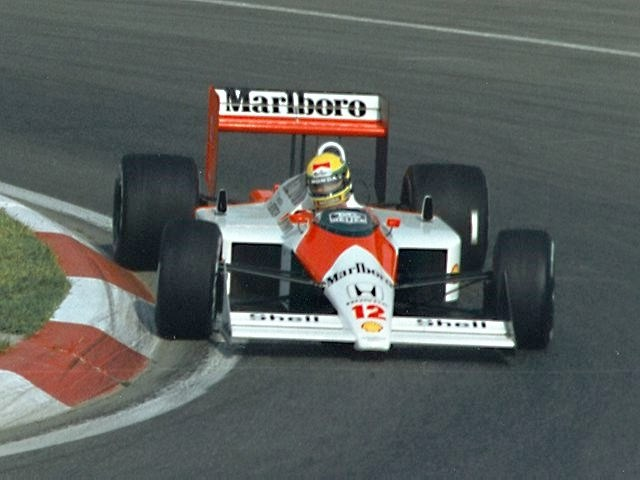
Ayrton Senna took pole position and the race win for McLaren.

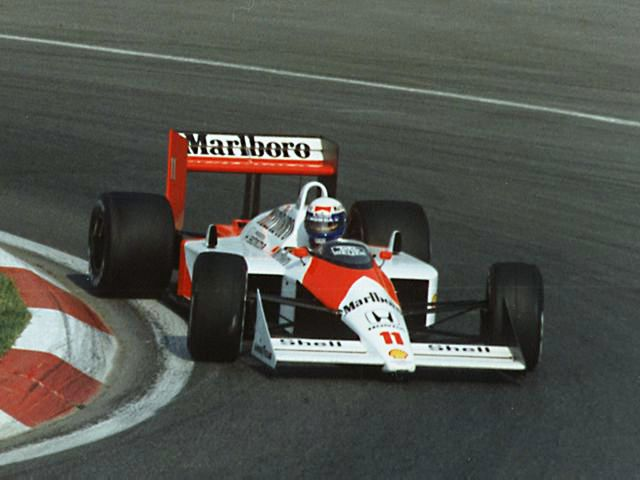
Alain Prost finished just under six seconds behind his team-mate.

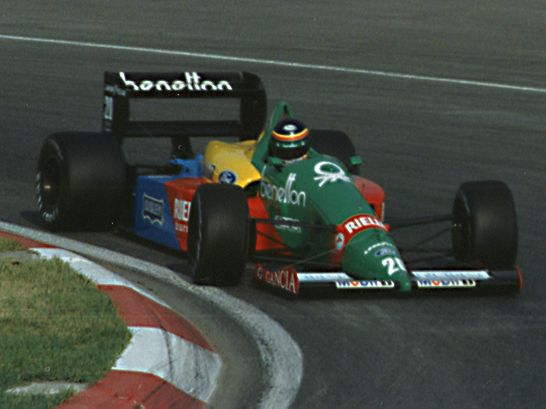
Thierry Boutsen took the final podium position for Benetton.

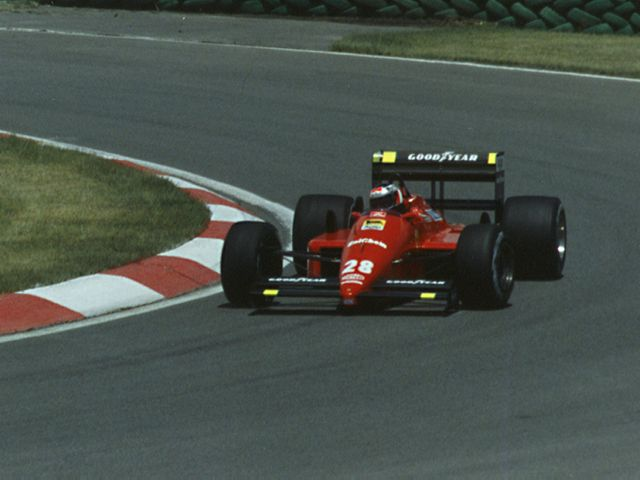
Gerhard Berger retired his Ferrari with electrical problems on lap 23.

=== Pre-qualifying ===
Pos	No	Driver	Constructor	Time	Gap
1	33	(Italy) Stefano Modena	EuroBrun-Ford	1:27.274	—
2	22	(Italy) Andrea de Cesaris	Rial-Ford	1:27.426	+0.152
3	32	(Argentina) Oscar Larrauri	EuroBrun-Ford	1:27.912	+0.638
4	31	(Italy) Gabriele Tarquini	Coloni-Ford	1:28.709	+1.435
DNPQ	36	(Italy) Alex Caffi	Dallara-Ford	1:29.103	+1.829

=== Qualifying ===
Pos	No	Driver	Constructor	Q1	Q2	Gap
1	12	(Brazil) Ayrton Senna	McLaren-Honda	1:22.392	1:21.681	—
2	11	(France) Alain Prost	McLaren-Honda	1:22.499	1:21.863	+0.182
3	28	(Austria) Gerhard Berger	Ferrari	1:22.719	1:22.785	+1.038
4	27	(Italy) Michele Alboreto	Ferrari	1:23.976	1:23.296	+1.615
5	19	(Italy) Alessandro Nannini	Benetton-Ford	1:25.561	1:23.968	+2.287
6	1	(Brazil) Nelson Piquet	Lotus-Honda	1:24.166	1:23.995	+2.314
7	20	(Belgium) Thierry Boutsen	Benetton-Ford	1:25.173	1:24.115	+2.434
8	18	(United States) Eddie Cheever	Arrows-Megatron	1:24.679	1:25.068	+2.998
9	5	(United Kingdom) Nigel Mansell	Williams-Judd	1:24.844	1:25.251	+3.163
10	14	(France) Philippe Streiff	AGS-Ford	1:25.878	1:24.968	+3.287
11	6	(Italy) Riccardo Patrese	Williams-Judd	1:24.971	1:25.471	+3.290
12	22	(Italy) Andrea de Cesaris	Rial-Ford	1:26.039	1:24.988	+3.307
13	2	(Japan) Satoru Nakajima	Lotus-Honda	1:25.373	1:26.650	+3.692
14	16	(Italy) Ivan Capelli	March-Judd	1:25.609	1:26.815	+3.928
15	33	(Italy) Stefano Modena	EuroBrun-Ford	1:26.652	1:25.713	+4.032
16	17	(United Kingdom) Derek Warwick	Arrows-Megatron	1:26.052	1:25.740	+4.059
17	30	(France) Philippe Alliot	Lola-Ford	1:27.543	1:25.765	+4.084
18	15	(Brazil) Maurício Gugelmin	March-Judd	1:25.910	1:25.982	+4.229
19	3	(United Kingdom) Jonathan Palmer	Tyrrell-Ford	1:27.230	1:26.092	+4.411
20	25	(France) René Arnoux	Ligier-Judd	1:26.716	1:26.327	+4.646
21	24	(Spain) Luis Pérez-Sala	Minardi-Ford	1:26.822	1:26.437	+4.756
22	9	(Italy) Piercarlo Ghinzani	Zakspeed	1:28.400	1:26.786	+5.105
23	4	(United Kingdom) Julian Bailey	Tyrrell-Ford	1:28.737	1:27.139	+5.458
24	32	(Argentina) Oscar Larrauri	EuroBrun-Ford	1:27.676	1:27.321	+5.640
25	26	(Sweden) Stefan Johansson	Ligier-Judd	1:28.614	1:27.637	+5.956
26	31	(Italy) Gabriele Tarquini	Coloni-Ford	no time	1:27.655	+5.974
DNQ	23	(Spain) Adrián Campos	Minardi-Ford	1:27.885	1:27.979	+6.204
DNQ	21	(Italy) Nicola Larini	Osella	1:39.782	1:27.981	+6.300
DNQ	29	(France) Yannick Dalmas	Lola-Ford	no time	1:28.012	+6.331
DNQ	10	(West Germany) Bernd Schneider	Zakspeed	1:29.110	1:28.215	+6.534

=== Race ===
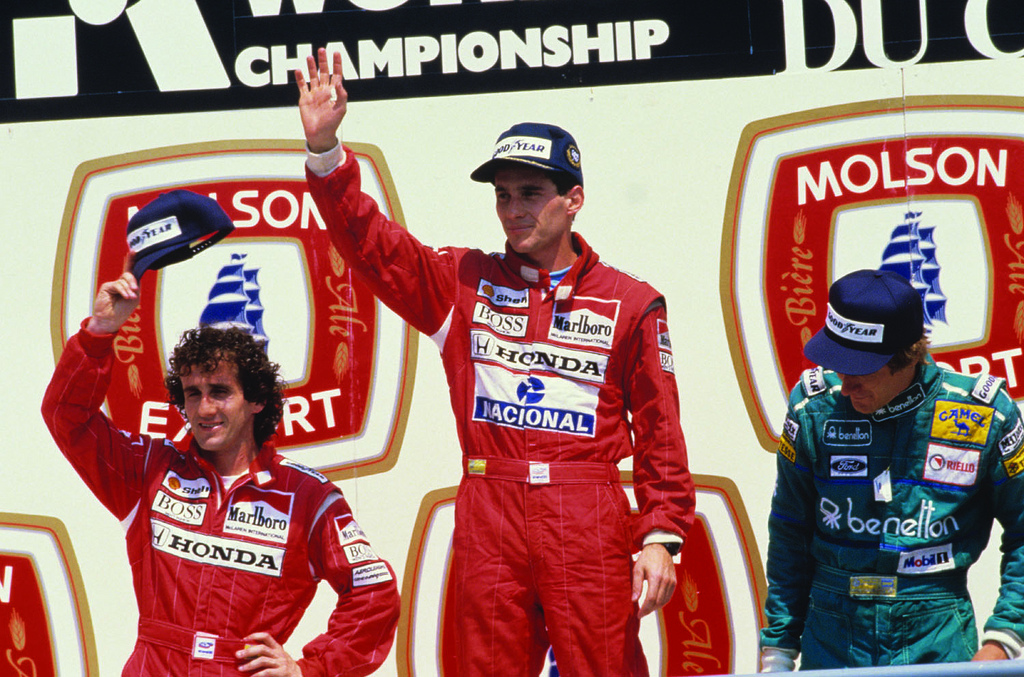
The top 3 drivers of the race: Prost (2nd), Senna (winner), Boutsen (3rd)

Pos	No	Driver	Constructor	Laps	Time/Retired	Grid	Points
1	12	(Brazil) Ayrton Senna	McLaren-Honda	69	1:39:46.618	1	9
2	11	(France) Alain Prost	McLaren-Honda	69	+ 5.934	2	6
3	20	(Belgium) Thierry Boutsen	Benetton-Ford	69	+ 51.409	7	4
4	1	(Brazil) Nelson Piquet	Lotus-Honda	68	+ 1 Lap	6	3
5	16	(Italy) Ivan Capelli	March-Judd	68	+ 1 Lap	14	2
6	3	(United Kingdom) Jonathan Palmer	Tyrrell-Ford	67	+ 2 Laps	19	1
7	17	(United Kingdom) Derek Warwick	Arrows-Megatron	67	+ 2 Laps	16	
8	31	(Italy) Gabriele Tarquini	Coloni-Ford	67	+ 2 Laps	26	
9	22	(Italy) Andrea de Cesaris	Rial-Ford	66	Out of Fuel	12	
10	30	(France) Philippe Alliot	Lola-Ford	66	Electrical	17	
11	2	(Japan) Satoru Nakajima	Lotus-Honda	66	+ 3 Laps	13	
12	33	(Italy) Stefano Modena	EuroBrun-Ford	66	+ 3 Laps	15	
13	24	(Spain) Luis Pérez-Sala	Minardi-Ford	64	+ 5 Laps	21	
14	9	(Italy) Piercarlo Ghinzani	Zakspeed	63	Engine	22	
Ret	15	(Brazil) Maurício Gugelmin	March-Judd	54	Gearbox	18	
Ret	14	(France) Philippe Streiff	AGS-Ford	41	Suspension	10	
Ret	25	(France) René Arnoux	Ligier-Judd	36	Transmission	20	
Ret	27	(Italy) Michele Alboreto	Ferrari	33	Engine	4	
Ret	6	(Italy) Riccardo Patrese	Williams-Judd	32	Engine	11	
Ret	18	(United States) Eddie Cheever	Arrows-Megatron	31	Throttle	8	
Ret	5	(United Kingdom) Nigel Mansell	Williams-Judd	28	Engine	9	
Ret	26	(Sweden) Stefan Johansson	Ligier-Judd	24	Engine	25	
Ret	28	(Austria) Gerhard Berger	Ferrari	22	Electrical	3	
Ret	19	(Italy) Alessandro Nannini	Benetton-Ford	15	Ignition	5	
Ret	32	(Argentina) Oscar Larrauri	EuroBrun-Ford	8	Chassis	24	
Ret	4	(United Kingdom) Julian Bailey	Tyrrell-Ford	0	Collision	23	
DNQ	23	(Spain) Adrián Campos	Minardi-Ford				
DNQ	21	(Italy) Nicola Larini	Osella				
DNQ	29	(France) Yannick Dalmas	Lola-Ford				
DNQ	10	(West Germany) Bernd Schneider	Zakspeed				
DNPQ	36	(Italy) Alex Caffi	Dallara-Ford				

== Championship standings after the race ==
Drivers' Championship standings

Pos	Driver	Points
1	(France) Alain Prost	39
2	(Brazil) Ayrton Senna	24
3	(Austria) Gerhard Berger	18
4	(Brazil) Nelson Piquet	11
5	(Italy) Michele Alboreto	9

Constructors' Championship standings

Pos	Constructor	Points
1	(United Kingdom) McLaren-Honda	63
2	(Italy) Ferrari	27
3	(United Kingdom) Lotus-Honda	12
4	(United Kingdom) Arrows-Megatron	9
5	(United Kingdom) Benetton-Ford	8

- Note: Only the top five positions are included for both sets of standings.

Previous race: 1988 Mexican Grand Prix	FIA Formula One World Championship; 1988 season	Next race: 1988 Detroit Grand Prix
Previous race: 1986 Canadian Grand Prix	Canadian Grand Prix	Next race: 1989 Canadian Grand Prix
