= 1988 British Grand Prix =

- Race 8 of 16 in the 1988 Formula One World Championship
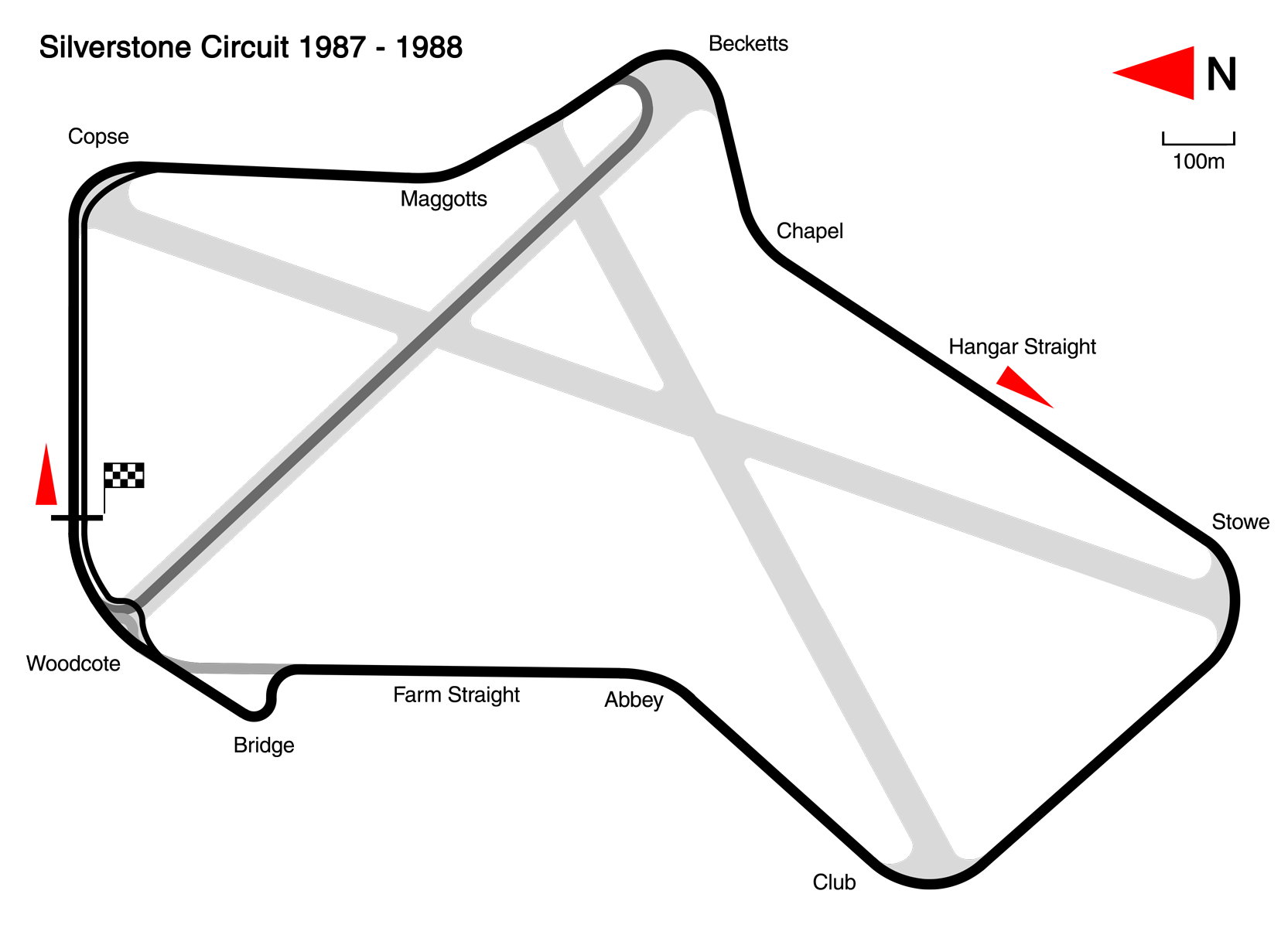

Race details
- Date: 10 July 1988
- Official name: XLI Shell Oils British Grand Prix
- Location: Silverstone Circuit, Silverstone, England
- Course: Permanent racing facility
- Course length: 4.778 km (2.969 miles)
- Distance: 65 laps, 310.570 km (192.979 miles)
- Weather: Wet and cool

Pole position
Driver	(Austria) Gerhard Berger	Ferrari
- Time: 1:10.133

Fastest lap
Driver	(United Kingdom) Nigel Mansell	Williams-Judd
- Time: 1:23.308 on lap 48

Podium
First	(Brazil) Ayrton Senna	McLaren-Honda
Second	(United Kingdom) Nigel Mansell	Williams-Judd
Third	(Italy) Alessandro Nannini	Benetton-Ford

The 1988 British Grand Prix (formally the XLI Shell Oils British Grand Prix) was a Formula One motor race held on 10 July 1988 at the Silverstone Circuit, Silverstone. It was the eighth race of the 1988 FIA Formula One World Championship.

The 65-lap race was won by Ayrton Senna, driving a McLaren-Honda, after starting from third position. The win, Senna's fourth of the season, moved him to within six points of teammate Alain Prost in the Drivers' Championship, Prost having retired before half distance with handling problems. Local driver Nigel Mansell finished second in a Williams-Judd, with Alessandro Nannini third in a Benetton-Ford.

To commemorate the 40th anniversary of the opening of the Silverstone Circuit, many facilities had been added to the circuit, including a Press Centre complex, an internal ring road, debris fencing, wide screens to show live action as broadcast by the BBC, and a 600-metre long hospitality tent for corporate guests. However, the weekend was overshadowed by the death of RAC Chief Executive Peter Hammond in a car crash on the way to the track.

This is the only race of the 1988 season where McLaren-Honda did not secure pole position.

== Qualifying ==
After weeks of speculation, Nigel Mansell announced that he would race for Ferrari in the 1989 season, encouraged to go to the Italian team by a series of high speed accidents on Friday as a result of problems with Williams' reactive suspension, as well as a streak of seven consecutive retirements.

Williams struggled during qualifying. With Mansell only 13th after the Friday session and Riccardo Patrese 30th and last, some 14 seconds from 26th place, the team's Technical Director Patrick Head made a snap decision to dump the reactive suspension until the end of the season. This they did overnight between the Friday and Saturday sessions of the event after previously telling both drivers that changing to the more conventional suspension was next to impossible without months of work. Head said in an interview on race morning that "It's a bodge frankly. We've put steel mechanical springs and dampers on. We've changed the front struts into dampers, designed some new bits and pieces which we machined up overnight. We did some new pistons for the front struts...it's a bit of a bodge as I said".

The grid had an unfamiliar look to it. The McLarens were suffering handling problems because of new bodywork introduced that was more suitable for high speed circuits coming up later in the season. Meanwhile, the Ferraris of Gerhard Berger and Michele Alboreto got the jump on everyone and occupied the front row of the grid. Berger's pole time of 1:10.133 was three seconds slower than the 1987 pole time set by Nelson Piquet. Although on pole, Berger was far from confident going into the race stating that the Ferraris could not live with the McLarens on fuel consumption, words echoed by Alboreto. For his part Alboreto secured his first front row start since he scored pole in the opening race of the 1985 season in Brazil, it was the last time the Italian would start an F1 race from the front row. Senna and Prost qualified in 3rd and 4th place, the first time no McLaren had been on the front row of the grid since the 1987 Mexican Grand Prix and first time in 1988 that neither McLaren was on pole.

During the Friday qualifying session, Senna had two high speed spins at Stowe corner as both he and Prost searched in vain for balance with their cars' new bodywork. The team reverted to the cars having the turbo snorkels for the rest of the weekend which restored some of the cars' balance, but the time lost and the Ferraris with their better top end power put pole out of reach of even Senna. Further testing at Silverstone before the next race in Germany revealed other factors and not the missing snorkels were the cause of the cars' imbalance and the McLarens did not appear with the turbo snorkels for the rest of the season.

The naturally aspirated March-Judds impressed with Maurício Gugelmin qualifying 5th and Ivan Capelli 6th, ahead of the turbos of Lotus and Arrows, while Mansell and Patrese qualified in 11th and 15th respectively with Patrese almost 18 seconds quicker in Saturday qualifying than he was on Friday. Despite Patrick Head describing the converted suspension as a bodge, both Williams drivers expressed their delight at their cars' new 'conventional' suspension, saying it was amazing how much more confidence they had in their cars knowing that they would now behave the same way lap after lap and not different from lap to lap and sometimes corner to corner as it was with the reactive cars.

Both Zakspeed turbos failed to qualify for the race showing the cars' lack of handling and lack of power from the team's own 4 cylinder engines with Bernd Schneider the slowest of the 30 drivers, some 7.9 seconds slower than Berger's Ferrari. His experienced teammate Piercarlo Ghinzani fared little better, being almost 6 seconds slower than the Ferrari. Also failing to make the grid were the EuroBrun of Oscar Larrauri and the Ligier of Stefan Johansson, who complained of lack of grip from his JS31 and was amazed when told that Gugelmin claimed to have taken Club corner flat out in his March which used the same Judd V8 engine as his Ligier. The Coloni of Gabriele Tarquini failed to pre-qualify, despite setting a time faster than what Schneider managed in qualifying.

== Race summary ==
The race was held in pouring rain, the first wet race since the 1985 Belgian Grand Prix. Senna made an excellent start to tail Berger and Alboreto into the first turn. Alboreto had actually beaten Berger away but with the inside line the Austrian pulled ahead through Copse. Senna was soon past the Italian and challenging Berger for the lead. Prost made a poor start, falling back to ninth. On lap 3, Capelli dropped back with electrical trouble.

By lap 14 Gugelmin, Alessandro Nannini and Mansell were fighting for third place. On lap 14, Senna took the lead under the Bridge chicane, overtaking Berger and lapping a slow-running Prost at the same time. Using his skill in wet conditions, Senna managed to pull away and build a lead. On lap 20, Mansell overtook Nannini for fourth, after which the Italian spun at Club and let Gugelmin through. Two laps later, Mansell passed Alboreto for third. On lap 24 Prost retired, claiming handling problems of his McLaren.

"The handling of my car was terrible from the start. Understeer here, oversteer there...I was getting into huge slides, taking huge risks, to run 15th. Why risk a big accident, maybe break a leg or something, and put myself out for the rest of the year – so I can maybe be 12th or something? Everyone does what he wants with his own car and his own life. I know maybe I lost the championship today, but I decided to stop."

— Alain Prost in the McLaren pit following his retirement from the British Grand Prix.

Seeking out the wet parts of the track to cool his tyres, Mansell set the fastest lap of the race on lap 48, at an average speed of 206 km/h. On lap 50, he caught and passed Berger, then held second place until the finish, some 23 seconds behind Senna. Berger was suffering with a fuel deficit and was losing places rapidly. He finally ran out of fuel on the very last corner, dropping from 5th to 9th behind Piquet, Warwick, Cheever and Patrese. The same problem happened to Alboreto, who had run out of fuel on lap 63.

Nannini, despite two further spins, claimed his first Grand Prix podium finish. Gugelmin collected his first World Championship points, and Nelson Piquet and Derek Warwick rounded out the top six.

Mansell's fastest lap time of 1:23.308 was over 13 seconds slower than the lap record of 1:09.832 he set the previous year in dry conditions.

== Classification ==
=== Pre-qualifying ===
Pos	No	Driver	Constructor	Time	Gap
1	22	(Italy) Andrea de Cesaris	Rial-Ford	1:14.123	—
2	36	(Italy) Alex Caffi	Dallara-Ford	1:15.657	+1.534
3	33	(Italy) Stefano Modena	EuroBrun-Ford	1:15.802	+1.679
4	32	(Argentina) Oscar Larrauri	EuroBrun-Ford	1:15.836	+1.713
DNPQ	31	(Italy) Gabriele Tarquini	Coloni-Ford	1:17.028	+1.905

=== Qualifying ===
Pos	No	Driver	Constructor	Q1	Q2	Gap
1	28	(Austria) Gerhard Berger	Ferrari	1:10.746	1:10.133	—
2	27	(Italy) Michele Alboreto	Ferrari	1:10.669	1:10.332	+0.199
3	12	(Brazil) Ayrton Senna	McLaren-Honda	1:10.787	1:10.616	+0.483
4	11	(France) Alain Prost	McLaren-Honda	1:11.550	1:10.736	+0.603
5	15	(Brazil) Maurício Gugelmin	March-Judd	1:11.766	1:11.745	+1.612
6	16	(Italy) Ivan Capelli	March-Judd	1:13.030	1:12.006	+1.873
7	1	(Brazil) Nelson Piquet	Lotus-Honda	1:13.166	1:12.040	+1.907
8	19	(Italy) Alessandro Nannini	Benetton-Ford	1:13.400	1:12.737	+2.604
9	17	(United Kingdom) Derek Warwick	Arrows-Megatron	1:12.843	1:13.287	+2.710
10	2	(Japan) Satoru Nakajima	Lotus-Honda	1:13.192	1:12.862	+2.729
11	5	(United Kingdom) Nigel Mansell	Williams-Judd	1:14.192	1:12.865	+2.732
12	20	(Belgium) Thierry Boutsen	Benetton-Ford	1:12.960	1:12.986	+2.827
13	18	(United States) Eddie Cheever	Arrows-Megatron	1:14.247	1:12.984	+2.851
14	22	(Italy) Andrea de Cesaris	Rial-Ford	1:13.910	1:13.438	+3.305
15	6	(Italy) Riccardo Patrese	Williams-Judd	1:31.541	1:13.677	+3.544
16	14	(France) Philippe Streiff	AGS-Ford	1:15.272	1:14.260	+4.127
17	3	(United Kingdom) Jonathan Palmer	Tyrrell-Ford	1:16.607	1:14.451	+4.318
18	24	(Spain) Luis Pérez-Sala	Minardi-Ford	1:15.590	1:14.643	+4.510
19	23	(Italy) Pierluigi Martini	Minardi-Ford	1:14.732	1:14.832	+4.599
20	33	(Italy) Stefano Modena	EuroBrun-Ford	1:17.889	1:14.888	+4.755
21	36	(Italy) Alex Caffi	Dallara-Ford	1:15.779	1:14.924	+4.791
22	30	(France) Philippe Alliot	Lola-Ford	1:15.635	1:14.992	+4.859
23	29	(France) Yannick Dalmas	Lola-Ford	1:16.014	1:15.004	+4.871
24	4	(United Kingdom) Julian Bailey	Tyrrell-Ford	1:16.249	1:15.135	+5.002
25	25	(France) René Arnoux	Ligier-Judd	1:16.859	1:15.374	+5.241
26	21	(Italy) Nicola Larini	Osella	1:16.780	1:15.527	+5.394
DNQ	32	(Argentina) Oscar Larrauri	EuroBrun-Ford	1:16.691	1:16.026	+5.893
DNQ	9	(Italy) Piercarlo Ghinzani	Zakspeed	1:18.359	1:16.043	+5.910
DNQ	26	(Sweden) Stefan Johansson	Ligier-Judd	1:17.438	1:16.110	+5.977
DNQ	10	(West Germany) Bernd Schneider	Zakspeed	1:19.078	1:18.010	+7.877

=== Race ===
Pos	No	Driver	Constructor	Laps	Time/Retired	Grid	Points
1	12	(Brazil) Ayrton Senna	McLaren-Honda	65	1:33:16.367	3	9
2	5	(United Kingdom) Nigel Mansell	Williams-Judd	65	+ 23.344	11	6
3	19	(Italy) Alessandro Nannini	Benetton-Ford	65	+ 51.214	8	4
4	15	(Brazil) Maurício Gugelmin	March-Judd	65	+ 1:11.378	5	3
5	1	(Brazil) Nelson Piquet	Lotus-Honda	65	+ 1:20.835	7	2
6	17	(United Kingdom) Derek Warwick	Arrows-Megatron	64	+ 1 Lap	9	1
7	18	(United States) Eddie Cheever	Arrows-Megatron	64	+ 1 Lap	13	
8	6	(Italy) Riccardo Patrese	Williams-Judd	64	+ 1 Lap	15	
9	28	(Austria) Gerhard Berger	Ferrari	64	+ 1 Lap	1	
10	2	(Japan) Satoru Nakajima	Lotus-Honda	64	+ 1 Lap	10	
11	36	(Italy) Alex Caffi	Dallara-Ford	64	+ 1 Lap	21	
12	33	(Italy) Stefano Modena	EuroBrun-Ford	64	+ 1 Lap	20	
13	29	(France) Yannick Dalmas	Lola-Ford	63	+ 2 Laps	23	
14	30	(France) Philippe Alliot	Lola-Ford	63	+ 2 Laps	22	
15	23	(Italy) Pierluigi Martini	Minardi-Ford	63	+ 2 Laps	19	
16	4	(United Kingdom) Julian Bailey	Tyrrell-Ford	63	+ 2 Laps	24	
17	27	(Italy) Michele Alboreto	Ferrari	62	Out of fuel	2	
18	25	(France) René Arnoux	Ligier-Judd	62	+ 3 Laps	25	
19	21	(Italy) Nicola Larini	Osella	60	Out of fuel	26	
Ret	20	(Belgium) Thierry Boutsen	Benetton-Ford	38	Transmission	12	
Ret	16	(Italy) Ivan Capelli	March-Judd	34	Alternator	6	
Ret	11	(France) Alain Prost	McLaren-Honda	24	Handling	4	
Ret	3	(United Kingdom) Jonathan Palmer	Tyrrell-Ford	14	Engine	17	
Ret	22	(Italy) Andrea de Cesaris	Rial-Ford	9	Clutch	14	
Ret	14	(France) Philippe Streiff	AGS-Ford	8	Broken wing	16	
Ret	24	(Spain) Luis Pérez-Sala	Minardi-Ford	0	Suspension	18	
DNQ	32	(Argentina) Oscar Larrauri	EuroBrun-Ford				
DNQ	9	(Italy) Piercarlo Ghinzani	Zakspeed				
DNQ	26	(Sweden) Stefan Johansson	Ligier-Judd				
DNQ	10	(West Germany) Bernd Schneider	Zakspeed				
DNPQ	31	(Italy) Gabriele Tarquini	Coloni-Ford				

== Championship standings after the race ==
Drivers' Championship standings

Pos	Driver	Points
1	(France) Alain Prost	54
2	(Brazil) Ayrton Senna	48
3	(Austria) Gerhard Berger	21
4	(Brazil) Nelson Piquet	15
5	(Italy) Michele Alboreto	13

Constructors' Championship standings

Pos	Constructor	Points
1	(United Kingdom) McLaren-Honda	102
2	(Italy) Ferrari	34
3	(United Kingdom) Benetton-Ford	17
4	(United Kingdom) Lotus-Honda	16
5	(United Kingdom) Arrows-Megatron	10

- Note: Only the top five positions are included for both sets of standings.

Previous race: 1988 French Grand Prix	FIA Formula One World Championship; 1988 season	Next race: 1988 German Grand Prix
Previous race: 1987 British Grand Prix	British Grand Prix	Next race: 1989 British Grand Prix
Awards
Preceded by 1987 Japanese Grand Prix	Formula One Promotional Trophy for Race Promoter; 1988	Succeeded by 1989 Japanese Grand Prix
