= 1988 Japanese Grand Prix =

- Race 15 of 16 in the 1988 Formula One World Championship

Race details
- Date: 30 October 1988
- Official name: XIV Fuji Television Japan Grand Prix
- Location: Suzuka Circuit, Suzuka, Japan
- Course: Permanent racing facility
- Course length: 5.860 km (3.641 miles)
- Distance: 51 laps, 298.860 km (185.703 miles)
- Weather: Cool and mainly dry, some rain toward the end
- Attendance: 233,000

Pole position
Driver	(Brazil) Ayrton Senna	McLaren-Honda
- Time: 1:41.853

Fastest lap
Driver	(Brazil) Ayrton Senna	McLaren-Honda
- Time: 1:46.326 on lap 33

Podium
First	(Brazil) Ayrton Senna	McLaren-Honda
Second	(France) Alain Prost	McLaren-Honda
Third	(Belgium) Thierry Boutsen	Benetton-Ford

The 1988 Japanese Grand Prix was a Formula One motor race held at Suzuka Circuit on 30 October 1988. It was the fifteenth and penultimate race of the 1988 season.

The race was won by McLaren's Ayrton Senna, who had clinched his first world championship in doing so. He finished ahead of his teammate and championship rival Alain Prost and Thierry Boutsen from Benetton who came in third. By winning the race, he took his eighth Grand Prix victory of the season, eclipsing the record previously held by Prost in 1984 and Jim Clark in 1963 for the most wins in a season with seven, before his record was beaten by Nigel Mansell in 1992.

== Report ==
=== Qualifying ===
On Honda's home track, the McLarens of Ayrton Senna and Alain Prost filled the front row. Senna's pole time was 1.8 seconds slower than Gerhard Berger's 1987 time.

Just 30 minutes prior to the start of Friday morning's Free Practice session, local hero Satoru Nakajima was informed that his mother had died that morning. That he chose to drive in such circumstances won the much maligned Japanese driver new fans in the F1 paddock.

Berger himself could only manage third on the grid, joined on the second row by Ivan Capelli in the naturally aspirated March-Judd. On the third row were the two Lotus-Hondas of outgoing World Champion Nelson Piquet, who was suffering from a virus, and home town favourite Nakajima. Lotus showed great faith in Nakajima by announcing that they had re-signed him for the 1989 season, despite the fact that they would have to use Judd engines after Honda's decision to supply McLaren exclusively. According to US race broadcaster ESPN throughout the second half of the season after Honda's announcement that they were leaving Lotus, Honda had allegedly offered US$2 million to any team willing to sign Nakajima as a driver.

French driver Yannick Dalmas was declared medically unfit for the race and was replaced in the Larrousse team by Japan's Aguri Suzuki, who was on his way to winning the 1988 Japanese Formula 3000 Championship. Suzuki qualified 20th on his F1 debut, one place behind temporary teammate Philippe Alliot. Dalmas, originally thought to have an ear infection that kept him out of both Japan and the final race in Australia, was diagnosed with Legionnaires' disease later in the year.

=== Race ===
The all-McLaren front row was the 11th of the year, but its drivers had contrasting fortunes. Prost led away from Berger and Capelli, while Senna stalled on the grid. However, Suzuka had the only sloping grid of the year and so the Brazilian was able to bump start his car into action. He had dropped to 14th place, but immediately made a charge through the field, gaining six places by the end of the first lap and then passing Riccardo Patrese, Thierry Boutsen, Alessandro Nannini and Michele Alboreto to run fourth on lap 4. Meanwhile, Derek Warwick and Nigel Mansell collided and had to pit for a puncture and a new nose cone, respectively, while Capelli not only set the fastest lap but also passed Berger – who was already troubled with fuel consumption problems – on lap 5 to move into second place. Alboreto was nudged off track by Thierry Boutsen in the Benetton-Ford on lap 8 while he was in sixth place.

On lap 14 the weather started to come into contention as rain began on parts of the circuit, benefiting Senna. On lap 16 Capelli seized his chance to pass Prost for the lead, the first time a non-turbo car had led a Grand Prix since 1983. Prost had been slowed when Suzuki's Lola had spun at the chicane and got going again just as Prost and Capelli were braking for the tight right-left complex. He then missed a gear coming out of the chicane thanks to a troublesome gearbox and was passed by the March, but Capelli's lead only lasted for a few hundred metres as the extra power of the Honda turbo engine allowed Prost to regain the lead going into the first turn. Capelli made several further attempts to overtake Prost before ultimately retiring three laps later with electrical failure.

Mansell's race lasted until lap 24 when he collided with Piquet's Lotus while trying to lap him. Piquet, still unwell with a virus and complaining of double vision, continued for another ten laps before retiring through fatigue.

By then Senna was catching Prost rapidly, and with traffic, Prost's malfunctioning gearbox, and a tricky wet and dry surface, conditions were favourable to the Brazilian. On lap 27, as they attempted to lap Andrea de Cesaris, Nakajima and Maurício Gugelmin, Senna managed to force his way through as Prost was delayed by de Cesaris's Rial. Senna then put in a succession of fast laps, breaking the former lap record and building a lead of over three seconds, despite being delayed while lapping Nakajima.

With slick tyres on a track that was now wet, Senna gestured for the race to be stopped. The race ran out its entire distance, however, with Senna finishing 13 seconds ahead of Prost. Boutsen took third place, whilst Berger recovered to fourth place after Alboreto held up Nannini, who had to settle for fifth. Patrese finished in sixth, and Nakajima was 7th.

With victory in the race, Senna clinched the World Championship. Due to the scoring system in 1988, Prost could only add three more points to his total even if he won in Australia, which would give him 87 points in total. If Senna then failed to score they would be equal on points, but Senna would still win the title, having taken more wins (8 to 7). Victory in Japan was also Senna's eighth win of the season, which beat the record for total wins in a single season, previously held by Jim Clark (1963) and Prost (1984).

== Classification ==
=== Pre-qualifying ===
Pos	No	Driver	Constructor	Time	Gap
1	36	(Italy) Alex Caffi	Dallara-Ford	1:49.099	—
2	21	(Italy) Nicola Larini	Osella	1:50.288	+1.189
3	32	(Argentina) Oscar Larrauri	EuroBrun-Ford	1:50.942	+1.843
4	33	(Italy) Stefano Modena	EuroBrun-Ford	1:51.141	+2.042
DNPQ	31	(Italy) Gabriele Tarquini	Coloni-Ford	1:52.234	+3.135

=== Qualifying ===
Pos	No	Driver	Constructor	Q1	Q2	Gap
1	12	(Brazil) Ayrton Senna	McLaren-Honda	1:42.157	1:41.853	—
2	11	(France) Alain Prost	McLaren-Honda	1:43.806	1:42.177	+0.324
3	28	(Austria) Gerhard Berger	Ferrari	1:43.548	1:43.353	+1.500
4	16	(Italy) Ivan Capelli	March-Judd	1:44.583	1:43.605	+1.752
5	1	(Brazil) Nelson Piquet	Lotus-Honda	1:45.171	1:43.693	+1.840
6	2	(Japan) Satoru Nakajima	Lotus-Honda	1:45.156	1:43.693	+1.840
7	17	(United Kingdom) Derek Warwick	Arrows-Megatron	1:46.915	1:43.816	+1.963
8	5	(United Kingdom) Nigel Mansell	Williams-Judd	1:44.448	1:43.893	+2.040
9	27	(Italy) Michele Alboreto	Ferrari	1:44.909	1:43.972	+2.119
10	20	(Belgium) Thierry Boutsen	Benetton-Ford	1:44.882	1:44.499	+2.686
11	6	(Italy) Riccardo Patrese	Williams-Judd	1:45.510	1:44.555	+2.702
12	19	(Italy) Alessandro Nannini	Benetton-Ford	1:45.047	1:44.611	+2.758
13	15	(Brazil) Maurício Gugelmin	March-Judd	1:45.138	1:45.156	+3.285
14	22	(Italy) Andrea de Cesaris	Rial-Ford	1:48.393	1:45.558	+3.705
15	18	(United States) Eddie Cheever	Arrows-Megatron	1:45.845	1:46.189	+3.992
16	3	(United Kingdom) Jonathan Palmer	Tyrrell-Ford	1:47.828	1:45.916	+4.063
17	23	(Italy) Pierluigi Martini	Minardi-Ford	1:47.638	1:46.449	+4.596
18	14	(France) Philippe Streiff	AGS-Ford	1:47.583	1:46.486	+4.633
19	30	(France) Philippe Alliot	Lola-Ford	1:47.057	1:46.521	+4.668
20	29	(Japan) Aguri Suzuki	Lola-Ford	1:48.448	1:46.920	+5.067
21	36	(Italy) Alex Caffi	Dallara-Ford	1:47.813	1:46.982	+5.129
22	24	(Spain) Luis Pérez-Sala	Minardi-Ford	1:48.769	1:47.134	+5.281
23	25	(France) René Arnoux	Ligier-Judd	1:49.165	1:47.193	+5.340
24	21	(Italy) Nicola Larini	Osella	1:48.706	1:47.547	+5.694
25	10	(West Germany) Bernd Schneider	Zakspeed	1:49.897	1:47.599	+5.746
26	4	(United Kingdom) Julian Bailey	Tyrrell-Ford	1:49.420	1:48.589	+6.736
DNQ	26	(Sweden) Stefan Johansson	Ligier-Judd	1:49.127	1:48.716	+6.863
DNQ	32	(Argentina) Oscar Larrauri	EuroBrun-Ford	1:50.224	1:49.265	+7.412
DNQ	9	(Italy) Piercarlo Ghinzani	Zakspeed	1:49.706	1:50.550	+7.853
DNQ	33	(Italy) Stefano Modena	EuroBrun-Ford	1:49.812	1:50.047	+7.959

=== Race ===
Pos	No	Driver	Constructor	Laps	Time/Retired	Grid	Points
1	12	(Brazil) Ayrton Senna	McLaren-Honda	51	1:33:26.173	1	9
2	11	(France) Alain Prost	McLaren-Honda	51	+13.363	2	6
3	20	(Belgium) Thierry Boutsen	Benetton-Ford	51	+36.109	10	4
4	28	(Austria) Gerhard Berger	Ferrari	51	+1:26.714	3	3
5	19	(Italy) Alessandro Nannini	Benetton-Ford	51	+1:30.603	12	2
6	6	(Italy) Riccardo Patrese	Williams-Judd	51	+1:37.615	11	1
7	2	(Japan) Satoru Nakajima	Lotus-Honda	50	+1 lap	6	
8	14	(France) Philippe Streiff	AGS-Ford	50	+1 lap	18	
9	30	(France) Philippe Alliot	Lola-Ford	50	+1 lap	19	
10	15	(Brazil) Maurício Gugelmin	March-Judd	50	+1 lap	13	
11	27	(Italy) Michele Alboreto	Ferrari	50	+1 lap	9	
12	3	(United Kingdom) Jonathan Palmer	Tyrrell-Ford	50	+1 lap	16	
13	23	(Italy) Pierluigi Martini	Minardi-Ford	49	+2 laps	17	
14	4	(United Kingdom) Julian Bailey	Tyrrell-Ford	49	+2 laps	26	
15	24	(Spain) Luis Pérez-Sala	Minardi-Ford	49	+2 laps	22	
16	29	(Japan) Aguri Suzuki	Lola-Ford	48	+3 laps	20	
17	25	(France) René Arnoux	Ligier-Judd	48	+3 laps	23	
Ret	22	(Italy) Andrea de Cesaris	Rial-Ford	36	Overheating	14	
Ret	18	(United States) Eddie Cheever	Arrows-Megatron	35	Ignition	15	
Ret	21	(Italy) Nicola Larini	Osella	34	Brakes	24	
Ret	1	(Brazil) Nelson Piquet	Lotus-Honda	34	Driver unwell	5	
Ret	5	(United Kingdom) Nigel Mansell	Williams-Judd	24	Collision	8	
Ret	36	(Italy) Alex Caffi	Dallara-Ford	22	Spun off	21	
Ret	16	(Italy) Ivan Capelli	March-Judd	19	Electrical	4	
Ret	17	(United Kingdom) Derek Warwick	Arrows-Megatron	16	Spun off	7	
Ret	10	(Germany) Bernd Schneider	Zakspeed	14	Driver unfit	25	
DNQ	26	(Sweden) Stefan Johansson	Ligier-Judd				
DNQ	32	(Argentina) Oscar Larrauri	EuroBrun-Ford				
DNQ	9	(Italy) Piercarlo Ghinzani	Zakspeed				
DNQ	33	(Italy) Stefano Modena	EuroBrun-Ford				
DNPQ	31	(Italy) Gabriele Tarquini	Coloni-Ford				

== Championship standings after the race ==
- **Bold text** indicates the World Champions.

Drivers' Championship standings

Pos	Driver	Points
1	(Brazil) **Ayrton Senna**	87 (88)
2	(France) Alain Prost	84 (96)
3	(Austria) Gerhard Berger	41
4	(Belgium) Thierry Boutsen	29
5	(Italy) Michele Alboreto	24

Constructors' Championship standings

Pos	Constructor	Points
1	(United Kingdom) **McLaren-Honda**	184
2	(Italy) Ferrari	65
3	(United Kingdom) Benetton-Ford	44
4	(United Kingdom) Arrows-Megatron	20
5	(United Kingdom) March-Judd	19

- Note: Only the top five positions are included for both sets of standings. Drivers could only count their best 11 results; numbers without parentheses are Championship points; numbers in parentheses are total points scored. Points accurate at final declaration of results. The Benettons were subsequently disqualified from the Belgian Grand Prix and their points reallocated.

Previous race: 1988 Spanish Grand Prix	FIA Formula One World Championship; 1988 season	Next race: 1988 Australian Grand Prix
Previous race: 1987 Japanese Grand Prix	Japanese Grand Prix	Next race: 1989 Japanese Grand Prix
