= 1988 Detroit Grand Prix =

- Race 6 of 16 in the 1988 Formula One World Championship
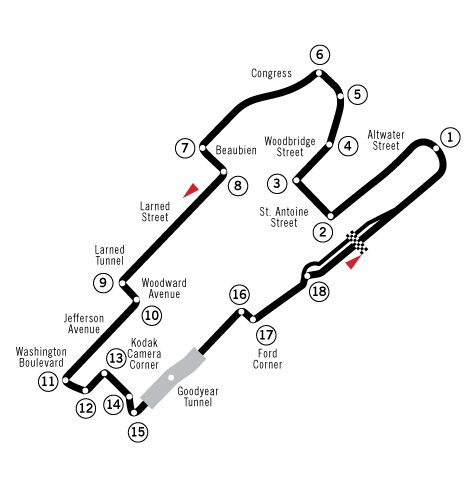

Race details
- Date: June 19, 1988
- Official name: 7th Enichem Detroit Grand Prix
- Location: Detroit Street Circuit; Detroit, Michigan
- Course: Temporary street course
- Course length: 4.023 km (2.5 miles)
- Distance: 63 laps, 253.449 km (157.5 miles)
- Weather: Warm and sunny with temperatures up to 91.9 °F (33.3 °C); wind speeds up to 11.1 miles per hour (17.9 km/h)

Pole position
Driver	(Brazil) Ayrton Senna	McLaren-Honda
- Time: 1:40.606

Fastest lap
Driver	(France) Alain Prost	McLaren-Honda
- Time: 1:44.836 on lap 4

Podium
First	(Brazil) Ayrton Senna	McLaren-Honda
Second	(France) Alain Prost	McLaren-Honda
Third	(Belgium) Thierry Boutsen	Benetton-Ford

The 1988 Detroit Grand Prix was a Formula One motor race held on June 19, 1988, in Detroit, Michigan. It was the sixth race of the 1988 Formula One season and the last of three back-to-back races in the continent of North America.

== Summary ==
=== Qualifying ===
Ayrton Senna's third win of the season made it six out of six for McLaren in 1988, on the way to an unprecedented 15 wins and ten 1-2 finishes in 16 races. Senna's victory matched the season total of teammate Alain Prost, who finished 38 seconds behind the Brazilian in second place. Thierry Boutsen took third for Benetton, as he had a week before in Canada, and Andrea de Cesaris scored the first points ever for the Rial team by finishing fourth. Minardi also scored their first point with Pierluigi Martini's sixth place.

With turbocharged engines scheduled to be eliminated prior to 1989, and their effectiveness intended to be curtailed by two rule changes for 1988, few teams opted to develop totally new equipment that would only be used for one season. Only Honda, who defected to McLaren from defending Constructor's Champion Williams, and Ferrari developed new engines to meet the revised turbo rules– boost reduced from 4 bars to 2.5, and fuel capacity reduced from 195 liters to 150 (refueling was banned from 1984 through 1993), and only McLaren developed a completely new chassis. Though the new rules were intended to narrow or eliminate the performance gap between the turbos and the normally aspirated engines, Honda and Ferrari were able to display a 50 horsepower (37 kW) advantage over the best 3.5-liter equipment of the opposition. With that kind of power differential, the only new chassis in the field, and Senna and Prost behind the wheel, McLaren quickly turned the season into a two-man show.

Detroit's tight 90-degree turns and short straight sections had given the underpowered "atmo" cars a chance at several times during the turbo era, and some teams were hoping that the circuit would offer them a chance. Senna took the 22nd pole of his career by more than eight-tenths of a second, but the Ferraris of Gerhard Berger and Michele Alboreto both lined up ahead of Prost, who was fourth and openly admitted that he simply did not like the circuit. The teams were all hoping for cooler temperatures for the race on Sunday, after the track had begun to break up during qualifying, expedited by a Trans-Am race on Saturday. There was a push from the F1 teams to have the Trans-Am race cancelled, but with that series having guaranteed television coverage of each round (of which Detroit was a part), the race went ahead and as feared, the powerful, heavy saloons tore the track surface up even more. Hasty concrete repairs made the surface extremely abrasive for the soft compound tires most teams had brought, and teams were forced to reconsider their plans for a non-stop race. On Sunday morning, Berger said, "Really, I think today is a lottery.... which probably gives us our best chance of the season."

Ivan Capelli broke a bone in his left foot when he crashed into the pit wall during Saturday practice, having set a time in Friday qualifying that would have put him 21st on the grid. Nicola Larini was thus promoted to the last grid spot.

=== Race ===
In front of 61,000 fans on race day, Senna took the lead off the grid. The Ferraris held onto second and third before Prost got by Alboreto on lap 5, and Berger on lap 6. By then, Senna was over six seconds ahead.

On lap 7 Boutsen, having already passed Alboreto, attempted to pass Berger as well, but his Benetton hit the Ferrari's left rear wheel and punctured the tire, sending Berger into retirement. Two laps later, Boutsen's team-mate Alessandro Nannini collided with Alboreto while trying to overtake him. Both cars continued, but on lap 15 Nannini pitted with a damaged right front suspension and failing brakes. Alboreto continued until lap 46 when he spun off, having worked his way back up to seventh.

The collisions enabled Nigel Mansell to move up to fourth in the Williams, only for his Judd engine to fail on lap 19. Team-mate Riccardo Patrese assumed the position until lap 27, when he suffered an electrical failure.

Any hope of a threat to the McLarens was gone. The red and white cars, with Senna eight seconds ahead, seemed to be carefree. In fact, Prost had been struggling the entire race with an uncooperative gearchange. "It was strange– the gearbox felt as though it was seizing up. The worst change was from fourth to fifth, which I think I missed at least once a lap right the way through."

Pierluigi Martini, driving in his first Grand Prix in almost three years, was running extremely well for Minardi and got up to fifth place on lap 35 when Maurício Gugelmin's March retired. He would likely have finished there, if not for the relentless and resilient performance of Jonathan Palmer for Tyrrell. Palmer had come together with Stefano Modena in the EuroBrun on the first lap, requiring a stop to replace the nosecone, and leaving him dead last by a sizable margin. By lap 47, he had worked his way into the points, and in the closing laps, he was the fastest car on the circuit. Palmer's two points for fifth place were his reward for what was probably the most impressive performance of the race.

Senna and Prost both had time to make leisurely stops for new tires, and Senna went on to lead all 63 laps. Prost finished nearly 40 seconds behind Senna, despite setting the fastest lap of the race on lap 4; no other drivers finished on the lead lap. Prost said, "Over the years I've developed a style of driving which involves braking into the apex of a corner. I don't think most of the guys do that, but it works for me. On this surface today, though, it was impossible to do it without simply sliding straight on. So I had to change my whole way of driving, brake carefully in a straight line, then turn in. No excuse, you understand, but it meant adapting, doing something which isn't my natural style."

The drivers became outspoken about their dislike of the race. Senna likened the last laps to driving in heavy rain as the track had broken up so badly, while he, Prost and Boutsen argued that if Formula One wanted to stay in Detroit, it needed to move elsewhere in the city. Even though there were some negotiations to move the event to another street circuit on nearby Belle Isle, these plans ultimately fell through, and thus this was the last Formula One Detroit Grand Prix. For the next three years, F1 raced at a street circuit in Phoenix, Arizona, in an event officially known as the United States Grand Prix.

The Detroit street circuit hosted three CART races in 1989, 1990 and 1991 (the unpopular chicane before the pits being removed), before CART moved to the Belle Isle Circuit in 1992.

== Classification ==
=== Pre-qualifying ===
Pos	No	Driver	Constructor	Time	Gap
1	36	(Italy) Alex Caffi	Dallara-Ford	1:46.280	—
2	33	(Italy) Stefano Modena	EuroBrun-Ford	1:46.522	+0.242
3	32	(Argentina) Oscar Larrauri	EuroBrun-Ford	1:46.650	+0.370
4	22	(Italy) Andrea de Cesaris	Rial-Ford	1:46.709	+0.429
DNPQ	31	(Italy) Gabriele Tarquini	Coloni-Ford	1:47.312	+1.032

=== Qualifying ===
Pos	No	Driver	Constructor	Q1	Q2	Gap
1	12	(Brazil) Ayrton Senna	McLaren-Honda	1:40.606	1:41.719	—
2	28	(Austria) Gerhard Berger	Ferrari	1:42.283	1:41.464	+0.858
3	27	(Italy) Michele Alboreto	Ferrari	1:43.925	1:41.700	+1.094
4	11	(France) Alain Prost	McLaren-Honda	1:42.019	1:43.420	+1.413
5	20	(Belgium) Thierry Boutsen	Benetton-Ford	1:45.718	1:42.690	+2.084
6	5	(United Kingdom) Nigel Mansell	Williams-Judd	1:43.458	1:42.697	+2.091
7	19	(Italy) Alessandro Nannini	Benetton-Ford	1:43.117	1:45.345	+2.511
8	1	(Brazil) Nelson Piquet	Lotus-Honda	1:44.352	1:43.314	+2.708
9	17	(United Kingdom) Derek Warwick	Arrows-Megatron	1:44.614	1:43.799	+3.193
10	6	(Italy) Riccardo Patrese	Williams-Judd	1:43.810	1:45.016	+3.204
11	14	(France) Philippe Streiff	AGS-Ford	1:44.204	1:44.743	+3.598
12	22	(Italy) Andrea de Cesaris	Rial-Ford	1:45.866	1:44.216	+3.610
13	15	(Brazil) Maurício Gugelmin	March-Judd	1:44.474	1:53.243	+3.868
14	30	(France) Philippe Alliot	Lola-Ford	1:44.590	3:40.532	+3.984
15	18	(United States) Eddie Cheever	Arrows-Megatron	1:45.159	1:44.948	+4.342
16	23	(Italy) Pierluigi Martini	Minardi-Ford	1:47.094	1:45.049	+4.443
17	3	(United Kingdom) Jonathan Palmer	Tyrrell-Ford	1:45.268	1:45.662	+4.662
18	26	(Sweden) Stefan Johansson	Ligier-Judd	1:45.275	1:47.135	+4.669
19	33	(Italy) Stefano Modena	EuroBrun-Ford	1:45.304		+4.698
20	25	(France) René Arnoux	Ligier-Judd	1:45.437	1:47.483	+4.831
21	36	(Italy) Alex Caffi	Dallara-Ford	1:47.493	1:45.750	+5.144
22	4	(United Kingdom) Julian Bailey	Tyrrell-Ford	1:46.286	1:47.801	+5.680
23	32	(Argentina) Oscar Larrauri	EuroBrun-Ford	1:46.390	1:48.116	+5.784
24	29	(France) Yannick Dalmas	Lola-Ford	1:46.422	1:46.447	+5.816
25	24	(Spain) Luis Pérez-Sala	Minardi-Ford	1:48.186	1:46.593	+5.987
26	21	(Italy) Nicola Larini	Osella	1:46.623	1:51.623	+6.017
DNQ	2	(Japan) Satoru Nakajima	Lotus-Honda	1:47.243	1:49.353	+6.637
DNQ	10	(West Germany) Bernd Schneider	Zakspeed	1:48.423	1:48.249	+7.643
DNQ	9	(Italy) Piercarlo Ghinzani	Zakspeed	1:48.925	1:48.990	+8.319
DNS	16	(Italy) Ivan Capelli	March-Judd	1:45.546		+4.940

=== Race ===
Pos	No	Driver	Constructor	Laps	Time/Retired	Grid	Points
1	12	(Brazil) Ayrton Senna	McLaren-Honda	63	1:54:56.035	1	9
2	11	(France) Alain Prost	McLaren-Honda	63	+ 38.713	4	6
3	20	(Belgium) Thierry Boutsen	Benetton-Ford	62	+ 1 Lap	5	4
4	22	(Italy) Andrea de Cesaris	Rial-Ford	62	+ 1 Lap	12	3
5	3	(United Kingdom) Jonathan Palmer	Tyrrell-Ford	62	+ 1 Lap	17	2
6	23	(Italy) Pierluigi Martini	Minardi-Ford	62	+ 1 Lap	16	1
7	29	(France) Yannick Dalmas	Lola-Ford	61	+ 2 Laps	24	
8	36	(Italy) Alex Caffi	Dallara-Ford	61	+ 2 Laps	21	
9	4	(United Kingdom) Julian Bailey	Tyrrell-Ford	59	Spun Off	22	
Ret	24	(Spain) Luis Pérez-Sala	Minardi-Ford	54	Gearbox	25	
Ret	30	(France) Philippe Alliot	Lola-Ford	46	Halfshaft	14	
Ret	33	(Italy) Stefano Modena	EuroBrun-Ford	46	Spun Off	19	
Ret	27	(Italy) Michele Alboreto	Ferrari	45	Collision	3	
Ret	25	(France) René Arnoux	Ligier-Judd	45	Overheating	20	
Ret	15	(Brazil) Maurício Gugelmin	March-Judd	34	Engine	13	
Ret	6	(Italy) Riccardo Patrese	Williams-Judd	26	Electrical	10	
Ret	1	(Brazil) Nelson Piquet	Lotus-Honda	26	Spun Off	8	
Ret	32	(Argentina) Oscar Larrauri	EuroBrun-Ford	26	Gearbox	23	
Ret	17	(United Kingdom) Derek Warwick	Arrows-Megatron	24	Spun Off	9	
Ret	5	(United Kingdom) Nigel Mansell	Williams-Judd	18	Engine	6	
Ret	14	(France) Philippe Streiff	AGS-Ford	15	Suspension	11	
Ret	19	(Italy) Alessandro Nannini	Benetton-Ford	14	Suspension	7	
Ret	18	(United States) Eddie Cheever	Arrows-Megatron	14	Electrical	15	
Ret	21	(Italy) Nicola Larini	Osella	7	Engine	26	
Ret	28	(Austria) Gerhard Berger	Ferrari	6	Puncture	2	
Ret	26	(Sweden) Stefan Johansson	Ligier-Judd	2	Overheating	18	
DNS	16	(Italy) Ivan Capelli	March-Judd	0	Driver Injured		
DNQ	2	(Japan) Satoru Nakajima	Lotus-Honda				
DNQ	10	(West Germany) Bernd Schneider	Zakspeed				
DNQ	9	(Italy) Piercarlo Ghinzani	Zakspeed				
DNPQ	31	(Italy) Gabriele Tarquini	Coloni-Ford				

== Championship standings after the race ==
Drivers' Championship standings

Pos	Driver	Points
1	(France) Alain Prost	45
2	(Brazil) Ayrton Senna	33
3	(Austria) Gerhard Berger	18
4	(Belgium) Thierry Boutsen	11
5	(Brazil) Nelson Piquet	11

Constructors' Championship standings

Pos	Constructor	Points
1	(United Kingdom) McLaren-Honda	78
2	(Italy) Ferrari	27
3	(United Kingdom) Benetton-Ford	12
4	(United Kingdom) Lotus-Honda	12
5	(United Kingdom) Arrows-Megatron	9

- Note: Only the top five positions are included for both sets of standings.

Previous race: 1988 Canadian Grand Prix	FIA Formula One World Championship; 1988 season	Next race: 1988 French Grand Prix
Previous race: 1987 Detroit Grand Prix	Detroit Grand Prix	Next race: N/A
