= 1984 Italian Formula Three Championship =

Italian F3

Seasons
- ← 1983 1985 →

The 1984 Italian Formula Three Championship was the 21st Italian Formula Three Championship. It began on 25 March at Vallelunga and ended on 28 October at Misano after twelve races. The championship was won by the Alessandro Santin from Coloni, who drove a Ralt RT3/83-Alfa Romeo and a RT3/84-Alfa Romeo.

== Calendar ==
| Round | Grand Prix | Circuit | Laps | Date | Note |
|---|---|---|---|---|---|
| 1 | Gran Premio Campidoglio | Autodromo Vallelunga, Campagnano di Roma | 14+38 | 25 March | The race consisted of qualifying race with 14 laps, then the final race with 38 laps |
| 2 | | Autodromo Internazionale del Mugello, Scarperia | 23 | 8 April | |
| 3 | | Autodromo Santa Monica, Misano Adriatico | 12+35 | 23 April | The race consisted of qualifying race with 12 laps, then the final race with 35 laps |
| 4 | Gran Premio del Mugello | Autodromo Internazionale del Mugello, Scarperia | 23 | 13 May | |
| 5 | Premio Monza | Autodromo Nazionale, Monza | 8+16 | 27 May | The race consisted of qualifying race with 8 laps, then the final race with 16 laps |
| 6 | | Autodromo di Magione | 25+61 | 10 June | The race consisted of qualifying race with 25 laps, then the final race with 51 laps |
| 7 | Trofeo Banca Agricola Mantovana | Autodromo di Varano de' Melegari | 23+56 | 17 June | The race consisted of qualifying race with 23 laps, then the final race with 56 laps |
| 8 | Gran Premio di Enna | Autodromo di Pergusa | 25 | 8 July | |
| 9 | | Autodromo di Varano de' Melegari | 23+56 | 16 September | The race consisted of qualifying race with 23 laps, then the final race with 56 laps |
| 10 | Gran Premio Campagnano; Trofeo Ignazio Giunti | Autodromo Vallelunga, Campagnano di Roma | 14+38 | 30 September | The race consisted of qualifying race with 14 laps, then the final race with 38 laps |
| 11 | | Autodromo Dino Ferrari, Imola | 25 | 14 October | |
| 12 | | Autodromo Santa Monica, Misano Adriatico | 12+35 | 28 October | The race consisted of qualifying race with 12 laps, then the final race with 35 laps |

- All races are held in Italy.

== Drivers and teams ==
| Team | Chassis | No. | Driver | Rounds |
|---|---|---|---|---|
| Venturini Racing | Dallara F384- Alfa Romeo | 2 | (Switzerland) Franco Forini | All |
| Venturini Racing | Dallara F384- Alfa Romeo | 7 | (Italy) Fabrizio Barbazza | All |
| Gulf Coloni; Enzo Coloni Racing Car Systems | Ralt RT3- Alfa Romeo | 3 | (Italy) Alfredo Sebastiani | 3 |
| Gulf Coloni; Enzo Coloni Racing Car Systems | Ralt RT3/83- Alfa Romeo; Ralt RT3/84-Alfa Romeo | 5 | (Italy) Alessandro Santin | All |
| Gulf Coloni; Enzo Coloni Racing Car Systems | Ralt RT3/84- Alfa Romeo | 14 | (Peru) Ernesto Jochamowitz | All |
| Gulf Coloni; Enzo Coloni Racing Car Systems | Martini Mk42- Alfa Romeo | 74 | (Italy) Ivan Capelli | 12 |
| Alfredo Sebastiani | Ralt RT3- Alfa Romeo | 3 | (Italy) Alfredo Sebastiani | 5 |
| Automotor | Ralt RT3/84- Volkswagen Brabham Judd | 4 | (Italy) Walter Voulaz | 1–2 |
| Automotor | Ralt RT3/84- Volkswagen Brabham Judd | 42 | (Italy) Franco Scapini | 3–12 |
| Automotor | Ralt RT3/84- Volkswagen Brabham Judd | | (Italy) Claudio Antonioli | All |
| Automotor | Ralt RT3/84- Volkswagen Brabham Judd | | (Italy) Danilo Frassoni | 6–12 |
| Astofer Corse | Ralt RT3/83- Alfa Romeo | 4 | (Italy) Walter Voulaz | 9–11 |
| Astofer Corse | Ralt RT3/83- Alfa Romeo | | (Italy) "Asteldo" | 1–2, 3–6 |
| Prema Racing | Ralt RT3/84- Volkswagen Brabham Judd | 16 | (Italy) Gianfranco Tacchino | All |
| Prema Racing | Ralt RT3/83- Volkswagen Brabham Judd | | (Italy) Roberto Marazzi | 1 |
| Coperchini Corse | Ralt RT3/84- Alfa Romeo | 23 | (Italy) Marco Apicella | All |
| Euroteam | Ralt RT3/84- Alfa Romeo | 27 | (Italy) Alex Caffi | All |
| Euroteam | Ralt RT3/84- Alfa Romeo | | (United States) Joe Sulentic | 2–12 |
| Team ELF Alloni | Dallara F384- Toyota | 34 | (Italy) Luca Melgrati | 1–6, 9 |
| Team ELF Alloni | Dallara F384- Toyota | 42 | (Italy) Franco Scapini | 1 |
| Team ELF Alloni | Dallara F384- Toyota | | (Italy) Nino Famà | 1–7 |
| Team ELF Alloni | Dallara F384- Toyota | | (Italy) Gabriele Tarquini | 10 |
| Accardi | Ralt | | (Italy) Accardi | 10 |
| Amadori | Ralt RT3-Lancia | | (Italy) Amadori | 9 |
| Giovanna Amati | Ralt RT3-Volkswagen Brabham Judd | | (Italy) Giovanna Amati | 9–12 |
| Ermanno Alboreto | Ralt RT3-Alfa Romeo | | (Italy) Ermanno Alboreto | 12 |
| Arno Racing | Arno 02384/A- Alfa Romeo | | (Italy) Fabio Mancini | 1–7, 9–12 |
| Arno Racing | Arno 02384/A- Alfa Romeo | | (Italy) Rocco Verduci | 1, 6–7, 9–12 |
| Arno Racing | Arno 02384/A- Alfa Romeo | | (Italy) Luigi Giannini | 1–7, 9–10, 12 |
| Autolario Racing | Ralt RT3/84- Alfa Romeo | | (Italy) Maurizio Manfredi | 2–7, 9–10 |
| Autolario Racing | Ralt RT3/84- Alfa Romeo | | (Italy) Nicola Carboni | 2–4 |
| Autolario Racing | Ralt RT3/84- Toyota | | (Italy) Nino Famà | 10 |
| Pasquale Barberio | Ralt | | (Italy) Pasquale Barberio | 1 |
| Barella | Ralt RT3/84- Alfa Romeo | | (Italy) Pierluigi Massa | 1 |
| Giovanni Bertaccini | Dallara F382- Toyota | | (Italy) Giovanni Bertaccini | 5 |
| Carlo Betti | Dallara F382- Toyota | | (Italy) Carlo Betti | 2 |
| Bielli | Ralt RT3/83- Volkswagen Brabham Judd | | (Italy) Danilo Frassoni | 4–5 |
| Bienati | Ralt RT3/83- Alfa Romeo; Ralt RT3/83- Toyota | | (Italy) Giuseppe Arlotti | 2–5 |
| Bienati | Ralt RT3/82- Alfa Romeo | | (Italy) Aldo Venzi | 4 |
| Marco Brand | Ralt RT3- Volkswagen Brabham Judd | | (Italy) Marco Brand | 5 |
| Equipo Campsa | Ralt RT3/84- Alfa Romeo | | (Spain) Luis Pérez-Sala | 12 |
| Carlini | Dallara-Alfa Romeo | | (Italy) Carlini | 12 |
| Fernando Cazzaniga | Ralt RT3- Alfa Romeo | | (Italy) Fernando Cazzaniga | 5 |
| Juan Manuel Fangio II | Ralt RT3- Alfa Romeo | | (Argentina) Juan Manuel Fangio II | 7, 9, 11 |
| Giovanni Fossati | Dallara – Toyota | | (Italy) Giovanni Fossati | 5, 7, 9 |
| Roberto Frangapane | Ralt RT3 | | (Italy) Roberto Frangapane | 10 |
| Gianni Fusetti | Ralt RT3- Fiat; Ralt RT3- Lancia | | (Italy) Gianni Fusetti | 3, 5 |
| Marco Gatta | Alba AR1- Alfa Romeo | | (Italy) Marco Gatta | 9 |
| Antonio Giglio | Ralt RT3- Alfa Romeo | | (Italy) Antonio Giglio | 5 |
| Team Grifo | Ralt RT3- Alfa Romeo | | (Italy) Sergio Morzani | 10 |
| Guarino | March M783- Toyota | | (Italy) Guarino | 8 |
| Jolly Club | Ralt RT3/84- Alfa Romeo | | (Italy) Rodolfo Manni | 1–2, 9–11 |
| Jolly Club | Ralt RT3/82- Alfa Romeo | | (Italy) Ludwig | 1–2, 5 |
| Jolly Club | Ralt RT3/83- Alfa Romeo | | (Italy) Giorgio Montaldo | 1–2, 5, 10–12 |
| Roberto Lanzetti | Ralt RT3- Alfa Romeo | | (Italy) Roberto Lanzetti | 12 |
| Nicola Larini | Ralt RT3- Alfa Romeo | | (Italy) Nicola Larini | 12 |
| Giovanni Lavaggi | Dallara F384- Toyota | | (Italy) Giovanni Lavaggi | 11–12 |
| Luca Maggiorelli | Ralt RT3- Alfa Romeo | | (Italy) Luca Maggiorelli | 12 |
| MARCO | Ralt RT3/84- Alfa Romeo | | (Italy) Marco Melito | 1–7, 9–12 |
| MARCO | Euroracing 101- Alfa Romeo | | (Italy) Nicolò Bianco | 1–4, 6 |
| Nicola Marozzo | Ralt RT3- Alfa Romeo | | (Italy) Nicola Marozzo | 1, 5–10, 12 |
| Alfredo Merelli | Ralt RT3- Alfa Romeo | | (Italy) Alfredo Merelli | 5 |
| Team Merzario | Merzario Ralt RT3- Alfa Romeo | | (Italy) Stefano Livio | 1, 5 |
| Team Merzario | Merzario Ralt RT3- Alfa Romeo | | (Italy) Ernesto Catella | 1–2 |
| Team Merzario | Merzario Ralt RT3- Alfa Romeo | | (Italy) Arturo Merzario | 2 |
| Mezzini | Ralt RT3- Toyota | | (Italy) Mezzini | 3 |
| Luigi Moreschi | Anson SA4- Alfa Romeo | | (Italy) Luigi Moreschi | 8 |
| Luca Moretti | Ralt RT3/83- Toyota | | (Italy) Luca Moretti | 11 |
| Marino Mura | Ralt RT3- Alfa Romeo | | (Italy) Marino Mura | 4 |
| Stefano Nisini | Ralt RT3- Alfa Romeo | | (Italy) Stefano Nisini | 10 |
| Giorgio Pirola | Ralt RT3/82- Lancia | | (Italy) Giovanna Amati | 1–2, 4–5, 7 |
| Pupa | Anson SA4- Alfa Romeo | | (Italy) "Pupa" | 3–6 |
| Ferdinando Romero | Ralt RT3- Alfa Romeo | | (Italy) Ferdinando Romero | 12 |
| RS Tuning | Ralt RT3/83- Toyota | | (Italy) Enrico Bertaggia | 1–3, 5, 9–12 |
| Scuderia Salvati | Ralt RT3/83- Toyota | | (Italy) Rocco Verduci | 2–4 |
| Fernando Spreafico | Dallara F382- Toyota; Dallara F384- Toyota | | (Italy) Gabriele Tarquini | 1, 3–7 |
| Nicola Tesini | Ralt RT3- Alfa Romeo | | (Italy) Nicola Tesini | 12 |
| Paolo Urioni | Ralt RT3- Volkswagen Brabham Judd | | (Italy) Paolo Urioni | 8 |
| Varona | Dallara F384- Alfa Romeo | | (Italy) Amedeo Marcotulli | 1, 3, 6 |
| Gerardo Vatielli | Ralt RT3- Alfa Romeo | | (Italy) Gerardo Vatielli | 10–11 |
| Giorgio Vergani | Euroracing 101- Alfa Romeo; Dallara-Alfa Romeo | | (Italy) Giorgio Vergani | 5, 12 |
| Andrea Verna | Ralt RT3- Alfa Romeo | | (Italy) Andrea Verna | 12 |
| Scuderia Vesuvio; Vesuvio Racing | Ralt RT3- Alfa Romeo | | (Italy) Antonio Padrone | 1, 9–10 |
| Scuderia Vesuvio; Vesuvio Racing | Ralt RT3- Alfa Romeo | | (Italy) Paolo Giangrossi | 10–12 |
| Giacomo Vismara | Ralt RT3/83- Volkswagen Brabham Judd | | (Italy) Giaocomo Vismara | 1–7 |
| Wainer Racing | Wainer WM10- Alfa Romeo | | (Italy) Marino Mantovani | 3, 7, 9 |
| | Anson – Alfa Romeo | | (Italy) Bruno Corradi | 2 |

== Results and standings ==
=== Results ===
| Round | Circuit | Pole position | Fastest lap | Winning driver | Winning team |
|---|---|---|---|---|---|
| 1 | Vallelunga | (Switzerland) Franco Forini | (Italy) Alessandro Santin (Italy) Nino Famà (Italy) Walter Voulaz | (Italy) Walter Voulaz | Automotor |
| 2 | Mugello | (Italy) Alex Caffi | (Italy) Alessandro Santin | (Switzerland) Franco Forini | Venturini Racing |
| 3 | Misano | | (Italy) Nicola Carboni (Italy) Fabrizio Barbazza (Italy) Franco Scapini | (Italy) Alessandro Santin | Coloni |
| 4 | Mugello | (Italy) Alex Caffi | (Italy) Gianfranco Tacchino | (Italy) Alessandro Santin | Coloni |
| 5 | Monza | | (Italy) Alex Caffi (Italy) Luigi Giannini (Italy) Alex Caffi | (Italy) Alex Caffi | Euroteam |
| 6 | Magione | (Italy) Marco Apicella | (Italy) Marco Apicella (Italy) Nino Famà (Italy) Marco Apicella | (Italy) Franco Scapini | Automotor |
| 7 | Varano | (Italy) Marco Apicella | (Italy) Marco Apicella (Italy) Franco Scapini (Italy) Franco Scapini | (Italy) Franco Scapini | Automotor |
| 8 | Pergusa | (Italy) Alessandro Santin | (Italy) Alessandro Santin | (Italy) Alessandro Santin | Coloni |
| 9 | Varano | (Italy) Franco Scapini | (Italy) Franco Scapini (Italy) Mauro Apicella (Argentina) Juan Manuel Fangio II | (Italy) Alex Caffi | Eutoteam |
| 10 | Vallelunga | (Italy) Walter Voulaz | (Italy) Alex Caffi (Italy) Alessandro Santin (Italy) Alessandro Santin | (Italy) Alessandro Santin | Coloni |
| 11 | Imola | (Italy) Alex Caffi | (Italy) Alessandro Santin | (Switzerland) Franco Forini | Venturini Racing |
| 12 | Misano | (Italy) Alessandro Santin | (Italy) Alex Caffi (Italy) Marco Apicella (Italy) Ivan Capelli | (Italy) Gianfranco Tacchino | Prema Racing |

=== Championship standings ===
- Points are awarded as follows:

Sistema di punteggio
| Place | 1 | 2 | 3 | 4 | 5 | 6 |
|---|---|---|---|---|---|---|
| Points | 9 | 6 | 4 | 3 | 2 | 1 |

| Pos | Driver | VAL | MUG | MIS | MUG | MNZ | MAG | VAR | PER | VAR | VAL | IMO | MIS | Points |
|---|---|---|---|---|---|---|---|---|---|---|---|---|---|---|
| 1 | (Italy) Alessandro Santin | 4 | DSQ | 1 | 1 | 2 | Ret | Ret | **1** | DNQ | 1 | 4 | **3** | 52 |
| 2 | (Italy) Alex Caffi | Ret | **2** | 3 | **2** | 1 | DNQ | 2 | 11 | 1 | 2 | **Ret** | 7 | 46 |
| 3 | (Italy) Gianfranco Tacchino | 3 | 4 | 2 | 4 | 9 | 8 | 4 | 3 | 2 | Ret | 6 | 1 | 39 |
| 4 | (Italy) Franco Scapini | 8 | | 6 | 16 | 5 | 1 | 1 | 2 | **4** | Ret | 3 | Ret | 34 |
| 5 | (Switzerland) Franco Forini | DNQ | 1 | 4 | Ret | 8 | Ret | 3 | DSQ | 10 | 6 | 1 | 6 | 27 |
| 6 | (Italy) Fabrizio Barbazza | Ret | 3 | 5 | 6 | 3 | 4 | Ret | DSQ | DSQ | DNQ | 2 | 5 | 22 |
| 7 | (Italy) Marco Apicella | DNQ | Ret | Ret | 3 | Ret | **2** | **Ret** | 6 | Ret | 3 | 5 | 18 | 17 |
| 8 | (Italy) Walter Voulaz | 1 | Ret | | | | | | | Ret | **4** | Ret | | 12 |
| 9 | (Italy) Nino Famà | 2 | 5 | Ret | Ret | 10 | 6 | 5 | | | Ret | | | 11 |
| 10 | (Italy) Fabio Mancini | 5 | DSQ | 11 | 5 | DNQ | 3 | 9 | | 6 | Ret | Ret | 12 | 9 |
| 11 | (Italy) Luigi Giannini | 15 | Ret | 10 | 8 | 6 | DNQ | 6 | | 3 | 5 | | 14 | 8 |
| 12 | (Italy) Ivan Capelli | | | | | | | | | | | | 2 | 6 |
| 13 | (Italy) Claudio Antonioli | Ret | 9 | 12 | 10 | 23 | DNQ | 12 | 4 | DNQ | 10 | 7 | DNQ | 3 |
| 14 | (Italy) Fernando Cazzaniga | | | | | 4 | | | | | | | | 3 |
| 14 | (Italy) Nicola Larini | | | | | | | | | | | | 4 | 3 |
| 16 | (Italy) Danilo Frassoni | | | | 11 | 12 | 5 | 7 | Ret | DNQ | Ret | 16 | 13 | 2 |
| 17 | (United States) Joe Sulentic | | 17 | 16 | 19 | DNQ | DNQ | DNQ | 5 | 9 | 11 | 9 | 21 | 2 |
| 18 | (Argentina) Juan Manuel Fangio II | | | | | | | 8 | | 5 | | Ret | | 2 |
| 19 | (Italy) Giacomo Vismara | 6 | 6 | 7 | 17 | DNQ | Ret | DNQ | | | | | | 2 |
| 20 | (Italy) Maurizio Manfredi | | 7 | 20 | 18 | 7 | 9 | Ret | | DNQ | Ret | | | 0 |
| 21 | (Italy) Marco Melito | 13 | 8 | 9 | 7 | 18 | DNQ | 11 | | 8 | Ret | 15 | 17 | 0 |
| 22 | (Peru) Ernesto Jochamowitz | 12 | 15 | 19 | 13 | 19 | DNQ | DNQ | 9 | 7 | 9 | 8 | 10 | 0 |
| 23 | (Italy) Giorgio Montaldo | Ret | 12 | | | DNQ | | | | | 7 | 10 | 9 | 0 |
| 24 | (Italy) Stefano Livio | 7 | | | | 13 | | | | | | | | 0 |
| 25 | (Italy) Amedeo Marcotulli | DNQ | | 14 | | | 7 | | | | | | | 0 |
| 26 | (Italy) Paolo Urioni | | | | | | | | 7 | | | | | 0 |
| 27 | (Italy) Nicola Carboni | | 14 | 8 | Ret | | | | | | | | | 0 |
| 28 | (Italy) Luigi Moreschi | | | | | | | | 8 | | | | | 0 |
| 28 | (Italy) Stefano Nisini | | | | | | | | | | 8 | | | 0 |
| 28 | (Spain) Luis Pérez-Sala | | | | | | | | | | | | 8 | 0 |
| 31 | (Italy) Rodolfo Manni | 9 | 11 | | | | | | | DNQ | 11 | NP | | 0 |
| 32 | (Italy) Rocco Verduci | 11 | 10 | 21 | Ret | Ret | Ret | 13 | | DNQ | 13 | 12 | 19 | 0 |
| 33 | (Italy) Gabriele Tarquini | Ret | | Ret | 12 | 15 | Ret | 10 | | 11 | Ret | | | 0 |
| 34 | (Italy) "Asteldo" | 10 | Ret | | Ret | 11 | Ret | DNQ | | | | | | 0 |
| 35 | (Italy) Nicola Marozzo | Ret | | | | 20 | Ret | Ret | 10 | 12 | Ret | | 15 | 0 |
| 36 | (Italy) Enrico Bertaggia | DNQ | 20 | 18 | | 16 | | | | Ret | Ret | 11 | DNQ | 0 |
| 37 | (Italy) Roberto Lanzetti | | | | | | | | | | | | 11 | 0 |
| 38 | (Italy) Luca Melgrati | DNQ | 18 | 13 | Ret | 14 | DNQ | | | Ret | | | | 0 |
| 39 | (Italy) Giovanna Amati | DNQ | 13 | | Ret | 21 | | DNQ | | Ret | Ret | Ret | 16 | 0 |
| 40 | (Italy) Luca Moretti | | | | | | | | | | | 13 | | 0 |
| 41 | (Italy) Giuseppe Arlotti | | 19 | 15 | 14 | DNQ | | | | | | | | 0 |
| 42 | (Italy) "Ludwig" | 14 | 16 | | 22 | | | | | | | | | 0 |
| 43 | (Italy) Gerardo Vatielli | | | | | | | | | | Ret | 14 | | 0 |
| 44 | (Italy) Aldo Venzi | | | 15 | | | | | | | | | | 0 |
| 45 | (Italy) Giovanni Lavaggi | | | | | | | | | | | 17 | 23 | 0 |
| 46 | (Italy) Alfredo Merelli | | | | | 17 | | | | | | | | 0 |
| 47 | (Italy) Nicola Tesini | | | | | | | | | | | | 20 | 0 |
| 48 | (Italy) Carlo Betti | | 21 | | | | | | | | | | | 0 |
| 49 | (Italy) Ermanno Alboreto | | | | | | | | | | | | 22 | 0 |
| 50 | (Italy) Antonio Giglio | | | | | 24 | | | | | | | | 0 |
| 51 | (Italy) Giorgio Vergani | | | | | 25 | | | | | | | DNQ | 0 |
| | (Italy) Antonio Padrone | Ret | | | | | | | | DNQ | Ret | | | - |
| | (Italy) Ernesto Catella | DNQ | Ret | | | | | | | | | | | - |
| | (South Africa) Nicolò Bianco | DNQ | Ret | DNQ | Ret | | DNQ | | | | | | | - |
| | (Italy) Bruno Corradi | | Ret | | | | | | | | | | | - |
| | (Italy) "Pupa" | | | Ret | WD | DNQ | DNQ | | | | | | | - |
| | (Italy) Marino Mura | | | | Ret | | | | | | | | | - |
| | (Italy) Giovanni Bertaccini | | | | Ret | DNQ | | | | | | DNQ | | - |
| | (Italy) Paolo Giangrossi | | | | | | | | | | Ret | Ret | DNQ | - |
| | (Italy) Sergio Morzani | | | | | | | | | | Ret | | | - |
| | (Italy) Roberto Frangapane | | | | | | | | | | Ret | | | - |
| | (Italy) Accardi | | | | | | | | | | Ret | | | - |
| | (Italy) Arturo Merzario | | WD | | | | | | | | | | | - |
| | (Italy) Guarino | | | | | | | | WD | | | | | - |
| | (Italy) Pierluigi Massa | DNQ | | | | | | | | | | | | - |
| | (Italy) Pasquale Barberio | DNQ | | | | | | | | | | | | - |
| | (Italy) Marino Mantovani | | | DNQ | | | | DNQ | | DNQ | | | | - |
| | (Italy) Gianni Fusetti | | | DNQ | | DNQ | | | | | | | | - |
| | (Italy) Mezzini | | | DNQ | | | | | | | | | | - |
| | (Italy) Alfredo Sebastiani | | | DNQ | | DNQ | | | | | | | | - |
| | (Italy) Marco Brand | | | | | DNQ | | | | | | | | - |
| | (Italy) Giovanni Fossati | | | | | DNQ | | DNQ | | DNQ | | | | - |
| | (Italy) Amadori | | | | | | | | | DNQ | | | | - |
| | (Italy) Mario Gatta | | | | | | | | | DNQ | | | | - |
| | (Italy) Luca Maggiorelli | | | | | | | | | | | | DNQ | - |
| | (Italy) Andrea Verna | | | | | | | | | | | | DNQ | - |
| | (Italy) Carlini | | | | | | | | | | | | DNQ | - |
| | (Italy) Ferdinando Romero | | | | | | | | | | | | DNQ | - |
| Pos | Driver | VAL | MUG | MIS | MUG | MNZ | MAG | VAR | PER | VAR | VAL | IMO | MIS | Points |

| Colour | Result |
|---|---|
| Gold | Winner |
| Silver | Second place |
| Bronze | Third place |
| Green | Points classification |
| Blue | Non-points classification |
| Blue | Non-classified finish (NC) |
| Purple | Retired, not classified (Ret) |
| Red | Did not qualify (DNQ) |
| Red | Did not pre-qualify (DNPQ) |
| Black | Disqualified (DSQ) |
| White | Did not start (DNS) |
| White | Withdrew (WD) |
| White | Race cancelled (C) |
| Blank | Did not practice (DNP) |
| Blank | Did not arrive (DNA) |
| Blank | Excluded (EX) |

**Bold** – Pole
Italics – Fastest Lap
