= Formula One Indoor Trophy =

Non-championship sprint race at Bologna

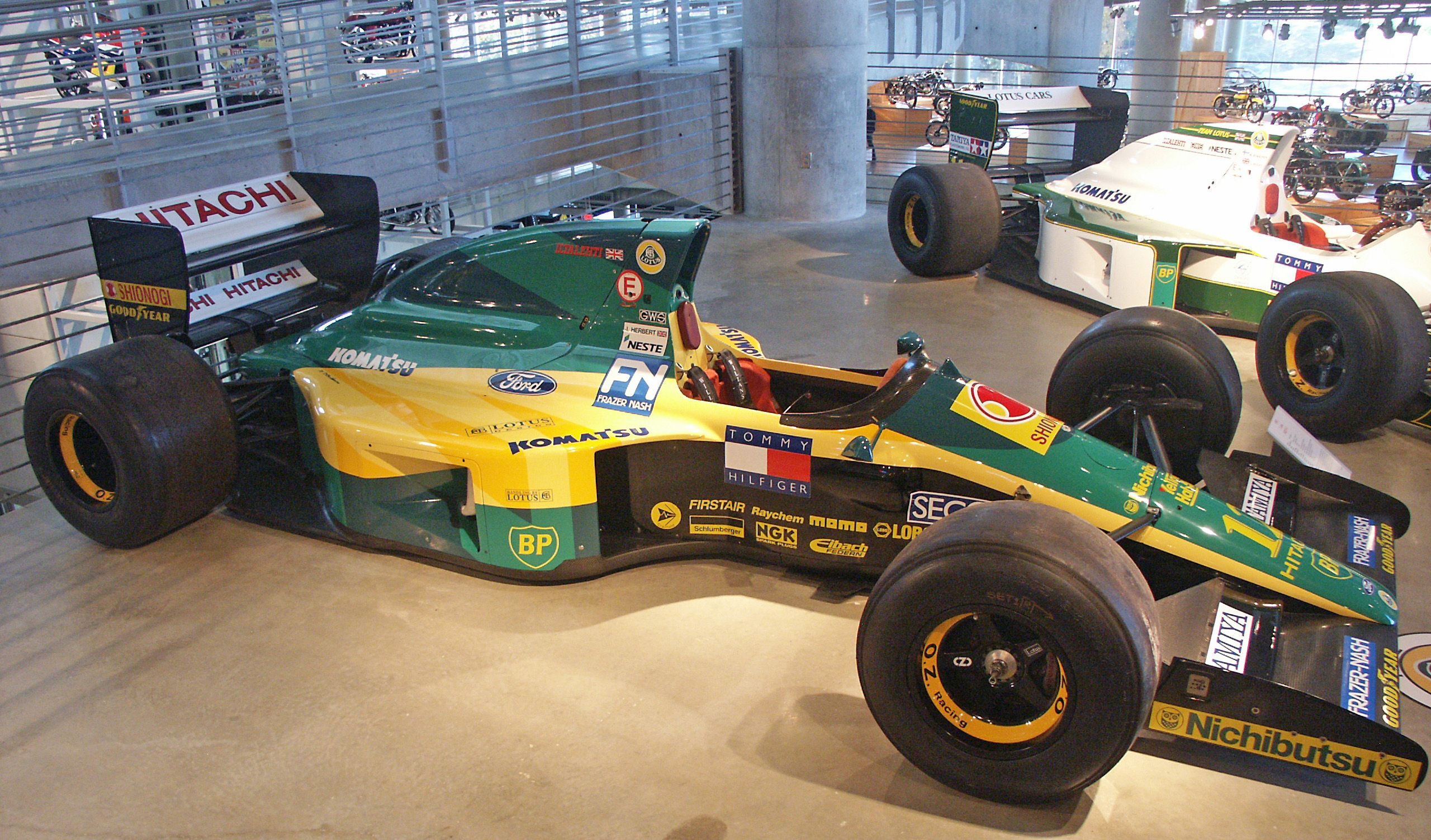
- The Lotus 102D used by Johnny Herbert in the 1992 event
- Category: Formula One
- Country: Italy
- Inaugural season: 1988
- Folded: 1996
- Drivers: 6 (1996)
- Teams: 3 (1996)
- Constructors: 3 (1996)
- Last Drivers' champion: (Italy) Giancarlo Fisichella
- Last Teams' champion: (Italy) Benetton

The Formula One Indoor Trophy or Trofeo Indoor Formula One was a non-championship Formula One sprint held every year at the Bologna Motor Show between 1988 and 1996 (except for 1994 when it was not held).

Despite having Indoor in the name of the race, the race was staged outside in a parking lot outside of the arena that hosted the show. The first race was won by Luis Pérez-Sala. The last running of the event was the last non-championship Formula One competition and was won by Giancarlo Fisichella in a Benetton-Renault; the event switched to using Formula 3000 machinery from 1997 onwards; the event was rebranded Bologna Motor Show F3000 Sprint as a result.

== Winners of the Indoor Trophy ==
Year	Preliminary Round Winner	Final Winner	Constructor	Report
1988	(Italy) Alex Caffi	(Spain) Luis Pérez-Sala	Minardi-Ford	Report
1989	(Italy) Andrea De Cesaris	(Spain) Luis Pérez-Sala	Minardi-Ford	Report
1990	not held	(Italy) Gianni Morbidelli	Minardi-Ford	Report
1991	not held	(Italy) Gabriele Tarquini	Fondmetal-Ford	Report
1992	not held	(United Kingdom) Johnny Herbert	Lotus-Judd	Report
1993	(Brazil) Rubens Barrichello	(Brazil) Rubens Barrichello	Jordan-Hart	Report
1994	not held			
1995	(Italy) Giancarlo Fisichella	(Italy) Luca Badoer	Minardi-Ford	Report
1996	(Italy) Jarno Trulli	(Italy) Giancarlo Fisichella	Benetton-Renault	Report

=== Bologna Motorshow F3000 Sprint winners ===
Year	Driver	Team
1997	(Austria) Oliver Tichy	(Italy) Coloni Motorsport
1998	(Italy) Fabrizio Gollin	(Italy) G. S. International
1999	(Italy) Marco Apicella	Monaco Motorsport
1999	(Italy) Thomas Biagi	(Italy) GP Racing
2000	(Brazil) Ricardo Sperafico	(Italy) ADM Competition
2001	(Italy) Thomas Biagi	(Italy) Fortec Italia Motorsport
2002	(Germany) André Lotterer	(Italy) Uboldi Corse
2003	(Italy) Matteo Grassotto	(Italy) ADM Motorsport
2004	(Italy) Marco Bonanomi	(Italy) Coloni Motorsport
2004	(Italy) Gabriele Lancieri	(Italy) ADM Motorsport
2005	(Italy) Marco Bonanomi	(Italy) Fisichella Motorsport
2006	(Italy) Gabriele Lancieri	(Italy) Avelon Formula
2007	(France) Pierre Ragues	(Italy) Auto Sport Racing
