= 1990 Formula One Indoor Trophy =

Seasons
- ← 1989 1991 →

The 1990 Formula One Indoor Trophy took place on December 8–9 at the Bologna Motor Show. The winner was Gianni Morbidelli in a Minardi-Ford.

== Participants ==
The participation for the third Formula One Indoor Trophy shrank to a record low of 5, representing five different teams.

The competition came at the end of the 1990 season, and Pedro Chaves, who had signed for Coloni for 1991 but not driven for them in 1990 represented them in it. Coloni chose him over Bertrand Gachot, who had represented them in season. Osella, on the other hand, were represented by their regular driver Olivier Grouillard.

BMS Scuderia Italia sent JJ Lehto, who had signed for them for 1991 but had driven for Onyx in 1990. The team, which used Dallara chassis, chose not to use its 1990 drivers Emanuele Pirro and Andrea de Cesaris.

Minardi, whose driver Luis Pérez-Sala had won both the previous Indoor Trophies, sent Gianni Morbidelli. The Italian had raced for them in the last two races of 1990, replacing Paolo Barilla, and would race for them again in 1991.

Finally, EuroBrun were represented by Domenico Schiattarella, who would not make his full F1 debut for another three and a half years, instead of their regular drivers Roberto Moreno and Claudio Langes.

Driver	Team
(Portugal) Pedro Chaves	Coloni-Ford
(France) Olivier Grouillard	Osella-Ford
(Finland) JJ Lehto	BMS Dallara-Ford
(Italy) Gianni Morbidelli	Minardi-Ford
(Italy) Domenico Schiattarella	EuroBrun-Judd

== Results ==
Chaves was given a bye to the semi-finals, while the two Italians, Morbidelli and Schiattarella drawn against each other, and the same with the two remaining foreigners, Lehto and Grouillard. Morbidelli and Grouillard both won, the Italian's being the far less surprising result. As the closest loser, Lehto also went through to the semis.

He raced Morbidelli in the semis, and lost again, as did Chaves against Grouillard. This set up a final between Morbidelli and Grouillard, and the Italian took victory to give Minardi three consecutive victories in the trophy.

Quarter-finals
(Italy)	Gianni Morbidelli
(Italy)	Domenico Schiattarella
(Finland)	JJ Lehto
(France)	Olivier Grouillard

Semi-finals
(Italy)	Gianni Morbidelli
(Finland)	JJ Lehto
(Portugal)	Pedro Chaves
(France)	Olivier Grouillard

Final
(Italy)	Gianni Morbidelli
(France)	Olivier Grouillard
