= 1989 Formula One Indoor Trophy =

Seasons
- ← 1988 1990 →

The 1989 Formula One Indoor Trophy took place on December 2–3 at the Bologna Motor Show. The winner was Luis Pérez-Sala in a Minardi-Ford.

== Participants ==
Participation for the second Formula One Indoor Trophy increased from six to seven drivers. Coming at the end of the 1989 Formula One season, it featured five teams.

Osella entered a two-man team, but neither of their regular drivers, Nicola Larini and Piercarlo Ghinzani, drove. Coloni driver Enrico Bertaggia and Swiss driver Andrea Chiesa, who was driving for Roni Motorsport in International Formula 3000 at the time, where their chosen competitors.

BMS Scuderia Italia sent along Andrea de Cesaris with one of their Dallara cars. Their other driver, Alex Caffi, did not attend.

Minardi also sent two drivers, defending champion Luis Pérez-Sala and Pierluigi Martini. Pierre-Henri Raphanel attended for Coloni, although he had been replaced mid season by Bertaggia, who had been poached for this event by Osella.

Finally, EuroBrun was represented by Claudio Langes, who had signed for the team for 1990, replaced Gregor Foitek and Oscar Larrauri who had driven in 1989.

Driver	Team
(Italy) Enrico Bertaggia	Osella-Ford
(Switzerland) Andrea Chiesa	Osella-Ford
(Italy) Andrea de Cesaris	BMS Dallara-Ford
(Italy) Claudio Langes	EuroBrun-Judd
(Italy) Pierluigi Martini	Minardi-Ford
(Spain) Luis Pérez-Sala	Minardi-Ford
(France) Pierre Henri Raphanel	Coloni-Ford

== Results ==
De Cesaris was given a bye through the quarter-finals. Meanwhile, defending champion Pérez-Sala was drawn against Raphanel, Bertaggia against Langes and Martini against Chiesa. Unsurprisingly, the more experienced Pérez-Sala, Bertaggia and Martini went through to the semi-finals.

De Cesaris would face Pérez-Sala in the first semi-final in a hard to predict match up, which the Spaniard won. His team mate Pierluigi Martini also won through against Enrico Bertaggia, to create an all-Minardi final. Pérez-Sala won the final to take the title for the second year running.

Preliminary Rounds

Pos	Driver	Constructor	Time	Gap
1	(Italy) Andrea De Cesaris	(Italy) Dallara-Ford Cosworth	52"15	
2	(Italy) Pierluigi Martini	(Italy) Minardi-Ford Cosworth	52"30	+ 0"15
3	(Spain) Luis Pérez-Sala	(Italy) Minardi-Ford Cosworth	52"72	+ 0"57
4	(Italy) Enrico Bertaggia	(Italy) Osella-Ford Cosworth	53"63	+ 1"48
5	(Italy) Claudio Langes	(Italy) EuroBrun-Judd	54"03	+ 1"88
6	(Switzerland) Andrea Chiesa	(Italy) Osella-Ford Cosworth	54"14	+ 1"99
7	(France) Pierre Henri Raphanel	(Italy) Coloni-Ford Cosworth	-	

Quarter-finals
(Spain)	Luis Pérez-Sala
(France)	Pierre Henri Raphanel
(Italy)	Enrico Bertaggia
(Italy)	Claudio Langes
(Italy)	Pierluigi Martini
(Switzerland)	Andrea Chiesa

Semi-finals
(Italy)	Andrea de Cesaris
(Spain)	Luis Pérez-Sala
(Italy)	Enrico Bertaggia
(Italy)	Pierluigi Martini

Final
(Spain)	Luis Pérez-Sala
(Italy)	Pierluigi Martini
