= 1991 Formula One Indoor Trophy =

Seasons
- ← 1990 1992 →

The 1991 Formula One Indoor Trophy took place on December 7–8 at the Bologna Motor Show. The winner was Gabriele Tarquini in a Fondmetal-Ford.

== Participants ==
For the fourth Formula One Indoor Trophy, the participation rose again to six. Lotus became the first non-Italian team to enter, and they were represented by Johnny Herbert, who had alternated in their second car during the season with Michael Bartels after they replaced Julian Bailey early in the season. Herbert would drive for the team permanently in 1992.

Fondmetal entered the competition for the first time, with Gabriele Tarquini driving the car. The Italian had seen out the last three races of the season for the team, after replacing Olivier Grouillard. He would also drive for his team permanently in 1992.

BMS Scuderia Italia, still using Dallara chassis, were represented for a second year by JJ Lehto, who had driven in 1991 alongside Emanuele Pirro. Three time champions Minardi had two cars, one driven by defending champion Gianni Morbidelli, even though he had been replaced by Roberto Moreno during the season, the other a 1990 spec car driven by test driver Marco Apicella. Apicella's car was using a Ford engine, as opposed to the Ferrari motor in Morbidelli's car.

Finally, Coloni were represented by test driver Antonio Tamburini, who would never enter a Grand Prix. He was chosen over regular drivers Pedro Chaves and Naoki Hattori.

Driver	Team
(Italy) Marco Apicella	Minardi-Ford
(United Kingdom) Johnny Herbert	Lotus-Judd
(Finland) JJ Lehto	BMS Dallara-Judd
(Italy) Gianni Morbidelli	Minardi-Ferrari
(Italy) Antonio Tamburini	Coloni-Ford
(Italy) Gabriele Tarquini	Fondmetal-Ford

== Results ==
Herbert was drawn against Tarquini in the quarter-finals, while Lehto was drawn against Apicella and Morbidelli against Tamburini. Herbert was, surprisingly, defeated by Tarquini, while Lehto defeated Apicella, less surprisingly as the Italian was driving an outdated car. Another surprise saw the inexperienced Antonio Tamburini defeat defending champion Gianni Morbidelli. As the closest loser, Johnny Herbert also progressed to the semi-finals.

He was drawn against Tamburini, and won, while the other semi final saw Tarquini eliminate Lehto. The final was then a rematch of the quarter-final matchup between Herbert and Tarquini, and the Italian won again, meaning that he was the first driver to win the tournament in a car other than a Minardi.

Quarter-finals
(United Kingdom)	Johnny Herbert
(Italy)	Gabriele Tarquini
(Finland)	JJ Lehto
(Italy)	Marco Apicella
(Italy)	Gianni Morbidelli
(Italy)	Antonio Tamburini

Semi-finals
(Italy)	Gabriele Tarquini
(Finland)	JJ Lehto
(Italy)	Antonio Tamburini
(United Kingdom)	Johnny Herbert

Final
(Italy)	Gabriele Tarquini
(United Kingdom)	Johnny Herbert
