= Gabriele Tarquini =

Italian racing driver (born 1962)

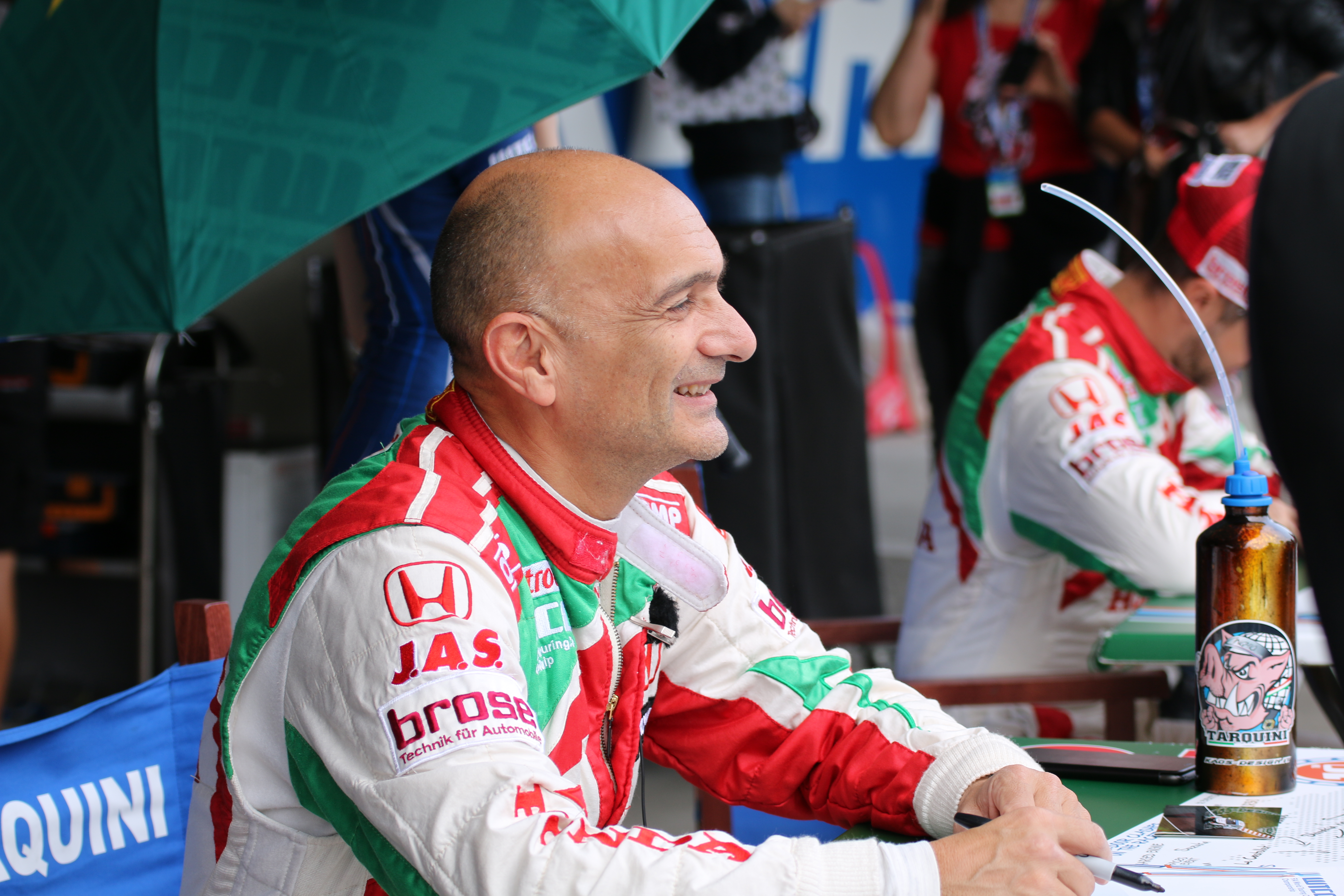
- Tarquini in 2014
- Born: 2 March 1962 (age 64); Giulianova, Abruzzo, Italy

WTCC / WTCR career
- Years active: 1987, 2005–2021 (Note: The premier FIA championship for touring car racing was operated as the World Touring Car Championship between 1987 and 2017, and the World Touring Car Cup from 2018 to 2022.)
- Teams: Alfa Romeo, SEAT, Sunred, Lukoil, Honda, Lada, BRC
- Starts: 269
- Championships: 2 (2009, 2018)
- Wins: 30
- Podiums: 91
- Poles: 20
- Fastest laps: 32

Formula One World Championship career
- Nationality: (Italy) Italian
- Active years: 1987–1992, 1995
- Team(s): Osella, Coloni, First, AGS, Fondmetal, Tyrrell
- Entries: 78 (38 starts)
- Championships: 0
- Wins: 0
- Podiums: 0
- Career points: 1
- Pole positions: 0
- Fastest laps: 0
- First entry: 1987 San Marino Grand Prix
- Last entry: 1995 European Grand Prix

Previous series
- 2000–2004; 1989–2002 (Note: The exact years Tarquini competed in the Italian Superturismo Championship: 1989–1990, 1992–1993, 1995, 2002.); 1994–2000 (Note: The exact years Tarquini competed in the British Touring Car Championship: 1994–1995, 1997, 1999–2000.); 1998–1999; 1995–1996; 1985–1987; 1983–1984: ETCC; Italian Superturismo; BTCC; STW; ITC; International F3000; Italian F3

Championship titles
- 2003; 1994; 1991: ETCC; BTCC; F1 Indoor Trophy

Gabriele Tarquini (born 2 March 1962) is an Italian former racing driver and motorsport executive who competed in Formula One between 1987 and 1995, (Note: The exact years Tarquini competed in Formula One: 1987–1992, 1995.) and World Touring Car from 2005 to 2021. In touring car racing, Tarquini won the World Touring Car Championship in 2009 with SEAT; he also won the British Touring Car Championship in 1994, the European Touring Car Championship in 2003, and the World Touring Car Cup in 2018.

Born in Giulianova, Tarquini began competitive kart racing aged 14. He participated in 78 Formula One Grands Prix, debuting at the 1987 San Marino Grand Prix. Across seven seasons, he competed for Osella, Coloni, First, AGS, Fondmetal, and Tyrrell. He scored a single championship point at the 1989 Mexican Grand Prix, and holds the record for the most failed attempts to qualify (40).

Tarquini subsequently competed in touring cars, winning the 1994 British Touring Car Championship with Alfa Romeo, and the 2003 European Touring Car Championship with Nordauto. By winning the 2009 World Touring Car Championship with SEAT, he became the oldest FIA World Champion, aged 47 years and 266 days. He later won the 2018 World Touring Car Cup with BRC, aged 56. He has served as sporting director for Genesis Magma Racing in the FIA World Endurance Championship since 2026.

== Formula One ==
Tarquini began karting in 1976. By 1985 he was driving in Formula 3000, spending three seasons with underfunded outfits. His best result was second at Imola in 1987, by which time he had already made his Grand Prix debut in a one-off drive for Osella at the 1987 San Marino Grand Prix.

Tarquini joined Coloni's Grand Prix team for 1988, having driven for them in F3000 in 1986. The season saw a prequalifying system being put in place as there were 31 entrants for a maximum 30 places in qualifying proper. As such, the slowest of the new entrants for the season (Coloni, Rial, Dallara and EuroBrun) would be eliminated from proceedings after the Friday morning session regardless of their overall position - Tarquini failed to prequalify several times despite often being faster than some of the exempt entrants (such as the Osella and Zakspeed cars). He drew good notices for his performance overall, however - his eighth place at the Canadian Grand Prix would stand as the team's best ever result and his eight starts the most ever garnered by a Coloni driver.

Tarquini signed to drive for the FIRST team (again a former employer in F3000) and drove for them at the Formula One Indoor Trophy, but when their car failed crash tests he started 1989 without a ride. Following Philippe Streiff's career-ending pre-season testing crash, Tarquini joined Joachim Winkelhock in the AGS team from the second round of the series. There he finished a fine eighth on the road, being promoted to sixth after the exclusion of Thierry Boutsen and Alex Caffi. He was then one of the stars of the weekend in Monaco, threatening to qualify in the top-six before ending up 13th on the grid. In the race he advanced to a strong fourth before being sidelined by an electrical problem. At the following Mexican Grand Prix, he finished sixth, though the team's joy was tempered after Williams and Scuderia Italia successfully appealed against their Imola disqualification and Tarquini lost his point. More bad luck followed at Phoenix, where Tarquini was holding sixth despite technical problems before Boutsen passed him on the final lap. At the wet Canadian Grand Prix Tarquini again ran well until being shoved off the track by René Arnoux (who eventually went on to finish fifth). The series then moved to faster tracks where the AGS was less competitive and the results of others meant Tarquini's entry (exempt for the first half of the season thanks to Streiff's efforts in 1988) would have to prequalify for the second half of the season.

The expanding entry list meant prequalifying was very different from 1988, consisting of an hour-long free-for-all session on Friday morning between the less successful cars. Featuring the Larrousse cars of Michele Alboreto and Philippe Alliot, Roberto Moreno's Coloni, the Osellas of Nicola Larini and Piercarlo Ghinzani and the Onyx cars of Stefan Johansson and Bertrand Gachot among others with only the four fastest going through both Tarquini and new teammate Yannick Dalmas struggled and Tarquini would not qualify again that year.

AGS attempted to move to larger premises for 1990 but a lack of resources and the late arrival of the JH25 left Tarquini and Dalmas again struggling to get past prequalifying, Tarquini only making it into four races (finishing just once - 13th in the Hungarian Grand Prix), his early 1989 form long forgotten by most. The team were under even more severe financial constraints for 1991, though they would initially at least avoid prequalifying. Tarquini made it through into three races, finishing a worthy eighth in the season opener at Phoenix but financial constraints meant after Monaco the AGS didn't make the grid again.

Late in the season, the cash-strapped team sold his contract to Gabriele Rumi's ambitious Fondmetal outfit in time for the Spanish Grand Prix, soon forming a good relationship with the team. He was signed for a full year in 1992, showing some good speed in the neat but underdeveloped Fondmetal GR02 chassis. However, his car only finished once (14th at Silverstone, hindered by clutch problems) and despite some fine qualifying efforts (including outqualifying Ivan Capelli's Ferrari in Belgium) the team struggled to find funding, folding after the following Italian Grand Prix and leaving Tarquini out of a drive.

Despite being firmly involved in his successful touring cars career and 33 years old, Tarquini was signed up by Tyrrell for the 1995 season as their test driver thanks to the presence of Fondmetal as a sponsor. He replaced Ukyo Katayama for the European round as the Japanese driver was injured from his start line accident in the previous race. Out of practice with single seaters (having done very little actual testing due to the team's financial constraints) he finished 14th, six laps down on winner Michael Schumacher. It was his final Grand Prix, and to date, the last occasion a reigning BTCC Champion has competed in Formula One.

Tarquini failed to pre-qualify on a record 25 occasions (out of a total of 40 failures to qualify), mainly because he was a regular in the pre-qualifying era, usually in cars which were so slow as to struggle to qualify. Despite this record many consider him to have been a talented driver stuck with uncompetitive machinery (much like contemporary Roberto Moreno).

== Touring Cars ==
=== Italian Superturismo 1993 ===
==== Alfa Romeo (1993) ====
With the adaption of the Super Touring regulations dominated by D-segment cars in 1993, Tarquini joined Alfa Romeo, becoming their number one driver and finishing third in Italian Superturismo behind Roberto Ravaglia and Fabrizio Giovanardi.

=== BTCC 1994/1995 ===
==== Alfa Romeo (1994–1995) ====
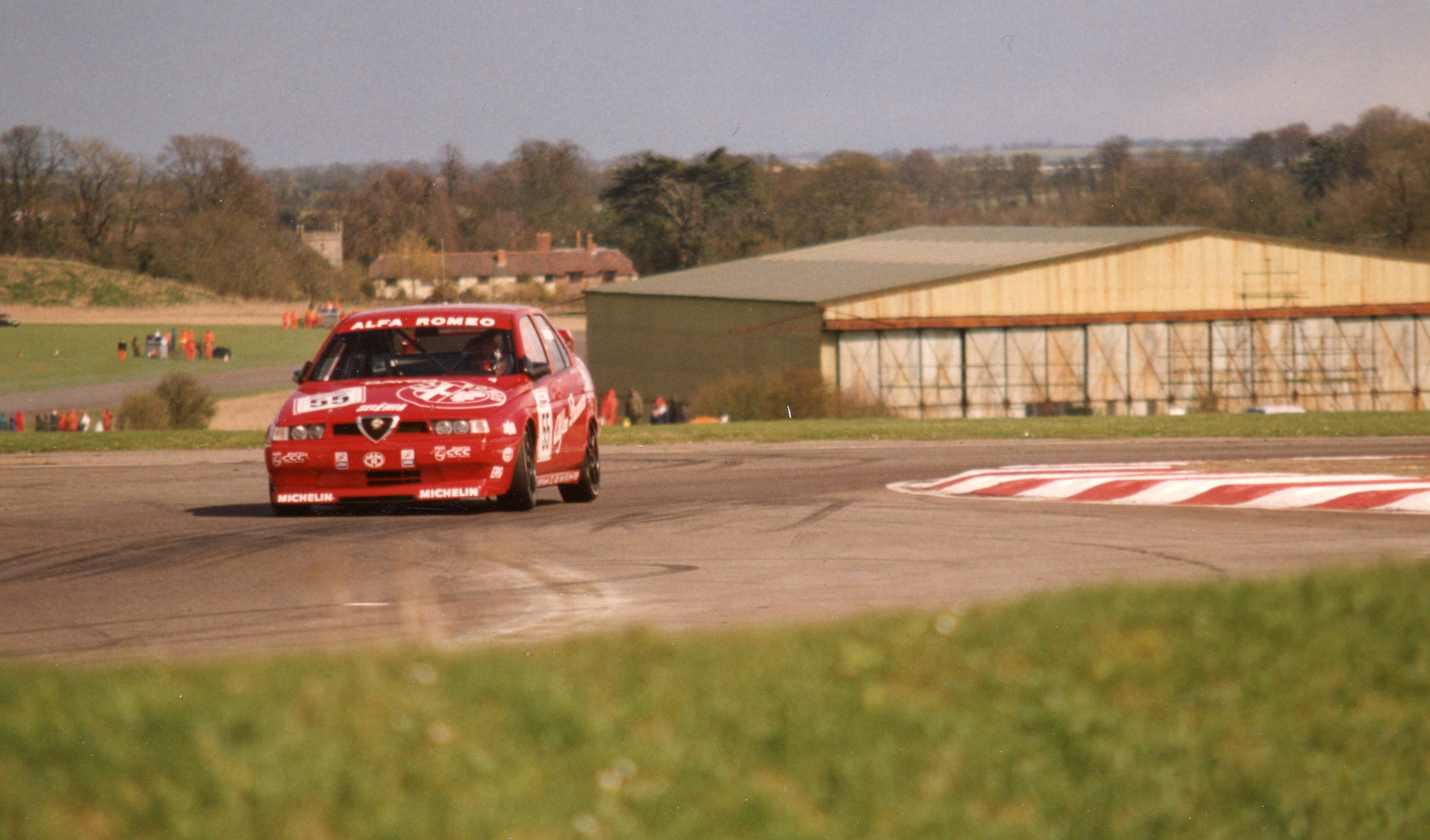
Tarquini driving for Alfa Romeo at Thruxton during the 1994 British Touring Car Championship.

The following year, Tarquini moved to the British Touring Car Championship, winning the title at his first attempt in an Alfa Romeo featuring controversial aerodynamic enhancements. In 1995, Alfa Corse decided to move him back to Italian Superturismo Championship but after two victories, four third places and six DNF's, Tarquini left the series and joined to Prodrive to help Alfa Romeo to achieve better results in BTCC.

=== ITC 1996 ===
==== Alfa Romeo (1996) ====
In 1996, Tarquini raced in Class 1 Touring Cars with Alfa Romeo in ITC, where he achieved best results of one victory and one second place.

=== BTCC 1997 ===
==== Honda (1997) ====
With the end of D1 Class, Tarquini left Alfa Romeo and signed a five-year contract with Honda where he raced in BTCC again with Prodrive. The first season with Honda saw him finishing sixth in the general standings with one victory, one second and three third places.

=== STW 1998/1999 ===
==== Honda (1998–1999) ====
In 1998 and 1999, Tarquini raced in Germany with JAS Motorsport in STW Cup where he got two victories and several podiums.

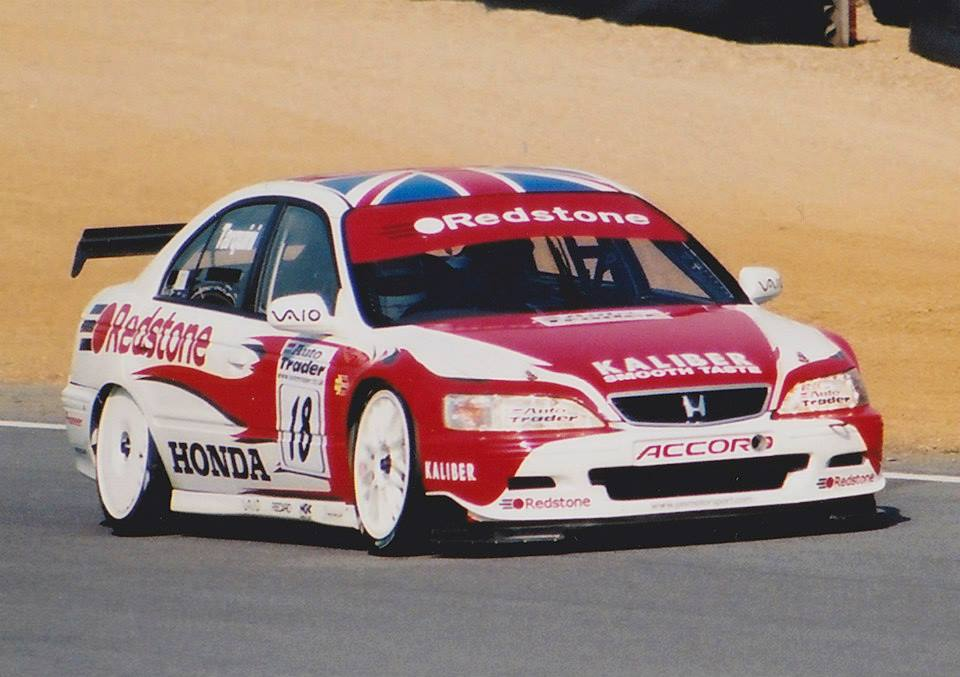
Tarquini driving for Honda at Brands Hatch during the 2000 British Touring Car Championship season.

=== BTCC 2000 ===
==== Honda (2000) ====
After two years in Germany, Tarquini raced for the third time in BTCC.

=== Euro STC 2001 ===
==== Honda (2001) ====
In his last season with Honda, Tarquini raced in Euro STC, where he finished third behind the 2 Alfa Romeo of Giovanardi and Larini, although he got nine victories.

=== ETCC 2003/2004 ===
After spending 2002 without a car, in 2003, Tarquini came back to Alfa Romeo where he raced in the ETCC and he won the title at the first attempt as it happened nine years before in BTCC. In 2004 for the last season of ETCC, he was again the best of Alfa's driver, and he finished third behind the two BMW's of Priaulx and Dirk Muller.

=== WTCC ===
==== Alfa Romeo (2005) ====
Tarquini remained with Alfa Romeo as the ETCC became the World Touring Car Championship (WTCC) in 2005. He finished seventh overall, with two victories.

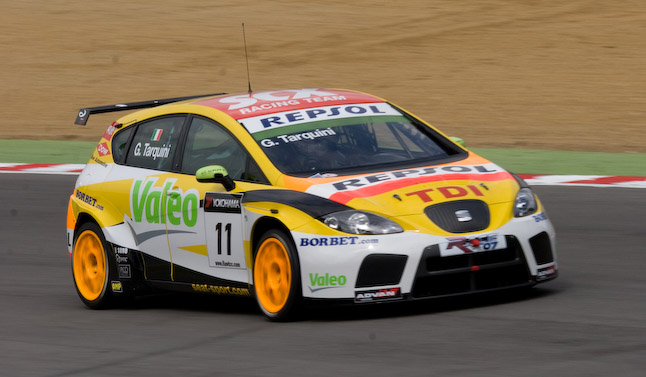
Tarquini driving the SEAT Léon at Brands Hatch in the 2008 WTCC season.

==== SEAT Sport (2006–2009) ====
In November 2005, Tarquini was confirmed as one of six drivers at SEAT Sport for 2006. He finished fifth in the championship that year with one win. He finished eighth in the standings in 2007, once again winning just one race. 2008 saw considerable improvement for Tarquini as he finished runner-up in the championship to Yvan Muller winning three races. His biggest success of his career came in 2009, when he won the WTCC championship at the last race of the year in Macau.

==== Sunred (2010–2011) ====
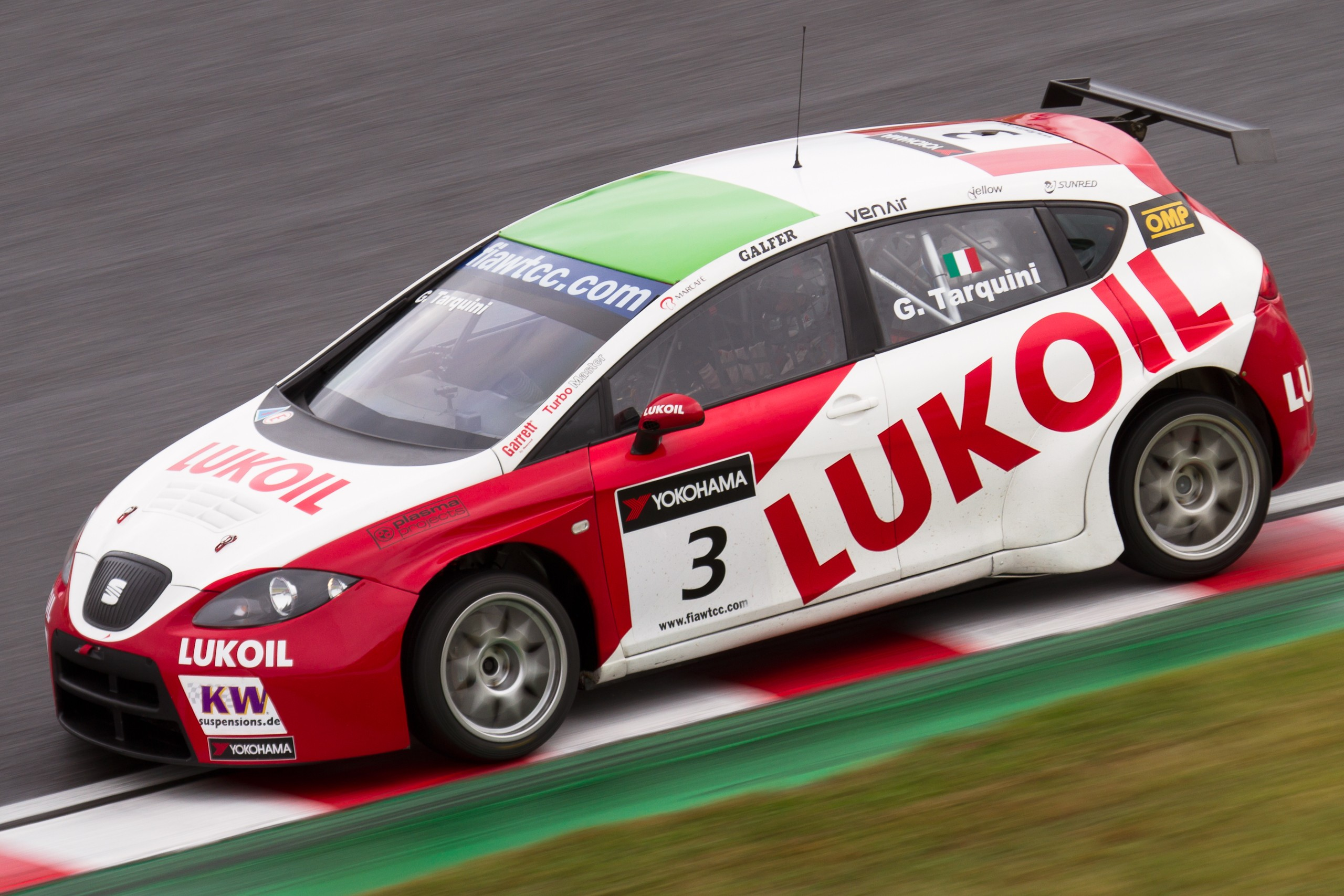
Tarquini driving for Lukoil-SUNRED at Suzuka in the 2011 WTCC season.

SEAT withdrew from the WTCC for 2010, but provided funding to introduce the new semi-works SR-Sport team, with whom Tarquini attempted to retain his crown. He scored five wins during the season to finish runner-up to ex-SEAT Sport teammate Yvan Muller in the drivers standings. This was after four victories, plus an inherited victory in Belgium from Jordi Gene after Gene's disqualification. His crash in Japan race two ended his title hopes.

In 2011, Tarquini drove for the Lukoil-SUNRED team alongside Aleksei Dudukalo. He started the year with the SEAT 2.0 TDI engine but switched to the SUNRED 1.6T for Brno onwards. He finished the season fifth in the standings with just one win in a year dominated by the Chevrolet RML team.

==== Lukoil Racing (2012) ====
In January 2012, it was confirmed that Tarquini would drive for Lukoil Racing in a SEAT León powered by the new SEAT Sport turbocharged engine. His teammate will once again be Aleksei Dudukalo. He started from pole position at the first race of the season in Italy, but finished third behind Yvan Muller and Rob Huff in race one, he retired from the second race. Contact with Huff in race two in Portugal left him 19th with damage although no penalties were applied.

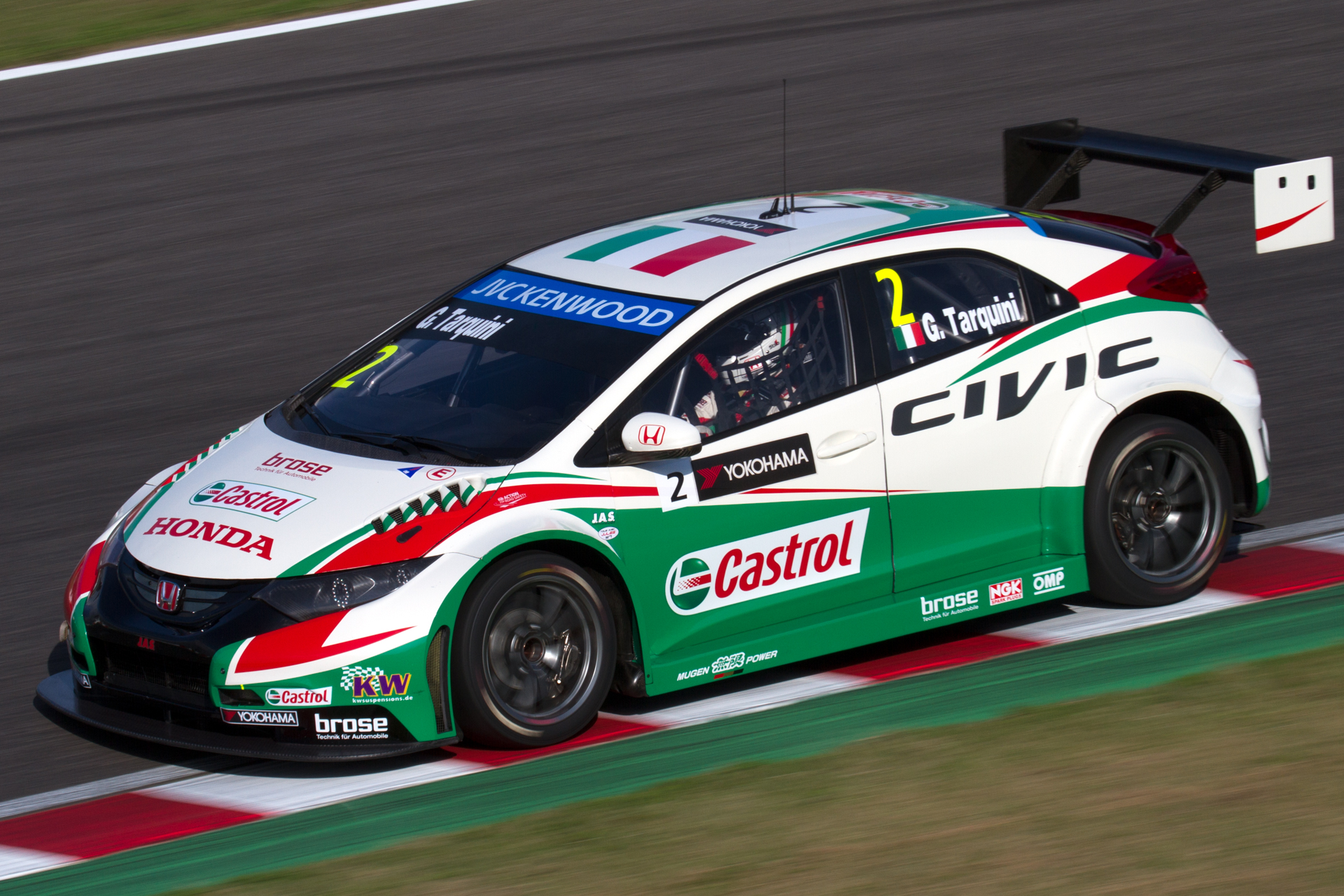
Tarquini competing in the 2014 World Touring Car Championship

==== Honda (2013–2015) ====
In July 2012, it was confirmed that Tarquini would drive a factory supported Honda Civic run by the returning JAS Motorsport team, alongside Tiago Monteiro in 2013. He qualified fifth for the season opening Race of Italy but was given a five–place grid penalty for race one having tapped René Münnich into a spin during qualifying. He finished race one in fourth and race two in third. He gave the Honda team its first pole position in the WTCC at the Race of Morocco. He finished second in race one but retired from race two when he lost control over one of the kerbs and collided with Alex MacDowall.

==== Lada (2016) ====
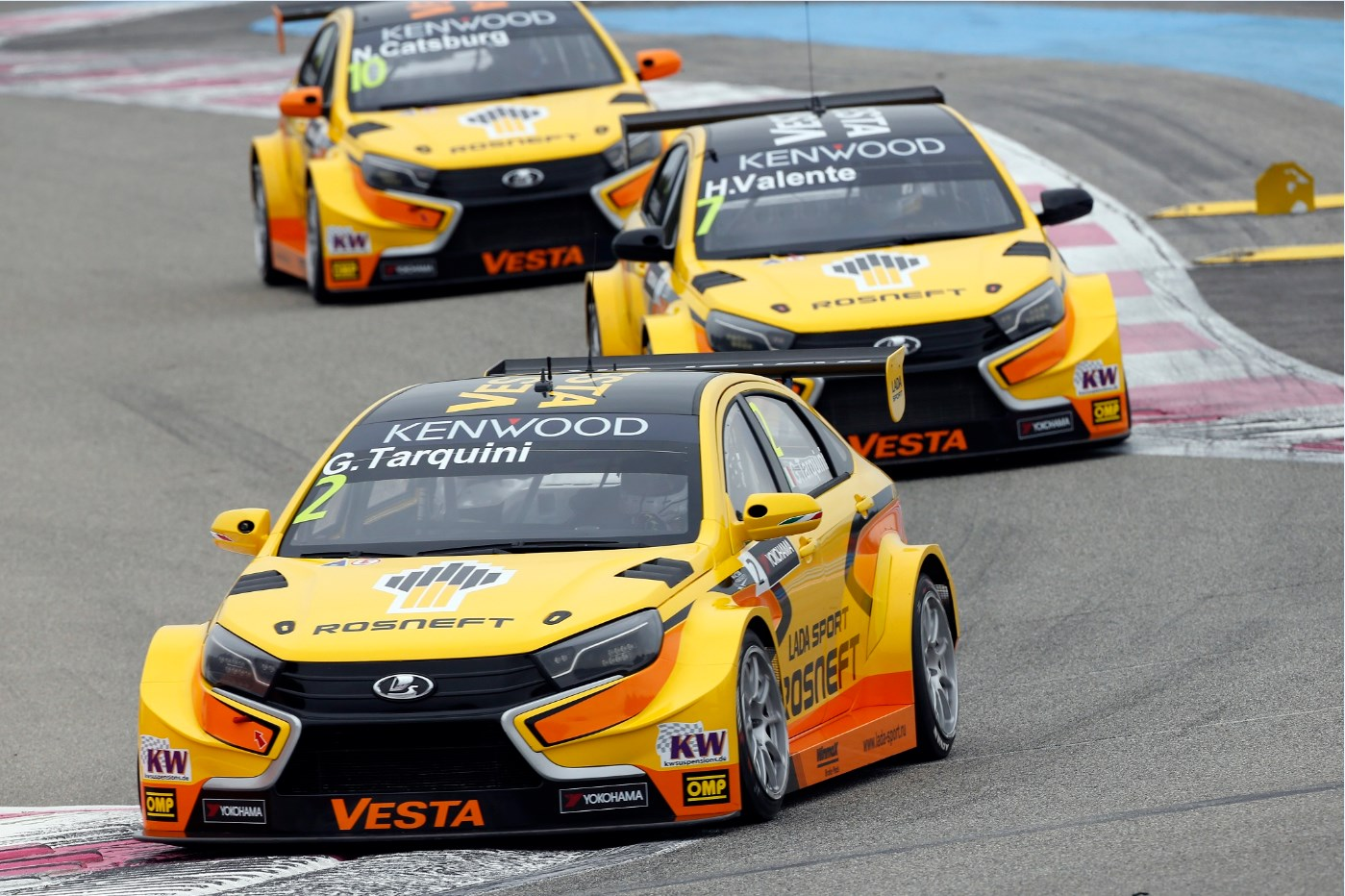
Tarquini driving for Lada at Paul Ricard during the 2016 World Touring Car Championship season.

In his last season of WTCC, Tarquini moved to the uncompetitive Lada team, where he was able to score two victories.

=== WTCR ===
==== Hyundai (2018-2021) ====
After spending the entire 2017 to develop the new Hyundai I30N, Tarquini raced in the new WTCR after the fusion between WTCC and International TCR. The 2018 season saw him again protagonist and after an incredible battle with Muller he won his fourth title after BTCC, ETCC and WTCC. He announced his retirement from racing at the 2021 Race of Italy.

In a poll conducted by Motor Sport magazine in 2005, Tarquini was voted the 11th greatest touring car driver ever.

== Management career ==
Tarquini is currently the Sporting Director of Genesis Magma Racing, which will join the 2026 FIA World Endurance Championship with the Genesis GMR-001 chassis.

== Racing record ==
=== Career summary ===
Season	Series	Team	Races	Wins	Poles	F/Laps	Podiums	Points	Position
1983	Italian Formula 3 Championship	Fernando Spreafico	7	0	0	0	0	0	NC
1984	Italian Formula 3 Championship	Fernando Spreafico	8	0	0	0	0	0	NC
1984	FIA European Formula 3 Championship	Fernando Spreafico	2	0	0	0	0	0	NC
1985	International Formula 3000	San Remo Racing	10	0	0	0	1	14	6th
1985	24 Hours of Le Mans – C1	Brun Motorsport	1	0	0	0	0	N/A	DNF
1986	International Formula 3000	Coloni Racing	9	0	0	0	1	7	10th
1986	International Formula 3000	BS Automotive	1	0	0	0	0	7	10th
1987	International Formula 3000	First Racing	11	0	0	1	2	12	8th
1987	FIA World Touring Car Championship	Brixia Corse	6	0	0	0	0	43	30th
1987	Formula One	Osella Squadra Corse	1	0	0	0	0	0	NC
1988	Formula One	Coloni SpA	16	0	0	0	0	0	NC
1988	Macau Grand Prix	Prema Racing	1	0	0	0	0	N/A	9th
1989	Formula One	Automobiles Gonfaronnaises Sportives	15	0	0	0	0	1	16th
1989	Italian Super Touring Car Championship	Bigazzi M Team	?	1	?	?	?	?	5th
1989	24 Hours of Spa – A2.5	Bastos Castrol Racing Team	1	0	0	0	0	N/A	DNF
1990	Formula One	Automobiles Gonfaronnaises Sportives	16	0	0	0	0	0	NC
1990	Italian Touring Car Championship	Bigazzi M Team	11	0	0	2	3	78	8th
1991	Formula One	Automobiles Gonfaronnaises Sportives	13	0	0	0	0	0	NC
1991	Formula One	Fondmetal F1 SpA	3	0	0	0	0	0	NC
1992	Formula One	Fondmetal F1 SpA	13	0	0	0	0	0	NC
1992	Italian Superturismo Championship	CiBiEmme Engineering	18	0	0	0	2	89	5th
1992	24 Hours of Spa – DTM2.5	BMW Fina Bastos Team	1	0	0	0	0	N/A	DNF
1993	Italian Superturismo Championship	Alfa Corse	20	5	3	?	11	207	**3rd**
1993	FIA Touring Car Challenge	Alfa Corse	2	0	0	0	0	11	17th
1994	British Touring Car Championship	Alfa Corse	17	8	2	8	14	298	**1st**
1994	Spanish Touring Car Championship	Alfa Corse	2	1	1	2	2	0	NC
1994	FIA Touring Car World Cup	Alfa Corse	1	0	0	0	0	0	4th
1995	Italian Superturismo Championship	Alfa Corse	12	2	2	4	6	88	7th
1995	British Touring Car Championship	Alfa Corse	12	0	0	0	0	33	16th
1995	FIA Touring Car World Cup	Alfa Corse	2	0	0	0	0	10	17th
1995	Deutsche Tourenwagen Meisterschaft	Alfa Corse 2	3	0	0	0	0	0	NC
1995	International Touring Car Series	Alfa Corse 2	1	0	0	0	0	0	29th
1995	Formula One	Nokia Tyrrell Yamaha	1	0	0	0	0	0	NC
1996	International Touring Car Championship	JAS Motorsport Alfa Romeo	21	1	0	1	2	60	14th
1997	British Touring Car Championship	Team Honda Sport	24	1	1	3	6	130	6th
1997	Belgian Procar	Honda Sport VZM	1	1	0	1	1	20	12th
1997	24 Hours of Spa – ST	Honda Sport VZM	1	0	1	1	0	N/A	DNF
1998	Super Tourenwagen Cup	JAS Team Honda Sport	19	1	0	1	2	335	7th
1999	Super Tourenwagen Cup	JAS Team Honda Sport	19	1	0	0	7	470	4th
1999	British Touring Car Championship	Team Honda Sport	4	0	0	1	1	17	14th
2000	British Touring Car Championship	Redstone Team Honda	24	3	1	2	6	143	6th
2000	European Super Touring Cup	JAS Engineering	3	0	0	0	0	10	16th
2000	Belgian Procar	Barwell Motorsport	1	0	0	0	0	0	NC
2001	European Super Touring Championship	JAS Engineering Italia IP	20	9	6	10	14	579	**3rd**
2002	Italian Super Production Car Championship	GTA Racing Team Nordauto	1	0	0	0	0	0	NC
2002	European Touring Car Championship	GTA Racing Team Nordauto	2	0	0	1	1	4	14th
2003	European Touring Car Championship	GTA Racing Team Nordauto	19	6	1	4	9	107	**1st**
2004	European Touring Car Championship	AutoDelta Squadra Corse	19	6	1	2	10	106	**3rd**
2004	BTCC Masters	SEAT Sport UK	1	0	0	1	1	N/A	**3rd**
2005	FIA World Touring Car Championship	Alfa Romeo Racing Team	18	2	2	3	5	55	7th
2006	FIA World Touring Car Championship	SEAT Sport Italia	19	1	2	2	2	57	5th
2007	FIA World Touring Car Championship	SEAT Sport	22	1	1	3	3	62	8th
2008	FIA World Touring Car Championship	SEAT Sport	24	3	0	0	6	88	**2nd**
2009	FIA World Touring Car Championship	SEAT Sport	24	3	5	2	12	127	**1st**
2010	FIA World Touring Car Championship	SR-Sport	22	5	3	6	10	276	**2nd**
2010	TC 2000 Championship	Equipo Petrobras	1	0	0	0	0	0	26th
2010	Trofeo Castrol SEAT Leon Supercopa	SEAT Motorsport	4	0	1	2	0	0	NC†
2011	FIA World Touring Car Championship	Lukoil-SUNRED	24	1	0	0	6	204	5th
2011	Scandinavian Touring Car Championship	Polestar Racing	4	0	0	0	0	2	24th
2012	FIA World Touring Car Championship	Lukoil Racing Team	24	1	2	0	8	252	4th
2013	FIA World Touring Car Championship	Castrol Honda World Touring Car Team	23	2	2	1	8	242	**2nd**
2014	FIA World Touring Car Championship	Castrol Honda World Touring Car Team	20	1	0	2	5	182	6th
2015	FIA World Touring Car Championship	Honda Racing Team JAS	24	0	0	3	4	197	5th
2016	FIA World Touring Car Championship	Lada Sport Rosneft	22	2	0	2	4	147	9th
2017	FIA World Touring Car Championship	Castrol Honda World Touring Car Team	2	0	0	0	0	0	NC
2017	TCR International Series	BRC Racing Team	4	1	0	2	1	0	NC†
2017	Touring Car Endurance Series - SP3-GT4	BRC Racing Team	1	0	0	0	0	0	NC†
2017	TCR Trophy Europe	BRC Racing Team	2	1	1	2	2	0	NC†
2018	FIA World Touring Car Cup	BRC Racing Team	29	5	2	4	8	306	**1st**
2019	FIA World Touring Car Cup	BRC Hyundai N Squadra Corse	30	2	0	1	6	222	8th
2019	ADAC TCR Germany Touring Car Championship	Hyundai Team Engstler	2	0	0	0	0	0	NC†
2020	FIA World Touring Car Cup	BRC Hyundai N LUKOIL Squadra Corse	14	0	0	0	2	79	14th
2021	FIA World Touring Car Cup	BRC Hyundai N Lukoil Squadra Corse	16	1	0	1	2	114	12th

† As Tarquini was a guest driver, he was ineligible for points.

=== Complete International Formula 3000 results ===
(key) (Races in bold indicate pole position; races in italics indicate fastest lap.)

Year	Entrant	Chassis	Engine	1	2	3	4	5	6	7	8	9	10	11	12	Pos.	Pts
1985	San Remo Racing	March 85B	Cosworth	SIL; 5	THR; 5	EST; 3	NÜR; C	VAL; Ret	PAU; DNS	SPA; 4	DIJ; 13	PER; 4	ÖST; 13	ZAN; Ret	DON; Ret	6th	14
1986	Coloni Racing	March 85B	Cosworth	SIL	VAL; 13	PAU; Ret	SPA; 8	IMO; 4	MUG; Ret	PER; Ret	ÖST; 3	BIR; 13	BUG; Ret			10th	7
1986	BS Automotive	Lola T86/50	Cosworth											JAR; 14		10th	7
1987	First Racing	March 87B	Cosworth	SIL; 10	VAL; Ret	SPA; 12	PAU; 11†	DON; 19	PER; 3	BRH; 17	BIR; 14	IMO; 2	BUG; 5	JAR; Ret		8th	12

† — Did not finish the race, but was classified as he completed over 90% of the race distance.

=== Complete 24 Hours of Le Mans results ===
Year	Team	Co-Drivers	Car	Class	Laps	Pos.	Class Pos.
1985	(Switzerland) Brun Motorsport	(Italy) Massimo Sigala (Argentina) Oscar Larrauri	Porsche 956	C1	323	DNF	DNF

=== Complete Formula One results ===
(key) (Races in bold indicate pole position; races in italics indicate fastest lap.)

Year	Entrant	Chassis	Engine	1	2	3	4	5	6	7	8	9	10	11	12	13	14	15	16	17	WDC	Pts
1987	Osella Squadra Corse	Osella FA1G	Alfa Romeo 890T 1.5 V8 t	BRA	SMR; Ret	BEL	MON	DET	FRA	GBR	GER	HUN	AUT	ITA	POR	ESP	MEX	JPN	AUS		NC	0
1988	Coloni SpA	Coloni FC188	Ford Cosworth DFZ 3.5 V8	BRA; Ret	SMR; Ret	MON; Ret	MEX; 14	CAN; 8	DET; DNPQ	FRA; DNPQ	GBR; DNPQ	GER; DNPQ	HUN; 13	BEL; NC							NC	0
1988	Coloni SpA	Coloni FC188B	Ford Cosworth DFZ 3.5 V8												ITA; DNQ	POR; 11	ESP; DNPQ	JPN; DNPQ	AUS; DNQ		NC	0
1989	FIRST Racing	First F189	Judd CV 3.5 V8	BRA; DNA																	26th	1
1989	Automobiles Gonfaronnaises Sportives	AGS JH23B	Ford Cosworth DFR 3.5 V8		SMR; 8	MON; Ret	MEX; 6	USA; 7^{†}	CAN; Ret	FRA; Ret		GER; DNPQ									26th	1
1989	Automobiles Gonfaronnaises Sportives	AGS JH24	Ford Cosworth DFR 3.5 V8								GBR; DNQ		HUN; DNPQ	BEL; DNPQ	ITA; DNPQ	POR; DNPQ	ESP; DNPQ	JPN; DNPQ	AUS; DNPQ		26th	1
1990	Automobiles Gonfaronnaises Sportives	AGS JH24	Ford Cosworth DFR 3.5 V8	USA; DNPQ	BRA; DNPQ																NC	0
1990	Automobiles Gonfaronnaises Sportives	AGS JH25	Ford Cosworth DFR 3.5 V8			SMR; DNPQ	MON; DNPQ	CAN; DNPQ	MEX; DNPQ	FRA; DNQ	GBR; Ret	GER; DNPQ	HUN; 13	BEL; DNQ	ITA; DNQ	POR; DNQ	ESP; Ret	JPN; DNQ	AUS; Ret		NC	0
1991	Automobiles Gonfaronnaises Sportives	AGS JH25	Ford Cosworth DFR 3.5 V8	USA; 8	BRA; Ret	SMR; DNQ	MON; Ret	CAN; DNQ	MEX; DNQ												NC	0
1991	Automobiles Gonfaronnaises Sportives	AGS JH25B	Ford Cosworth DFR 3.5 V8							FRA; DNQ	GBR; DNQ	GER; DNQ	HUN; DNPQ	BEL; DNPQ							NC	0
1991	Automobiles Gonfaronnaises Sportives	AGS JH27	Ford Cosworth DFR 3.5 V8												ITA; DNPQ	POR; DNQ					NC	0
1991	Fondmetal F1 SpA	Fomet F1	Ford Cosworth DFR 3.5 V8														ESP; 12	JPN; 11	AUS; DNPQ		NC	0
1992	Fondmetal F1 SpA	Fondmetal GR01	Ford HBA5 3.5 V8	RSA; Ret	MEX; Ret	BRA; Ret	ESP; Ret	SMR; Ret	MON; Ret												NC	0
1992	Fondmetal F1 SpA	Fondmetal GR02	Ford HBA5 3.5 V8							CAN; Ret	FRA; Ret	GBR; 14	GER; Ret	HUN; Ret	BEL; Ret	ITA; Ret	POR	JPN	AUS		NC	0
1995	Nokia Tyrrell Yamaha	Tyrrell 023	Yamaha OX10C 3.0 V10	BRA	ARG	SMR	ESP	MON	CAN	FRA	GBR	GER	HUN	BEL	ITA	POR	EUR; 14	PAC	JPN	AUS	NC	0

^{†} Did not finish, but was classified as he had completed more than 90% of the race distance.

=== Complete British Touring Car Championship results ===
(key) (Races in bold indicate pole position – 1 point awarded 1996 onwards all races) (Races in italics indicate fastest lap) (* signifies that driver lead feature race for at least one lap – 1 point given 1998 onwards)

Year	Team	Car	Class	1	2	3	4	5	6	7	8	9	10	11	12	13	14	15	16	17	18	19	20	21	22	23	24	25	26	DC	Pts
1994	Alfa Corse	Alfa Romeo 155 TS		**THR**; **1**; 1	**BRH**; **1**; 1	**BRH**; **2**; 1	SNE; 1; 1	SIL; 1; 1	**SIL**; **2** DNS	OUL; 1 WD	DON; 1; 3	DON; 2 DNS	BRH; 1; 1	**BRH**; **2**; 1	SIL; 1; 2	KNO; 1 Ret	KNO; 2 DNS	OUL; 1; 3	BRH; 1; 2	BRH; 2; 2	SIL; 1; 2	SIL; 2; 1	DON; 1 Ret	DON; 2; 4						**1st**	**298**
1995	Alfa Romeo Old Spice Racing	Alfa Romeo 155 TS		DON; 1	DON; 2	BRH; 1	BRH; 2	THR; 1	THR; 2	SIL; 1	SIL; 2	OUL; 1; 11	OUL; 2 Ret	BRH; 1	BRH; 2	DON; 1	DON; 2	SIL; 1	KNO; 1 Ret	KNO; 2; 8	BRH; 1 Ret	BRH; 2; 4	SNE; 1; 4	SNE; 2 Ret	OUL; 1; 4	OUL; 2; 13	SIL; 1 Ret	SIL; 2; 15		16th	33
1997	Team Honda Sport	Honda Accord		DON; 1; 7	DON; 2; 4	SIL; 1; 5	SIL; 2; 15	THR; 1; 2	THR; 2; 1	BRH; 1; 6	**BRH**; **2**; 2	OUL; 1 Ret	OUL; 2 Ret	DON; 1 Ret	DON; 2; 6	CRO; 1; 17	CRO; 2 Ret	KNO; 1; 7	KNO; 2; 3	SNE; 1 Ret	SNE; 2; 3	THR; 1; 4	THR; 2; 4	BRH; 1 Ret	BRH; 2; 7	SIL; 1; 4	SIL; 2; 3			6th	130
1999	Team Honda Sport	Honda Accord		DON; 1	DON; 2	SIL; 1	SIL; 2	THR; 1	THR; 2	BRH; 1	BRH; 2	OUL; 1	OUL; 2	DON; 1	DON; 2	CRO; 1	CRO; 2	SNE; 1	SNE; 2	THR; 1	THR; 2	KNO; 1; 2	KNO; 2; 6	BRH; 1 Ret	BRH; 2 Ret	OUL; 1	OUL; 2	SIL; 1	SIL; 2	14th	17
2000	Redstone Team Honda	Honda Accord	S	BRH; 1 ovr:9 cls:9	BRH; 2 ovr:6* cls:6	DON; 1 ovr:4 cls:4	DON; 2 ovr:2* cls:2	THR; 1 Ret	THR; 2 ovr:5 cls:5	KNO; 1 Ret	**KNO**; **2** ovr:1* cls:1	OUL; 1 ovr:9 cls:9	OUL; 2 ovr:8 cls:8	SIL; 1 ovr:5 cls:5	SIL; 2 ovr:2 cls:2	CRO; 1 ovr:6 cls:6	CRO; 2 Ret‡	SNE; 1 ovr:6 cls:6	SNE; 2 ovr:7 cls:7	**DON**; **1** ovr:6 cls:6	**DON**; **2** ovr:1* cls:1	BRH; 1 ovr:9 cls:9	BRH; 2 ovr:10 cls:10	OUL; 1 ovr:2 cls:2	**OUL**; **2** ovr:1* cls:1	SIL; 1 Ret	SIL; 2 ovr:6 cls:6			6th	149

‡ Retired before second start of race

=== Complete Deutsche Tourenwagen Meisterschaft results ===
(key) (Races in bold indicate pole position) (Races in italics indicate fastest lap)

Year	Team	Car	1	2	3	4	5	6	7	8	9	10	11	12	13	14	Pos	Pts
1995	Alfa Corse 2	Alfa Romeo 155 V6 Ti	HOC; 1	HOC; 2	AVU; 1	AVU; 2	NOR; 1	NOR; 2	DIE; 1	DIE; 2	NÜR; 1 Ret	NÜR; 2 Ret	SIN; 1 Ret	SIN; 2 DNS	HOC; 1	HOC; 2	NC	0

=== Complete International Touring Car Championship results ===
(key) (Races in bold indicate pole position) (Races in italics indicate fastest lap)

Year	Team	Car	1	2	3	4	5	6	7	8	9	10	11	12	13	14	15	16	17	18	19	20	21	22	23	24	25	26	Pos	Points
1995	Alfa Corse 2	Alfa Romeo 155 V6 Ti	MUG; 1	MUG; 2	HEL; 1	HEL; 2	DON; 1	DON; 2	EST; 1	EST; 2	MAG; 1; 17†	MAG; 2 DNS																	29th	0
1996	JAS Motorsport Alfa Romeo	Alfa Romeo 155 V6 TI	HOC; 1 Ret	HOC; 2 DNS	NÜR; 1; 10	NÜR; 2; 5	EST; 1 Ret	EST; 2; 14	HEL; 1 Ret	HEL; 2 DNS	NOR; 1 Ret	NOR; 2 DNS	DIE; 1; 20	DIE; 2 Ret	SIL; 1; 2	SIL; 2; 1	NÜR; 1 Ret	NÜR; 2; 17	MAG; 1; 15†	MAG; 2 Ret	MUG; 1; 13	MUG; 2; 6	HOC; 1; 4	HOC; 2 Ret	INT; 1 Ret	INT; 2 DNS	SUZ; 1 DNS	SUZ; 2 Ret	14th	60

† — Did not finish the race, but was classified as he completed over 90% of the race distance.

=== Complete Super Tourenwagen Cup results ===
(key) (Races in bold indicate pole position) (Races in italics indicate fastest lap)

Year	Team	Car	1	2	3	4	5	6	7	8	9	10	11	12	13	14	15	16	17	18	19	20	Pos.	Pts
1998	JAS Team Honda Sport	Honda Accord	HOC; 1; 7	HOC; 2; 11	NÜR; 1; 8	NÜR; 2 Ret	SAC; 1; 5	SAC; 2; 4	NOR; 1; 5	NOR; 2; 7	REG; 1; 3	REG; 2; 1	WUN; 1 Ret	WUN; 2 DNS	ZWE; 1; 4	ZWE; 2; 22	SAL; 1; 5	SAL; 2; 4	OSC; 1; 16	OSC; 2; 12	NÜR; 1; 21	NÜR; 2; 9	7th	335
1999	JAS Team Honda Sport	Honda Accord	SAC; 1; 8	SAC; 2; 7	ZWE; 1; 7	ZWE; 2; 3	OSC; 1; 3	OSC; 2; 5	NOR; 1; 16	NOR; 2 DNS	MIS; 1; 4	MIS; 2; 3	NÜR; 1; 2	NÜR; 2; 3	SAL; 1 Ret	SAL; 2; 6	OSC; 1; 1	OSC; 2; 2	HOC; 1; 6	HOC; 2; 6	NÜR; 1; 11	NÜR; 2; 3	4th	470

=== Complete European Touring Car Championship results ===
(key) (Races in bold indicate pole position) (Races in italics indicate fastest lap)

Year	Team	Car	1	2	3	4	5	6	7	8	9	10	11	12	13	14	15	16	17	18	19	20	DC	Pts
2000	JAS Engineering	Honda Accord	MUG; 1	MUG; 2	PER; 1	PER; 2	A1R; 1	A1R; 2	MNZ; 1	MNZ; 2	HUN; 1	HUN; 2	IMO; 1	IMO; 2	MIS; 1	MIS; 2	BRN; 1	BRN; 2	VAL; 1; 7	VAL; 2 DNS	MOB; 1; 11	MOB; 2; 6	16th	10
2001	JAS Engineering Italia IP	Honda Accord	**MNZ**; **1** Ret	MNZ; 2; 1	BRN; 1 Ret	BRN; 2; 3	MAG; 1; 1	MAG; 2 Ret	**SIL**; **1**; 1	SIL; 2; 1	**ZOL**; **1**; 1	ZOL; 2; 14	HUN; 1; 2	HUN; 2; 4	**A1R**; **1**; 1	A1R; 2; 1	**NÜR**; **1**; 2	NÜR; 2; 2	**JAR**; **1**; 1	JAR; 2; 1	EST; 1; 2	EST; 2 Ret	**3rd**	**579**
2002	GTA Racing Team Nordauto	Alfa Romeo 156 GTA	MAG; 1	MAG; 2	SIL; 1	SIL; 2	BRN; 1	BRN; 2	JAR; 1	JAR; 2	AND; 1	AND; 2	OSC; 1	OSC; 2	SPA; 1	SPA; 2	PER; 1	PER; 2	DON; 1; 3	DON; 2; 7	EST; 1	EST; 2	14th	4
2003	GTA Racing Team Nordauto	Alfa Romeo 156 GTA	**VAL**; **1**; 1	VAL; 2; 4	MAG; 1; 4	MAG; 2 Ret	PER; 1; 3	PER; 2; 1	BRN; 1; 6	BRN; 2; 4	DON; 1; 1	DON; 2; 17	SPA; 1; 1	SPA; 2; 14	AND; 1 Ret	AND; 2 DNS	OSC; 1; 2	OSC; 2; 5	EST; 1; 1	EST; 2; 1	MNZ; 1; 4	MNZ; 2; 3	**1st**	**107**
2004	AutoDelta Squadra Corse	Alfa Romeo 156	**MNZ**; **1**; 1	MNZ; 2 Ret	VAL; 1; 1	VAL; 2; 2	MAG; 1; 5	MAG; 2; 2	HOC; 1 Ret	HOC; 2; 6	BRN; 1; 9	BRN; 2 Ret	DON; 1; 3	DON; 2; 2	SPA; 1; 5	SPA; 2; 4	IMO; 1; 1	IMO; 2; 1	OSC; 1 Ret	OSC; 2 DNS	DUB; 1; 1	DUB; 2; 1	**3rd**	**106**

=== Complete World Touring Car Championship results ===
(key) (Races in bold indicate pole position) (Races in italics indicate fastest lap)

Year	Team	Car	1	2	3	4	5	6	7	8	9	10	11	12	13	14	15	16	17	18	19	20	21	22	23	24	DC	Points
2005	Alfa Romeo Racing Team	Alfa Romeo 156	ITA; 1; 2	ITA; 2 Ret	FRA; 1; 4	FRA; 2; 8	**GBR**; **1**; 1	GBR; 2; 3	SMR; 1; 15	SMR; 2; 10	MEX; 1; 2	MEX; 2 Ret	BEL; 1; 4	BEL; 2; 17†	GER; 1; 13	GER; 2; 14	**TUR**; **1**; 7	TUR; 2; 1	ESP; 1; 16	ESP; 2; 23†	MAC; 1 DNS	MAC; 2 DNS					7th	55
2006	SEAT Sport Italia	SEAT León	ITA; 1; 5	ITA; 2; 6	**FRA**; **1**; 4	FRA; 2; 5	GBR; 1; 6	GBR; 2; 4	GER; 1; 4	GER; 2; 7	BRA; 1; 4	BRA; 2; 5	MEX; 1; 10	MEX; 2; 8	**CZE**; **1** Ret	CZE; 2; 10	TUR; 1; 3	TUR; 2; 1	ESP; 1; 24†	ESP; 2 DNS	MAC; 1; 11	MAC; 2 Ret					5th	57
2007	SEAT Sport	SEAT León	BRA; 1; 4	BRA; 2; 5	NED; 1; 7	NED; 2; 1	ESP; 1 Ret	ESP; 2; 24†	FRA; 1; 19	FRA; 2; 12	CZE; 1; 7	CZE; 2; 4	POR; 1; 4	POR; 2; 7	SWE; 1; 5	SWE; 2; 7	**GER**; **1**; 2	GER; 2; 7	GBR; 1; 10	GBR; 2 Ret							8th	62
2007	SEAT Sport	SEAT León TDI																			ITA; 1; 6	ITA; 2 Ret	MAC; 1; 2	MAC; 2; 14			8th	62
2008	SEAT Sport	SEAT León TDI	BRA; 1; 5	BRA; 2; 1	MEX; 1; 5	MEX; 2; 3	ESP; 1; 2	ESP; 2; 5	FRA; 1; 5	FRA; 2; 4	CZE; 1; 6	CZE; 2; 1	POR; 1; 13	POR; 2; 11	GBR; 1; 7	GBR; 2; 5	GER; 1; 24	GER; 2; 16	EUR; 1; 5	EUR; 2 Ret	ITA; 1; 2	ITA; 2; 1	JPN; 1; 10	JPN; 2 Ret	MAC; 1; 7	MAC; 2; 12†	**2nd**	**88**
2009	SEAT Sport	SEAT León TDI	BRA; 1; 4	BRA; 2; 1	MEX; 1; 6	MEX; 2; 8	MAR; 1; 2	MAR; 2; 5	FRA; 1; 12	FRA; 2; 6	**ESP**; **1**; 3	ESP; 2; 3	CZE; 1; 3	CZE; 2; 5	**POR**; **1**; 1	POR; 2 Ret	GBR; 1; 4	GBR; 2; 3	**GER**; **1**; 2	GER; 2; 3	**ITA**; **1**; 1	ITA; 2; 2	**JPN**; **1**; 5	JPN; 2; 7	MAC; 1; 2	MAC; 2; 5	**1st**	**127**
2010	SR-Sport	SEAT León TDI	BRA; 1; 4	BRA; 2; 1	**MAR**; **1**; 1	MAR; 2; 6	ITA; 1; 7	ITA; 2; 20†	**BEL**; **1**; 1	BEL; 2; 6	POR; 1; 3	POR; 2; 1	GBR; 1; 4	GBR; 2; 3	CZE; 1; 2	CZE; 2; 18†	GER; 1 Ret	GER; 2; 9	**ESP**; **1**; 1	ESP; 2; 3	JPN; 1; 5	JPN; 2 Ret	MAC; 1; 4	MAC; 2; 2			**2nd**	**276**
2011	Lukoil-SUNRED	SEAT León 2.0 TDI	BRA; 1; 7	BRA; 2; 6	BEL; 1; 4	BEL; 2; 1	ITA; 1 Ret	ITA; 2; 10	HUN; 1; 6	HUN; 2; 3																	5th	204
2011	Lukoil-SUNRED	SUNRED SR León 1.6T									CZE; 1 NC	CZE; 2; 6	POR; 1; 5	POR; 2; 7	GBR; 1; 5	GBR; 2; 7	GER; 1; 3	GER; 2; 3	ESP; 1; 17†	ESP; 2; 4	JPN; 1; 9	JPN; 2 Ret	CHN; 1 NC	CHN; 2; 2	MAC; 1; 3	MAC; 2; 4	5th	204
2012	Lukoil Racing Team	SEAT León WTCC	**ITA**; **1**; 3	ITA; 2 Ret	ESP; 1; 2	ESP; 2; 9	MAR; 1; 11	MAR; 2 Ret	SVK; 1; 1	SVK; 2; 3	HUN; 1 Ret	HUN; 2; 6	AUT; 1; 4	AUT; 2; 16	**POR**; **1**; 2	POR; 2; 19†	BRA; 1; 4	BRA; 2; 3	USA; 1; 4	USA; 2; 3	JPN; 1; 4	JPN; 2; 3	CHN; 1; 5	CHN; 2; 6	MAC; 1; 4	MAC; 2; 20†	4th	252
2013	Castrol Honda World Touring Car Team	Honda Civic WTCC	ITA; 1; 4	ITA; 2; 3	**MAR**; **1**; 2	MAR; 2 Ret	**SVK**; **1**; 1	SVK; 2; 3	HUN; 1; 3	HUN; 2 Ret	AUT; 1; 12	AUT; 2; 8	RUS; 1; 6	RUS; 2; 7	POR; 1 Ret	POR; 2; 20	ARG; 1; 4	ARG; 2; 2	USA; 1; 6	USA; 2; 1	JPN; 1; 27†	JPN; 2; 4	CHN; 1; 7	CHN; 2; 2	MAC; 1 DNS	MAC; 2; 8	**2nd**	**242**
2014	Castrol Honda World Touring Car Team	Honda Civic WTCC	MAR; 1 DNS	MAR; 2 DNS	FRA; 1; 3	FRA; 2; 4	HUN; 1; 4	HUN; 2; 8	SVK; 1; 8	SVK; 2 C	AUT; 1; 8	**AUT**; **2**; 2	RUS; 1; 2	RUS; 2 Ret	BEL; 1; 8	BEL; 2; 8	ARG; 1; 8	ARG; 2; 4	BEI; 1; 16†	BEI; 2; 10	CHN; 1; 6	CHN; 2 Ret	JPN; 1; 6	**JPN**; **2**; 1	MAC; 1; 3	MAC; 2 DNS	6th	182
2015	Honda Racing Team JAS	Honda Civic WTCC	ARG; 1; 5	ARG; 2; 4	MAR; 1; 7	MAR; 2; 5	HUN; 1 DSQ	HUN; 2; 13	GER; 1; 6	GER; 2; 4	RUS; 1; 3	RUS; 2 Ret	SVK; 1; 6	SVK; 2; 4	FRA; 1; 8	FRA; 2; 5	POR; 1; 4	POR; 2; 3	JPN; 1; 3	JPN; 2; 12	CHN; 1 Ret	CHN; 2; 2	THA; 1; 5	THA; 2; 5	QAT; 1; 15	QAT; 2; 7	5th	197
2016	Lada Sport Rosneft	Lada Vesta WTCC	FRA; 1 Ret	FRA; 2 Ret	SVK; 1; 4	SVK; 2; 13	HUN; 1; 5	HUN; 2 Ret	MAR; 1; 4	MAR; 2; 3	GER; 1; 7	GER; 2; 9	RUS; 1; 1	RUS; 2; 2	POR; 1; 12	POR; 2; 13	ARG; 1; 14	ARG; 2; 13	JPN; 1; 10	JPN; 2; 10	CHN; 1; 16†	CHN; 2; 5	QAT; 1; 1	QAT; 2; 7			9th	147
2017	Castrol Honda World Touring Car Team	Honda Civic WTCC	MAR; 1	MAR; 2	ITA; 1	ITA; 2	HUN; 1	HUN; 2	GER; 1	GER; 2	POR; 1	POR; 2	ARG; 1	ARG; 2	CHN; 1 DSQ	CHN; 2 DSQ	JPN; 1	JPN; 2	MAC; 1	MAC; 2	QAT; 1	QAT; 2					NC	0

^{†} Did not finish the race, but was classified as he completed over 90% of the race distance.

=== Complete World Touring Car Cup results ===
(key) (Races in bold indicate pole position) (Races in italics indicate fastest lap)

Year	Team	Car	1	2	3	4	5	6	7	8	9	10	11	12	13	14	15	16	17	18	19	20	21	22	23	24	25	26	27	28	29	30	DC	Points
2018	BRC Racing Team	Hyundai i30 N TCR	MAR; 1; 1	MAR; 2; 19†	**MAR**; **3**; 1	HUN; 1; 6	HUN; 2; 4	HUN; 3; 1	GER; 1 Ret	GER; 2 Ret	GER; 3 DNS	NED; 1 Ret	NED; 2; 19	NED; 3; 18	POR; 1; 4	POR; 2; 9	POR; 3; 2	**SVK**; **1**; 3	SVK; 2; 1	SVK; 3 Ret	CHN; 1; 4	CHN; 2 Ret	CHN; 3; 2	WUH; 1; 17	WUH; 2 NC	WUH; 3; 13	JPN; 1; 8	JPN; 2; 5	JPN; 3; 1	MAC; 1; 4	MAC; 2 Ret	MAC; 3; 10	1st	306
2019	BRC Hyundai N Squadra Corse	Hyundai i30 N TCR	MAR; 1; 4	MAR; 2; 1	MAR; 3; 5	HUN; 1; 13	HUN; 2; 17	HUN; 3; 1	SVK; 1; 6	SVK; 2; 19	SVK; 3; 9	NED; 1; 20	NED; 2; 13	NED; 3; 9	GER; 1 Ret	GER; 2; 23	GER; 3; 5	POR; 1 Ret	POR; 2 Ret	POR; 3; 14	CHN; 1 Ret	CHN; 2; 2	CHN; 3; 3	JPN; 1; 7	JPN; 2; 3	JPN; 3; 4	MAC; 1; 9	MAC; 2; 11	MAC; 3 Ret	MAL; 1; 3	MAL; 2; 26	MAL; 3; 18	8th	222
2020	BRC Hyundai N LUKOIL Squadra Corse	Hyundai i30 N TCR	BEL; 1; 15	BEL; 2; 15	GER; 1 DNP	GER; 2 DNP	SVK; 1; 2	SVK; 2 Ret	SVK; 3 Ret	HUN; 1 NC	HUN; 2; 18	HUN; 3; 7	ESP; 1; 5	ESP; 2; 5	ESP; 3; 3	ARA; 1; 15	ARA; 2 Ret	ARA; 3; 13															14th	79
2021	BRC Hyundai N Lukoil Squadra Corse	Hyundai Elantra N TCR	GER; 1; 6	GER; 2 Ret	POR; 1 Ret	POR; 2; 4	ESP; 1; 1	ESP; 2; 6	HUN; 1; 12	HUN; 2 Ret	CZE; 1; 10	CZE; 2 Ret	FRA; 1; 3	FRA; 2; 8	ITA; 1; 9	ITA; 2; 5	RUS; 1; 14	RUS; 2 Ret															12th	114

^{†} Driver did not finish the race, but was classified as he completed over 90% of the race distance.

=== Complete Scandinavian Touring Car Championship results ===
(key) (Races in bold indicate pole position) (Races in italics indicate fastest lap)

Year	Team	Car	1	2	3	4	5	6	7	8	9	10	11	12	13	14	15	16	17	18	DC	Points
2011	Polestar Racing	Volvo C30	JYL; 1	JYL; 2	KNU; 1	KNU; 2	MAN; 1	MAN; 2	GÖT; 1	GÖT; 2	FAL; 1	FAL; 2	KAR; 1; 11	KAR; 2; 13	JYL; 1 Ret	JYL; 2; 9	KNU; 1	KNU; 2	MAN; 1	MAN; 2	24th	2

=== Complete TCR International Series results ===
(key) (Races in bold indicate pole position) (Races in italics indicate fastest lap)

Year	Team	Car	1	2	3	4	5	6	7	8	9	10	11	12	13	14	15	16	17	18	19	20	DC	Points
2017	BRC Racing Team	Hyundai i30 N TCR	RIM; 1	RIM; 2	BHR; 1	BHR; 2	SPA; 1	SPA; 2	MNZ; 1	MNZ; 2	SAL; 1	SAL; 2	HUN; 1	HUN; 2	OSC; 1	OSC; 2	CHA; 1	CHA; 2	ZHE; 1; 1	ZHE; 2; 6	DUB; 1; 15	DUB; 2; 9	NC‡	0‡

^{‡} As Tarquini was a guest driver, he was ineligible to score points.

== Notes ==
Sporting positions
Preceded by Gianni Morbidelli	Formula One Indoor Trophy; Winner; 1991	Succeeded by Johnny Herbert
Preceded by Joachim Winkelhock	British Touring Car Championship; Champion; 1994	Succeeded by John Cleland
Preceded by Fabrizio Giovanardi	European Touring Car Championship; Champion; 2003	Succeeded by Andy Priaulx
Preceded by Yvan Muller	World Touring Car Championship; Champion; 2009	Succeeded by Yvan Muller
Preceded by Thed Björk (WTCC)	World Touring Car Cup; Champion; 2018	Succeeded by Norbert Michelisz
Awards and achievements
Preceded by Kelvin Burt	Autosport; National Racing Driver of the Year; 1994	Succeeded by John Cleland
