= 1996 Formula One Indoor Trophy =

The 1996 Formula One Indoor Trophy took place on December 7–8 at the Bologna Motor Show. The winner was Giancarlo Fisichella in a Benetton-Renault. The 1996 running of the event was the last non-championship Formula One event of any kind, as the event switched to Formula 3000 cars for the next year's running.

== Participants ==
| Driver | Team |
|---|---|
| (Italy) Giancarlo Fisichella | Benetton-Renault |
| (Italy) Giovanni Lavaggi | Minardi-Ford |
| (Brazil) Tarso Marques | Minardi-Ford |
| (Japan) Shinji Nakano | Ligier-Mugen Honda |
| (France) Olivier Panis | Ligier-Mugen Honda |
| (Italy) Jarno Trulli | Benetton-Renault |

== Results ==
=== Preliminary rounds ===
| Pos | Driver | Team | Points |
|---|---|---|---|
| 1 | (Italy) Jarno Trulli | Benetton-Renault | 18 |
| 2 | (Italy) Giancarlo Fisichella | Benetton-Renault | 14 |
| 3 | (Italy) Giovanni Lavaggi | Minardi-Ford | 10 |
| 4 | (Japan) Shinji Nakano | Ligier-Mugen Honda | 8 † |
| 5 | (Brazil) Tarso Marques | Minardi-Ford | 6 |
| 6 | (France) Olivier Panis | Ligier-Mugen Honda | 2 |

† By finishing fourth, Nakano should have progressed to the knockout stage. However, by crashing his car he could not compete and his place was inherited by Tarso Marques.

=== Knockout stage ===
Semi-finals
(Italy) Giancarlo Fisichella | 2
(Brazil) Tarso Marques | 0
(Italy) Jarno Trulli | 0
(Italy) Giovanni Lavaggi | 2

Final
(Italy) Giancarlo Fisichella | 2
(Italy) Giovanni Lavaggi | 0
