= 1988 Formula One Indoor Trophy =

Seasons
- ← none 1989 →

The 1988 Formula One Indoor Trophy took place on December 7–8 at the Bologna Motor Show. The winner was Luis Pérez-Sala in a Minardi-Ford.

== Participants ==
This was the inaugural Formula One Indoor Trophy, held after the close of the 1988 season. Of the six participants, five were Italians, and none were from any of the leading teams.

Nicola Larini was representing Osella, as he had for the entire season and had the only turbocharged car with the Osella 890T V8. Minardi sent two representatives, Pierluigi Martini and the only non-Italian at the event, Spaniard Luis Pérez-Sala. These were the drivers that had driven for them in the regular season, after Martini replaced Adrian Campos mid-season.

EuroBrun had been represented by Oscar Larrauri and Stefano Modena during the season, but it was Fabrizio Barbazza, who had never driven in a Grand Prix, who drove the car at the Indoor Trophy. BMS Scuderia Italia also sent along one of their Dallara cars, driven by regular driver Alex Caffi.

The only other entrant was from FIRST, who were not even an F1 constructor at the time, but in fact an International Formula 3000 entrant. The car was driven by Gabriele Tarquini, who had driven for the team in F3000 in 1987, but by the time of the Indoor Trophy was driving for French team AGS.

| Driver | Team |
|---|---|
| (Italy) Fabrizio Barbazza | EuroBrun-Ford |
| (Italy) Alex Caffi | BMS Dallara-Ford |
| (Italy) Nicola Larini | Osella |
| (Italy) Pierluigi Martini | Minardi-Ford |
| (Spain) Luis Pérez-Sala | Minardi-Ford |
| (Italy) Gabriele Tarquini | FIRST-Judd |

== Results ==
The six drivers were drawn into three quarter final head to head races. Caffi would face Larini, Martini would face Tarquini and Pérez-Sala would face Barbazza. As could be expected from the form of the season, Caffi, Martini and Pérez-Sala were all victorious. As the closest loser, Larini also progressed to the semi-finals to make up the full complement of four.

Larini was defeated again in the semis by Pérez-Sala, but Caffi pulled a surprise against Martini to prevent an all-Minardi final. In that final though, Pérez-Sala once again followed the expected course, taking the victory.

Preliminary Rounds

| Pos | Driver | Constructor | Time | Gap |
|---|---|---|---|---|
| 1 | (Italy) Alex Caffi | (Italy) Dallara-Ford Cosworth | 57"13 | |
| 2 | (Spain) Luis Pérez-Sala | (Italy) Minardi-Ford Cosworth | 57"17 | +0"04 |
| 3 | (Italy) Nicola Larini | (Italy) Osella | 59"68 | +2"55 |
| 4 | (Italy) Fabrizio Barbazza | (Italy) EuroBrun-Ford Cosworth | 1'02"01 | +4"88 |
| 5 | (Italy) Gabriele Tarquini | (Italy) First-Judd | 1'02"31 | +5"18 |
| 6 | (Italy) Pierluigi Martini | (Italy) Minardi-Ford Cosworth | - | |

Quarter-finals
(Italy) | Alex Caffi
(Italy) | Nicola Larini
(Italy) | Pierluigi Martini
(Italy) | Gabriele Tarquini
(Spain) | Luis Pérez-Sala
(Italy) | Fabrizio Barbazza

Semi-finals
(Italy) | Alex Caffi
(Italy) | Pierluigi Martini
(Spain) | Luis Pérez-Sala
(Italy) | Nicola Larini

Final
(Italy) | Alex Caffi
(Spain) | Luis Pérez-Sala
