= Claudio Antonioli =

Italian racing driver and store owner

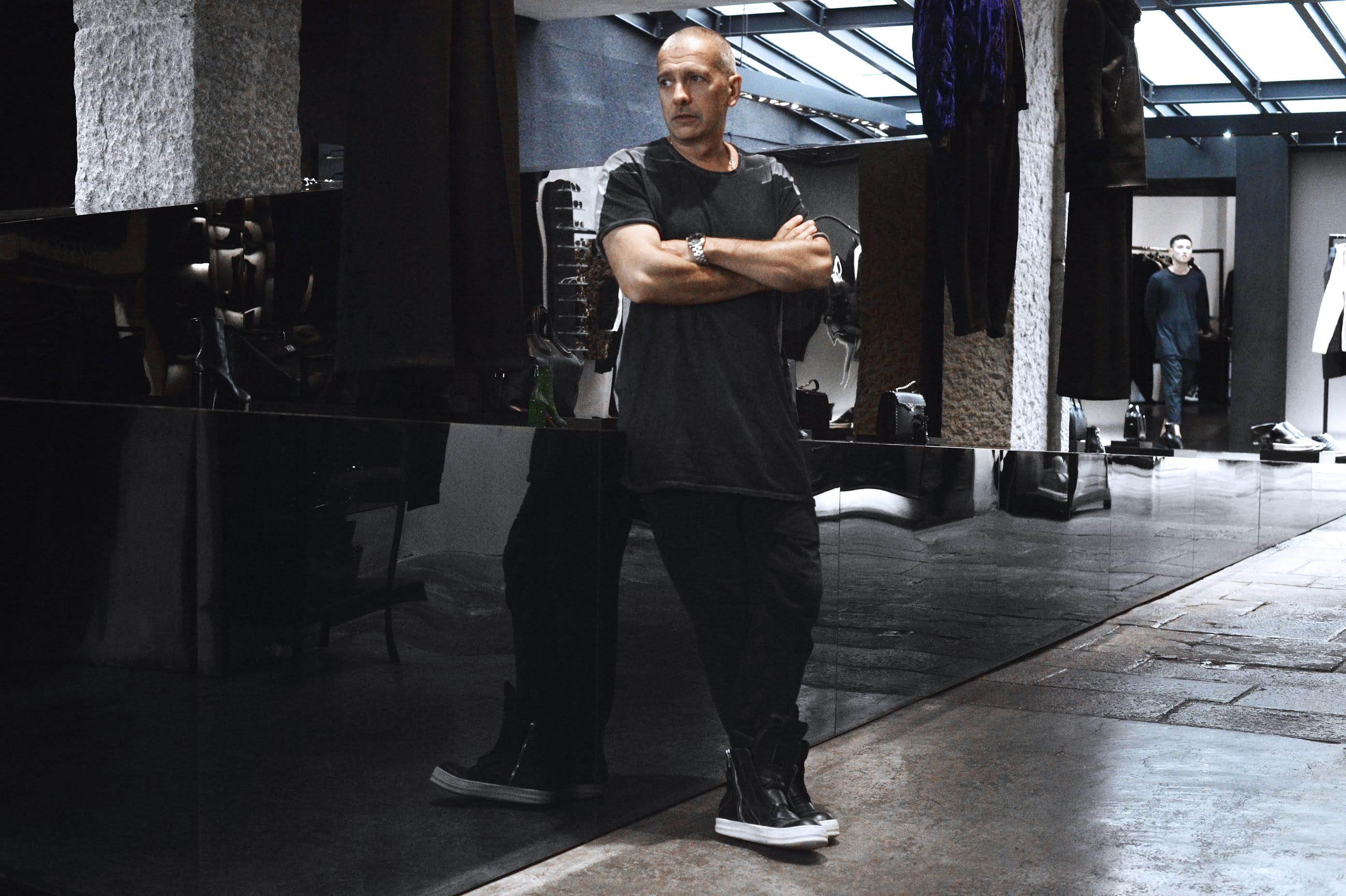
Claudio Antonioli in his Milan shop, 2020.

Claudio Antonioli (born 4 December 1962) is an Italian entrepreneur whose work lies at the intersection of fashion, music, retail and lifestyle. He was also an Italian racing driver. He founded Antonioli in Milan, one of the first and most influential multi-brand boutiques in Italy, located on the Navigli area. The space quickly became a reference point for avant-garde fashion, presenting designers such as Ann Demeulemeester, Dries Van Noten, Haider Ackermann and Rick Owens across menswear, womenswear, footwear and accessories. The store combines retail, exhibition and curation, reflecting Antonioli’s vision of fashion as a cultural experience rather than a purely commercial act.

In 2008, he expanded the business into the digital sphere with the launch of antonioli.eu, anticipating an e-commerce model that combined personalised service with an extensive visual archive of collections. The platform also featured interviews and exclusive content with designers such as Rick Owens, Kris Van Assche and Damir Doma, further consolidating Antonioli’s position within the inner circles of the fashion system. Antonioli’s physical network expanded in the following years with a boutique in Lugano and two boutiques in Ibiza. Beyond retail, Antonioli was co-founder of New Guards Group, a company that played a pivotal role in the development and global expansion of brands including Off-White c/o Virgil Abloh. In March 2020, through Antonioli Group, he acquired the Antwerp-based fashion brand Ann Demeulemeester., with the aim of repositioning it as a high-end brand within the luxury segment, while preserving the poetic and radical identity that has defined its legacy. The relaunch began with the Autumn/Winter 2021–2022 collection, marking the beginning of a new chapter for the house.

In June 2021, he launched 44 Label Group, a fashion project rooted in Berlin’s techno culture and a natural bridge between music, nightlife and design. He collaborated with German DJ Max Kobosil. His vision extends beyond fashion. He also founded VOLT, a nightclub in Milan. A venue dedicated to contemporary electronic music and experimentation, which quickly became a reference point for the international scene while strengthening the dialogue between fashion and nightlife culture. In 2023, he further expanded his universe with the restaurant Sogni, a hospitality concept combining reinterpreted Mediterranean cuisine, a curated music selection and immersive interior design. These lifestyle ventures quickly became key destinations for a sophisticated and cosmopolitan clientele seeking quality across the worlds of fashion, art, entertainment and finance.

Claudio Antonioli is also the founder of Oasi Muso, a project dedicated to the protection and rehabilitation of animals in need. Born from a personal sensitivity and a concrete commitment to the local community, Oasi Muso is actively involved in the rescue, care and promotion of responsible adoption, supporting specialised organisations and facilities. The initiative reflects an entrepreneurial vision that integrates social responsibility and tangible impact, extending the group’s values beyond the strictly commercial sphere. Oasi Muso is a also the name of a newly opened veterinary clinic based in Milan.
