= 1992 Formula One Indoor Trophy =

The 1992 Formula One Indoor Trophy took place on December 7–8 at the Bologna Motor Show. The winner was Johnny Herbert in a Lotus-Judd.

== Participants ==
The 1992 Formula One Indoor Trophy, at the end of the 1992 Formula One season, was entered by just 5 competitors, one down on the previous year.

Johnny Herbert represented Lotus, as he had in 1991, continuing the role he had carried out during the season alongside Mika Häkkinen.

BMS Scuderia Italia, using their Dallara chassis, were represented once again by JJ Lehto, who had also driven for them during the regular season alongside Pierluigi Martini. Michele Alboreto also drove for them, and he would appear in the 1993 season for the team.

The field was completed by a pair of Minardis, driven by Christian Fittipaldi and Alessandro Zanardi. The pair had shared one of Minardi's cars during 1992, with former champion Gianni Morbidelli in the other, but Morbidelli was not selected for the event.

Driver	Team
(Italy) Michele Alboreto	BMS Dallara-Ferrari
(Brazil) Christian Fittipaldi	Minardi-Lamborghini
(United Kingdom) Johnny Herbert	Lotus-Judd
(Finland) JJ Lehto	BMS Dallara-Ferrari
(Italy) Alessandro Zanardi	Minardi-Lamborghini

== Results ==
Christian Fittipaldi received a bye to the semi-finals. In the quarters, Lehto was drawn against Zanardi while Herbert faced Alboreto. Lehto beat Zanardi in a close match-up, and Herbert won through against Alboreto in an equally close pairing. As the closest loser, Zanardi also went through to the semi-finals.

He was drawn against Herbert, but lost again, leaving Lehto to beat Fittipaldi in the other semi-final, eliminating both Minardis. Herbert defeated Lehto in the final, becoming the first person to win the event in a non-Italian car.

Quarter-finals
(Finland)	JJ Lehto
(Italy)	Alessandro Zanardi
(United Kingdom)	Johnny Herbert
(Italy)	Michele Alboreto

Semi-finals
(Brazil)	Christian Fittipaldi
(Finland)	JJ Lehto
(United Kingdom)	Johnny Herbert
(Italy)	Alessandro Zanardi

Final
(Finland)	JJ Lehto
(United Kingdom)	Johnny Herbert
