= Luis Pérez-Sala =

Spanish racing driver (born 1959)

- Born: Luis Pérez-Sala Valls-Taberner; 15 May 1959 (age 67); Barcelona, Spain
- Relatives: Daniel Juncadella (nephew)

Formula One World Championship career
- Nationality: (Spain) Spanish
- Active years: 1988–1989
- Team: Minardi
- Entries: 32 (26 starts)
- Career points: 1
- First entry: 1988 Brazilian Grand Prix
- Last entry: 1989 Australian Grand Prix

Luis Pérez-Sala Valls-Taberner (born 15 May 1959) is a Spanish retired racing driver who competed in Formula One, Formula 3, Formula 3000 and Touring Cars. He was also the team principal of HRT Formula 1 Team during the 2012 F1 season.

== Career ==
Pérez-Sala started his racing career in karting before graduating to racing production-based cars in the early 1980s, initially competing in Renault 5s before competing internationally in the Alfa Romeo Alfasud Sprint Cup in 1983. He competed in the 1984 FIA European Formula 3 Championship in a Ralt-Alfa Romeo, steadily improving across the season and taking a second place at Knutstorp and a fifth at Jarama to place tenth in the season standings. In 1985, he switched to the Italian Formula 3 Championship, finishing seventh overall and scoring a win. The following year, he moved to Formula 3000 with great success, winning races at Birmingham and Enna in 1986 and finishing fourth in that year's championship. He remained in F3000 for the following year, joining the factory Lola team, taking wins at Donington Park and the Le Mans Bugatti Circuit and finishing as runner-up to Stefano Modena in the championship. He became famous for his arguments with Alfonso de Vinuesa, caused by political views: the pair were involved in a spectacular crash in the F3000 race at Spa-Francorchamps in 1987.

The Minardi Formula One team signed Pérez-Sala for the 1988 season, alongside compatriot Adrián Campos - the first time two Spanish drivers had raced together as team-mates in F1. He made his debut for them on 3 April 1988, at the season's opening race in Brazil, where he qualified 20th but failed to finish the race when his rear wing collapsed. Over the next five rounds, he continually outpaced Campos, who was replaced by Pierluigi Martini (Pérez-Sala's F3000 team-mate in 1986) from round six of the Championship in Detroit.

Martini and Pérez-Sala were teammates in both 1988 and 1989, with Martini outqualifying, outracing and outscoring Pérez-Sala. Pérez-Sala's only point came from a sixth place in the 1989 British Grand Prix. This was the first F1 points score by a Spanish driver in thirty years, and the first race in Minardi's history in which both of the team's cars finished in the points. Along with the two points Martini scored for finishing fifth in the same race, the pair scored enough points to keep Minardi out of pre-qualifying for the rest of the season. At the end of the 1989 season, after failing to qualify for the season ending Australian Grand Prix (while Martini qualified a brilliant third behind only the McLaren-Honda cars of Ayrton Senna and Alain Prost), he left Formula One having started 26 of the 32 Grands Prix that he entered. After his retirement from Formula One, Pérez-Sala became a regular in the Spanish Touring Car Championship, winning the series in 1991 and 1993, before moving into sportscar and endurance racing. He and team-mate Manel Cerqueda won the GTB class title in the Spanish GT Championship in 2003 and 2004, and finished second overall in the championship in 2008 - his last season in competition before retiring.

Since 1990, Pérez-Sala has worked as a commentator and analyst for a number of media outlets, including RTVE, El País and TV3. In addition he is an instructor for racing drivers, and is involved in the Joves Pilots del Circuit de Catalunya programme, an initiative backed by the Generalitat de Catalunya, the Circuit de Barcelona-Catalunya and the motorsport authorities in Catalonia whose graduates include Jaime Alguersuari, Miguel Molina, Dani Clos, Albert Costa and Miki Monrás.

In July 2011, Pérez-Sala was recruited as a consultant for the Hispania F1 team, which was founded by former Minardi teammate Campos. On 15 December 2011, it was announced that he would become team principal of HRT, replacing Colin Kolles.

== Personal life ==
Pérez-Sala's nephew, Daniel Juncadella, is also a racing driver, best known for winning the Macau Grand Prix and Spa 24 Hours.

== Racing record ==
=== Complete International Formula 3000 results ===
(key) (Races in bold indicate pole position; races in italics indicate fastest lap.)

Year	Entrant	1	2	3	4	5	6	7	8	9	10	11	Pos.	Pts
1986	Pavesi Racing	SIL; 12	VAL; Ret	PAU; 5	SPA; 4	IMO; 5	MUG; DNQ	PER; 1	ÖST; 5	BIR; 1	BUG; 5	JAR; 8	4th	24.5
1987	Lola Motorsport	SIL; Ret	VAL; 2	SPA; 18	PAU; Ret	**DON**; 1	PER; Ret	BRH; 9	BIR; 4	IMO; 3	**BUG**; 1	JAR; 5	**2nd**	**33**

=== Complete Formula One results ===
(key)

Year	Team	Chassis	Engine	1	2	3	4	5	6	7	8	9	10	11	12	13	14	15	16	WDC	Points
1988	Lois Minardi Team	Minardi M188	Cosworth DFZ V8	BRA; Ret	SMR; 11	MON; Ret	MEX; 11	CAN; 13	DET; Ret	FRA; NC	GBR; Ret	GER; DNQ	HUN; 10	BEL; DNQ	ITA; Ret	POR; 8	ESP; 12	JPN; 15	AUS; Ret	NC	0
1989	Lois Minardi Team	Minardi M188B	Cosworth DFR V8	BRA; Ret	SMR; Ret	MON; Ret														28th	1
1989	Lois Minardi Team	Minardi M189	Cosworth DFR V8				MEX; DNQ	USA; Ret	CAN; Ret	FRA; DNQ	GBR; 6	GER; DNQ	HUN; Ret	BEL; 15	ITA; 8	POR; 12	ESP; Ret	JPN; Ret	AUS; DNQ	28th	1

=== Complete Spanish Touring Car Championship results ===
(key) (Races in bold indicate pole position; races in italics indicate fastest lap.)

Year	Team	Car	1	2	3	4	5	6	7	8	9	10	11	12	13	14	15	16	17	18	19	20	DC	pts
1993	Team Repsol Nissan	Nissan Skyline	ALB; 1	BAR; 1	JER; 4	JAR; 6	BAR; 2	BAR; 3	ALC; 1	ALB; 2	BAR; 1	JAR; 6	JER; 3										1st	134
1994	Team Repsol Nissan	Nissan Primera	JAR; 5	ALB; 3	CAL; 3	ALB; 3	BAR; Ret	JER; 2	BAR; 2	ALC	JAR; Ret	JER; Ret											5th	74
1995	Team Repsol Nissan	Nissan Primera	JER; 1; 7	JER; 2; 5	JAR; 1; 4	JAR; 2; 9	BAR; 1 DNS	BAR; 2 DNS	EST; 1; 8	EST; 2; 6	ALB; 1; 1	ALB; 2 Ret	**CAL**; **1**; 2	CAL; 2; 1	ALB; 1; 5	ALB; 2; 4	**JER**; **1**; 7	JER; 2; 6	BAR; 1 DNS	BAR; 2 DNS	JAR; 1; 2	JAR; 2; 2	6th	144
1996	Team Repsol Nissan	Nissan Primera	JAR; 1; 8	JAR; 2 DNS	ALB; 1; 2	ALB; 2; 4	BAR; 1; 3	BAR; 2; 6	EST; 1; 5	EST; 2; 5	**CAL**; **1**; 1	CAL; 2; 1	JER; 1; 5	JER; 2; 3	**JAR**; **1**; 6	JAR; 2; 7	BAR; 1; 6	BAR; 2; 4					**3rd**	**153**

Sporting positions
Preceded by Inaugural	Formula One Indoor Trophy; Winner; 1988–1989	Succeeded by Gianni Morbidelli
