= Erna Wazinski =

German armorer worker

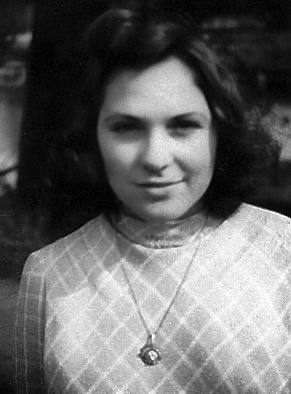
Erna Wazinski (c. 1944)

Erna Gertrude Wazinski (born September 7, 1925, in Ihlow (Oberbarnim); died November 23, 1944, in Wolfenbüttel) was a German armorer worker. She was denounced by a neighbor at the age of 19 for alleged looting after the bombing of Braunschweig and sentenced to death as a "public enemy" by the Special Court of Braunschweig on the basis of the Ordinance Against Public Enemies, (VVO), issued on September 5, 1939.

Wazinski, who had confessed only after being mistreated by criminal investigators and for whom two pardons for clemency had previously been filed, died under the guillotine in Wolfenbüttel Prison. The case came back before German courts several times over a period of 40 years after the war. In 1952, a court mitigated the old sentence; in 1991, an acquittal was issued on the basis of new testimony. After the law called Gesetz zur Aufhebung nationalsozialistischer Unrechtsurteile in der Strafrechtspflege came into force on September 1, 1998, all sentences under the Ordinance Against Public Enemies were sweepingly repealed.

The almost completely preserved trial files are now in the Wolfenbüttel Department.

== Life ==
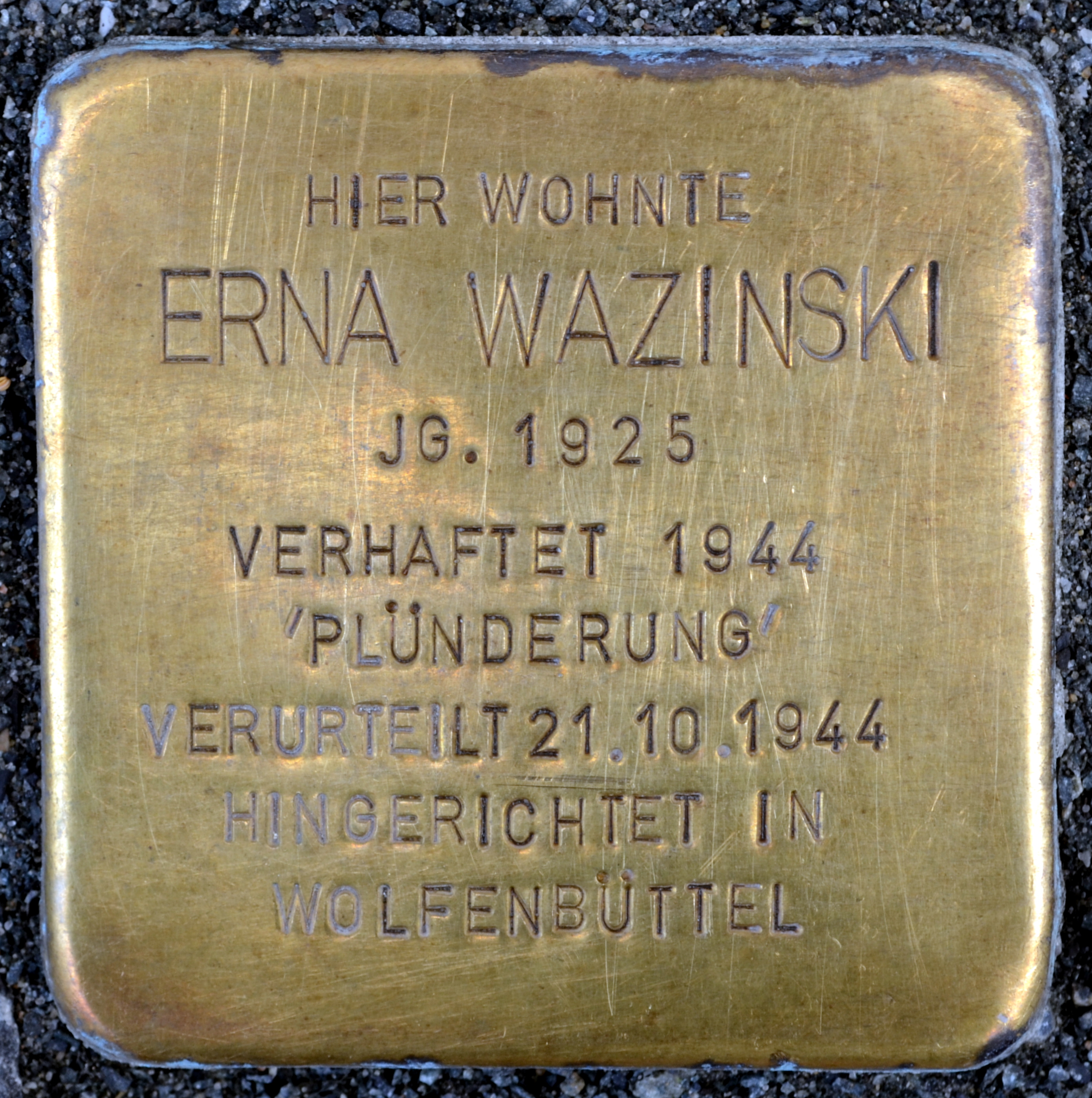
Stolperstein for Erna Wazinski, laid in front of her last residence, Langedammstraße 14, on May 7, 2012.

Wazinski was the only child of Wilhelmine Wazinski, née Chmielewski and Schmielewski, respectively, and her later husband, the invalid Rudolph Wazinski. Her parents were both born in East Prussia and worked as farm laborers on Brandenburg properties around 1925. Her father, 24 years older than her mother, did not marry her until after the family moved to Essen in the Ruhr region in 1930. In 1931, the family moved to Braunschweig, where they lived in very modest conditions in Lange Straße, in a poor people's quarter in the Neustadt. During the redevelopment of this old residential area starting in 1936, many of the small and winding half-timbered houses were demolished. The family then moved to the Magniviertel. The new apartment was at Langedammstraße 14, again in an old half-timbered house. Only a little later, on February 16, 1938, Rudolph Wazinski died when Erna was not yet 13 years old. From the age of 12, Erna was a member of the Jungmädelbund, but subsequently did not join the BDM. She was confirmed in the Petrikirche at Easter 1940.

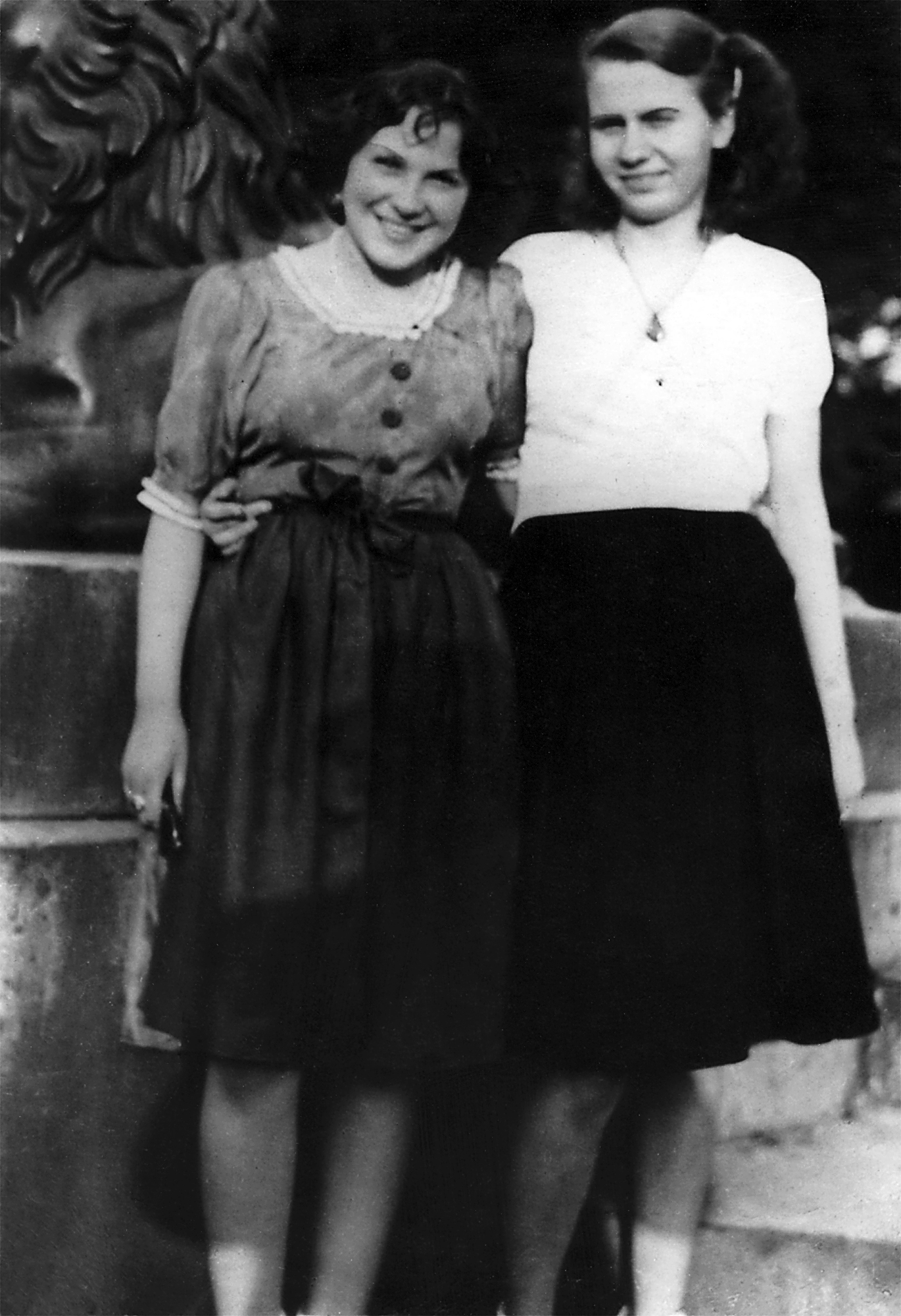
Erna Wazinski (left) with a friend on the Löwenwall

At first, she probably attended the girls' school at Südklint near Lange Straße and later, after moving to the Magniviertel, the Axel-Schaffeld school (today Georg-Eckert school), until the regular end of her schooling in 1939. Afterwards, she stayed at home for some time and then had various jobs. Among others, she worked for Otto Block, who ran a lunch counter on the first floor of the residential building at Langedammstraße 14, for some time from 1942. Block had several criminal records, which prompted the Jugendamt of the city of Braunschweig to place Wazinski in youth welfare education by committing her to a residential child care community at the age of 17. In August 1942, she was sent to Wunstorf, where a newly established reception and observation home had just been opened. After Wazinski had been classified by psychiatrists there as being at "normal risk," she was transferred to the Birkenhof, a Protestant home in Hanover for girls who had been released from school, where she had to stay for about a year.

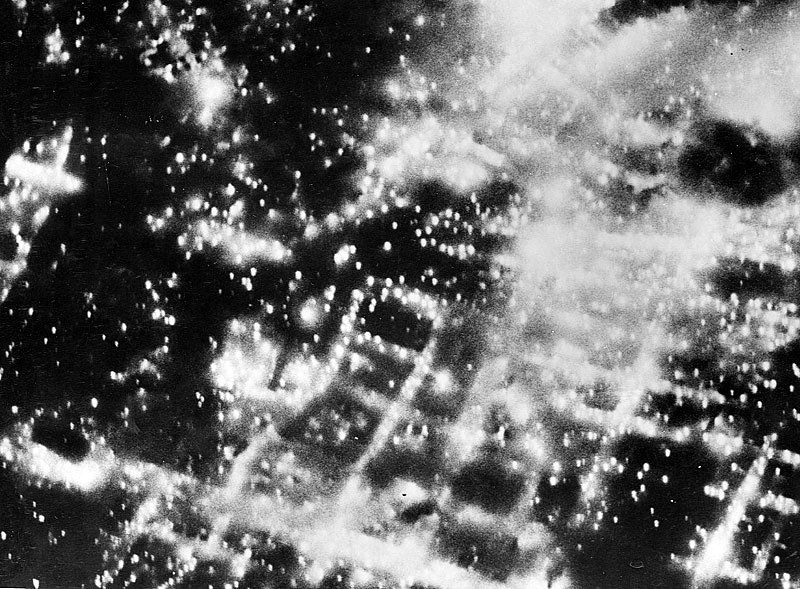
Braunschweig between 2 a.m. and 3 a.m. on October 15, 1944 - at this time Erna Wazinski had to walk home through the burning city

After her return to Braunschweig in November 1943, the employment office found Wasinski a job as a housekeeper. In July 1944, she was then assigned a job at the armaments company VIGA. The subsidiary of Brunsviga-Werke, located at Hamburger Straße 250, produced precision mechanical parts for weapons and was classified as essential to the war effort. She worked here until her arrest on October 20, 1944.

=== The act ===
On the night of Sunday, October 15, 1944, Wazinski was working the night shift. At about 1:50 a.m. there was an air raid alarm and shortly thereafter the Royal Air Force flew a bombing of Braunschweig, causing a firestorm and destroying 90% of the city center, including the Magniviertel. Within just under 40 minutes, about 12,000 high explosive bombs and 200,000 phosphorus and incendiary bombs were dropped. The fires did not go out for two and a half days. Together with her colleague and friend Gerda Körner, Wazinski walked several kilometers from Hamburg Straße to the Magniviertel to look for her mother while the city center burned down. Around 4 o'clock they arrived at the destroyed house. It was the fourth time that mother and daughter Wazinski had been bombed out, losing most of their belongings. She could not find her mother, but assumed she was safe with neighbors. It later turned out that Wilhelmine Wazinski had survived in the cellar of the house diagonally across the street, Langedammstraße 8.

Wazinski spent the night with her friend who lived at Friedrich-Wilhelm-Strasse 1. On the morning of October 16, with the city still burning, she and her friend, Günter Wiedehöft, a soldier on furlough, went into the ruins of the apartment building to find personal belongings, if possible. After they had spent about two hours clearing rubble out of the way, Wazinski recovered two suitcases, a rucksack, and some clothes of which it was not clear to whom they belonged. The total value of the lost property was about 200 Reichsmarks. Wazinski assumed that it was her mother's property, as she stated to her boyfriend; a mistake, as it later turned out. Martha F. or Marina Fränke, a neighbor from the house at Langedammstraße 8, filed a complaint against unknown persons on October 18, because some objects had been stolen from her. She gave Wazinski as the suspect. According to the historians Ludewig/Kuessner, the reason for the accusation was that the SS member F., an acquaintance of the neighbor, had been stalking Wazinski, which is why the neighbor was "not well disposed" to the accused.

=== Arrest ===
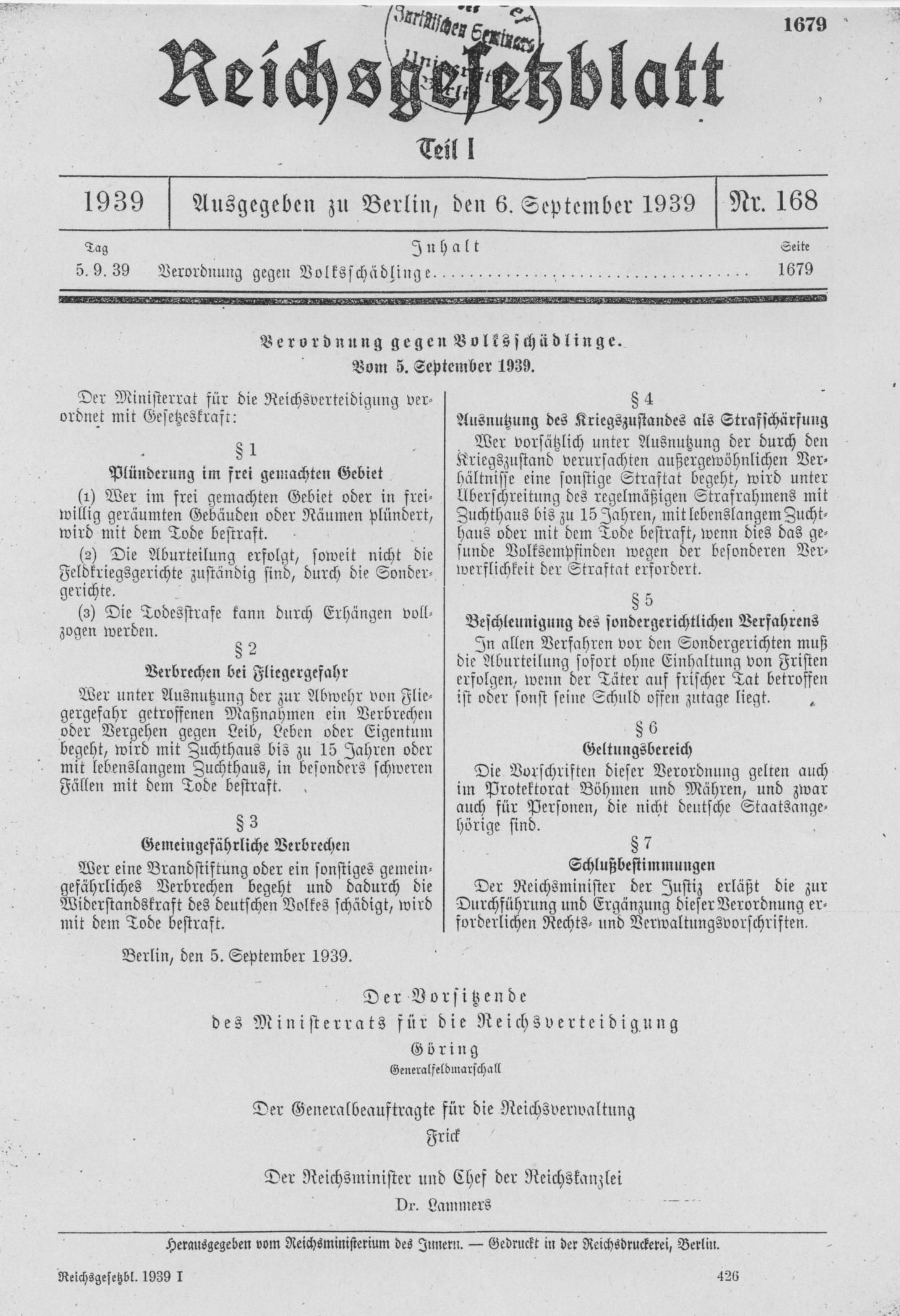
Page 1679 from the Reichsgesetzblatt I with the "Ordinance Against Public Enemies" of September 5, 1939

On Friday, October 20, Wazinski's boyfriend wanted to visit her in her emergency shelter with the Körner family at Friedrich-Wilhelm-Straße 1, but did not meet her because she was still at work. While he was waiting, two detectives appeared who also wanted to visit Wazinski because of the "complaint against unknown persons" of October 18. While they waited together, Günter Wiedehöft was interrogated informally about his girlfriend, describing in detail what had happened, including the joint rescue operation. When Wazinski arrived, he had to leave the room and wait outside the door in the corridor while the police officers talked to her. After a short time Wiedehöft heard the loud voices of the policemen, including the word "Volksverräterin" several times, as well as loud clapping of blows. When all three left the room and Wazinski was led away, Wiedehöft saw that she had apparently received blows to her face; her lips were swollen and her nose was bleeding.

One of the officers told Wiedehöft on his way out that he should "vamoose" to the front as quickly as possible. Since the 20-year-old soldier now also felt threatened himself, he turned to the father of an acquaintance who worked for the Gestapo and asked for help. The latter promised to "keep him out of this," but he could do nothing "for the criminal." Wiedehöft then reported back to his unit on October 23 and was sent to the Eastern Front. He did not return from captivity until September 20, 1949.

=== Confession ===
A short time later it turned out that Wazinski had made a confession during the time she was alone in the room with the two policemen, on which the indictment was based the following day. The content of this forced "confession" differed in essential points from the actual events of October 16, 1944, and almost coincided with the neighbor's report. According to it, the accused had admitted to having opened a suitcase in an undestroyed outbuilding, into which the neighbor had brought some objects from her property to safety, and to having taken the described parts from it. Wazinski concealed the fact that her boyfriend had been present during the recovery. Nor was his presence in Friedrich-Wilhelm-Strasse during the interrogation of the criminal investigators or the statements he had previously made about the matter mentioned in the police record.

=== Indictment ===
A few hours later, on Saturday, October 21, Chief Public Prosecutor Wilhelm Hirte drew up a terse indictment based on the "confession" of the previous day. In it, Wazinski was charged with plunder under § 1 of the VVO and requested the death penalty. The presiding judge of the special court, Walter Lerche, convened the trial for the same day, although there were still older unheard cases; the reason for the expedited hearing of her case is unknown. Walter Ahrens and Ernst von Griesbach also sat on the bench. Christian von Campe was the public defender for the defendant Wazinski.

=== Trial and conviction ===
Since the special court building in Münzstraße had been badly damaged by the bombing on October 15, the trial took place in Rennelberg Prison, where Wazinski was incarcerated. Less than 19 hours after her arrest, the trial against the defendant, who had no criminal record, was opened. The representative of the prosecution, public prosecutor Horst Magnus, demanded the death penalty on the basis of the indictment.

The judges of the Special Court of Braunschweig had various options for legally evaluating Wazinski's alleged act: under normal criminal law, it could have been assessed as simple theft and, given the negligible value of the stolen items, punishable by a fine or a small prison sentence. However, they decided to recognize the much statutory offense of looting, according to § 1 of the Ordinance Against Public Enemies (VVO), which, according to VVO, was punishable by death due to the severity of the act. The prerequisite for the death sentence was proof beyond doubt that both the act itself was sufficiently serious and that the perpetrator was to be classified as a "public enemy" in terms of his personality.

Even the Reichsgericht had urged judges to be particularly cautious in applying the VVO to adolescents and young adults. Despite the indictment, which portrayed the young woman as a "public enemy" Chairman Lerche was pleasantly surprised by the defendant, noting that she gave the "impression of a harmless, orderly, young girl." Wazinski's outward appearance thus did not seem to fit the indictment and the demand for the death penalty at all. The president of the district court, Hugo Kalweit, who was present in the courtroom during the trial, told defence counsel von Campe during a break in the proceedings before the verdict was pronounced that this was not a case in which the death penalty would have to be imposed. He immediately added that, nevertheless, a sentence other than death was probably not to be expected.

Although there were exculpatory witnesses for the defense, defense counsel did not call them. He made no motions and instead of pleading for a closing argument in view of the factual situation, he placed the sentence in the "discretion of the court." Based on the "confession," which was not challenged by any side of the trial, the death sentence was finally handed down. The court considered the act to be particularly reprehensible and justified it as follows:

"... Whoever so selfishly takes advantage of the gravest need of his fellow citizens, acts so reprehensibly and meanly, that he must be subject to the death penalty which is exclusively provided for people pests of this kind according to § 1 of the People Pests Ordinance of 5.9.1939. Even the youth of the accused cannot change this ..." - From the reasons for the verdict of the Special Court of Braunschweig of October 21, 1944. The passage: "Even the youth of the defendants cannot change this." was subsequently added to the verdict in handwriting by the presiding judge, Walter Lerche.

Wazinski's defense attorney showed no reaction in the interest of his client immediately after the verdict was announced. The latter, in turn, reacted with amazement to her death sentence. When asked by the presiding judge, Walter Lerche, if she still had anything to say, she replied, "What am I doing with my mother? After all, I have to feed my mother."

No special court verdict has occupied the Braunschweig judiciary more and for longer in the postwar period than the death sentence against Wazinski, which was exceptionally harsh even according to the jurisprudence of the time and was apparently used by the special court to make an example. Of 56 complaints filed with the Special Court of Braunschweig after the bombing of October 15, 1944, including 28 cases of looting alone, some of which were considerably more serious, charges were brought in only 16 cases, but only in the Wazinski case for looting. There was also only one death sentence in total - that against Wazinski.

=== Investigation after death sentence issued ===
After the death sentence had been passed on Saturday, the presiding judge Lerche surprisingly demanded at the beginning of the week that the public prosecutor's office make subsequent investigations into Wazinski's personal environment as well as her living circumstances - a measure that normally takes place before a conviction. The prosecutor in charge of the "clemency investigations", Magnus, who had called for the death penalty the previous Saturday, came across positive statements about the person of the convicted woman during his investigations, but these were interpreted by Chief Public Prosecutor Hirte to her disadvantage, since she was known to two women who had criminal records for abortions. Magnus closed his investigation two days later and claimed in an interview as late as 1989 that he had been unable to find anything exculpatory.

Colleagues at the armaments company VIGA considered the verdict "too harsh." The company management, meanwhile, painted a negative picture and wrote that she had often been absent from work without excuse. However, the director of the Braunschweig Youth Welfare Office, Evers, gave her by far the most negative report on October 26. Among other things, he wrote that she "... gave the impression of a certain precocious even as a schoolchild ...", "... efforts to place her in regular employment were resisted by her ...", and finally that she had begun working for Mr. B. (the operator of the lunch counter), who had "a reputation as a pimp and an impostor". Evers went on to say that "Erna [...] became more and more prostitute in appearance ...". Evers also referred to a psychiatric report from 1943, according to which Wazinski was "on the whole still immature with considerable psychopathic traits." Despite this expert opinion, Evers fully affirmed her ability to understand her actions. The conclusion was the passage: "Erna Wazinski was a weak-willed, impulsive, frivolous girl, whom even the present time of need does not seem to have brought to a stronger sense of responsibility."

Wazinski herself was interrogated again on October 25, during which she mentioned for the first time that she was engaged. However, she refused to give the name of her fiancé, and Magnus did not ask about it or ask any other questions on the subject. The mother was also questioned, but made unfavorable statements in view of her daughter's situation, which were interpreted by the special court to the convict's disadvantage.

=== Plea ===
After the verdict, Wazinski's lawyer filed a petition for clemency on Tuesday, October 24, writing, among other things:

"... It must be taken into account that the defendant, who had just turned 19, was working the night shift at the Viga Works on the night of October 15, 1944, and did not get out of the air-raid shelter of the works until 4 o'clock in the morning, and then hurried through the burning city to her mother's apartment. The impression of the burning city must have had a heavy effect on the young human child, with special regard to the defendant's concern for her sick mother in the apartment on Langedammstraße. When the defendant came to Langedammstraße, she had to find out that the apartment was completely destroyed. She could not find her mother. Nor, as she credibly asserts, did she find her mother on Monday, October 16, 1944. The mental pressure must have had a very heavy effect on the defendant, who was not very strong, so that on October 16, 1944 she was really in a state comparable to that in which the free determination of will is excluded. I am convinced that it is not justifiable to extinguish the life of a young person for the sake of taking objects of very little value. ..." - Plea for clemency by defense counsel von Campe, October 24, 1944

The convict herself also sent a plea for clemency to the special court on that day. She wrote, among other things:

"... I lost my father very early and live alone with my mother, who has a severe heart condition ... Due to terrorist attacks on Braunschweig, we have already been bombed out three times and out of desperation it has come to this act. I am 19 years old and I acted without thinking. Since this is my first punishment, it hits me very hard. Once again, I deeply regret my deed and ask for some understanding for my difficult situation. Erna Wazinski" - Request for plea by Erna Wazinski, October 24, 1944

Chief Public Prosecutor Hirte rejected the plea two days later on the grounds:

"... Erna Wazinski from Braunschweig has been sentenced to death for looting - §1 of the People's Pest Ordinance - by the verdict of the special court of October 21. [...] There are no reservations about the verdict. [...] Finally, it is characteristic of the condemned that she joined the milling cutter Gerda Körner at her last place of work. [...] The latter has a criminal record for labor fraud and abortion, and is known from other cases for her running around with soldiers. The mother Körner, with whom the convict moved after her bombing, had until recently served a prison sentence of several years. Thus, despite her youth, the convict is not a person deserving of leniency." - Statement of October 26, 1944, by Chief Public Prosecutor Hirte on the petition for clemency

=== Execution ===
A few days later, in early November 1944, the Reich Minister of Justice ordered the execution for November 23, 12:00 noon, at Wolfenbüttel Prison. For execution by executioner Friedrich Hehr, Erna Wazinski was transferred from Rennelberg Prison in Braunschweig to the execution site in Wolfenbüttel. There she was allowed to write a last letter to her mother shortly before her execution (see picture).

Prosecutor Magnus, who was present at the execution, also took minutes:

"At 12:07 p.m. the convict was brought before the court in shackles. After ascertaining the personality of the condemned Wazinski, the executioner was given the order to execute the sentence of the Special Court in Braunschweig of October 21, 1944. Thereupon the head of the condemned was separated from the torso by means of a guillotine. The body was then handed over to the municipal police in Wolfenbüttel for burial, since the relatives of the convicts had not expressed any wish for the body to be handed over. The execution lasted 5 seconds from the time of presentation to the completed pronouncement, and 6 seconds from the handover to the executioner to the completed execution." - from the protocol of the execution

Even on the day of the execution, posters were put up in Braunschweig stating that Wazinski had been executed as a public enemy.

A few days later, Wilhelmine Wazinski received notification from Chief Public Prosecutor Hirte that the death sentence had been carried out on her daughter. Erna Wazinski's body was buried by the local police authority on written instructions from Hirte. Two years later, Wazinski's remains were transferred to Braunschweig and reburied there. The grave site no longer exists today.

== Legal aftermath 1952-1991 ==
=== Resumption proceedings 1952 ===
Wilhelmine Wazinski, Erna's mother, had remarried in 1946 and lived in Hamburg. She authorized her acquaintance Otto Block to obtain a review of the special court's verdict by way of retrial at the Regional Court of Braunschweig. On April 5, 1952, the case was tried di novo before the 3rd Criminal Chamber on the basis of a 1947 decree that Nazi sentences should be mitigated to a just sentence in cases of cruel or excessive punishment. During the trial, neither the rule of law of a Nazi special court was questioned nor the details of the conduct of the trial against Wazinski. Again, without questioning (existing) witnesses such as Erna Wazinski's mother or former boyfriend, and based solely on the trial records of the special court, the former death sentence was eventually commuted to a custodial sentence of nine months for theft. This meant that Wazinski was again found guilty, only her sentence was - posthumously - reduced.

=== Attempted retrial 1959 ===
In 1959, Block filed a motion to set aside the verdict of April 5, 1952, on the grounds that the board had at that time adopted the reasoning of the 1944 death sentence as its own. At the same time, Block filed legal proceedings against the owner of the allegedly stolen objects, who had filed the complaint against Unknown in 1944 and had named Wazinski as a suspect, as well as against all the criminal investigators, judges and prosecutors involved. The opening of proceedings for extortion of testimony and perverting the course of justice was rejected by the Chief Public Prosecutor on the grounds that such things had been barred by the statute of limitations since May 7, 1955.

=== Attempted retrial 1960/61 ===
On December 1, 1960, Block again applied for a retrial. After extensive investigations and testimony by witnesses, the application was rejected by the Regional Court in a decision of June 11, 1961. Block's appeal was also rejected by the Criminal Senate of the Braunschweig Court of Appeal (OLG) on June 28, 1962, on the grounds that Wazinski's confession to the police could not be doubted. A second appeal was rejected by the 2nd Criminal Senate of the Federal Court of Justice in October 1962.

=== Reopening 1964 ===
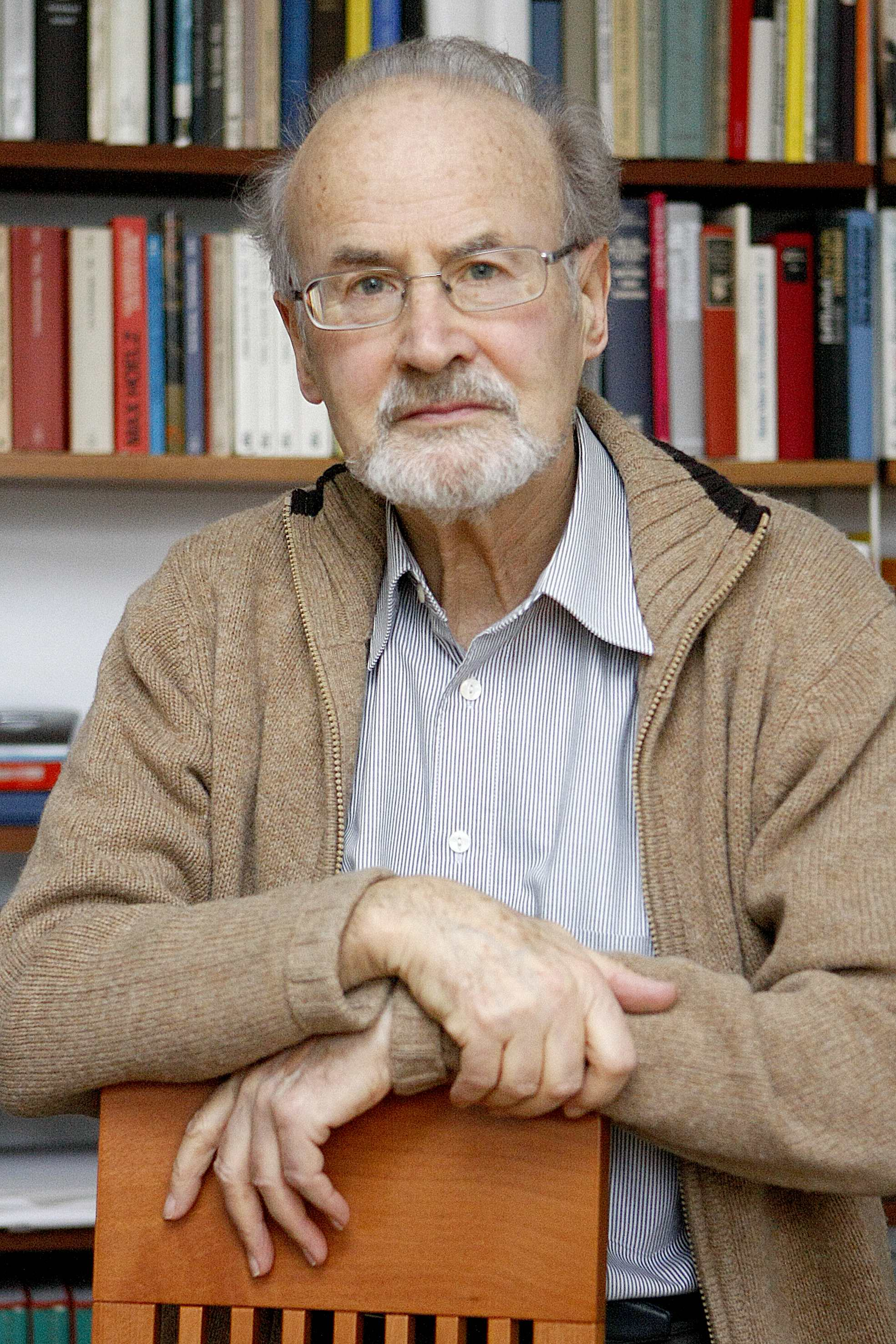
Helmut Kramer, a judge at the Higher Regional Court of Braunschweig, fought for decades for Erna Wazinski's rehabilitation and for Nazi lawyers to be held accountable.

In 1964, Otto Block brought an action for official liability before the Regional Court of Braunschweig. The 3rd Civil Chamber considered the claim for compensation to be justified and subsequently declared on July 29, 1964, that the death sentence had also been an unlawful miscarriage of justice from the perspective of "National Socialist law," "... one of the cruelest sentences [...] irresponsible and inhumane."

The state of Lower Saxony appealed against this decision, whereby, according to the account of the former judge at the Braunschweig Higher Regional Court, Helmut Kramer, with "tremendous legal effort" it refused to pay compensation and rejected a settlement. The 3rd Civil Senate of the Higher Regional Court then decided in April 1965 that a retrial was necessary for compensation. This in turn, however, was rejected by the 3rd Criminal Chamber of the Regional Court on October 7, 1965. From a legal point of view, Wilhelmine Wazinski thus found herself after 13 years back where she had started with her request in 1952.

=== Justification of the death sentence by the Regional Court of Braunschweig in 1965 ===
The 3rd Criminal Chamber justified the death sentence passed in 1944 (file number 12 AR 99/65 [1 Sond. KLs 231/44]). The basis for the 57-page decision was that the 3rd Criminal Chamber was guided exclusively by the legal situation prevailing in 1944 at the time of the sentence. In addition, it found that the Ordinance Against Public Enemies had been binding law in 1944. In the reasons for the judgment, which used Nazi terminology in terms of content, the reporting judge Henning Piper (later a judge at the Federal Court of Justice) pointed out the following: "...In terms of content, the People's Defence Ordinance could not be considered to be law that was per se non-binding because it was immoral and did not bind the judges of 1944. [...] As harsh as the sentence [...] appears, the [special] court, as it looked at the time, [...] had no choice, if the element of plunder was present, but to award the punishment exclusively provided for in § 1 of the People's Pest Ordinance."

=== Attempted retrial 1966 ===
The subsequent appeal against the judgment of October 7, 1965, was rejected by the Criminal Senate of the Higher Regional Court, which included Hans Meier-Branecke and Gerhard Eckels, in January 1966. Another application for reopening in the summer of 1966 was also finally rejected - after it had gone through all instances - on February 27, 1967.

Otto Block, who had conducted all the proceedings up to this point on behalf of Wazinski's ailing mother, despaired at the hopelessness of his efforts and had increasing difficulty distinguishing between Nazi and postwar judges, which eventually led to a conviction for offense. In further criminal proceedings against Block for violation of the Legal Advice Act (dated December 13, 1935), a penalty order was initially issued, but this was again dismissed at the court of cassation.

=== Braunschweig unterm Hakenkreuz ===
All legal remedies seemed to have been exhausted and the case of Erna Wazinski finally shelved. In the spring of 1980, however, the lecture series Braunschweig unterm Hakenkreuz, organized by Helmut Kramer, Pastor Dietrich Kuessner, historian Ernst-August Roloff and others, took place at the Municipal Museum. The aim of the lectures and subsequent discussions was to address the unresolved Nazi past in the middle classes, the judiciary and the church and its aftermath in Braunschweig. One of the topics discussed was the fate of Erna Wazinski and the legal aftermath in post-war Germany. In view of the great interest in the event and the controversial discussions, Kramer published documentation of the lecture series in 1981, as well as writings, newspaper articles, etc. The documentation Braunschweig unterm Hakenkreuz. Bürgertum, Justiz und Kirche - Eine Vortragsreihe und ihr Echo was one of the first local history studies on the Nazi period and Nazi judicial history.

=== Opening memorial and documentation site 1990 ===
In 1990, a memorial and documentation site was opened in the former execution building of Wolfenbüttel Prison, where Wazinski was also killed. At least 750 people had been executed with the guillotine in the building from 1937 to March 1945, among them many people from the French and Belgian resistance.

=== Reopening proceedings 1991 ===
At the end of the 1980s, the journalist Johannes Unger researched the case, for which he interviewed the public prosecutor Horst Magnus, who was present at the execution. The results of his research were incorporated into the NDR 4 Radio documentary "Gnade kann nicht gewährt werden" - Der Fall Erna Wazinski, which was broadcast on October 19, 1989. As a result of this and the reporting in the Braunschweiger Zeitung, several contemporary witnesses came forward, including Günter Wiedehöft, Wazinski's friend at the time. For the first time, Wiedehöft testified publicly that he and Wazinski had searched for belongings in the rubble of the apartment building and that Wazinski had considered what she had found and recovered to be her property or that of her mother.

On the basis of these new findings, Helmut Kramer again applied for a retrial, which ended with an acquittal on March 20, 1991 - but only on the basis of the new witness statements, since, according to the 1991 argumentation, the facts now described were unknown to the special court in 1944. There was no evaluation or condemnation of the work of the jurists of the special court.

== The Case of Erna Wazinski and the Evangelical Lutheran Church of Braunschweig ==
For the Evangelical Lutheran Church in Braunschweig, the case of Erna Wazinski gained special significance through the annulment of the death sentence passed against her - and the publication of the result of the retrial - since Walter Lerche, in 1944 presiding judge of the Special Court of Braunschweig and jointly responsible for the death sentence in the Wazinski case, after his denazification in 1950 first became a member of the legal committee of the regional church, was promoted to Oberlandeskirchenrat in 1951, and later, during the term of office of the 1. General Synod from 1949 to 1954, he became 2nd Vice President of the General Synod of the United Evangelical Lutheran Church of Germany. Although Lerche - as the public only learned decades after his death - was demonstrably involved in 59 death sentences as a judge at the special court, he had managed to rise in the national church to the office of President of the General Synod without his special court past ever being noticed by the general public.

The presiding judge of the 9th Criminal Chamber of the Higher Regional Court of Braunschweig, Gerhard Eckels, at the same time President of the Regional Synod of the Evangelical Lutheran Church in Braunschweig, announced after Wazinski's acquittal, which his chamber had handed down, that in view of Lerche's involvement in the Special Court of Braunschweig, which had not been known up to that time, a historical commission appointed by the church government and headed by the historian Klaus Erich Pollmann would examine Lerche's activities at the Special Court of Braunschweig. The essential question was to find out how it was possible that Lerche, who had been suspended from further judicial office in the postwar period, could reach such a high position in the regional church. The commission was to examine Lerche's activities at the Special Court in Braunschweig.

The first results of the historical commission were presented for discussion during a colloquium in July 1993. In 1994, the final report was published under the title Der Schwierige Weg in die Nachkriegszeit. Die Evangelisch-lutherische Landeskirche in Braunschweig 1945-1950. However, the case of Erna Wazinski was mentioned only in passing in the report, without even hinting at a reference to Lerche and the fact that the case was the trigger for the investigation. Lerche's activity as a special judge was assessed by the commission, on the one hand, as "not negative in any particular way ..., at any rate no more so than all the judges who at that time imposed sentences under the war service regulations ..." According to the commission's report, this is "... an indication that Lerche is not to be regarded as an isolated case, even if the Justiz-Spruchkammer expressed itself in this way in 1946." On the other hand, the commission states: "... under the chairmanship of Dr. Walter Lerche, the special court passed about 54 death sentences ... - death sentences which, for the most part, must be described as judicial murders in accordance with the rule of law. The responsibility for this was borne by Lerche and the special judges involved in these trials ... While this does not relativize the guilt of the special judges, it does establish a complicity on the part of all those instances that were involved in the creation and enforcement of this ordinance [VVO], and all others who did not protest against such inhumane tightening of the criminal law."

== Die braunschweigische Johanna. Ein deutsches Requiem ==
After the case of Erna Wazinski first became known to a broad public in 1980 through the lecture series Braunschweig unterm Hakenkreuz, interest in the (local) historical reappraisal of the Nazi period and judicial history in Braunschweig grew. The retrial and its accompanying circumstances, as well as the appointment of the Historical Commission at the Evangelical Lutheran Church in Braunschweig, finally led to Erna Wazinski's fate also being taken up by journalists, writers and theater producers: Adam Seide adapted her life story in his 1986 novel Die braunschweigische Johanna. Ein deutsches Requiem. The theater version of the work premiered at the Staatstheater Braunschweig on February 20, 1999. In 1989, on the 45th anniversary of Erna Wazinski's death, the feature "Gnade kann nicht gewährt werden" - Der Fall Erna Wazinski, based on the research of a journalist, was broadcast on NDR-4. The following year, the feature was broadcast again in an updated version.

== Bibliography ==
- Ernst Klee: Das Personenlexikon zum Dritten Reich, Frankfurt a. M. 2003, ISBN 3-10-039309-0.
- Wilfried Knauer, Niedersächsisches Justizministerium. In Zusammenarbeit mit der Presse- und Informationsstelle der Niedersächsischen Landesregierung (Hrsg.): Nationalsozialistische Justiz und Todesstrafe. Eine Dokumentation zur Gedenkstätte in der Justizvollzugsanstalt Wolfenbüttel. Steinweg, Braunschweig 1991, ISBN 3-925151-47-8
- Helmut Kramer (Hrsg.): Braunschweig unterm Hakenkreuz. Bürgertum, Justiz und Kirche – Eine Vortragsreihe und ihr Echo, Magni-Buchladen, Braunschweig 1981, ISBN 3-922571-03-4
- Helmut Kramer (Hrsg.): "Die Verordnung gegen Volksschädlinge vom 5.9.1939 war geltendes Gesetz ...", Reader zum Fall Erna Wazinski, ohne Ort und Jahr.
- Hans-Ulrich Ludewig, Dietrich Kuessner: "Es sei also jeder gewarnt" – Das Sondergericht Braunschweig 1933–1945, In: Quellen und Forschungen zur Braunschweigischen Landesgeschichte, Band 36, Selbstverlag des Braunschweigischen Geschichtsvereins, Langenhagen 2000, ISBN 3-928009-17-6
- Niedersächsische Landeszentrale für politische Bildung (Hrsg.): Justiz im Nationalsozialismus. Verbrechen im Namen des Volkes. Katalog zur Ausstellung. Nomos Verlag, Baden-Baden 2002, ISBN 3-7890-8178-7
- Adam Seide: Die braunschweigische Johanna. Ein deutsches Requiem. Roman. Syndikat, Frankfurt am Main 1986, ISBN 3-8108-0243-3, Neuauflage anlässlich der Uraufführung der Theaterfassung im Staatstheater Braunschweig 20 November 1999: Revonnah, Hannover 1999, ISBN 3-934818-25-0 (2., erweiterte Auflage: 2002).
- Bernhild Vögel: Ein kurzer Lebensweg – Der Fall Erna Wazinski. Arbeitsmaterialien für die Bildungsarbeit mit Begleitheft, hrsg. v. Bildungsvereinigung Arbeit und Leben, Braunschweig 2003. ISBN 3-932082-06-0
