= Spengler (surname) =

Spengler is a German-language occupational surname, literally meaning "metal worker" or "tin knocker". It may refer to:

- Alexander Spengler (1827–1901), the first Davos doctor specializing in tuberculosis
- Andreas Spengler (born 1947), German psychiatrist and researcher
- Bruno Spengler (born 1983), a Canadian racecar driver
- Carl Spengler (1860–1937), Swiss physician
- Christine Spengler (born 1945), French war photographer
- Dagmar Spengler (born 1974), German cellist
- Daniel Spengler (born 1966), Swiss handball player
- Egon Spengler, character from the Ghostbusters films
- Pheobe Spengler, character from the Ghostbusters films
- Fritz Spengler (1908–2003), German field handball player
- Hans Spengler (1917–2003), Swiss footballer
- Horst Spengler (born 1950), West German handball player
- Jeronimus Spengler (1589–1635), Swiss glass painter
- John Spengler, the Akira Yamaguchi Professor of Environmental Health and Human Habitation at Harvard T.H. Chan School of Public Health
- Jörg Spengler (1938–2013), German sailor
- Joseph J. Spengler (1912–1991), American economist, statistician and historian of economic thought
- Lazarus Spengler (1479–1534), German Protestant Reformer
- Lorenz Spengler (1720–1807), Swiss-born Danish decorative artist and naturalist
- Lukas Spengler (born 1994), Swiss cyclist
- Oswald Spengler (1880–1936), German author, writer of The Decline of the West
- Pierre Spengler (born 1947), French film producer
- Tilman Spengler (born 1947), German sinologist, writer, and journalist
- Volker Spengler (1939–2020), German actor
- William Spengler (1889–1979), American boxer
- Spengler, pen name of David P. Goldman

== See also ==
- Spengler Cup, an ice hockey tournament in Switzerland
