= Bombing of Celle =

Military actions during WWII

Bombing of Celle during World War II
- Part of Strategic bombing during World War II
Date	1945
Location	Celle
Result	2.2% of the city destroyed, unknown number of deaths

Belligerents
United States	Germany

Strength
2 bombing raids	

The bombing of Celle was a series of American aerial bombing attacks on the city of Celle, Germany, during World War II. A total of two air raids were carried out by United States Army Air Forces in 1945 as part of the Allied campaign of strategic bombing of Germany. However, unlike nearby Hanover, Braunschweig and Bremen, the city itself escaped major damage.

== Background ==
Unlike the nearby industrial hubs of Hanover and Braunschweig, Celle was not seen as a target of opportunity by the Allies until 1945. Before that, air raid alarms regularly went off, but the planes of the Royal Air Force and United States Army Air Forces flew over Celle to target nearby larger cities instead. Before the war began, the city had a total of 37,799 inhabitants in May 1939.

== Attacks ==
Between 1940 and 1944, only very minor incidents took place in Celle. One such incident happened in 1941 when an Allied bomb fell on the old town building on An der Stadtkirche 11, blowing out only the windows as a result. The historic inner city as well as the Celle Castle escaped any major bombings for the time being.

This changed when the Allies carried out Operation Clarion. The plan was to send out 3500 fighter bombers and 1500 fighter jets all over German towns and cities in 9000 different missions on the 22 and 23 February 1945. The purpose of these missions was to destroy important transport hubs, but also to demoralize the civilian population and to persuade them to surrender. On February 22, eight B-24 Liberators of the Eighth Air Force targeted Celle as a target of opportunity. Because of a navigational error however, the original destination of the freight station in the town of Peine was rejected on short notice and the Americans decided to redirect their course to their secondary or alternative target, which became the Celle railway station. Early in the morning, the air raid alarm went off in the city, but since the Allied planes had flown over Celle for years, people paid little attention to it. A total of 94 500 pound General Purpose bombs were dropped on the railway station, damaging it in the process. A train of the Deutsche Reichsbahn which was on its way to the armoured troop school in Bergen-Hohne and carried 117 Hungarian Wehrmacht soldiers was badly hit during the attack. The train happened to be stationed in Celle that day and as a result of the attack, 105 Hungarian and two possibly German soldiers died while another 71 were injured - half of them sustaining serious injuries. The train was also damaged. Two days later and after identification of all the dead, 117 soldiers were buried in Celle's forest cemetery known as the Waldfriedhof after more succumbed to their injuries later on in the war.

After the attack of February 22, 1945, the second and last big attack on Celle happened six weeks later on April 8. Celle was one of the last towns in the Third Reich to be attacked again by the American Ninth Air Force: shortly before 18:00, 132 aircraft dropped 240 tons of high-explosive bombs on the Celle station and its surroundings, badly damaging the train station itself as well as the freight station which was put out of operation until the end of the war due to the tracks being damaged beyond repair. The gas works and 9 businesses were also completely destroyed. The railway bridges near the Bahnhofstraße (then called Hindenburgstraße) and Wiesenstraße collapsed and houses on the streets of Neustadt, Altenhäusen, Kirchstraße, Marienstraße, Uferstraße, Fuhsestraße, Riemannstraße and Bahnhofstraße were hit by bomb splinters and flying debris. The original target were the railway facilities such as the main train station with its bridges and underpasses. However, despite there being a clear view that day, the bombardier of the command aircraft could not recognize the intended targets and thus shifted the focus of the attack further south to the freight station. After about 70 minutes, the attack was over. Directly after the attack, bystanders rushed to help those trapped under the rubble and the Celler fire department (which had gone to Nienhagen to put out fires from a bombing raid earlier that day) rushed back to Celle to put out the fires at the freight station and in the surrounding area's. However, because the Nazi Party, city administration or the Wehrmacht did not coordinate and plan the evacuation and rescue measures, the survivors and bystanders who came to their aid were essentially left to figure these things out themselves. This was especially the case for the residents of the streets west of the railway lines, which were largely cut off from the city center due to the underpasses at the Wiesenstraße and Bahnhofstraße collapsing during the bombing. The ensueing rubble had trapped 20 to 30 people which had sought shelter from the bombs there.

Ultimately, the exact number of deaths from the second air attack on Celle could never be determined. The official administrative report of Celle speaks of around 800 deaths, but these reports only include those who could be identified or who were later reported as missing and comprise primarily of Celler citizens, East German refugees and soldiers who lost their lives in the affected residential areas. The many dead in the area of the freight station, where unsubstantiated bodies and body parts were found after weeks and months, were not counted however. These bodies and body parts were from foreign workers, members of the Wehrmacht and SS and concentration camp prisoners put on transport from Drütte.

== After the war ==
After the unconditional surrender of Nazi Germany, the war also ended for Celle. Celle was spared from serious destruction due to the local administration surrendering without a fight to advancing British troops, who occupied the city on the 12th of April 1945. Because of this, the historical city centre and the castle survived the war completely unscathed. Survivors were taken care of by locals and British forces with food, water and medical care.

== Destruction ==
After the war ended, reconstruction began in the area's that were hit. The few houses that were hit were either rebuilt in its original pre-war state or new houses in the typical 1950s traditionalist style were reconstructed. In total, 67 houses in Celle were completely destroyed, with an additional 550 being significantly damaged and 614 being slightly damaged. The most damage occurred on Marienstraße. In total, 2.2% of the city ended up being destroyed and a total of 18.700 m^{3} of rubble was removed.

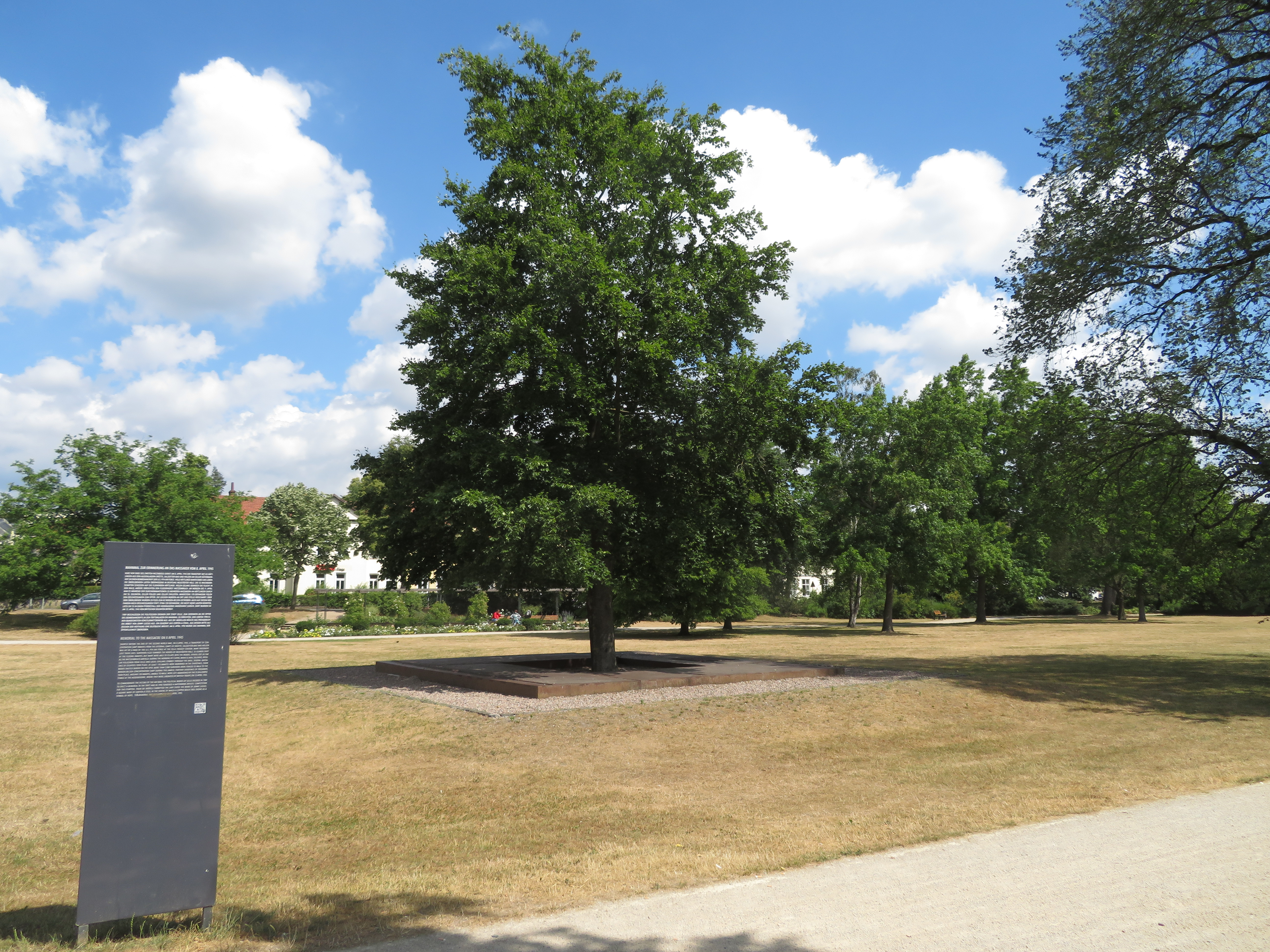
The memorial and copper beech tree in Triftanlagen Park in Celle in 2022.

As a result of the two air raids on Celle, a total of 122 inhabitants died. Besides this death toll however is a large number of prisoners from a concentration camp were killed when an Allied bomb hit the train they were on and was heading from the Salzgitter-Drütte concentration camp to the Bergen-Belsen concentration camp. The train with freight cars contained 2,862 Ukrainian, Russian, Polish, Dutch, and French nationals and had arrived at the Celle freight station the day before. The train stopped at platform 9 at around 16:00 next to an ammunition train. The journey of the train was supposed to continue to Bergen-Belsen at 15:00 after the replacement of locomotives, but this did not happen; at 17:45, the air raid sirens started to sound again and for the first time in the war, flak guns were heard for the first time in Celle. American bombs were dropped on the train, which ended up exploding during the air attack. Some of the wagons were hit directly. The resulting fire destroyed multiple wagons carrying the prisoners and hundreds of prisoners lost their lives as a result. Those who survived, fled either into Celle proper or westward towards the Neudstadt woods while troops of the Waffen SS opened fire on them. As soon as the air raid was over, the SS guards, civilians who were members of the local Nazi party, Gestapo members, the fire-brigade and members of the public went after the fleeing prisoners. The prisoners who were caught and survived were detained on the spot near the Neustadt wood. About 30 prisoners who were suspected of looting were executed on the spot while most of the surviving internees were marched to Bergen-Belsen, with others being detained at the army's Heide barracks. This event would later come to be known as the Celle massacre. On 8 April 1992, a memorial to the massacre was erected in Triftanlagen Park in the form of a copper beech tree. The German word for copper beech means "Blutbuche" (blood beech).

== See also ==
- Strategic bombing during World War II
- Bombing of Hanover in World War II
- Bombing of Braunschweig
