= Wunstorf =

- Town
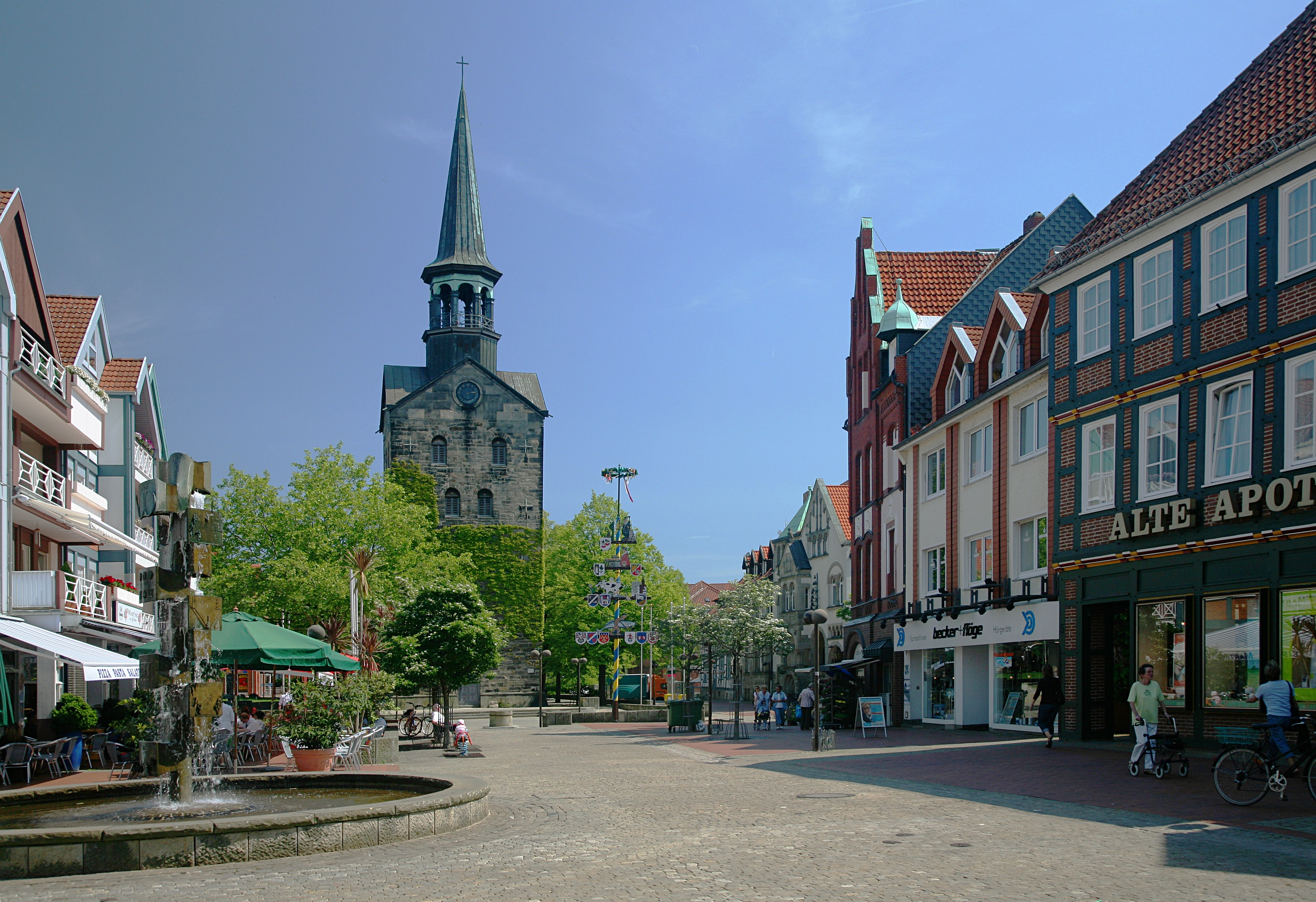
- Pedestrian zone in the town centre of Wunstorf

- Coat of arms

- Location of Wunstorf within Hanover district
- Interactive map of Wunstorf
- Location within Germany Location within Lower Saxony
- Coordinates: 52°25′39″N 9°25′46″E
- Country: Germany
- State: Lower Saxony
- District: Hanover
- Subdivisions: 14 districts

Government
  - Mayor (2021–26): Carsten Piellusch (SPD)

Area
  - Total: 125.74 km^{2} (48.55 sq mi)
- Elevation: 43 m (141 ft)

Population (2025-12-31)
  - Total: 41,126
  - Density: 327.07/km^{2} (847.11/sq mi)
- Time zone: UTC+01:00 (CET)
  - Summer (DST): UTC+02:00 (CEST)
- Postal codes: 31515
- Dialling codes: 05031, 05033 (Steinhude and Großenheidorn), 05723 (Idensen-Niengraben)
- Vehicle registration: H
- Website: www.wunstorf.de

Wunstorf (German pronunciation: [ˈvʊnsˌtɔʁf]) is a town in the district of Hanover, in Lower Saxony, Germany. It is situated approximately 22 kilometres (14 mi) west of Hanover. The following localities belong to the town of Wunstorf: Blumenau (with Liethe), Bokeloh, Großenheidorn, Idensen (with Idensermoor and Niengraben), Klein Heidorn, Kolenfeld, Luthe, Mesmerode, Steinhude, and Wunstorf.

Nearby Wunstorf Air Base of the German Air Force, which participated in the Berlin Airlift and is home to Air Transport Wing 62 since 1978 that operates all German A400Ms, is named after Wunstorf. To the west of the city, Steinhude and Großenheidorn are located on the shores of Lake Steinhude.

== Early history ==
The name Wunstorf derives from the early settlement of Wonherestorpe dating to around 700 CE. In 1181, Wunstorf was mentioned as a civitas, literally 'citizenry' in Latin and 'Bürgerschaft' in German.

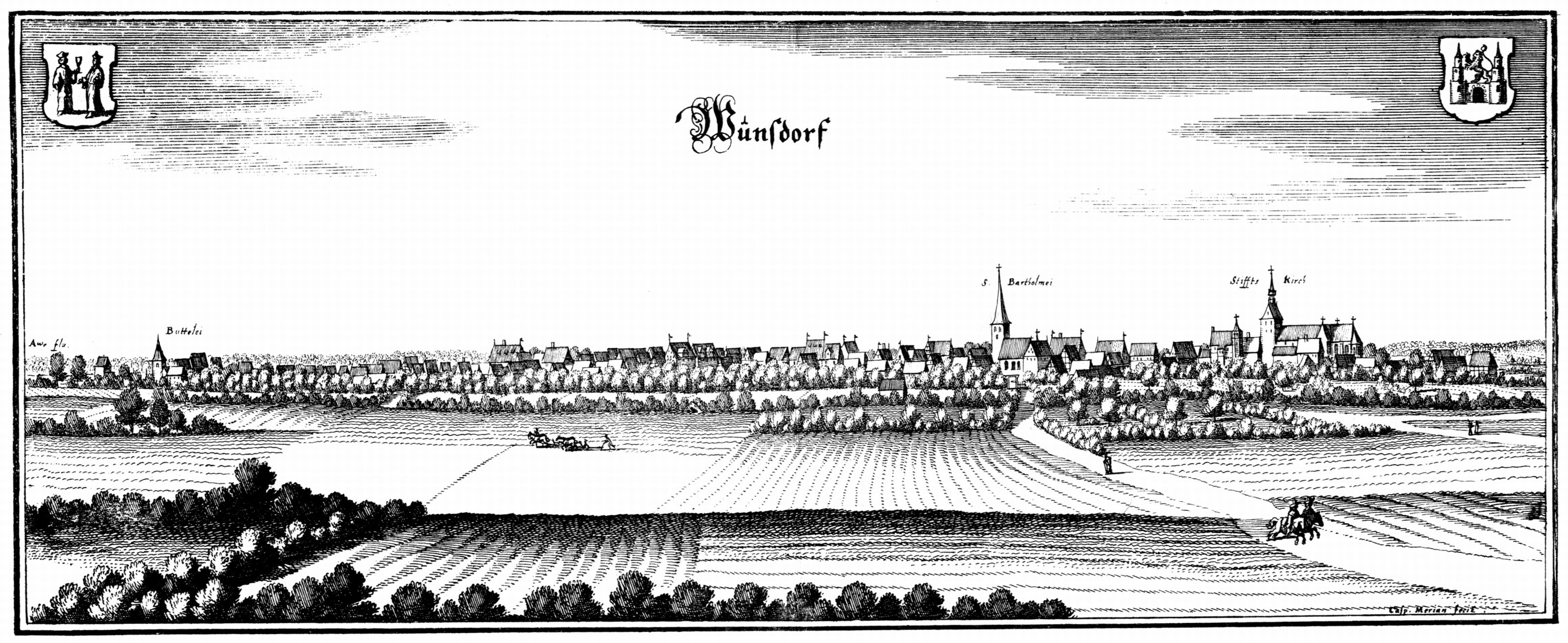
Engraving of Wunstorf by Matthäus Merian, c. 1654

== Population ==
- 1830 – c. 1,910
- 1840 – c. 2,300
- 1871 – 2,455
- 1885 – 2,963
- 1905 – 4,523
- 1949 – 11,610 (of this, 3,490 were refugees and displaced persons)
- 1998 – 40,848
- 2000 – 41,474
- 2005 – 42,215
- 2010 – 41,244

== Local council ==
The local elections on 11 September 2016, had the following results:

- SPD: 16 seats
- CDU: 13 seats
- Alliance '90/The Greens: 6 seats
- FDP: 2 seats
- AfD: 4 seats
- Fraktionslos:(without party) 1 seat

== Transport ==
Wunstorf has two exits on motorway A 2.

Wunstorf railway station has four trains per hour to Hanover (a mix of local and regional trains), and two trains per hour each to Minden and Nienburg. The local bus network is designed to allow connections with trains to and from Hanover.

The nearest commercial airport is the Hannover Airport about 25 kilometres (16 mi) via motorways A 2 and A 352.

== Twin towns – sister cities ==
Wunstorf is twinned with:

- Flers, France
- Wolmirstedt, Germany

== Notable people ==
- Polykarp Leyser IV (1690–1728), Protestant theologian, philosopher, physician, jurist and historian
- Johann Dietrich Busch (1700–1753), an organ builder.
- Joost Schmidt (1893–1948), typographer, painter and teacher at the Bauhaus
- Ernst Jünger (1895–1998), writer, soldier, philosopher and entomologist; went to local school
- Hans Bosse (1938–2023), anthropologist, sociologist and social psychologist; also worked in Papua New Guinea
- Andreas Spengler (born 1947), psychiatrist and psychotherapist, medical director at local hospital
- Heinz-Joachim Barchmann (born 1950), politician (SPD), Member of Bundestag since 2009
- Nicolas-Gerrit Kühn (born 2000), footballer, played about 140 games

== Gallery ==
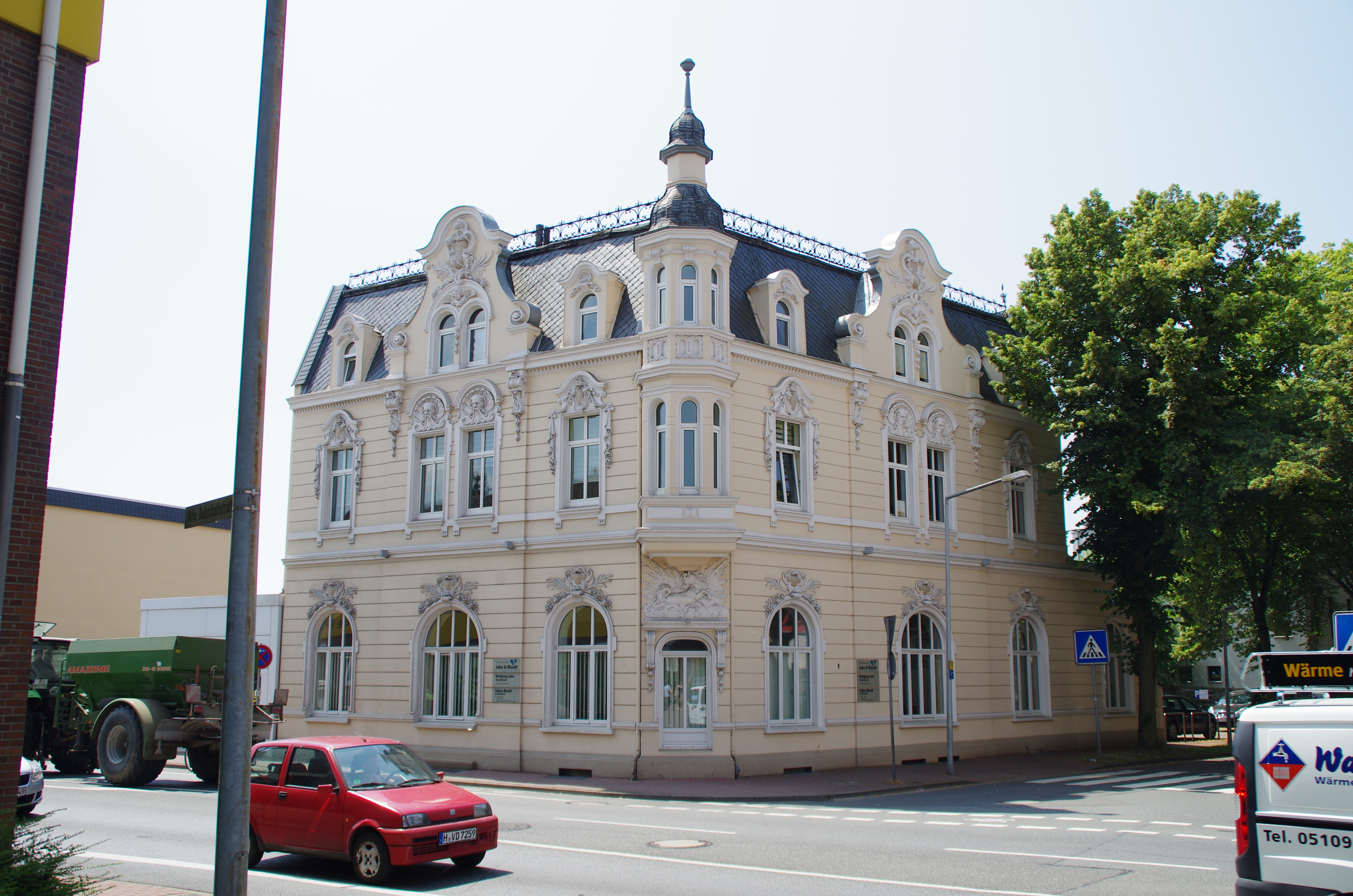
Heritage-protected house at Georgstraße, Wunstorf

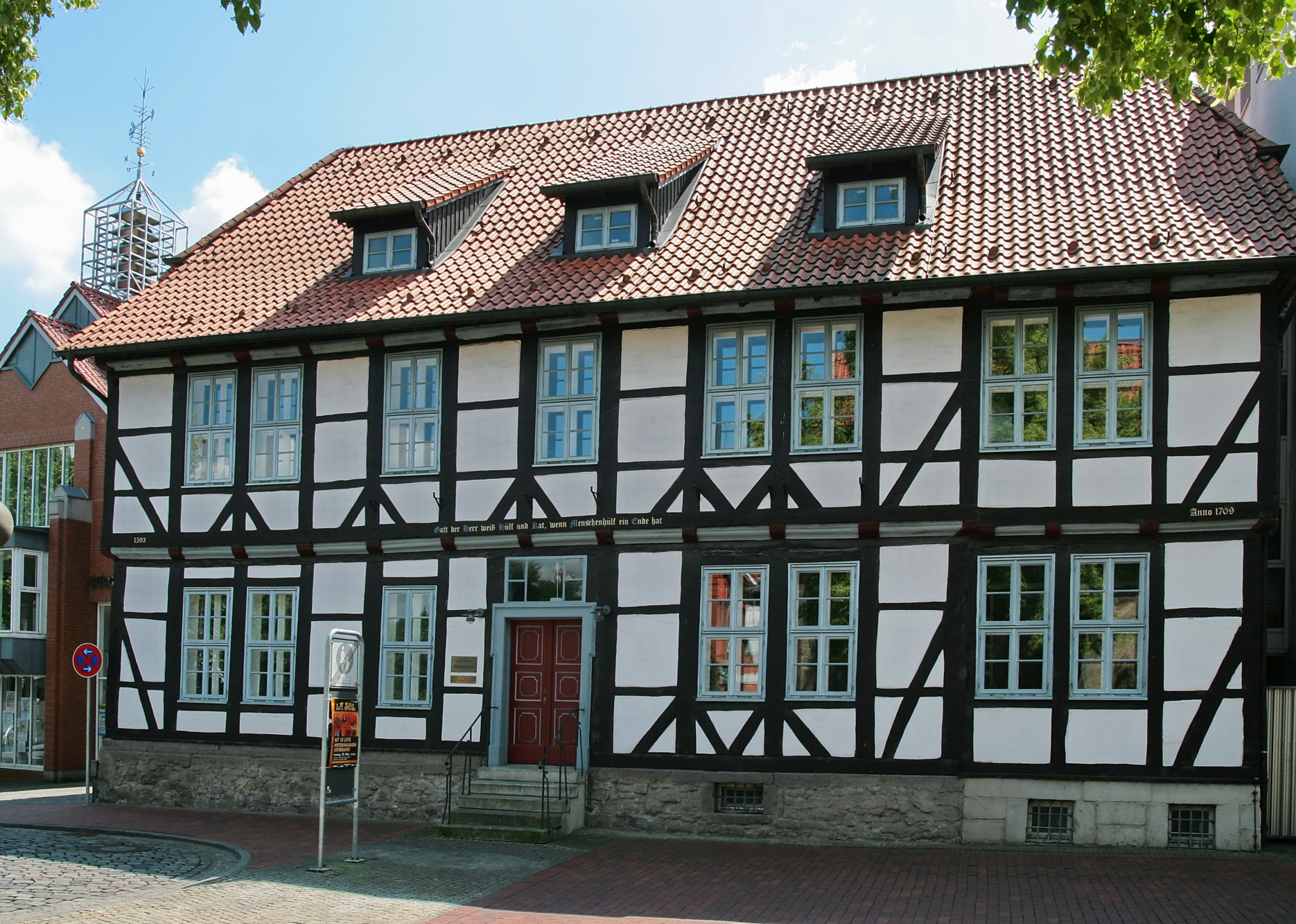
Half-timbered house at Stiftstraße, Wunstorf

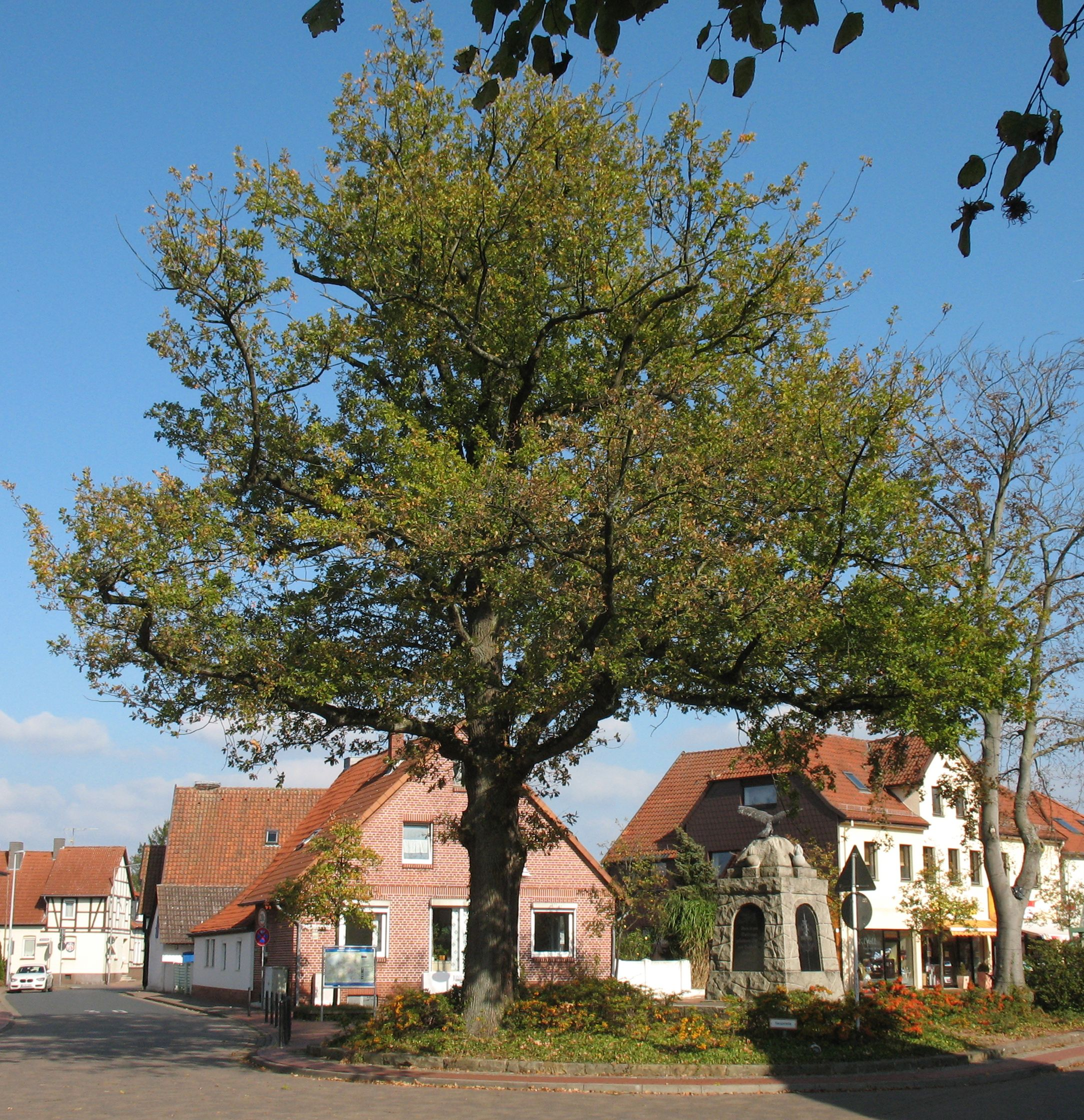
Oak of peace (Friedenseiche) and war memorial (Kriegerdenkmal, literally 'warrior memorial')
