= Alexander Spengler =

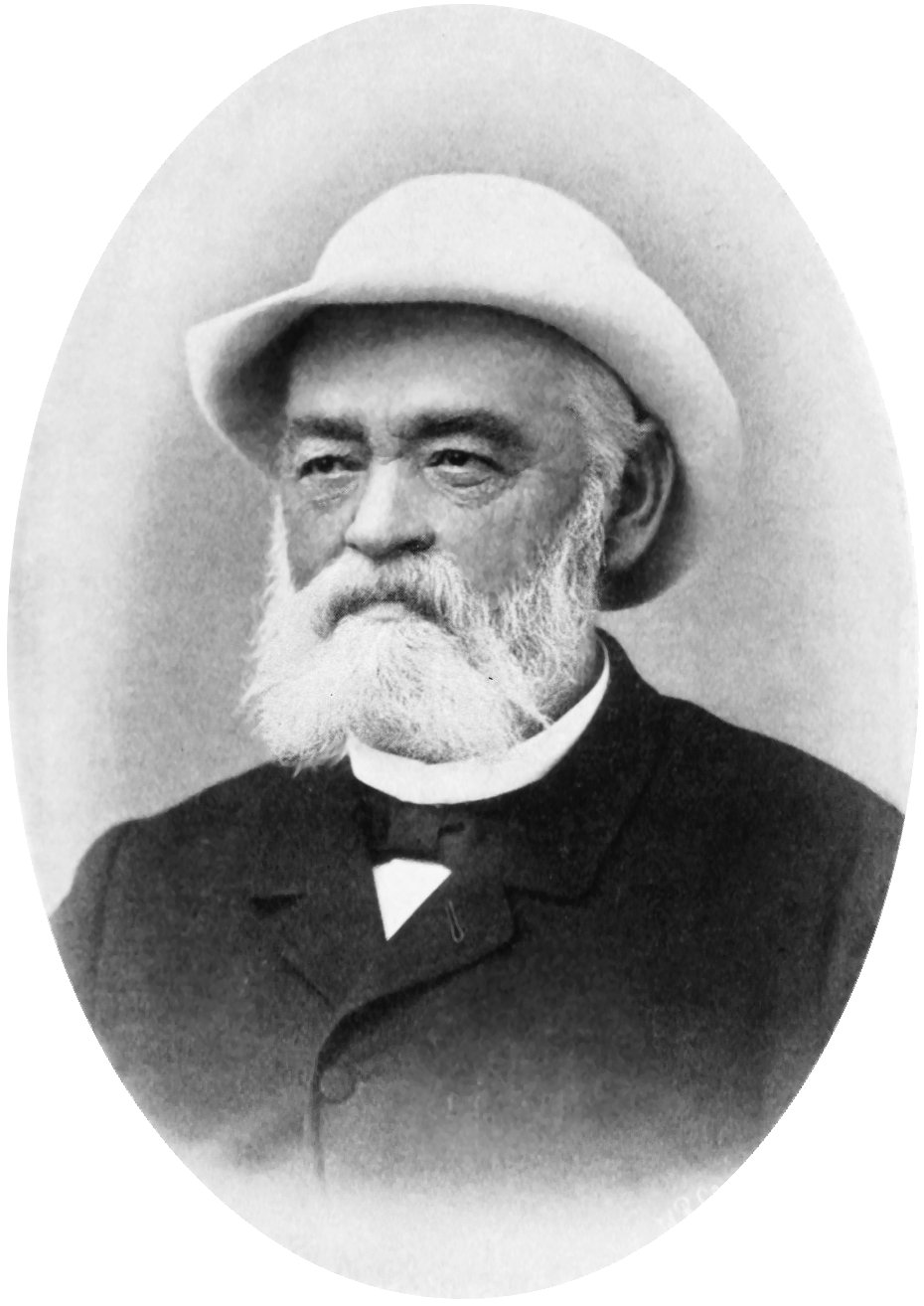

Alexander Spengler (20 March 1827 – 11 January 1901) was a Swiss physician of German origin and the first physician specializing in tuberculosis who created a sanatorium in Davos aimed to treat patients by providing them access to a healthy high altitude climate which was then thought to be effective as a treatment.

Spengler was born in Mannheim, the eldest son of Johann Philipp Spengler, a teacher at a local school. Starting in the autumn of 1846, he studied five terms of law at the University of Heidelberg. Spengler had taken part in the Baden Revolution of 1848/1849 and after the suppression of the revolution, he was expatriated for desertion from the Grand Duchy of Baden in 1850. He fled to Zurich, where he studied medicine. In 1853 he passed the medical exams, the stateless refugee got a job in Davos as a county doctor, which was remote at the time. His observation that pulmonary tuberculosis did not occur in Davos and that sick people returning home improved, marked the beginning of the development of the modern high-altitude health resort of Davos. He campaigned against the general belief that a Mediterranean climate was good for phthisis (the old name for tuberculosis) and began to conduct meteorological studies. Spengler's treatment largely involved letting the climate work and supplemented this with a diet that included milk and moderate amounts of wine (particularly red Veltliner). He supported the application of marmot fat by rubbing on the skin of the thorax. He also recommended cold showers and a reduction of body temperature. He used morphine to reduce coughing in advanced patients.

Spengler married Elisabeth Ambühl, daughter of a pastry chef who had worked in St. Petersburg and the marriage required citizenship by showing assets of at least 2000 francs. He was however able to convince the Grand Council of his merits and his naturalization was confirmed in June 1855. He married in July 1855 and they had two sons Carl Spengler and Lucius Spengler, both of whom became pulmonologists in Davos, and three daughters Ida Amalie Charlotte (1856–1935), Ursula Marie Emilie (1857–1872) and Maria (1863–1922).

== Bibliography ==
- Benjamin D. Miller: Alexander Spengler, Adolph Hirsch und Friedrich von Klinggräff – drei Heidelberger Studenten in der Märzrevolution 1848. In: Heidelberg. Jahrbuch zur Geschichte der Stadt 2024, Jg. 28, (Hg.) Heidelberger Geschichtsverein e.V., Kurpfälzischer Verlag, Heidelberg 2023, ISBN 978-3-910886-06-3, p. 19-35.
- Benjamin D. Miller: Alexander Spengler: Ein Revolutionär auf seinem Weg nach Davos. In: Jahrbuch 2024 der Historischen Gesellschaft Graubünden, 154. Volume, ISSN 1423-3029, p. 47–108.
