= Bombing of Braunschweig =

Event in World War 2 on 15 October 1944

Bombing of Braunschweig on 15 October 1944
- Part of the strategic bombing during World War II
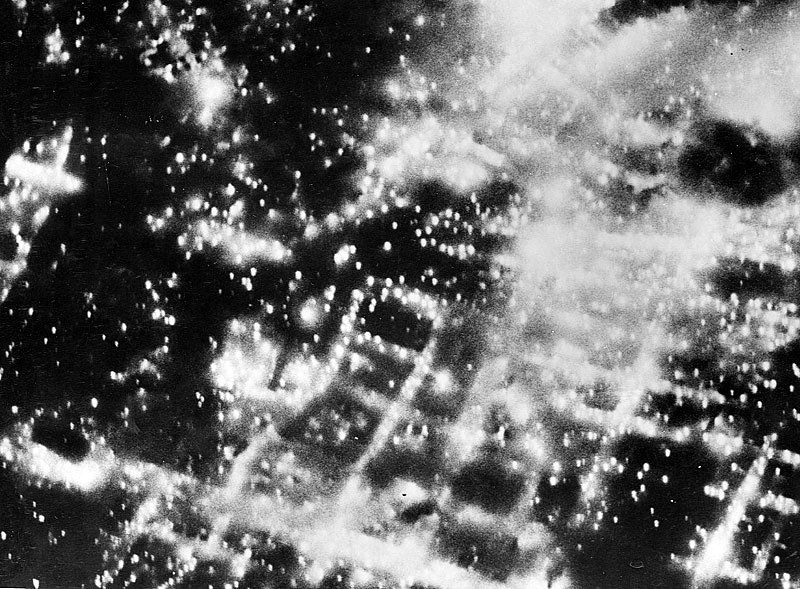
- Braunschweig on fire during the attack
- Type: Carpet bombing
- Location: Braunschweig, Germany; 52.2643°N 10.5242°E
- Date: 15 October 1944; 81 years ago 2:33 am – 3:10 am
- Executed by: No. 5 Group RAF
- Casualties: About 600 (officially); 1000s (unofficially)
- Location of Braunschweig within Lower Saxony, a German state founded after World War II

In the early hours of 15 October 1944, No. 5 Group of the Royal Air Force (RAF) carried out the most destructive of 42 attacks on Braunschweig (Brunswick) during World War II. The attack was a part of Operation Hurricane, which was designed to demonstrate the capabilities of the Allied bombing campaign. It caused a massive conflagration that developed into a firestorm, and resulted in Braunschweig, the city of Henry the Lion, burning continuously for two and a half days from 15 to 17 October. More than 90 percent of the mediaeval city centre was destroyed.

== Raids ==
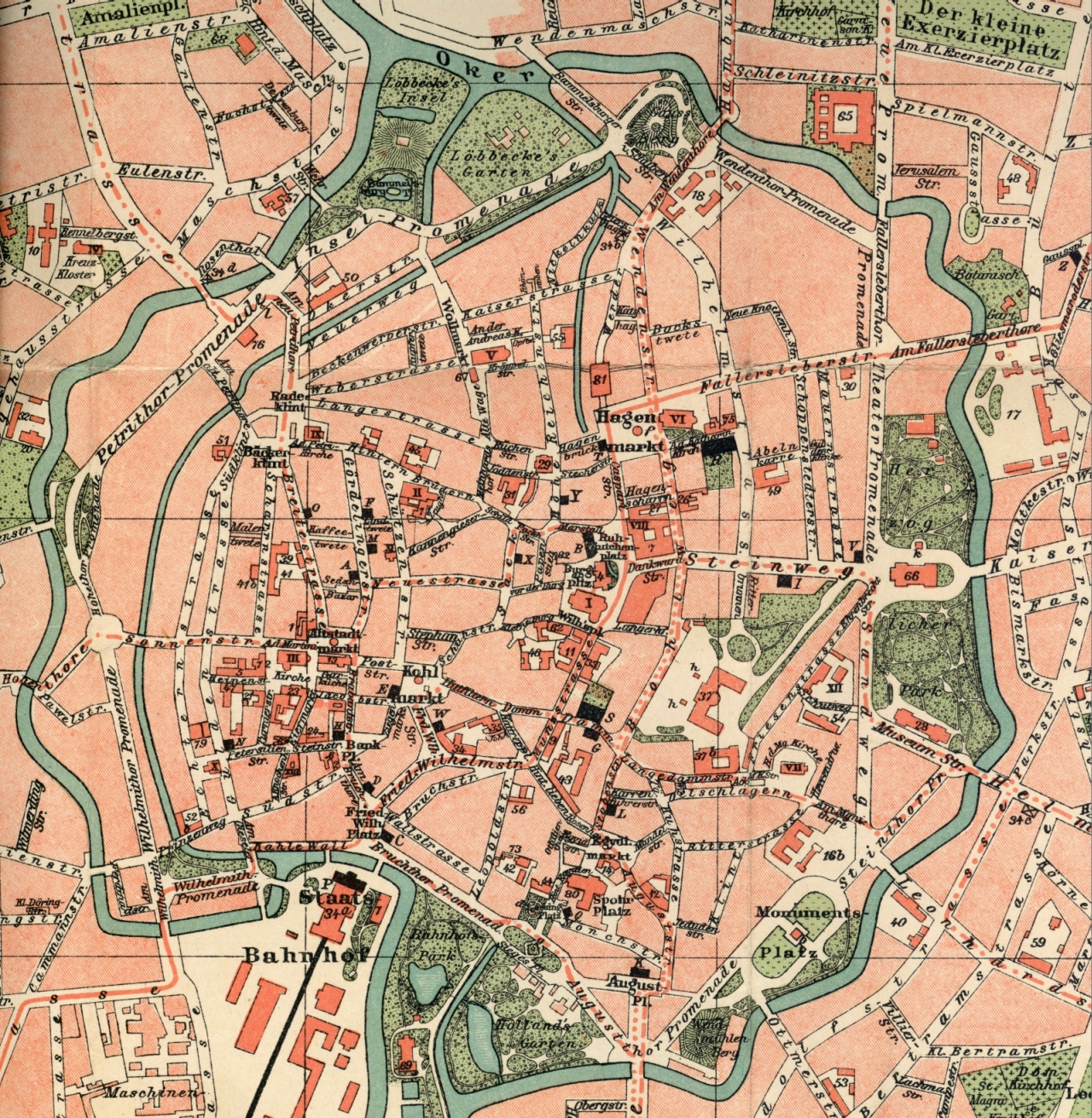
Map of Braunschweig city centre in 1899

The RAF first bombed Braunschweig on 17 August 1940, killing seven people, and the 94th Bombardment Group earned a Distinguished Service Cross for an 11 January 1944 mission against the Mühlenbau und Industrie Aktiengesellschaft (MIAG) components factory. As part of the Combined Bomber Offensive, Braunschweig was a regular target for (nighttime) RAF and (daytime) US attacks, including two "Big Week" attacks on 20 and 21 February 1944.

The first major British bombing of Braunschweig was in the night beginning 14 January 1944, when nearly 500 Lancaster bombers attacked in the face of strong defence by German fighters. Being a relatively small target, most of the bombs missed the city.

In an experimental raid, to see if bombing by radar alone (without target marking) was effective, nearly 400 heavy bombers raided Braunschweig during the night beginning 12 August 1944. No effective concentration of the bombs occurred, and nearby towns were bombed by mistake.

Between those dates, fast Mosquito bombers were sent on occasional nuisance raids and diversions against Braunschweig.

On 15 October 1944, No. 106 Squadron RAF bombed Braunschweig, and one of the last attacks was an attack on chemical plant in March 1945 as part of the campaign against synthetic oil production.

== Braunschweig in 1944 ==
Braunschweig was subjected to air raids despite the city being ringed by anti-aircraft guns. In January 1944, Bomber Command raids against "Stettin, Brunswick and Magdeburg" were suffering losses of 7.2 percent – more than in raids against Berlin that month. The targets included machine and munitions works, harbours, research institutions, canneries, railway stations and railway maintenance works, and the German Research Centre for Aviation. Targets near Braunschweig included the Reichswerke Hermann Göring in Salzgitter and the Volkswagen factory in KdF-Stadt near Fallersleben. The nearby Oflag 79 prisoner-of-war camp was attacked on 24 August 1944.

== Preparation for the 15 October 1944 air raid ==
=== Purpose of the raid ===
On 13 October, the RAF received orders to carry out Operation Hurricane, to demonstrate the Allied bomber force's destructive power, and Allied air superiority. The orders included the following:

In order to demonstrate to the enemy in Germany generally the overwhelming superiority of the Allied Air Forces in this theatre ... the intention is to apply within the shortest practical period the maximum effort of the Royal Air Force Bomber Command and the 8th United States Bomber Command against objectives in the densely populated Ruhr.

Operation Hurricane foresaw Duisburg as the main goal for the RAF's thousand or so bombers, and Cologne for the USAAF's 1,200 or so bombers. A further 233 RAF bombers were detailed for Braunschweig, which had about 150,000 inhabitants in October 1944.

Planning for the attack on Braunschweig was finalized by 15 August 1944. Darmstadt had been attacked on the night of 11 September 1944 using a new targeting technique: a fan-shaped flying formation, and the staggering of the use of explosive and incendiary bombs. Being a largely unprepared town, the resulting fires caused about 11,500 deaths. The Allies then turned their attention to Braunschweig.

Braunschweig was to be largely destroyed, not only as an important centre of the armament industry, but also, and above all, as a place where people lived making it uninhabitable and useless. The goal, namely the greatest possible destruction, was to be achieved through detailed attack plans and careful execution, and also making careful use of the attributes of the materiel that was to be deployed. The means whereby the goal was to be reached was a firestorm, the production of which was to be no accident but developed through painstakingly detailed analysis.

On 13 October, the chief meteorologist at RAF High Wycombe advised RAF Bomber Command headquarters of the weather forecast for the weekend of 14–15 October: slight cloudiness, good visibility throughout the night, and moderate winds. The next day, Air Marshal Arthur Harris issued the orders to carry out the attack on Braunschweig and other cities. (Note: Brunswick was codenamed Skate by RAF Bomber Command. All German cities were given names of fish, because the person responsible for the naming was a keen angler. For security reasons, the actual city names were never used in operational orders.)

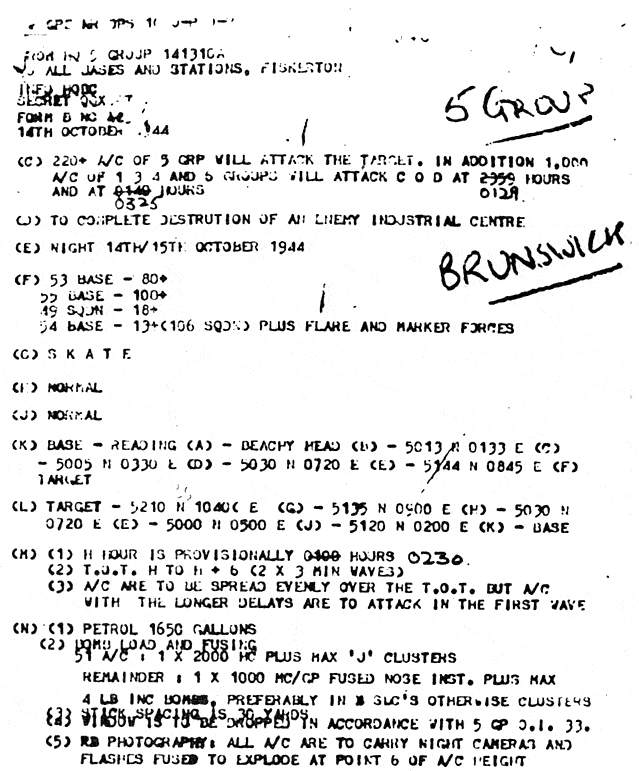
First page of the mission orders for No. 5 Group RAF

RAF Bomber Command had sought in vain to inflict lasting destruction upon Braunschweig four times during 1944, failing each time as a result of, among other things, bad weather and strong defences. On 14 October 1944, preparations for the attack were finalized at No. 5 Group's headquarters at Morton Hall.

== October 1944 raid ==
The raid coincided with a British thousand-bomber raid on Duisburg, the second on that city within 24 hours, a previous British attack having been made in daylight.

The aircraft of No. 5 Group took off as planned at around 11 pm on 14 October. (Note: During the war, Britain was on daylight saving time. In the winter, time was set to British Summer Time and in the summer to Double Summer Time, so local time and British time were the same.) The main force of the group were 233 four-engined Mark I and III Lancasters heavy bombers, each with a bomb load of about 6 tonnes (13,000 lb). The Lancasters were accompanied by 7 Mosquito fast light bombers.

The bombers bound for Braunschweig took a course that ran to the south to avoid the Ruhr area, which was heavily defended by anti-aircraft batteries and fighter aircraft. Near Paderborn, the force turned towards the north, overflying Hanover and proceeding to Braunschweig.

As was usual, the British actions for the night included a number of sorties to deceive the German defences about the true targets for the night. 141 training craft flew simulated attacks on Heligoland, 20 Mosquitos went to Hamburg, 8 to Mannheim, 16 to Berlin and 2 to Düsseldorf. They were supported by 140 special operations aircraft of 100 Group RAF, which deployed electronic warfare measures against German night-fighter defences. Strips of tinfoil (codenamed Window) were scattered into the air in large amounts to jam the German air defence system's radar stations, thereby rendering them nearly useless. The feint against Mannheim, which German forces expected to be the main target, left the Braunschweig attack unopposed.

The siren signal alerting Braunschweig to an air raid was sounded at about 1:50 am on 15 October.

=== Target marking ===
The Mosquitos of No. 5 Group marked the target for the main force. No. 5 Group had developed its own techniques separate to the Pathfinder Force and was using "sector bombing". It used the cathedral as a reckoning point for the "master bomber" in the lead plane. Over the Dom-Insel – the site of Braunschweig Cathedral – a green flare was dropped, a so-called blind marker. Other Mosquitos dropped their markers of various colours, lighting the target up. The first red flare fell south-west of the city centre. The same aircraft then dropped about 60 flares from a height of 1,000 metres (3,300 ft), which slowly floated down to the ground, each burning for about 3–7 minutes. Those lit markers were called Weihnachtsbaum (lit. 'Christmas tree') by the Germans, due to their characteristic appearance. Given the clear night, (Note: The report from filmed intelligence was "Visibility: excellent".) the problem-free overflight, and the flawless marking of the target, the conditions for the attack were optimal, from the British point of view.

The green marker on the Dom-Insel served to guide the bomb aimers in all following aircraft, who flew in over it from various directions in a fan-shaped formation, whereupon they dropped their bombs.

=== RAF filming ===
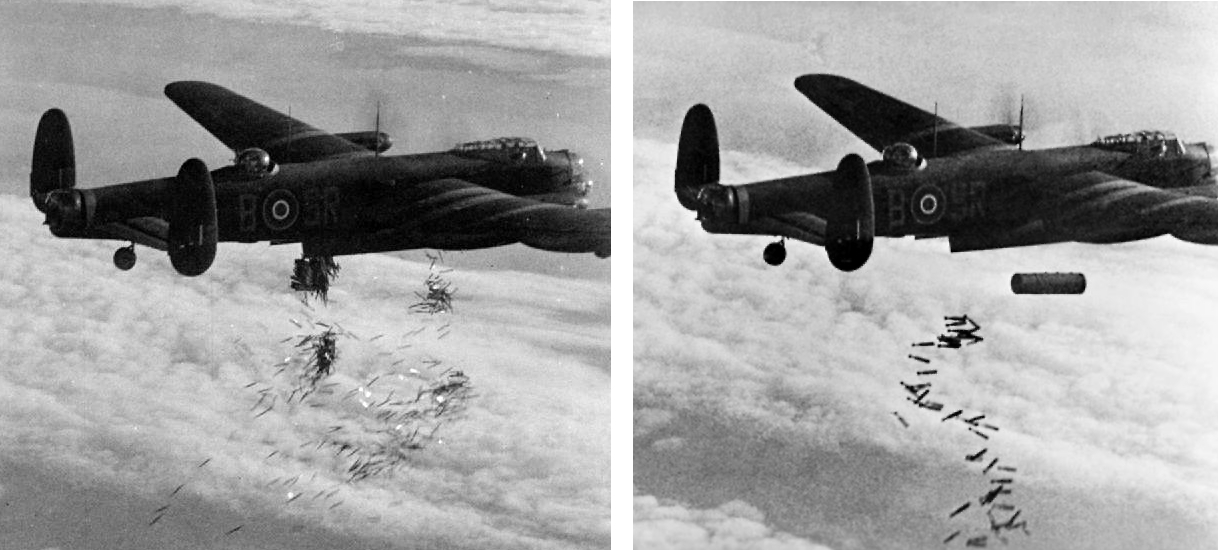
Stills from film taken of raid on Duisburg during night beginning 14 October 1944. A Lancaster drops "Window" to confuse enemy radar (left), then 14-kilogram (30 lb) incendiary bombs and a 1,800-kilogram (4,000 lb) "cookie".

This raid on Braunschweig was filmed by a Lancaster of the RAF Film Production Unit, outfitted for the task with three Eyemo-type cameras. The camera plane flew over Braunschweig, along with the rest of the bombers, at a height of 4,950 m (16,240 ft) at 260 km/h (160 mph). The time of the onset of the attack was noted as 2:33 am.

=== The firestorm ===
About 847 tonnes (1.9 million pounds) of bombs were dropped on the city. First to be deployed were about 12,000 explosive bombs – so-called blockbusters – in a carpet bombing of the old timber-framed town centre to start the intended firestorm by smashing up the wooden houses. Blast waves blew the roofs off houses, exposing the insides, blew windowpanes out, splintered the inner structure, broke walls down, tore electricity and water supplies up, and drove firefighters and rescue service personnel into cellars and bunkers, along with damage observers.

After the wave of explosive bombs, about 200,000 phosphorus and incendiary bombs were dropped, which were designed to ignite the destroyed buildings and create the firestorm, which would still be burning long after the bombers had returned to England.

By about 3:10 am, about 40 minutes after the first explosive bombs had been dropped, the attack was over. A hot mass of air rose rapidly upwards due to the powerful thermal generated by the conflagration. Cooler air rushed in to replace it, creating a windstorm. Winds blowing from all directions worsened the fires, further strengthening the winds, which became strong enough to sweep up small pieces of furniture and toss people about.

Around three and a half hours later, towards 6:30 am, the firestorm reached its peak in the city core. About 150 hectares (370 acres) of historic old Braunschweig were going up in flames. The city's tallest church steeples – those of St. Andrew's were about 100 metres (330 ft) tall – could be seen burning far beyond the town, and they also rained embers down over the whole city. The ruins of the city centre were littered with unexploded incendiary bombs, greatly hampering fire engines and rescue vehicles.

The city burned so intensely and brightly that the light from the fire could be seen far and wide. From all directions, helpers and firefighters thronged into the burning town to help. They came from, among other places, Hanover to the west and Helmstedt in the east, from Celle to the north and Quedlinburg to the south.

Within the 24 hours of Operation Hurricane, the RAF dropped a total of about 10,000 tonnes (22 million pounds) of bombs on Duisburg and Braunschweig.

=== Rescue of 23,000 trapped people ===
About 23,000 people had sought refuge from the attack in six large bunkers and two air raid shelters in the area. While these thousands of people waited in seeming safety inside their thick-walled but quite overfilled shelters for the all-clear signal, the many fires in the city centre quickly merged into one widespread conflagration.

The fire brigade very soon realized the threat to these people – the fire was growing ever hotter, and the oxygen in the bunkers and shelters thereby ever thinner. The danger was clearly that the victims would either suffocate for lack of oxygen if they stayed in their bunkers, or be burnt alive if they tried to leave and escape through the firestorm outside.

Towards 5 am, before the firestorm had reached its full intensity, the idea of building a Wassergasse (lit. 'water alley') was suggested by Rudolf Prescher, lieutenant of the fire brigade. This alley would allow the people to flee their shelters for safer areas of the city. It consisted of a long hose that had to be kept under a constant water mist to shield it against the fire's tremendous heat as the firefighters led the hose through to the shelters where the people were trapped. The reach of each of the little jets issuing from the holes in the hose overlapped each other, making a continuous, artificial "rain zone".

The bunkers were reached towards 7 am Sunday morning, after the fire storm had reached its greatest intensity. All the trapped people were still alive, but had no idea what lay outside for them. All 23,000 managed to reach safer areas, such as the museum park. Only at the Schöppenstedter Straße 31 air shelter did help arrive too late: 95 of the 104 people inside had suffocated by the time the fire brigade reached them. The firestorm had been so intense in this particular part of the city that it had used up nearly all the oxygen, making saving more than 9 people impossible.

=== Effects ===
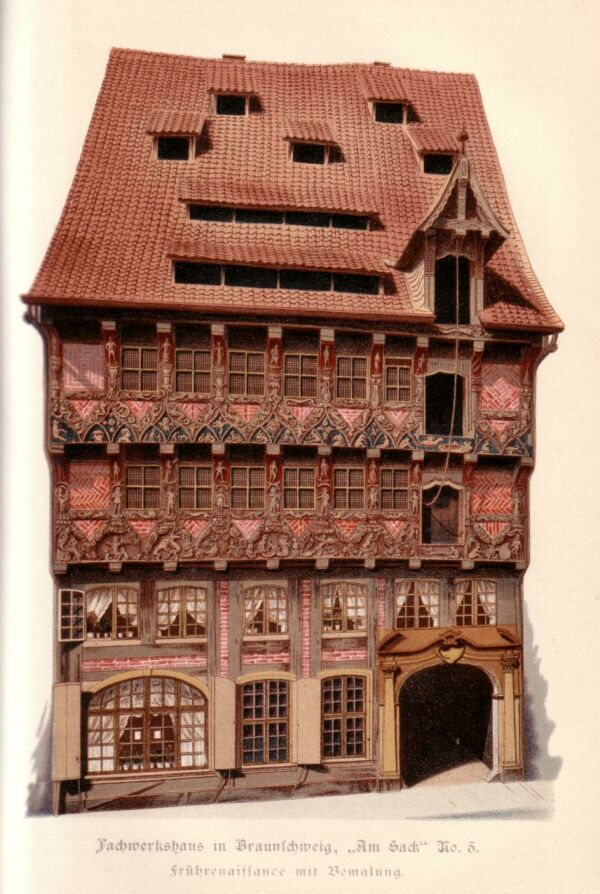
Typical Braunschweig half-timbered house

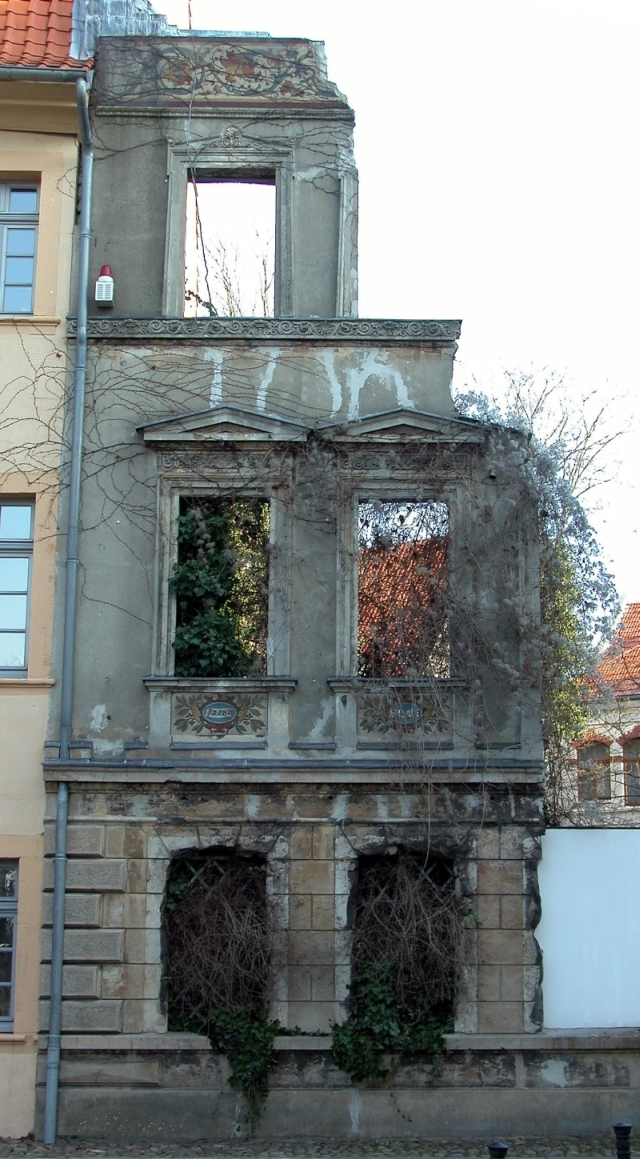
Ruins of the Hotel Handelshof in 2006

A large part of Braunschweig's tightly packed city centre was made up of about 800 timber-frame houses, many of which dated back to the Middle Ages. The city also had stone buildings dating mainly to the 17th and 18th centuries. The old cathedral, which the RAF had used as a reckoning point for the whole operation, remained standing. However, many significant historic buildings were largely or completely destroyed.

Building	time built	Condition after 15 October 1944
Aegidienkirche (church)	13th–15th centuries	Heavily damaged
Alte Waage	1534	Utterly destroyed, rebuilt from 1990 to 1994
Andreas-Kirche (church)	About 1230	Heavily damaged
Bierbaumsches Haus	1523	Destroyed
Brunswick Palace	1833–1841	Heavily damaged, it was demolished in 1960 amid great controversy, and reconstructed and reopened 2008. Now it houses the city library and joined with the new Schloss-Arkaden mall.
Brüdern-Kirche (church)	About 1361	Heavily damaged
Dankwarderode Castle	1887–1906	Heavily damaged
Gewandhaus ('cloth hall')	Before 1268	Heavily damaged
Hagenmarkt-Apotheke	1677	Destroyed
Haus Salve Hospes	1805	Heavily damaged
Katharinen-Kirche (church)	About 1200	Heavily damaged
Liberei	1412–1422	Heavily damaged
Magnikirche (church)	About 1031	Heavily damaged
Martineum	1415	Destroyed
Martini-Kirche (church)	About 1195	Heavily damaged
Meinhardshof	About 1320	Destroyed
Mumme-Haus (brewery)	16th century	Destroyed
Nicolai-Kirche (church)	1710–1712	Destroyed
Pauli-Kirche (church)	1901/06	Heavily damaged
Petri-Kirche (church)	Before 1195	Heavily damaged
Stechinelli-Haus	1690	Heavily damaged
Staatstheater	1861	Heavily damaged

The next morning, 16 October, Braunschweig lay under a thick cloud of smoke. A British reconnaissance aircraft sent to take photographs of the bombing's aftermath for analysis had to return to England, as its mission had been rendered impossible by the opaque pall that hung over the town.

By the evening of 17 October, the last of the fire's main hotspots had been put out, but it took another three days to quench lesser fires, until 20 October. 80,000 of the townsfolk were left homeless by the attack.

The destruction was so widespread and thorough that ordinary people and experts alike, even years after the war, were convinced that the attack had come from one of the dreaded thousand-bomber attacks, such as the one that had laid Cologne waste. The extent of the damage could seemingly not otherwise be explained. Only after the British opened their military archives did it become plain that it had been "only" 233 bombers.

=== Casualties ===
The exact number of victims of the 15 October attack is unknown. Estimates ranged from 484 to 640 dead, 95 of those by suffocation at the Schöppenstedter Straße 31 shelter alone. However, historians now put the number at more than a thousand.

These "light" losses – compared with those suffered in the great air raids on Dresden, Hamburg, Pforzheim and other German cities – according to expert opinions stem from various factors. For one thing, Braunschweig lay on the direct flight path, that is, the "lane" leading to Magdeburg and Berlin, and right near the armament industry centres of Salzgitter (Reichswerke Hermann Göring) and Wolfsburg (Volkswagen factory), meaning that Braunschweigers were used to – even in a sense "trained for" – quickly responding to alarms (there were 2,040 warnings and 620 air raid alarms between 1939 and 1945). This may have prepared them for the attack, even though many of the earlier attacks from which they had sought shelter actually targeted other cities. Furthermore, the city also had at its disposal a great number of the latest type of air raid bunkers and blockhouses known as Hochbunkers. Lastly, the fire brigade's water alley alone saved the lives of about 23,000 people.

The RAF lost a single Lancaster bomber to anti-aircraft fire that night.

==== Bunkers in Braunschweig ====
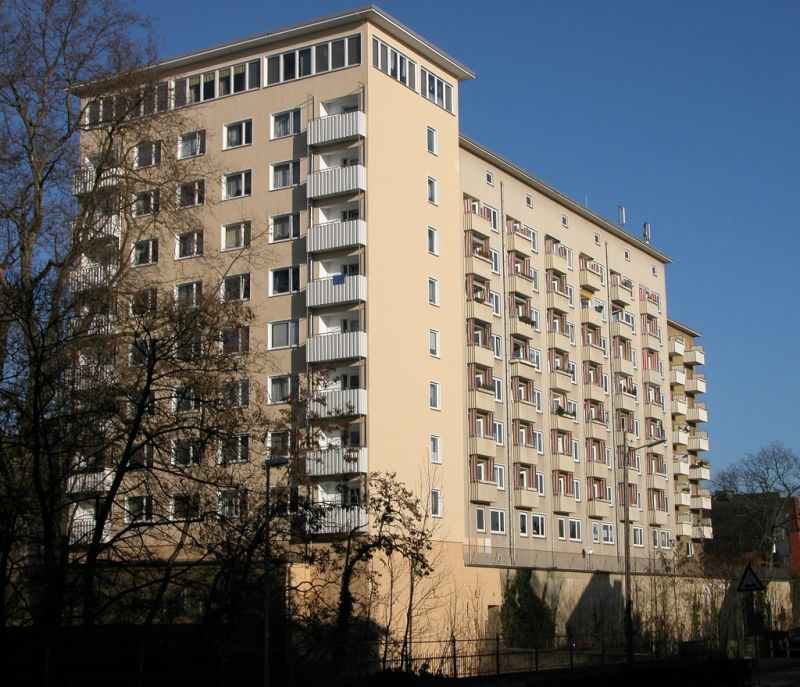
Built-over bunker, Okerstraße (2006)

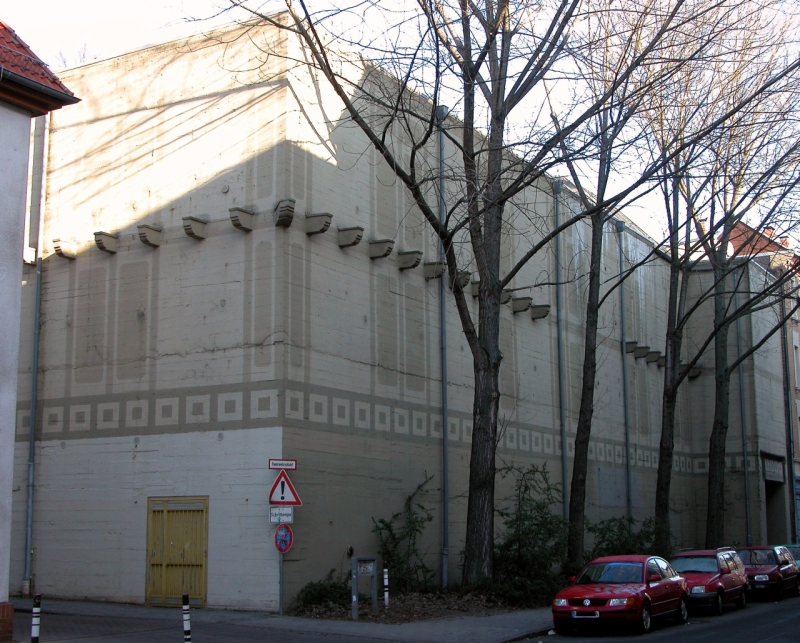
Bunker, Kaiserstraße (2006)

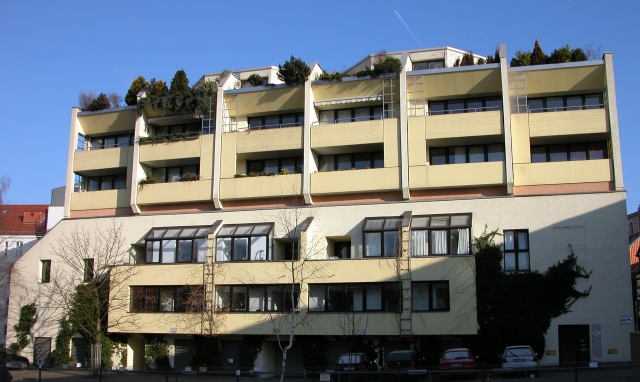
High bunker, Ritterstraße (2006)

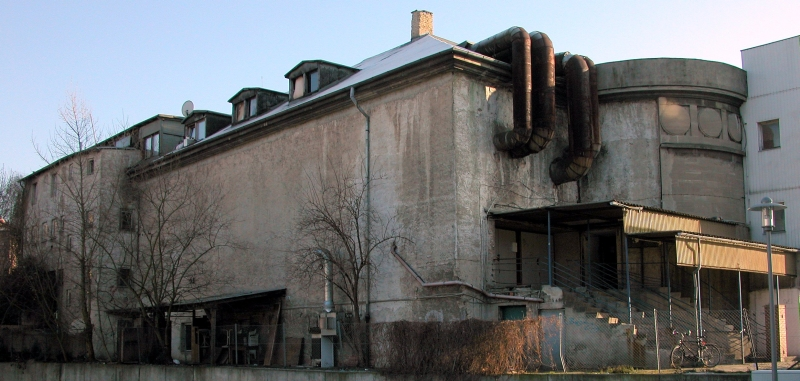
Back of Kalenwall Bunker (2006)

=== Braunschweig Armour ===
Braunschweig had, compared to other German cities, a great number of the most modern air raid bunkers, some of which were Hochbunker (lit. 'high-rise bunkers'), which nevertheless suffered from regular overcrowding as the war wore on. As modern and robust as they were, the fact is that the so-called Braunschweig Armour was developed at the Institute for Building Materials, Massive Construction and Fire Protection of the Technical University of Braunschweig. It became a kind of safety standard for building air raid bunkers throughout the Reich.

	Year built	Location	Places	Remarks
1	1940	Alte Kochenhauerstraße	813	Still standing, on synagogue property
2	1940/41	Alte Waage	220	Still standing
3	1941/42	Bockstwete	750	Still standing, altered
4	1941/42	Borsigstraße/Bebelhof	800	Torn down
5	?	Kaiserstraße	642	Still standing
6	?	Kalenwall (old railway station)	428	Still standing, altered
7	1941/42	Kralenriede	500	Still standing
8	1941/42	Ludwigstraße	236	Still standing
9	1941/42	Madamenweg	1,500	Still standing, altered for use as flats
10	ab 1942	Glogaustraße in Melverode	350	Still standing
11	1941/42	Methfesselstraße	1,250	Still standing, altered
12	1941/42	Münzstraße (Polizei, 'police')	450	Still standing
13	1940/41	Okerstraße	944	Still standing, altered for use as flats
14	1944	Ritterstraße	840	Still standing, altered for use as flats
15	1940/41	Auerstraße in Rühme	650	Torn down
16	1940/41	Sack	700	Still standing, altered
17	1940/41	Salzdahlumer Straße	986	Still standing, altered
18	?	Stollen im Nussberg	10,000	Demolished with explosives
19	?	Stollen im Windmühlenberg	1,000	Eliminated

=== Fire brigades from Braunschweig and other cities deployed against the firestorm ===
According to estimates, especially during the night of the bombing as well as in the next six days until the last fires were put out, about 4,500 firefighters were deployed. They came from up to 90 kilometres (56 mi) away, and included not only members of city fire brigades from, among other places, Blankenburg, Celle, Gifhorn, Hanover, Helmstedt, Hildesheim, Peine, Salzgitter, Wernigerode and Wolfenbüttel, but also volunteers and members of plant fire brigades at the various factories in Braunschweig and the surrounding area. Due to their efforts the city was not utterly burnt that night.

== Aftermath ==
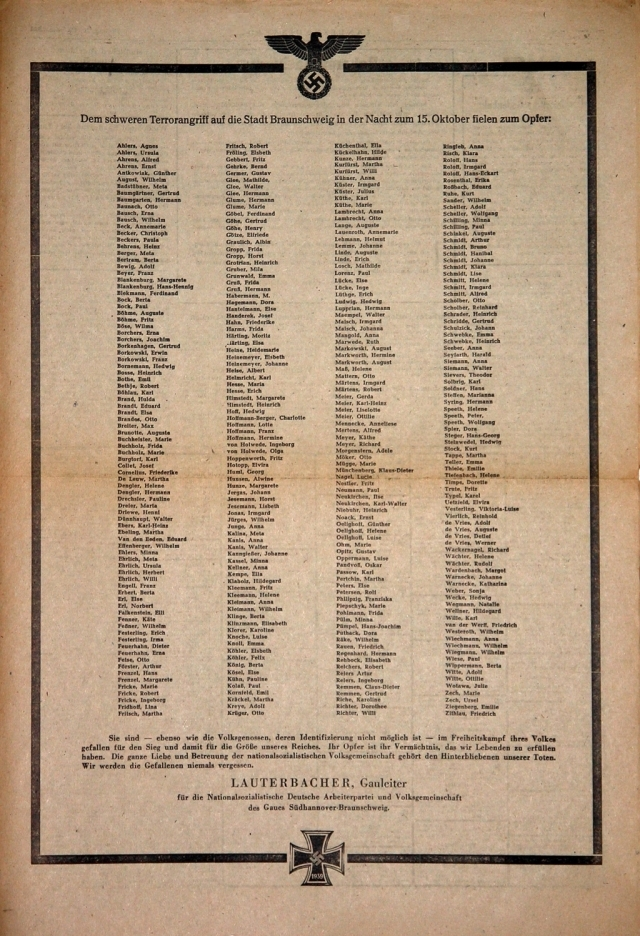
Notice in the Braunschweiger Tageszeitung of 20 October 1944

On 19 October, the number of dead was given as 405, and on 20 October a full-page necrology with 344 names was published. On 22 October, one week after the attack, a memorial was held for the victims, both at the Brunswick Cathedral and at the Schlossplatz, the square in front of Braunschweig Palace. The same night, Braunschweig was again attacked heavily, this time by USAAF Boeing B-17 Flying Fortresses.

The last air raid on Braunschweig occurred on the morning of 31 March 1945, carried out by the 392d Bombardment Group. Their main target was the east railway station.

== Statistics of destruction ==
=== Population ===
When World War II began, Braunschweig had 202,284 inhabitants. By the war's end, the population had fallen by 26.03% to 149,641. From the effects of war (mainly air raids but also their aftermath, such as having to dispose of, or otherwise make safe, the duds that the Allies dropped) about 2,905 people died, 1,286 of whom (44.3%) were foreigners. These foreigners were predominantly prisoners of war, forced labourers, and concentration camp inmates who worked in the armament industry, and who were forbidden access to air raid bunkers.

=== Destruction of housing and infrastructure ===
Exact figures are available only for destroyed houses and flats. By the time the war was over, about 20% of Braunschweig's dwellings had been left completely undamaged, but about 24% of them had been utterly destroyed. The remaining 56% were somewhat damaged, with the extent of damage to any particular dwelling varying greatly with others. In 1943, before the area bombing of Braunschweig, there were 15,897 houses in the city, but by mid-1945, only 2,834 (about 18%) were left undamaged. The city also had 59,826 flats, of which 11,153 (about 19%) were still undamaged by the time the war ended. The level of destruction with regard to residential buildings stood at 35%, leading to homelessness for almost 80% of the townsfolk by war's end. Sixty percent of the city's places of cultural interest, including the municipal buildings, were likewise destroyed, along with about 50% of its industrial areas.

=== Overall destruction rate and amount of rubble ===
The destruction rate in Braunschweig's downtown core (within the Oker Ring, the Oker being a river that encircles Braunschweig) stood at about 90%, and the overall figure for Braunschweig as a whole was 42%. At the end of the war, an estimated 3,670,500 cubic metres (129.62 million cubic feet) of rubble had to be cleared. These figures put Braunschweig among Germany's most heavily damaged cities of World War II.

== After the war ==
=== Reconstruction ===
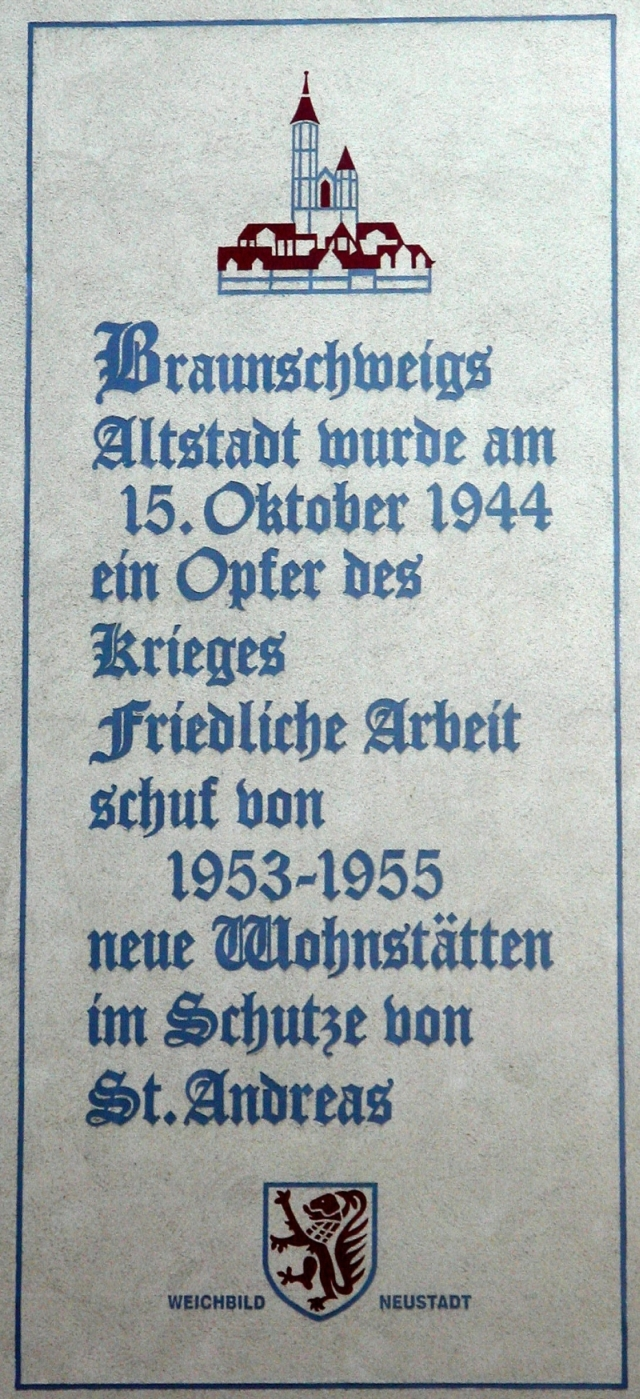
Reconstruction and commemoration sign on a house wall neighbouring the Andreaskirche that translated to English reads "On 15 October 1944 Braunschweig's old town became a victim of the war. Peaceful work from 1953–1955 built new homes, protected by St. Andrew."

On 17 June 1946, the rubble clearing officially began in Braunschweig. The job took 17 years, with the city only officially declaring the task accomplished in 1963. In actuality however, smaller cleanups lasted years after that.

Braunschweig's reconstruction in the 1950s and 1960s proceeded very quickly, as housing was badly needed and the city's infrastructure had to be built from scratch. Since the downtown core was a rubble-strewn wasteland, city and spatial planners seized the chance to build a new, modern, and above all car-friendly city, an idea promoted by Hans Bernhard Reichow. This once again led in many places to further destruction (through new roadways, for instance) and the removal of city scenery that had become historic, since in part the former city layout was ignored. Ruins were hastily torn down instead of being restored, and the car was raised as the new "yardstick" whereby the "new" Braunschweig was to be measured. Thus was wrought, especially in the downtown core, a "second destruction" of Braunschweig.

The later destruction of historic buildings and cultural sites, such as the demolition of many mediaeval, baroque and classical buildings and the controversial demolition of the damaged Brunswick Palace in 1960 that was almost faithfully reconstruction only in 2007 led – much as with the Frauenkirche in Dresden, the Berlin Palace and other prominent buildings in other cities – to a further loss of identity for the local people, and was the cause of much controversy for decades.

=== Memorials ===
==== Meaning and necessity of the destruction ====
As early as 1943, the Anglican Bishop and Member of the House of Lords George Bell was putting forth the view that attacks such as these threatened the ethical foundations of Western civilization and destroyed any chance of future reconciliation between former foes.

Since the end of World War II, the question has been raised as to whether the destruction of Braunschweig in October 1944 was still a military necessity given that the war was into its final phase. This is part of the debate on whether the destruction of other German cities and loss of life that occurred once the Allied strategic bomber forces were released from their tactical support of the Normandy landings and resumed the strategic bombing campaign in September 1944 (a campaign that would last without further interruption until days before the end of World War II in Europe in May 1945) can be morally justified.

==== 15 October as a fixed point in the city's history ====
In the Main Cemetery in Braunschweig is a memorial, together with the graves of many victims of the 15 October 1944 attack.

Since the bombing, memorial events and exhibitions are held in Braunschweig on 14–15 October. The events of those two days also echo strongly in local historical literature. On 14–15 October 2004 – the sixtieth anniversary of the destruction of Braunschweig's historic old town – there were once again many events. Among other memorials that took place was Benjamin Britten's War Requiem, conducted at the Braunschweig Cathedral in the presence of British Ambassador Peter Torry.

== Sources ==
- "The Missions". 447th Bomb Group. n.d. Archived from the original on 26 February 2009.
- Biegel, Gerd (10 August 2026). "Braunschweig 1946: Aufbruch des Kulturlebens nach den Schrecken des Krieges". Braunschweiger Zeitung (in German).
- Bowman, Martin W. (21 May 2009). Legend of the Lancaster: the Bomber War from England 1942-45. Pen & Sword Aviation. ISBN 9781781598641.
- "Die Bomben-Nacht. Der Luftkrieg vor 60 Jahren". Braunschweiger Zeitung (in German). Braunschweig. 2004.
- Braunschweig im Bombenkrieg. 50 Jahre danach. Den Opfern des Krieges gewidmet (in German). Vol. 1, Dokumente zur Ausstellung 30.09. – 31.10.1993. Braunschweig: Friedenszentrum Braunschweig e.V. 1994.
- Braunschweig im Bombenkrieg. 50 Jahre danach. Den Opfern des Krieges gewidmet (in German). Vol. 2, Dokumente von Zeitzeuginnen und Zeitzeugen: 'Bomben auf Braunschweig' . Braunschweig: Friedenszentrum Braunschweig e.V., Landesmuseum 11.09. – 16.10.1994. 1994.
- Braunschweig im Bombenkrieg. 50 Jahre danach. Den Opfern des Krieges gewidmet (in German). Vol. 3, Dokumente aus der Gedenknacht 14./15.10.1994: 'Die Gerloff-Berichte' . Braunschweig: Friedenszentrum Braunschweig e.V. 1994.
- Bomber Command Campaign Diary. Bomber Command 60th Anniversary. Royal Air Force. 6 April 2005. Wikidata Q131324214. Archived from the original on 6 July 2007.
  - The Battle of France (May–June 1940). Campaign Diary. Royal Air Force. 6 April 2005. Wikidata Q131329002. Archived from the original on 6 July 2007.
  - September–December 1941. Campaign Diary. Royal Air Force. 6 April 2005. Wikidata Q131329070. Archived from the original on 6 July 2007.
  - December 1942. Campaign Diary. Royal Air Force. 6 April 2005. Wikidata Q131329091. Archived from the original on 6 July 2007.
  - December 1943. Campaign Diary. Royal Air Force. 6 April 2005. Wikidata Q131325748. Archived from the original on 6 July 2007.
  - January 1944. Campaign Diary. Royal Air Force. 6 April 2005. Wikidata Q131325860. Archived from the original on 6 July 2007.
  - February 1944. Campaign Diary. Royal Air Force. 6 April 2005. Wikidata Q131325970. Archived from the original on 6 July 2007.
  - August 1944. Campaign Diary. Royal Air Force. 6 April 2005. Wikidata Q131327223. Archived from the original on 6 July 2007.
  - October 1944. Campaign Diary. Royal Air Force. 6 April 2005. Wikidata Q131327997. Archived from the original on 6 July 2007.
  - March 1945. Campaign Diary. Royal Air Force. 6 April 2005. Wikidata Q131329044. Archived from the original on 6 July 2007.
- "15. Oktober – Die Zerstörung der Stadt Braunschweig 1944" [15 October – Destruction of the City Brunswick in 1944]. Die Braunschweigische Stiftung (in German). 26 August 2019. Archived from the original on 23 August 2019.
- Remembered and commented on by Eckard Schimpf (2005). Braunschweig 1945 – Bombardierung, Befreiung, Leben in Trümmern (DVD) (in German). Braunschweig: Braunschweiger Zeitung und Archiv Verlag.
- "The Battle of Britain (June–October 1940)". Royal Air Force Bomber Command 60th Anniversary. Crown. 6 April 2005. Archived from the original on 29 August 2006.
- The Bomber's Baedeker (Part I, Aachen – Küstrin): Guide to the Economic Importance of German Towns and Cities (PDF). London: Enemy Branch. 1944. p. i,91–96. OCLC 1427322522. Wikidata Q131176036.
- Friedrich, Jörg (2002). Der Brand: Deutschland im Bombenkrieg 1940–1945 (in German). Munich: Propyläen Verlag. ISBN 3-549-07165-5. LCCN 2003425287. OCLC 186484412. OL 26639576M. Wikidata Q131292409.
- Friedrich, Jörg (2006). The Fire: The Bombing of Germany, 1940–1945. New York City: Columbia University Press. ISBN 0-231-13380-4. LCCN 2006010408. OCLC 174099964. OL 22740605M. Wikidata Q135258464.
- Grayling, Anthony Clifford (2006). Among the Dead Cities: Was the Allied Bombing of Civilians in WWII a Necessity or a Crime?. London: Bloomsbury Publishing. ISBN 978-0-7475-7671-6. OCLC 1391179967. OL 22239519M. Wikidata Q136472797.
- Haake, Lydia (16 October 2024). "15. Oktober 1944: Schlimmster Bombenangriff auf Braunschweig" [15 October 1944: Worst Bombattack upon Brunswick]. Norddeutscher Rundfunk (in German).
- Hastings, Max (1979). Bomber Command. New York: Dial Press/James Wade. ISBN 0718116038. LCCN 79017122. OCLC 5170758.
- Hempel, Joachim (14 October 2024). "Als die Kirchtürme brannten" [When the Church Towers burnt]. Braunschweig-Spiegel (in German).
- Hinchliffe, Peter (10 June 2008). "Let Us Honor Brave Men: Part Two". OhmyNews. Archived from the original on 5 June 2011.
- "Braunschweiger Bombennacht 1944: Feuer vernichtet Altstadt" [Brunswick Night of Bombs 1944: Fire Destroys Old Town]. Norddeutscher Rundfunk (in German). 16 October 2024.
- Prescher, Rudolf (1955). Spiess, Werner (ed.). Der rote Hahn über Braunschweig: Luftschutzmaßnahmen und Luftkriegsereignisse in der Stadt Braunschweig 1927 bis 1945 (PDF). Braunschweiger Werkstücke (in German). Brunswick: Waisenhaus-Buchdruckerei. doi:10.24355/dbbs.084-201801311138. OCLC 1239810409. Wikidata Q131286971.
- Feuersturm – Der Bombenkrieg gegen Deutschland (DVD) (in German). SPIEGEL TV history. Polar Film Medien (Gescher). 2003. ASIN B001O7H934.

== General references ==
- Grote, Eckart (1983). Braunschweig im Luftkrieg. Alliierte Film-, Bild- und Einsatzberichte der US-Air Force / British Royal Air Force aus den Jahren 1944/1945 als stadtgeschichtliche Dokumente (in German). Braunschweig.
- Grote, Eckart (1994a). "Braunschweig im Zweitem Weltkrieg. Dokumente einer Zerstörung – Stunde Null – Neubeginn". Arbeitsberichte aus dem Städtischen Museum Braunschweig (in German). Vol. 65. Braunschweig.
- Grote, Eckart (1994b). Target Brunswick 1943–1945. Luftangriffsziel Braunschweig – Dokumente der Zerstörung (in German). Braunschweig.
- Neumann, Peter (1984). "Braunschweig als Bombenziel. Aus Aufzeichnungen der Jahre 1944 und 1945". Braunschweigisches Jahrbuch (in German). Vol. 65. Braunschweig.
- Schimpf, Eckart (1998). Nachts, als die Weihnachtsbäume kamen. Eine ganz normale Braunschweiger Kindheit im Chaos von Kriegs- und Nachkriegszeit (in German). Braunschweig.
- Kalshoven, Hedda (1995). Ich denk' so viel an Euch. Ein deutsch-niederländischer Briefwechsel 1920–1949 (in German). Munich.
