= Carl Spengler =

Swiss surgeon, pulmonologist and bacteriologist

Carl Spengler (30 June 1860 – 15 September 1937) was a Swiss surgeon, pulmonologist and bacteriologist. He founded what is probably the oldest international ice hockey tournament, the Spengler Cup.

== Career ==
Spengler's father Alexander Spengler was the discoverer of the healing effects of the high altitude climate of Davos. Carl Spengler was probably the first person to try skiing in the Alps. His father Alexander Spengler was given a pair of Sami hunting skis by a Nordic patient in 1873.

He presented his experience with thoracoplasty surgery on tuberculosis patients in a lecture in Davos in 1890. He was one of the first to use this method. Spengler worked for a time as a researcher in immunology with Robert Koch in Berlin. Back in Davos, he published over 70 scientific papers, many of which dealt with the fight against tuberculosis and other plagues. He was a tireless researcher of evidence-based medicine.

== Personal life ==
Spengler promoted the then new sport of ice hockey when in 1921 his son Alexander K. Spengler founded the HC Davos with his mates. In 1923, he founded the famous Spengler Cup. He wanted to offer the once hostile nations of Europe the opportunity to measure their strength in peaceful combat and to shake hands in a spirit of comradeship.
