= Andreas Spengler =

German psychiatrist and researcher (born 1947)

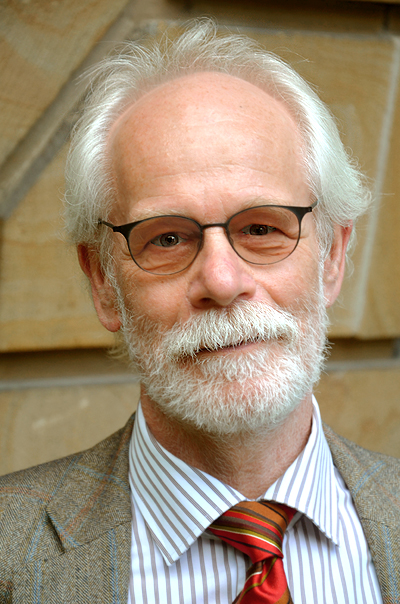
Among the numerous guests at the summer festival organized by Andor Izsák together with the Friends of Hanover for the Week of Brotherhood in the Villa Seligmann was the retired senior medical director. Prof. Dr. med. Andreas Spengler, specialist in psychiatry and psychotherapy, specialist in psychotherapeutic medicine with a focus on forensic psychiatry / DGPPN ...

Andreas Spengler (born 10 Juni 1947 in Goslar) is a German psychiatrist and researcher who conducted through 1974 and 1975 a well-known sociological study on sadomasochism in men at the Institute for Sexual Research in the University Hospital Eppendorf in Hamburg, Germany.

== Biography ==
For his MD at the Institute for Sexual Research at the University Hospital Eppendorf in Hamburg in 1976 he laid the first international empirical survey of sadomasochists and their subculture. Years later his studies were published in book form which to date have been translated into several language. One of the most important aspects of this study consisted in its being the first to approach in an empirical way and with modern sociological techniques the subject of sadomasochism, and oppose their results to the assumptions and conclusions of the only previous study done by Krafft-Ebing. In Hamburg he later became involved in social-psychiatric reform projects and the development of psychiatric emergency service.

From 1988 to 2008 he served as medical director at the Lower Saxony State Hospital Wunstorf, today Klinikum Region Hannover Wunstorf. He is a full member of the International Academy of Sex Research and a member of other professional societies, and has published about sexology, psychiatric emergencies, involuntary commitment, forensic psychiatry, and mental health service. He is a qualified medical specialist in psychiatry, psychotherapy and forensic psychiatry. From 2008 to spring 2013 he has served as chairman of the Lower Saxony Committee on matters of mental health care. Beside his main profession, he is get involved with outsider art and history.

== Publications ==
- Sadomasochisten und ihre Subkulturen. Campus, Frankfurt am Main und New York 1979, ISBN 3-593-32374-5.
- Manifest Sadomasochism of Males: Results of an empirical Study. In: Archives of Sexual Behavior 6 (1977) 441–456. Reprint in: Weinberg, T.p., G.W. Kamel (ed.): Studies on sexual dominance and submission. Prometheus Books Buffalo 1983.
- Transsexualität - eine Krankheit im Sinne der RVO. In: Neue Juristische Wochenschrift 24 (1978) 1192-1193
- Psychosexuelle Störungen nach Genitaloperationen. Habilitation thesis, Universitätskrankenhaus Eppendorf. Hamburg 1984
- Maßregelvollzug – ungebremster Zuwachs. In: Deutsches Ärzteblatt 101 (2004) C 2208, A 2730 (8 Oktober 2004)
- Factors influencing assignment of patients to compulsory admission. In: Social Psychiatry 21 (1986) 113-122
- Andreas Spengler (ed.): Institutsambulanzen in der psychiatrischen Versorgung. Vandenhoek und Ruprecht, Göttingen 1991, ISBN 3-525-45738-3.
- Psychiatrische Institutsambulanzen – ein Überblick. In: Nervenarzt 74 (2003), p. 476-478.
- Psychiatrische Institutsambulanzen. Leistungsfähig, bedarfsgerecht und innovativ. Deutsches Ärzteblatt 109 (40) A 1981–1983.
- Zwangseinweisungen in Deutschland – Basisdaten und Trends. In: Psychiatrische Praxis. 34 (2007), p. 191-195.
- Was geschehen ist – Das Beispiel Wunstorf. In: Nagel, E., C.Quarch, C.Begerau, C.v.Fritsch; Deutscher Evangelischer Kirchentag Hannover 2005. Dokumente. Gütersloher Verlagshaus.
- Spengler, A., S. Neuenhausen, L. Schlieckau: Kulturbüro der Landeshauptstadt Hannover (ed.): Elementarkräfte – Schaffen und Werk psychiatrieerfahrener Künstler über 100 Jahre. Psychiatrie-Verlag, Bonn 2010, ISBN 978-3-88414-599-9
- Spengler, A., M. Koller, D. Hesse: Die Klingebiel-Zelle. Leben und künstlerisches Schaffen eines Psychiatriepatienten. Vandenhoeck & Ruprecht, Göttingen 2013, ISBN 978-3-525-30043-5
- Spengler, A.: pictor doctus - Fünf Jahrzehnte Zeichnung und Malerei. Wunstorf 2017, ISBN 978-3-00-055610-4
