= Braunschweiger Zeitung =

German regional daily newspaper

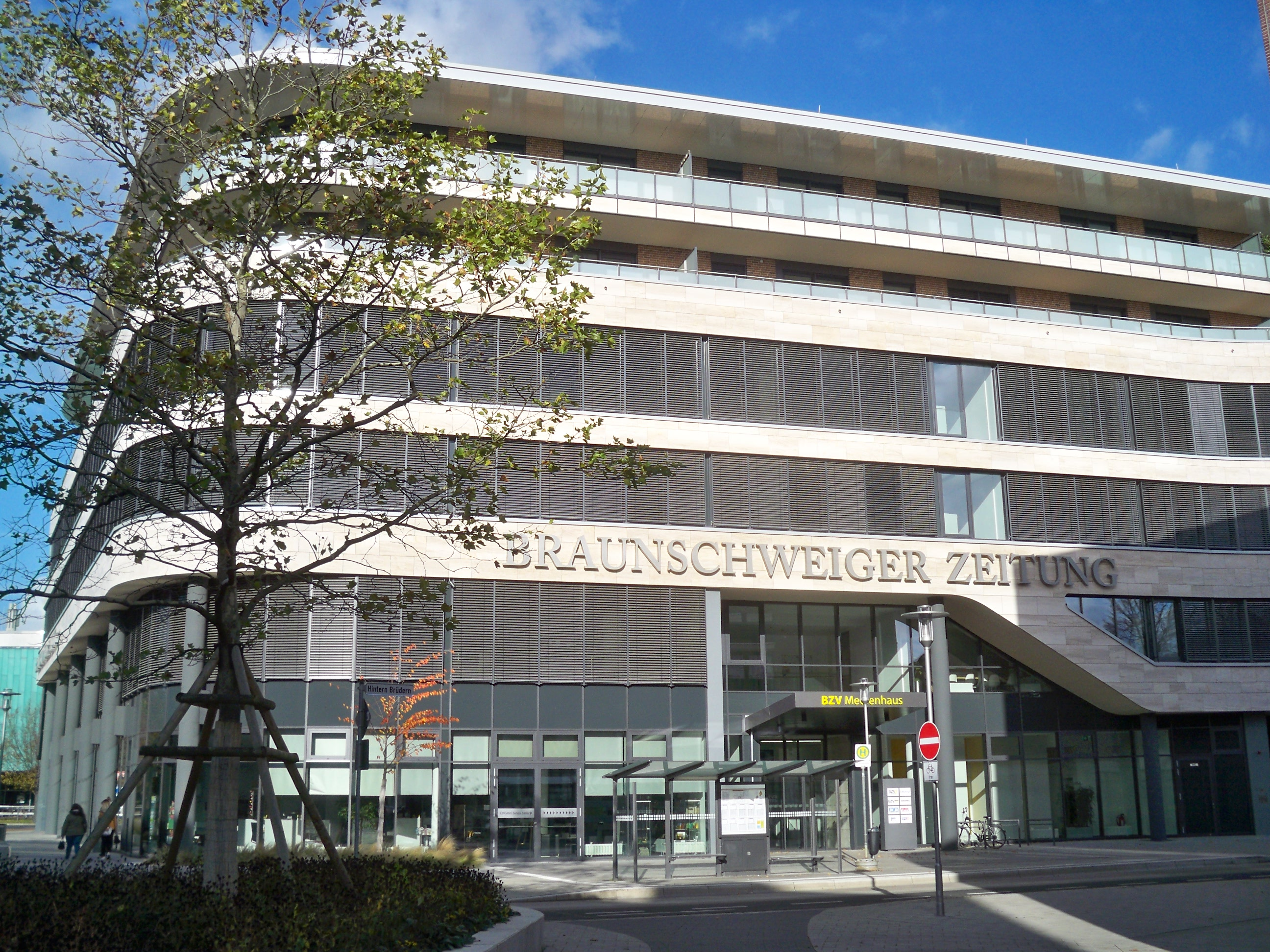
- BZV headquarters in Braunschweig
- Type: Daily regional newspaper
- Owner: BZV Medienhaus GmbH
- Editor: Armin Maus
- Founded: 8 January 1946; 80 years ago
- Language: German
- Headquarters: Braunschweig, Germany
- Circulation: 126,314
- Website: braunschweiger-zeitung.de

The Braunschweiger Zeitung is a daily regional newspaper serving Braunschweig, Germany and surrounding towns and villages in Brunswick Land. It is operated by the BZV Medienhaus GmbH, headquartered in Braunschweig.

== Local editions ==
There are seven local editions of the paper. Besides the main edition Braunschweiger Zeitung, local editions are published under the following titles:

- Gifhorner Rundschau
- Helmstedter Nachrichten
- Peiner Nachrichten
- Salzgitter-Zeitung
- Wolfenbütteler Zeitung
- Wolfsburger Nachrichten
