= 1984 German Formula Three Championship =

Seasons
- ← 1983 1985 →

The 1984 German Formula Three Championship (German: 1984 Deutsche Formel-3-Meisterschaft) was a multi-event motor racing championship for single-seat open wheel formula racing cars held in Germany, Belgium an Austria. The championship featured drivers competing in two-litre Formula Three racing cars which conformed to the technical regulations, or formula, for the championship. It commenced on 11 March at Zolder and ended at the same place on 21 October after twelve rounds.

Malte Bongers Motorsport driver Kurt Thiim won the championship battle. He was victorious at Zolder, Kaufbeuren, Nürburgring and Salzburgring. Volker Weidler lost 13 points to Thiim and finished as runner-up with wins at Mainz Finthen, Wunstorf and Zolder. Harald Brutschin and Cor Euser were the only other drivers who were able to win a race in the season.

== Teams and drivers ==
Entry List
Team	No.	Driver	Chassis	Engine	Rounds
(Austria) Scuderia Teutonia	1	(Austria) Franz Konrad	Anson SA4	Alfa Romeo	1–2, 4–12
(Austria) Scuderia Teutonia	2	(West Germany) Franz-Josef Prangemeier	March 803B/1	Toyota	1–2, 4–9, 11–12
(West Germany) Team Maredo Steak&Salat	3	(West Germany) Hans-Peter Pandur	Ralt RT3	Volkswagen	All
(West Germany) Volkswagen Motorsport	4	(West Germany) Volker Weidler	Ralt RT3/367	Volkswagen	All
(West Germany) Volkswagen Motorsport	5	(West Germany) Stefan Oberndorfer	Ralt RT3/399	Volkswagen	1–11
(West Germany) Uwe Teuscher	6	(West Germany) Uwe Teuscher	March 813	Toyota	1–6, 11
(West Germany) Lui McGregor Racing Team	7	(West Germany) Rudi Seher	Anson SA4/001	Alfa Romeo	1–6, 8–12
(West Germany) Lui McGregor Racing Team	8	(Switzerland) Dieter Heinzelmann	Anson SA4/017	Alfa Romeo	1–4, 6–11
(West Germany) Nicky Nufer	9	(West Germany) Nicky Nufer	Ralt RT3/202	Toyota	1–5, 7, 9, 11–12
(West Germany) Seat Deutschland Team	10	(West Germany) Jan Thoelke	Anson SA4/003	Volkswagen	1–6, 8–12
(West Germany) Seat Deutschland Team	16	(West Germany) Thomas von Löwis	Ralt RT3	Volkswagen	1–8, 10
(West Germany) Peter Wisskirchen	12	(West Germany) Peter Wisskirchen	Ralt RT3/433	Volkswagen	1–8, 10–12
(West Germany) Josef Kaufmann Racing	13	(West Germany) Josef Kaufmann	Martini MK39	Toyota	1
(West Germany) Josef Kaufmann Racing	13	(West Germany) Harald Becker	Martini MK42	Volkswagen	2–6
(West Germany) Josef Kaufmann Racing	13	(Netherlands) Cor Euser	Martini MK39	Toyota	7
(West Germany) Josef Kaufmann Racing	13	(West Germany) Harald Becker	Martini MK39	Toyota	8
(West Germany) Josef Kaufmann Racing	14	(West Germany) Harald Becker	Martini MK42	Volkswagen	1
(West Germany) Josef Kaufmann Racing	14	(West Germany) Josef Kaufmann	Martini MK39	Toyota	2
(West Germany) Josef Kaufmann Racing	14	(West Germany) Jürgen Kühn	Martini MK39	Toyota	3
(West Germany) Josef Kaufmann Racing	14	(Netherlands) Cor Euser	Martini MK39	Toyota	4–5
(West Germany) Josef Kaufmann Racing	14	(Netherlands) Cor Euser	Martini MK42	Volkswagen	8–9
(West Germany) Josef Kaufmann Racing	14	(West Germany) Josef Kaufmann	Martini MK42	Volkswagen	11–12
(West Germany) Josef Kaufmann Racing	47	(Netherlands) Cor Euser	Martini MK39	Toyota	6
(West Germany) Josef Kaufmann Racing	48	(West Germany) Karl-Heinz Wenig	Martini MK34/016	Toyota	6
(West Germany) Peter Katsarski	15	(West Germany) Peter Katsarski	Ralt RT3	Toyota	1–6, 8–9, 12
(West Germany) Andy Wietzke	17	(West Germany) Andy Wietzke	Anson SA3/005	Alfa Romeo	2–5, 7
(West Germany) Auto Hebben Motorsport	18	(West Germany) Manfred Hebben	Ralt RT3	Toyota	1–5, 7–8, 11–12
(West Germany) Auto Hebben Motorsport	19	(Finland) Heikki Mustonen	Ralt RT3	Toyota	1–2
(West Germany) Auto Hebben Motorsport	19	(West Germany) Karl-Heinz Soll	Ralt RT3	Toyota	7–9, 11
(West Germany) Auto Hebben Motorsport	19	(West Germany) Heinz Gilges	Ralt RT3	Toyota	12
(West Germany) Auto Hebben Motorsport	20	(West Germany) Karl-Heinz Soll	Ralt RT3	Toyota	3
(West Germany) Auto Hebben Motorsport	20	(West Germany) Heinz Gilges	Chevron B38	Toyota	4
(West Germany) Karl-Christian Lück	21	(West Germany) Karl-Christian Lück	Ralt RT3/411	Alfa Romeo	All
(West Germany) Malte Bongers Motorsport	22	(Denmark) Kurt Thiim	Ralt RT3/400	Alfa Romeo	All
(West Germany) Malte Bongers Motorsport	23	(Finland) Jari Nurminen	Ralt RT3	Alfa Romeo	All
(West Germany) Erwin Derichs	24	(West Germany) Wolfgang Kaufmann	Derichs D385/01	Toyota	1
(West Germany) Erwin Derichs	24	(West Germany) Jürgen von Gartzen	Derichs D385/01	Toyota	2–9
(West Germany) Erwin Derichs	24	(West Germany) Manfred Zimmermann	Derichs D385/01	Toyota	11
(West Germany) Erwin Derichs	24	(West Germany) Bernd Wicks	Derichs D385/01	Toyota	12
(West Germany) Erwin Derichs	25	(West Germany) Jürgen von Gartzen	Derichs D37/F3-78-02	Toyota	1
(West Germany) Erwin Derichs	25	(West Germany) Wolfgang Kaufmann	Derichs D385/02	Toyota	2, 6–7, 9–10, 12
(West Germany) Erwin Derichs	43	(West Germany) Pit Bilger	Derichs D385/02	Toyota	10
(Austria) Team Lechner Racing School	26	(West Germany) Harald Brutschin	Ralt RT3/484	Volkswagen	All
(Austria) Team Lechner Racing School	27	(West Germany) Thomas Holert	Ralt RT3	Volkswagen	1–2
(Austria) Team Lechner Racing School	27	(Austria) Ernst Franzmaier	Ralt RT3	Volkswagen	9, 11
(Austria) Team Lechner Racing School	27	(Austria) Walter Lechner	Ralt RT3	Volkswagen	12
(Austria) Team Lechner Racing School	42	(Austria) Ernst Franzmaier	Ralt RT3	Volkswagen	10
(Austria) Team Lechner Racing School	46	(Austria) Walter Lechner	Ralt RT3	Volkswagen	6
(Austria) Team Lechner Racing School	47	(Austria) Franz Tost	Ralt RT3	Volkswagen	11
(Switzerland) Hanspeter Kaufmann	28	(Switzerland) Hanspeter Kaufmann	Ralt RT3/398	Alfa Romeo	1–5, 9–11
(West Germany) Gernot Sirrenburg	29	(West Germany) Gernot Sirrenburg	Ralt RT3	Toyota	1, 5–6, 8–11
(Belgium) Maurice Roger	30	(Belgium) Maurice Roger	Chevron B47/47–79–02	Toyota	1–3
(West Germany) Heinrich Heintz	31	(West Germany) Heinrich Heintz	Ralt RT1/23	Toyota	3, 7
(Netherlands) Van Amersfoort Racing	32	(Netherlands) Hendrik ten Cate	Ralt RT3	Toyota	1–2, 12
(West Germany) Gerd Lünsmann	33	(West Germany) Gerd Lünsmann	Ralt RT3/236	Toyota	1–2, 4, 6–7, 11
(West Germany) Ralf Rauh	34	(West Germany) Ralf Rauh	Ralt RT3/300	Volkswagen	1–8
(West Germany) Otto Christmann	35	(West Germany) Otto Christmann	Martini MK31	Toyota	1–2, 4–5, 7, 9, 11
(West Germany) Alexander Seibold	36	(West Germany) Alexander Seibold	Anson SA3	Toyota	2, 4–5, 7–8
(West Germany) MSC Scuderia Mitwitz	38	(West Germany) Justin Sünkel	Argo JM10	Volkswagen	2–5, 7, 10
(West Germany) Penthouse Racing Team	39	(West Germany) Richard Hamann	Anson SA3/002	Toyota	1–6, 8–12
(West Germany) Artur Deutgen	41	(West Germany) Artur Deutgen	March 813	Toyota	1–2, 9, 11–12
(Switzerland) Formel Rennsport Club	41	(Switzerland) Bruno Huber	Argo JM1/006-F3	Toyota	5, 10
(West Germany) AC Mayen	42	(West Germany) Pit Bilger	Derichs D37/F3-78-02	Toyota	3–4, 6–7
(West Germany) Placido-Daniel Pardo	43	(West Germany) Placido-Daniel Pardo	Chevron B38/38–77–23	Toyota	4, 6–8, 11
(Switzerland) Barron Racing Team	43	(Switzerland) Urs Dudler	Ralt RT3	Toyota	11
(Sweden) Rewell	44	(Sweden) Christer Offason	Ralt RT3	Toyota	1
(West Germany) Pedrazza Motorsport	44	(West Germany) Erich Höhmann	Martini MK31	Toyota	9
(Belgium) Belgian Volkswagen Club	44	(Belgium) Éric Bachelart	Ralt RT3	Volkswagen	12
(Belgium) Belgian Volkswagen Club	45	(France) Bruno di Gioa	Ralt RT3	Volkswagen	9
(Belgium) Belgian Volkswagen Club	46	(Belgium) Marc Duez	Ralt RT3	Toyota	9
(West Germany) Essen Werdener AC	45	(West Germany) Friedrich Burgmann	March	Toyota	1, 3, 7, 9, 11–12
(Switzerland) Marcel Wettstein	45	(Switzerland) Marcel Wettstein	Argo JM10	Toyota	1–2, 4–6
(Switzerland) Formel Rennsport Club	46	(Switzerland) Jo Zeller	Ralt RT3/417	Toyota	11
(Belgium) Ecole Avia La Chatre	46	(Belgium) Eric van de Poele	Ralt RT3	Volkswagen	12
(Switzerland) Fredy Eschenmoser	47	(Switzerland) Fredy Eschenmoser	Ralt RT3/413	Alfa Romeo	3–5, 9–10, 12
(France) Ferdinand de Lesseps	47	(France) Ferdinand de Lesseps	Martini MK39	Alfa Romeo	12
(Belgium) Excelsior	49	(Belgium) Jacky Eeckelaert	Martini MK39	Alfa Romeo	12
(France) Martini Racing Oreca	51	(France) Bruno di Gioa	Martini MK42	Alfa Romeo	12
(France) Martini Racing Oreca	52	(France) Paul Belmondo	Martini MK42	Alfa Romeo	12
(West Germany) Mark Simon	52	(West Germany) Mark Simon	Ralt RT3	Volkswagen	1

== Calendar ==
Round	Location	Circuit	Date	Supporting
1	Heusden-Zolder, Belgium	Circuit Zolder	11 March	XV. AvD/MVBL "Bergischer Löwe"
2	Hockenheim, West Germany	Hockenheimring	17 March	ADAC/MCS "Preis der Stadt Stuttgart""
3	Berlin, West Germany	AVUS	13 May	ADAC-Avus-Rennen
4	Mainz, West Germany	Mainz-Finthen Airport	27 May	AvD/HMSC Flugplatzrennen Mainz-Finthen
5	Kaufbeuren, West Germany	Kaufbeuren Air Base	3 June	ADAC-Flugplatzrennen Kaufbeuren
6	Wunstorf, West Germany	Wunstorf Air Base	11 June	ADAC-Flugplatzrennen Wunstorf
7	Nürburg, West Germany	Nürburgring	16 June	XIX. ADAC-300-km-Rennen
8	Erding, West Germany	Erding Air Base	8 July	7. ADAC-Flugplatz-Rennen Erding
9	Heusden-Zolder, Belgium	Circuit Zolder	19 August	18. ADAC Westfalen-Pokal-Rennen
10	Salzburg, Austria	Salzburgring	26 August	ADAC-Alpentrophäe
11	Nürburg, West Germany	Nürburgring	23 September	XI. ADAC-Bilstein-Super-Sprint
12	Heusden-Zolder, Belgium	Circuit Zolder	21 October	ADAC/ACR-Saison-Finale Zolder

== Results ==
Round	Circuit	Pole position	Fastest lap	Winning driver	Winning team
1	(Belgium) Circuit Zolder	(West Germany) Volker Weidler	(Denmark) Kurt Thiim	(Denmark) Kurt Thiim	(West Germany) Malte Bongers Mootrsport
2	(West Germany) Hockenheimring	(West Germany) Harald Brutschin	(West Germany) Harald Brutschin	(West Germany) Harald Brutschin	(Austria) Team Lechner Racing School
3	(West Germany) AVUS	(West Germany) Harald Brutschin	(West Germany) Harald Brutschin	(West Germany) Harald Brutschin	(Austria) Team Lechner Racing School
4	(West Germany) Mainz-Finthen Airport	(West Germany) Volker Weidler	(West Germany) Volker Weidler	(West Germany) Volker Weidler	(West Germany) Volkswagen Motorsport
5	(West Germany) Kaufbeuren Air Base	(West Germany) Volker Weidler	(Denmark) Kurt Thiim	(Denmark) Kurt Thiim	(West Germany) Malte Bongers Mootrsport
6	(West Germany) Wunstorf Air Base	(West Germany) Volker Weidler	(West Germany) Volker Weidler	(West Germany) Volker Weidler	(West Germany) Volkswagen Motorsport
7	(West Germany) Nürburgring	(West Germany) Volker Weidler	(West Germany) Harald Brutschin	(Denmark) Kurt Thiim	(West Germany) Malte Bongers Mootrsport
8	(West Germany) Erding Air Base	(West Germany) Harald Brutschin	(West Germany) Volker Weidler	(West Germany) Harald Brutschin	(Austria) Team Lechner Racing School
9	(Belgium) Circuit Zolder	(Netherlands) Cor Euser	(Netherlands) Cor Euser	(Netherlands) Cor Euser	(West Germany) Josef Kaufmann Racing
10	(Austria) Salzburgring	(West Germany) Harald Brutschin	(West Germany) Volker Weidler	(Denmark) Kurt Thiim	(West Germany) Malte Bongers Mootrsport
11	(West Germany) Nürburgring	(West Germany) Hans-Peter Pandur	(Denmark) Kurt Thiim	(Denmark) Kurt Thiim	(West Germany) Malte Bongers Mootrsport
12	(Belgium) Circuit Zolder	(Denmark) Kurt Thiim	(West Germany) Josef Kaufmann	(West Germany) Volker Weidler	(West Germany) Volkswagen Motorsport

== Championship standings ==
- Points are awarded as follows:

1	2	3	4	5	6	7	8	9	10
20	15	12	10	8	6	4	3	2	1

Pos	Driver	ZOL1 (Belgium)	HOC (West Germany)	AVU (West Germany)	MAI (West Germany)	KAU (West Germany)	WUN (West Germany)	NÜR1 (West Germany)	ERD (West Germany)	ZOL2 (Belgium)	SAL (Austria)	NÜR2 (West Germany)	ZOL3 (Belgium)	Points
1	(Denmark) Kurt Thiim	1	4	5	9	1	2	1	2	3	1	1	**2**	167
2	(West Germany) Volker Weidler	**2**	3	3	**1**	**2**	**1**	**2**	7	Ret	2	4	1	154
3	(West Germany) Harald Brutschin	Ret	**1**	**1**	Ret	3	5	3	**1**	2	**3**	3	4	141
4	(West Germany) Hans-Peter Pandur	3	2	2	3	6	3	5	18	6	Ret	**Ret**	3	98
5	(Finland) Jari Nurminen	DNS	14	4	16	5	6	6	9	4	Ret	2	5	65
6	(Austria) Franz Konrad	4	5		Ret	25	4	4	5	DSQ	7	5	DNS	60
7	(Netherlands) Cor Euser				2	4	16	Ret	3	**1**				57
8	(West Germany) Rudi Seher	9	11	9	4	8	DNS		12	5	4	Ret	Ret	35
9	(West Germany) Peter Wisskirchen	15	DNS	23	Ret	7	10	7	4		5	13	9	31
10	(West Germany) Stefan Oberndorfer	20	10	10	5	20	8	10	6	7	Ret	Ret		24
11	(West Germany) Karl-Christian Lück	7	13	25	11	12	12	8	11	8	8	6	10	23
12	(West Germany) Ralf Rauh	DNQ	8	27	6	10	7	9	Ret					16
13	(West Germany) Harald Becker	5	9	8	Ret	24	DNS		Ret					13
14	(West Germany) Thomas von Löwis	21	Ret	7	Ret	11	9	11	8		9			12
15	(West Germany) Nicky Nufer	19	Ret	6	8	15		Ret		Ret		17	11	11
16	(Switzerland) Hanspeter Kaufmann	10	7	12	Ret	DNS				11	10	11		11
17	(West Germany) Josef Kaufmann	Ret	DNS									9	7	10
18	(West Germany) Jan Thoelke	Ret	6	26	Ret	9	22		10	DNS	DNS	DNS	16	9
19	(Netherlands) Hendrik ten Cate	6	17										12	7
20	(West Germany) Andy Wietzke		DNQ	DNS	7	17		14						4
21	(West Germany) Artur Deutgen	17	DNQ							12		10	15	4
22	(West Germany) Peter Katsarski	8	21	11	Ret	13	DNS		14	13			17	3
23	(West Germany) Richard Hamann	16	22	28	15	DNQ	Ret		13	15	11	12	19	2
24	(West Germany) Uwe Teuscher	Ret	12	15	10	Ret	11					14		1
	(West Germany) Otto Christmann	11	18		Ret	23		15		17		Ret		0
	(Switzerland) Marcel Wettstein	12	15		12	14	13							0
	(Switzerland) Fredy Eschenmoser			13	DNQ	DNQ				14	12		20	0
	(West Germany) Jürgen von Gartzen	DNQ	25	20	14	18	14	12	DNS	18				0
	(West Germany) Pit Bilger			14	DNQ		18	20			13			0
	(West Germany) Wolfgang Kaufmann	15	DNQ				20	13		16	Ret		21	0
	(West Germany) Alexander Seibold		DNQ		13	22		Ret	22					0
	(Sweden) Christer Offason	13												0
	(Switzerland) Dieter Heinzelmann	DNS	23	22	DNQ		Ret	21	21	19	14	16		0
	(West Germany) Karl-Heinz Wenig			18	17	16	15							0
	(West Germany) Gerd Lünsmann	DNS	24		DNQ		17	18				15		0
	(West Germany) Gernot Sirrenburg	DNQ				DNQ	Ret		15			20		0
	(West Germany) Manfred Hebben	Ret	DNQ	16	DNQ	21		Ret	19			Ret	DNS	0
	(West Germany) Karl-Heinz Soll			24				16	DNS	DNS		19		0
	(West Germany) Thomas Holert	Ret	16											0
	(West Germany) Erich Höhmann								16					0
	(West Germany) Franz-Josef Prangemeier	DNQ	DNQ		DNQ	DNQ	19	19	17	21		DNS	22	0
	(West Germany) Justin Sünkel		DNQ	29	DNQ	DNQ		17			Ret			0
	(West Germany) Jürgen Kühn			17										0
	(Finland) Heikki Mustonen	Ret	19	19										0
	(Switzerland) Bruno Huber					19					Ret			0
	(West Germany) Placido-Daniel Pardo				DNQ		21	22	20			22		0
	(West Germany) Friedrich Burgmann	DNQ		DNS				23		20		Ret	23	0
	(West Germany) Heinrich Heintz			21				24				21	24	0
	(Belgium) Maurice Roger	DNS	20	DNS										0
	(Austria) Walter Lechner						DNS						25	0
	(West Germany) Heinz Gilges				DNQ								26	0
	(West Germany) Mark Simon	Ret												0
	(West Germany) Reinhold Mölig			DNS	DNQ	DNQ								0
	(West Germany) Bert Diessner						DNS							0
	(Switzerland) Urs Hauenstein		DNQ											0
	(West Germany) Fritz Kalmbach		DNQ											0
	(Finland) Reima Södermann		DNQ											0
	(West Germany) Gerhard Claus				DNQ									0
	(West Germany) Peter Deuscher					DNQ								0
guest drivers ineligible to score points
	(Belgium) Marc Duez									4				0
	(Switzerland) Urs Dudler											7		0
	(Austria) Ernst Franzmaier									DNS	6	8		0
	(Belgium) Éric Bachelart												6	0
	(France) Paul Belmondo												8	0
	(France) Bruno di Gioa									10			14	0
	(Belgium) Eric van de Poele												14	0
	(West Germany) Manfred Zimmermann											18		0
	(France) Ferdinand de Lesseps												18	0
	(Austria) Franz Tost											Ret		0
	(Switzerland) Jo Zeller											Ret		0
	(Belgium) Jacky Eeckelaert												DNS	0
	(West Germany) Bernd Wicks												DNS	0
	(West Germany) Karl-Heinz Wieschalla												DNS	0
Pos	Driver	ZOL1 (Belgium)	HOC (West Germany)	AVU (West Germany)	MAI (West Germany)	KAU (West Germany)	WUN (West Germany)	NÜR1 (West Germany)	ERD (West Germany)	ZOL2 (Belgium)	SAL (Austria)	NÜR2 (West Germany)	ZOL3 (Belgium)	Points

Colour	Result
Gold	Winner
Silver	Second place
Bronze	Third place
Green	Points classification
Blue	Non-points classification
Blue	Non-classified finish (NC)
Purple	Retired, not classified (Ret)
Red	Did not qualify (DNQ)
Red	Did not pre-qualify (DNPQ)
Black	Disqualified (DSQ)
White	Did not start (DNS)
White	Withdrew (WD)
White	Race cancelled (C)
Blank	Did not practice (DNP)
Blank	Did not arrive (DNA)
Blank	Excluded (EX)

**Bold** – Pole
Italics – Fastest Lap
