= 1985 German Formula Three Championship =

Seasons
- ← 1984 1986 →

The 1985 German Formula Three Championship (German: 1985 Deutsche Rennwagen Meisterschaft Formel 3) was a multi-event motor racing championship for single-seat open wheel formula racing cars held in Germany, Belgium and Austria. The championship featured drivers competing in two-litre Formula Three racing cars which conformed to the technical regulations, or formula, for the championship. It commenced on 24 March at Zolder and ended at Nürburgring on 22 September after fourteen rounds.

Josef Kaufmann Racing driver Volker Weidler clinched the championship title. He won races at Wunstorf, AVUS, Erding, Norisring, Zolder and Siegerland. Kris Nissen lost 33 points to Weidler and finished as runner-up, scoring the same number of wins as Weidler. Nissen's teammate Adrian Campos completed top-three in the drivers' standings. Eric Bachelart and Jari Nurminen were the only other drivers who were able to win a race in the season.

== Teams and drivers ==
Entry List
Team	No.	Driver	Chassis	Engine	Rounds
(West Germany) Malte Bongers Motorsport	1	(Finland) Jari Nurminen	Ralt RT3/400	Volkswagen	All
(West Germany) Malte Bongers Motorsport	2	(Finland) Heikki Mustonen	Ralt RT30	Volkswagen	1–2
(West Germany) Malte Bongers Motorsport	2	(West Germany) Jörg van Ommen	Ralt RT30	Volkswagen	8–9
(West Germany) Malte Bongers Motorsport	2	(West Germany) Frank Biela	Ralt RT30	Volkswagen	11
(West Germany) Volkswagen Motorsport	4	(Denmark) Kris Nissen	Ralt RT30/522	Volkswagen	All
(West Germany) Volkswagen Motorsport	5	(Spain) Adrian Campos	Ralt RT30/529	Volkswagen	All
(Austria) Team Lechner Racing School	7	(Mexico) Alfonso Toledano	Ralt RT30	Volkswagen	1, 3
(Austria) Team Lechner Racing School	7	(Austria) Walter Lechner	Ralt RT30	Volkswagen	2
(Austria) Team Lechner Racing School	7	(Austria) Bartl Stadler	Ralt RT30	Volkswagen	5–6
(Austria) Team Lechner Racing School	7	(West Germany) Stefan Neuberger	Ralt RT30	Volkswagen	14
(Austria) Team Lechner Racing School	8	(Germany) Uwe Schäfer	Ralt RT3	Volkswagen	2
(Austria) Team Lechner Racing School	8	(Austria) Willi Schuster	Ralt RT3	Volkswagen	6
(Austria) Team Lechner Racing School	8	(West Germany) Delia Stegemann	Ralt RT30	Volkswagen	14
(Austria) Team Lechner Racing School	9	(West Germany) Heinz Beissler	Ralt RT3	Volkswagen	1
(Austria) Team Lechner Racing School	10	(Austria) Ernst Franzmaier	Ralt RT30	Volkswagen	6
(Austria) Team Lechner Racing School	10	(Switzerland) Rolf Kuhn	Ralt RT30	Volkswagen	3
(Austria) Team Lechner Racing School	10	(West Germany) Ralf Rauh	Ralt RT30	Volkswagen	4
(Mexico) Toledano Racing	7	(Mexico) Alfonso Toledano	Martini MK44/02	Volkswagen	10–11
(Austria) Franz Tost	9	(Austria) Franz Tost	Ralt RT3/397	Volkswagen	2–4, 6–12, 14
(Austria) Scuderia Teutonia	11	(West Germany) Günther Lüttecke	March 803B	Toyota	1–2
(Austria) Scuderia Teutonia	11	(Austria) Franz Konrad	Martini MK45	Volkswagen	3–8
(Austria) Scuderia Teutonia	11	(West Germany) Stefan Neuberger	Martini MK45	Volkswagen	9
(Austria) Scuderia Teutonia	12	(Austria) Franz Konrad	Anson SA4	Volkswagen	1–2
(Austria) Scuderia Teutonia	12	(West Germany) Günther Lüttecke	March 803B	Toyota	3–4
(Austria) Scuderia Teutonia	12	(West Germany) Karl-Heinz Wieschalla	Anson SA4	Volkswagen	9
(Austria) Scuderia Teutonia	12	(West Germany) Franz-Josef Prangemeier	Anson SA4	Volkswagen	11, 13–14
(West Germany) Josef Kaufmann Racing	14	(West Germany) Volker Weidler	Martini MK45/03	Volkswagen	1–12, 14
(West Germany) Josef Kaufmann Racing	15	(Austria) Bartl Stadler	Martini MK45	Volkswagen	7
(West Germany) Josef Kaufmann Racing	15	(Spain) Alfonso de Vinuesa	Martini MK45	Volkswagen	9, 11–14
(West Germany) Peter Wisskirchen	16	(West Germany) Peter Wisskirchen	Ralt RT30	Volkswagen	1–5, 7–14
(West Germany) McGregor Racing Team	17	(West Germany) Rudi Seher	Martini MK44	Volkswagen	All
(West Germany) McGregor Racing Team	18	(Switzerland) Dieter Heinzelmann	Anson SA4	Volkswagen	2–9, 11–12, 14
(West Germany) McGregor Racing Team	18	(West Germany) Sigi Betz	Anson SA4	Volkswagen	13
(West Germany) McGregor Racing Team	19	(West Germany) Franz-Josef Prangemeier	Anson SA4	Volkswagen	3–5, 7, 9–10
(West Germany) McGregor Racing Team	19	(West Germany) Artur Deutgen	Anson SA4	Volkswagen	6
(West Germany) McGregor Racing Team	19	(West Germany) Wilhelm F. Weber	Ralt RT3	Volkswagen	All
(West Germany) McGregor Racing Team	21	(West Germany) Wilhelm F. Weber	Ralt RT3	Volkswagen	10–14
(West Germany) McGregor Racing Team	56	(West Germany) Nicky Nufer	Anson SA4	Volkswagen	1–2
(West Germany) Karl-Christian Lück	20	(West Germany) Karl-Christian Lück	Ralt RT30	Alfa Romeo	All
(West Germany) Team Sonax Autopflege	21	(West Germany) Wilhelm F. Weber	Ralt RT3/367	Volkswagen	1–4, 6–9
(West Germany) Team Sonax Autopflege	22	(West Germany) Thomas von Löwis	Ralt RT3	Volkswagen	All
(West Germany) Team Sonax Autopflege	27	(West Germany) Uwe Teuscher	March 813	Toyota	11–14
(West Germany) Car Chic by MC+A Racing	28	(West Germany) Richard Hamann	Ralt RT3	Volkswagen	1–9, 12–14
(Switzerland) Hanspeter Kaufmann	24	(Switzerland) Hanspeter Kaufmann	Ralt RT3/398	Volkswagen	2–3, 7–9, 11, 13–14
(West Germany) Artur Deutgen	25	(West Germany) Artur Deutgen	March 813	Toyota	1–4, 7, 11
(West Germany) Ford Autoveri Motorsport	26	(West Germany) Peter Katsarski	Ralt RT3	Toyota	1–2, 4–5, 7–8
(West Germany) Uwe Teuscher	27	(West Germany) Uwe Teuscher	March 813	Toyota	1–2, 4–5, 7–8
(West Germany) Wolfgang Wendlinger	29	(West Germany) Wolfgang Wendlinger	Ralt RT3	Toyota	1–4, 7, 9–12, 14
(West Germany) Derichs Rennwagen	30	(West Germany) Bruno Stanjek	Derichs D385/02	Toyota	1–2
(West Germany) Derichs Rennwagen	31	(West Germany) Manfred Zimmermann	Derichs D385/01	Toyota	1–2
(West Germany) Bross Druck Chemie Racing	33	(Mexico) Alfonso Toledano	Martini MK44/02	Volkswagen	12–13
(West Germany) Bross Druck Chemie Racing	66	(West Germany) "Pietro Spazzola"	Martini MK44/02	Volkswagen	9
(West Germany) Otto Christmann	34	(West Germany) Otto Christmann	Martini MK35	Volkswagen	4, 7–9, 11, 13–14
(West Germany) Wolfgang Kaufmann	35	(West Germany) Wolfgang Kaufmann	Ralt RT3	Alfa Romeo	2–14
(Switzerland) Fredy Eschenmoser	36	(Switzerland) Fredy Eschenmoser	Anson SA6	Volkswagen	8–9, 12, 14
(West Germany) Karl-Heinz Wenig	37	(West Germany) Karl-Heinz Wenig	Martini MK39	Volkswagen	3–4, 8–11, 13–14
(West Germany) MSC Scuderia Mitwitz	40	(West Germany) Justin Sünkel	Argo JM10	Volkswagen	2–3, 6, 8–9, 11–12, 14
(West Germany) Alexander Seibold	41	(West Germany) Alexander Seibold	Anson SA3	Toyota	7, 9
(West Germany) BS Racing	45	(West Germany) Altfrid Heger	Ralt RT3/496	Volkswagen	All
(West Germany) BS Racing	46	(West Germany) Manuel Reuter	Ralt RT3/467	Volkswagen	All
(West Germany) Placido-Daniel Pardo	48	(West Germany) Placido-Daniel Pardo	Chevron B38/38–77–23	Toyota	3, 9
(Belgium) Belgian Volkswagen Club	49	(Belgium) Éric Bachelart	Ralt RT3	Volkswagen	1, 11
(Belgium) Belgian Volkswagen Club	65	(Belgium) Herve Roger	Ralt RT3	Volkswagen	11
(West Germany) Arnold Wagner	51	(West Germany) Jürgen von Gartzen	Ralt RT3	Volkswagen	2–3
(West Germany) Arnold Wagner	51	(West Germany) Arnold Wagner	Ralt RT3	Volkswagen	5, 9
(West Germany) Klaus Koch	52	(West Germany) Klaus Koch	March 813	Alfa Romeo	2–3, 9
(Switzerland) MST Oberland	53	(Switzerland) Beat Amacher	Ralt RT3	no data	9
(Switzerland) Formel Rennsport Club	54	(Switzerland) Gianni Bianchi	Ralt RT3/398	Volkswagen	8–9
(Switzerland) Formel Rennsport Club	55	(Switzerland) Rudolf Weckmann	Anson	Volkswagen	9
(Switzerland) Formel Rennsport Club	57	(Switzerland) Jo Zeller	Ralt RT3/417	Toyota	1, 3, 9
(Switzerland) Formel Rennsport Club	59	(Switzerland) Ernst Thurnherr	Ralt RT3/398	Alfa Romeo	14
(Switzerland) Formel Rennsport Club	63	(Switzerland) Urs Dudler	Ralt RT3	Toyota	6
(Switzerland) Team Decorplast	56	(Switzerland) Franz Hunkeler	Martini MK42	Alfa Romeo	9
(France) Serge Saulnier	57	(United States) Joe Ris	Martini Martini MK45	Alfa Romeo	14
(West Germany) Gerd Lünsmann	58	(West Germany) Gerd Lünsmann	Ralt RT3/236	Volkswagen	4, 8–11
(West Germany) Bayern Motorsport	59	(West Germany) Uwe Schäfer	Reynard 853}	Volkswagen	3, 5–11, 14
(Austria) Franz Theuermann	60	(Austria) Franz Binder	Ralt RT30/563	Volkswagen	4–8, 10
(Austria) Franz Theuermann	60	(Austria) "Pierre Chauvet"	Ralt RT30/563	Volkswagen	9, 13
(Sweden) F3 Magazine & Sport	61	(Sweden) Christer Offason	Ralt RT30/565	Volkswagen	10
(West Germany) Peter Deuscher	62	(West Germany) Peter Deuscher	Ralt RT3	Volkswagen	9
(West Germany) Sportauto Nigrin Nachwuchsförderung	63	(West Germany) Markus Oestreich	Martini MK45	Volkswagen	8
(Sweden) The Swedish Lions	63	(Sweden) Steven Andskaer	Ralt RT30	Volkswagen	9
(Sweden) Jo Lindström Racing	63	(Sweden) Joakim Lindström	Ralt RT30	Volkswagen	11
(France) Equipe Carmignon	64	(France) Gilles Lempereur	Martini MK45	Alfa Romeo	11
(West Germany) Sachs Sporting	65	(West Germany) Udo Wagenhäuser	no data		8

== Calendar ==
Round	Location	Circuit	Date	Supporting
1	Heusden-Zolder, Belgium	Circuit Zolder	24 March	XVI. AvD/MVBL "Bergischer Löwe"
2	Nürburg, West Germany	Nürburgring	7 April	XX. ADAC-300-km-Rennen
3	Hockenheim, West Germany	Hockenheimring	21 April	AvD Deutschland-Trophäe "Jim Clark Rennen"
4	Wunstorf, West Germany	Wunstorf	5 May	ADAC-Flugplatzrennen Wunstorf
5	Berlin, West Germany	AVUS	12 May	ADAC-Avus-Rennen
6	Zeltweg, Austria	Österreichring	26 May	ADAC-Hessen-Cup — Preis des Aichfeldes
7	Erding, West Germany	Erding	9 June	8. ADAC-Flugplatz-Rennen Erding
8	Nuremberg, West Germany	Norisring	30 June	ADAC-Norisring-Trophäe "200 Meilen von Nürnberg"
9	Hockenheim, West Germany	Hockenheimring	13 July	ADAC-1000-km-Rennen
10	Diepholz, West Germany	Diepholz Airfield Circuit	21 July	18. ADAC-Flugplatzrennen Diepholz
11	Heusden-Zolder, Belgium	Circuit Zolder	18 August	19. ADAC Westfalen-Pokal-Rennen
12	Salzburg, Austria	Salzburgring	1 September	ADAC-Alpentrophäe
13	Siegerland, West Germany	Siegerland Airport	8 September	8. ADAC-Siegerland-Flughafenrennen
14	Nürburg, West Germany	Nürburgring	22 September	XII. ADAC-Bilstein Super Sprint

== Results ==
Round	Circuit	Pole position	Fastest lap	Winning driver	Winning team
1	(Belgium) Circuit Zolder	(West Germany) Volker Weidler	(West Germany) Volker Weidler	(Belgium) Éric Bachelart	(Belgium) Belgian Volkswagen Club
2	(West Germany) Nürburgring	(West Germany) Volker Weidler	(West Germany) Volker Weidler	(Denmark) Kris Nissen	(West Germany) Volkswagen Motorsport
3	(West Germany) Hockenheimring	(Denmark) Kris Nissen	(Denmark) Kris Nissen	(Denmark) Kris Nissen	(West Germany) Volkswagen Motorsport
4	(West Germany) Wunstorf	(West Germany) Volker Weidler	(West Germany) Manuel Reuter	(West Germany) Volker Weidler	(West Germany) Josef Kaufmann Racing
5	(West Germany) AVUS	(West Germany) Volker Weidler	(Austria) Franz Konrad	(West Germany) Volker Weidler	(West Germany) Josef Kaufmann Racing
6	(Austria) Österreichring	(Denmark) Kris Nissen	(Denmark) Kris Nissen	(Denmark) Kris Nissen	(West Germany) Volkswagen Motorsport
7	(West Germany) Erding	(West Germany) Volker Weidler	(Denmark) Kris Nissen	(West Germany) Volker Weidler	(West Germany) Josef Kaufmann Racing
8	(West Germany) Norisring	(West Germany) Uwe Schäfer	(West Germany) Volker Weidler	(West Germany) Volker Weidler	(West Germany) Josef Kaufmann Racing
9	(West Germany) Hockenheimring	(West Germany) Uwe Schäfer	(West Germany) Uwe Schäfer	(Denmark) Kris Nissen	(West Germany) Volkswagen Motorsport
10	(West Germany) Diepholz Airfield Circuit	(Denmark) Kris Nissen	(West Germany) Volker Weidler	(Finland) Jari Nurminen	(West Germany) Malte Bongers Mootrsport
11	(Belgium) Circuit Zolder	(Denmark) Kris Nissen	(West Germany) Karl-Christian Lück	(West Germany) Volker Weidler	(West Germany) Josef Kaufmann Racing
12	(Austria) Salzburgring	(Denmark) Kris Nissen	(Denmark) Kris Nissen	(Denmark) Kris Nissen	(West Germany) Volkswagen Motorsport
13	(West Germany) Siegerland Airport	(West Germany) Volker Weidler	(West Germany) Volker Weidler	(West Germany) Volker Weidler	(West Germany) Josef Kaufmann Racing
14	(West Germany) Nürburgring	(Denmark) Kris Nissen	(Denmark) Kris Nissen	(Denmark) Kris Nissen	(West Germany) Volkswagen Motorsport

== Championship standings ==
- Points are awarded as follows:

1	2	3	4	5	6	7	8	9	10
20	15	12	10	8	6	4	3	2	1

Pos	Driver	ZOL1 (Belgium)	NÜR1 (West Germany)	HOC1 (West Germany)	WUN (West Germany)	AVU (West Germany)	ZEL (Austria)	ERD (West Germany)	NOR (West Germany)	HOC2 (West Germany)	DIE (West Germany)	ZOL2 (Belgium)	SAL (Austria)	SIE (West Germany)	NÜR2 (West Germany)	Points
1	(West Germany) Volker Weidler	**2**	**2**	2	**1**	**1**	2	**1**	1	Ret	Ret	1		**1**	2	195
2	(Denmark) Kris Nissen	DNS	1	**1**	21	Ret	**1**	3	2	1	**Ret**	**Ret**	**1**	2	**1**	162
3	(Spain) Adrian Campos	4	4	4	3	5	3	Ret	3	Ret	4	2	2	9	3	128
4	(West Germany) Manuel Reuter	DNS	3	3	2	2	9	2	6	4	2	DNQ	Ret	16	4	112
5	(Finland) Jari Nurminen	3	24	9	5	Ret	Ret	4	9	5	1	Ret	8	6	DNS	71
6	(Austria) Franz Konrad	5	Ret	10	DNS	6	5	DNS	8		9	3	3	5	7	64
7	(West Germany) Altfrid Heger	8	22	5	8	8	Ret	5	18	2	17	11	6	3	11	58
8	(West Germany) Rudi Seher	Ret	13	Ret	4	4	Ret	Ret	5	Ret	5	Ret	4	Ret	5	54
9	(West Germany) Wolfgang Kaufmann		7	18	Ret	3	10	17	11	Ret	3	6	10	7	6	46
10	(West Germany) Karl-Christian Lück	9	5	12	6	7	7	7	10	7	6	7	9	10	DNS	46
11	(Belgium) Eric Bachelart	1										4				30
12	(Switzerland) Hanspeter Kaufmann		8	6				6	Ret	DNS		8		4	DNS	28
13	(Mexico) Alfonso Toledano	7		8				Ret	12	Ret	7	5	17	DNS		19
14	(West Germany) Peter Wisskirchen	11	10	Ret	10	15		9	16	DNS	10	9	5	15	8	18
15	(West Germany) Thomas von Löwis	10	11	16	11		6	8	13	Ret	8	10	7	11	DNS	18
16	(West Germany) Jorg van Ommen								16	3						12
17	(Switzerland) Jo Zeller	6		13						6						12
18	(Austria) Bartl Stadler					11	4	19								10
19	(West Germany) Markus Oestreich								4							10
20	(West Germany) Uwe Schäfer		DNS	7			DSQ	Ret	**7**	**Ret**	DNS	18			Ret	8
21	(Austria) Walter Lechner		6													6
22	(Austria) Franz Binder				13	9	8	12	17		14					5
23	(Austria) Franz Tost		16	DNS	7		Ret	Ret	Ret	12	16	15	Ret		DNS	4
24	(West Germany) Wilhelm F. Weber	13	12	19	17		14	14	DNQ	8	13	14	12	17	DNS	3
25	(Spain) Alfonso de Vinuesa									Ret		Ret	15	8	DNS	3
26	(West Germany) Artur Deutgen	DNS	9	14	Ret		Ret	Ret		DNS		DNS				2
27	(West Germany) Richard Hamann	19	Ret	11	9	14	Ret	11	Ret	Ret			11	18	DNS	2
28	(West Germany) Gerd Lunsmann				12				14	9	12	Ret				2
29	(West Germany) Stefan Neuberger									Ret					9	2
30	(West Germany) Peter Katsarski	DNS	14		14	10		13	19							1
31	(West Germany) Uwe Teuscher	Ret	DNS		15	Ret		10	Ret			17	Ret	14	DNS	1
32	(West Germany) Wolfgang Wendlinger	14	18	17	DNS			15		10	15	16	Ret		DNS	1
33	(West Germany) Delia Stegemann														10	1
	(West Germany) Franz-Josef Prangemeier			Ret	18	13		18		DNS	11	21		19	15	0
	(West Germany) Alexander Seibold							Ret		11						0
	(Austria) Willi Schuster						11									0
	(Switzerland) Dieter Heinzelmann		17	21	Ret	12	12	Ret	DNQ	Ret		23	14		13	0
	(West Germany) Otto Christmann				16			16	Ret	Ret		13		12	DNS	0
	(West Germany) Nicky Nufer	12	Ret													0
	(Belgium) Herve Roger											12				0
	(Switzerland) Ernst Thurnherr														12	0
	(West Germany) Justin Sünkel		24	DNQ			13		Ret	13		20	16		DNS	0
	(West Germany) Karl-Heinz Wenig			22	20				DNQ	14	Ret	19		13	DNS	0
	(Switzerland) Fredy Eschenmoser								Ret	Ret			13		14	0
	(Finland) Heikki Mustonen	Ret	15													0
	(West Germany) Jürgen von Gartzen		Ret	15												0
	(Austria) Ernst Franzmaier						15									0
	(West Germany) Heinz Beissler	15														0
	(West Germany) Peter Deuscher									15						0
	(West Germany) Manfred Zimmermann	16	21													0
	(Switzerland) Gianni Bianchi								DNQ	16						0
	(West Germany) Bruno Stanjek	17	20													0
	(West Germany) Placido-Daniel Pardo			Ret						17						0
	(West Germany) Günther Lüttecke	18	DNS	DNQ	19											0
	(West Germany) Klaus Koch		19	20						DNS						0
	(Sweden) Joakim Lindström											22				0
	(Austria) "Pierre Chauvet"									Ret				Ret		0
	(West Germany) Arnold Wagner					Ret				DNS						0
	(Switzerland) Urs Dudler						Ret									0
	(West Germany) Karl-Heinz Wieschalla									Ret						0
	(Switzerland) Rudolf Weckmann									Ret						0
	(Switzerland) Franz Hunkeler									Ret						0
	(Sweden) Christer Offason										Ret					0
	(France) Gilles Lempereur											Ret				0
	(West Germany) Frank Biela											Ret				0
	(West Germany) Sigi Betz													Ret		0
	(Switzerland) Rolf Kuhn			DNS												0
	(West Germany) Ralf Rauh				DNS											0
	(Switzerland) Beat Amacher									DNS						0
	(Sweden) Steven Andskaer									DNS						0
	(West Germany) "Pietro Spazolla"									DNS						0
	(United States) Joe Ris														DNS	0
	(West Germany) Udo Wagenhäuser								DNQ							0
Pos	Driver	ZOL1 (Belgium)	NÜR1 (West Germany)	HOC1 (West Germany)	WUN (West Germany)	AVU (West Germany)	ZEL (Austria)	ERD (West Germany)	NOR (West Germany)	HOC2 (West Germany)	DIE (West Germany)	ZOL2 (Belgium)	SAL (Austria)	SIE (West Germany)	NÜR2 (West Germany)	Points

Colour	Result
Gold	Winner
Silver	Second place
Bronze	Third place
Green	Points classification
Blue	Non-points classification
Blue	Non-classified finish (NC)
Purple	Retired, not classified (Ret)
Red	Did not qualify (DNQ)
Red	Did not pre-qualify (DNPQ)
Black	Disqualified (DSQ)
White	Did not start (DNS)
White	Withdrew (WD)
White	Race cancelled (C)
Blank	Did not practice (DNP)
Blank	Did not arrive (DNA)
Blank	Excluded (EX)

**Bold** – Pole
Italics – Fastest Lap
