= 1986 German Formula Three Championship =

Multi-event motor racing championship

Champions
- Champion: Kris Nissen (DEN)

Seasons
- ← 1985 1987 →

The 1986 German Formula Three Championship (German: 1986 Deutsche Formel-3-Meisterschaft) was a multi-event motor racing championship for single-seat open wheel formula racing cars held in Germany, Belgium and Austria. The championship featured drivers competing in two-litre Formula Three racing cars which conformed to the technical regulations, or formula, for the championship. It commenced on 18 May at Zolder and ended at Nürburgring on 21 September after eleven rounds.

Volkswagen Motorsport (Bertram Schäfer Racing) driver Kris Nissen clinched the championship title. He won races at Zolder, Hockenheim and had a hat-trick at Nürburgring. Hanspeter Kaufmann lost 44 points to Nissen and finished as runner-up with a win in the penultimate round at Salzburgring. Víctor Rosso won at Norisring and Österreichring. Bernd Schneider, Alfonso de Vinuesa and Gregor Foitek were the other race winners.

== Teams and drivers ==
Entry List
Team	No.	Driver	Chassis	Engine	Rounds
(West Germany) Josef Kaufmann Racing	1	(West Germany) Markus Oestreich	Martini MK49	Volkswagen	All
(West Germany) Josef Kaufmann Racing	2	(West Germany) Manuel Reuter	Martini MK49	Volkswagen	1–5
(West Germany) Josef Kaufmann Racing	2	(West Germany) Otto Rensing	Martini MK49	Volkswagen	4–5, 7–11
(West Germany) Josef Kaufmann Racing	45	(West Germany) Andy Bovensiepen	Martini MK45	Volkswagen	11
(West Germany) Volkswagen Motorsport	3	(Denmark) Kris Nissen	Ralt RT30/614	Volkswagen	All
(West Germany) Volkswagen Motorsport	4	(West Germany) Peter Zakowski	Ralt RT30/608	Volkswagen	All
(West Germany) Malte Bongers Motorsport	5	(Spain) Alfonso de Vinuesa	Reynard 863	Volkswagen	1–5, 7–8, 11
(West Germany) Malte Bongers Motorsport	5	(Finland) Tomi Luhtanen	Reynard 863/040	Volkswagen	9–10
(West Germany) Malte Bongers Motorsport	6	(West Germany) Hellmut Mundas	Martini MK45	Volkswagen	2, 5
(West Germany) Malte Bongers Motorsport	6	(Denmark) Peter Elgaard	Martini MK45	Volkswagen	4
(West Germany) Malte Bongers Motorsport	6	(Norway) Dag Rosthe	Reynard 863	Volkswagen	9
(West Germany) Malte Bongers Motorsport	6	(West Germany) Richard Hamann	Reynard 863	Volkswagen	11
(West Germany) McGregor Racing Team	7	(West Germany) Sigi Betz	Martini MK44	Volkswagen	All
(West Germany) McGregor Racing Team	8	(West Germany) Frank Schmickler	Ralt RT30	Volkswagen	1–9, 11
(West Germany) McGregor Racing Team	8	(Switzerland) Dieter Heinzelmann	Ralt RT30	Volkswagen	10
(West Germany) Werner Schröder Racing	9	(West Germany) Delia Stegemann	Ralt RT30	Volkswagen	1–4, 7–11
(West Germany) Werner Schröder Racing	9	(West Germany) Jürgen von Gartzen	Ralt RT30	Volkswagen	7–8
(West Germany) Wolfgang Kaufmann	10	(West Germany) Wolfgang Kaufmann	Ralt RT30	Volkswagen	All
(Switzerland) Squadra Foitek	11	(Switzerland) Hanspeter Kaufmann	Dallara F386	Volkswagen	All
(Switzerland) Squadra Foitek	38	(Switzerland) Gregor Foitek	Dallara F386	Volkswagen	4–5, 7, 9
(West Germany) Bross Druck Chemie Racing	12	(Mexico) Alfonso Toledano	Reynard 863	Volkswagen	1–4, 6–7
(West Germany) Bross Druck Chemie Racing	12	(Denmark) Henrik Larsen	Reynard 863	Volkswagen	8
(West Germany) Bross Druck Chemie Racing	12	(West Germany) Stefan Neuberger	Reynard 863	Volkswagen	9, 11
(West Germany) Bross Druck Chemie Racing	12	(Canada) Pierre Bourque	Reynard 863	Volkswagen	10
(West Germany) Bross Druck Chemie Racing	39	(West Germany) Richard Hamann	Reynard 863	Volkswagen	1, 3–5, 7–10
(West Germany) Bross Druck Chemie Racing	39	(United Kingdom) David Coyne	Reynard 863	Volkswagen	6
(West Germany) Bross Druck Chemie Racing	40	(West Germany) Stefan Neuberger	Reynard 853	Volkswagen	1–6, 8
(West Germany) Bross Druck Chemie Racing	40	(West Germany) Helmut Bross	Reynard 853	Volkswagen	11
(West Germany) Bross Druck Chemie Racing	50	(Canada) Pierre Bourque	Reynard 863	Volkswagen	9
(West Germany) Team Pernod	14	(West Germany) Thomas von Löwis	Ralt RT30	Volkswagen	1, 3–10
(West Germany) Team Pernod	14	(Switzerland) Bruno Eichmann	Ralt RT30	Volkswagen	11
(West Germany) Team Bössinger Tresorbauwerke	15	(West Germany) Peter Wisskirchen	Ralt RT30	Volkswagen	1–4, 7–9, 11
(West Germany) Team Bössinger Tresorbauwerke	18	(West Germany) Wilhelm F. Weber	Ralt RT30/522	Volkswagen	1, 3–4, 6–11
(West Germany) Team Bössinger Tresorbauwerke	19	(West Germany) Richard Hamann	Ralt RT30	Volkswagen	2
(Austria) Walter Lechner Racing School	16	(West Germany) Franz Abraham	Ralt RT30	Alfa Romeo	All
(Austria) Sachs Sporting	17	(West Germany) Michael Kahnt	Ralt RT30	Alfa Romeo	4
(West Germany) Mönninghoff Racing Team	20	(West Germany) Artur Deutgen	Ralt RT30	Volkswagen	1–8, 11
(West Germany) Mönninghoff Racing Team	21	(West Germany) Franz-Josef Prangemeier	Ralt RT3/496	Volkswagen	1–5, 7–9, 11
(West Germany) Peter Katsarski	22	(West Germany) Peter Katsarski	Ralt RT30	Volkswagen	4–5, 8–9
(West Germany) Otto Christmann	25	(West Germany) Otto Christmann	Martini MK35	Volkswagen	2–3, 7
(West Germany) Keusgen Racing Team	27	(West Germany) Gerd Lünsmann	Ralt RT30/529	Volkswagen	1–5, 7–9, 11
(West Germany) Ralf Rauh	30	(West Germany) Ralf Rauh	Martini MK45	Volkswagen	1–3
(West Germany) Schübel Rennsport Int.	31	(Argentina) Víctor Rosso	Dallara F386	Volkswagen	All
(West Germany) Schübel Rennsport Int.	32	(Austria) Martin Ragginger	Dallara F386	Volkswagen	1–7, 9–10
(Denmark) Duckhams Oil Int.	33	(Denmark) Peter Elgaard	Ralt RT30	Volkswagen	1–3, 5–11
(West Germany) Bernd Schneider	34	(West Germany) Bernd Schneider	Reynard 863/039	Volkswagen	All
(West Germany) Michael Roppes	35	(West Germany) Michael Roppes	Ralt RT30	Volkswagen	All
(Belgium) SA Elevers-KTR Marlboro	41	(Norway) Harald Huysman	Ralt RT30/650	Volkswagen	1–3, 7–8
(West Germany) UFD Racing Team	43	(West Germany) Karl-Heinz Wenig	Ralt RT3	Volkswagen	1, 3
(Austria) Franz Theuermann	44	(Austria) Franz Binder	Ralt RT30/563	Volkswagen	1, 6, 10
(Austria) Adi Lechner	45	(Austria) Adi Lechner	Martini	Volkswagen	4–6
(United Kingdom) David Price Racing	45	(France) Paul Belmondo	Reynard 863	Alfa Romeo	8–9
(United Kingdom) David Price Racing	46	(France) Fabien Giroix	Reynard 863	Alfa Romeo	8–9
(United Kingdom) David Price Racing	47	(United Kingdom) Andrew Ridgeley	Reynard 863	Volkswagen	8–9
(Austria) Scuderia Teutonia	46	(West Germany) Mathias Arlt	Anson SA4	Volkswagen	1, 4, 11
(Sweden) HT Racing Sport	49	(Sweden) Hasse Thaung	Ralt RT30	Volkswagen	All
(Finland) OY Finlandia Racing	51	(Finland) Sami Pensala	Ralt RT30	Volkswagen	7

== Calendar ==
Round	Location	Circuit	Date	Supporting
1	Heusden-Zolder, Belgium	Circuit Zolder	18 May	20. ADAC Westfalen-Pokal-Rennen
2	Wunstorf, West Germany	Wunstorf	8 June	ADAC Flugplatzrennen Wunstorf
3	Hockenheim, West Germany	Hockenheimring	15 June	ADAC-Preis Hockenheim
4	Nuremberg, West Germany	Norisring	28 June	ADAC-Norisring-Trophäe "200 Meilen von Nürnberg"
5	Erding, West Germany	Erding	6 July	9. ADAC-Flugplatz-Rennen Erding
6	Zeltweg, Austria	Österreichring	13 July	ADAC-Hessen-Cup — Preis des Aichfeldes
7	Nürburg, West Germany	Nürburgring	20 July	ADAC Truck Grand-Prix
8	Heusden-Zolder, Belgium	Circuit Zolder	17 August	ADAC/ACR-Grenzland-Preis
9	Nürburg, West Germany	Nürburgring	23 August	32. ADAC Kouros 1000 km Rennen
10	Salzburg, Austria	Salzburgring	31 August	ADAC-Alpentrophäe
11	Nürburg, West Germany	Nürburgring	21 September	XIII. ADAC-Bilstein Super Sprint

== Results ==
Round	Circuit	Pole position	Fastest lap	Winning driver	Winning team
1	(Belgium) Circuit Zolder	(Denmark) Kris Nissen	(Switzerland) Hanspeter Kaufmann	(Denmark) Kris Nissen	(West Germany) Volkswagen Motorsport
2	(West Germany) Wunstorf	(Mexico) Alfonso Toledano	(Argentina) Víctor Rosso	(Spain) Alfonso de Vinuesa	(West Germany) Malte Bongers Motorsport
3	(West Germany) Hockenheimring	(Denmark) Kris Nissen	(Denmark) Kris Nissen	(Denmark) Kris Nissen	(West Germany) Volkswagen Motorsport
4	(West Germany) Norisring	(Argentina) Víctor Rosso	(West Germany) Manuel Reuter	(Argentina) Víctor Rosso	(West Germany) Schübel Rennsport Int.
5	(West Germany) Erding	(Switzerland) Gregor Foitek	(Switzerland) Gregor Foitek	(Switzerland) Gregor Foitek	(Switzerland) Squadra Foitek
6	(Austria) Österreichring	(Argentina) Víctor Rosso	(Argentina) Víctor Rosso	(Argentina) Víctor Rosso	(West Germany) Schübel Rennsport Int.
7	(West Germany) Nürburgring	(West Germany) Wolfgang Kaufmann	(West Germany) Bernd Schneider	(Denmark) Kris Nissen	(West Germany) Volkswagen Motorsport
8	(Belgium) Circuit Zolder	(West Germany) Bernd Schneider	(West Germany) Bernd Schneider	(West Germany) Bernd Schneider	(West Germany) Bernd Schneider
9	(West Germany) Nürburgring	(Denmark) Kris Nissen	(Finland) Tomi Luhtanen	(Denmark) Kris Nissen	(West Germany) Volkswagen Motorsport
10	(Austria) Salzburgring	(Denmark) Kris Nissen	(Argentina) Víctor Rosso	(Switzerland) Hanspeter Kaufmann	(Switzerland) Squadra Foitek
11	(West Germany) Nürburgring	(Denmark) Kris Nissen	(Denmark) Kris Nissen	(Denmark) Kris Nissen	(West Germany) Volkswagen Motorsport

== Championship standings ==
- Points are awarded as follows:

1	2	3	4	5	6	7	8	9	10
20	15	12	10	8	6	4	3	2	1

Pos	Driver	ZOL1 (Belgium)	WUN (West Germany)	HOC (West Germany)	NOR (West Germany)	ERD (West Germany)	ZEL (Austria)	NÜR1 (West Germany)	ZOL2 (Belgium)	NÜR2 (West Germany)	SAL (Austria)	NÜR3 (West Germany)	Points
1	(Denmark) Kris Nissen	**1**	8	**1**	Ret	2	6	1	12	**1**	**2**	**1**	139
2	(Switzerland) Hanspeter Kaufmann	3	4	2	4	Ret	2	8	6	7	1	Ret	95
3	(Argentina) Víctor Rosso	Ret	Ret	Ret	**1**	Ret	**1**	2	2	3	3	Ret	94
4	(West Germany) Bernd Schneider	Ret	9	4	3	3	5	3	**1**	4	5	Ret	94
5	(West Germany) Wolfgang Kaufmann	2	10	Ret	2	15	7	**Ret**	Ret	6	4	2	66
6	(West Germany) Otto Rensing				5	8		11	3	2	7	5	50
7	(Spain) Alfonso de Vinuesa	Ret	1	Ret	Ret	DNS		4	10			3	43
8	(West Germany) Markus Oestreich	4	Ret	7	DNQ	Ret	3	7	DNS	9	Ret	4	42
9	(Switzerland) Gregor Foitek				7	**1**		5		10			33
10	(West Germany) Manuel Reuter	Ret	2	3	6	DNS							33
11	(West Germany) Frank Schmickler	5	6	DSQ	12	10	8	6	8	16		6	33
12	(Austria) Martin Ragginger	8	3	8	9	9	9	10		Ret	DNS		25
13	(West Germany) Stefan Neuberger	6	Ret	Ret	8	4	Ret		11	8		17	22
14	(West Germany) Peter Zakowski	11	11	6	20	5	11	Ret	Ret	Ret	DNS	Ret	14
15	(Finland) Tomi Luhtanen									5	6		14
16	(Norway) Harald Huysman	7	Ret	Ret				9	5				14
17	(West Germany) Franz Abraham	15	5	Ret	13	7	12	Ret	DNS	18	DNS	Ret	12
18	(United Kingdom) David Coyne						4				DNS		10
19	(France) Paul Belmondo								4	12			10
20	(West Germany) Artur Deutgen	Ret	17	Ret	11	6	10	Ret	19			10	8
21	(West Germany) Michael Roppes	Ret	Ret	9	Ret	11	DNS	16	7	14	9	Ret	8
22	(Denmark) Peter Elgaard	Ret	DNS	Ret	10	Ret	Ret	Ret	13	17	8	8	7
23	(West Germany) Ralf Rauh	Ret	7	Ret									4
24	(West Germany) Andy Bovensiepen											7	4
25	(West Germany) Thomas von Löwis	9		10	21	Ret	14	21	14	Ret	17		3
26	(Denmark) Henrik Larsen								9				2
27	(Switzerland) Bruno Eichmann											9	2
28	(West Germany) Peter Wisskirchen	10	13	Ret	Ret			18	DNS	19		Ret	1
29	(Austria) Franz Binder	12					13				10		1
	(West Germany) Wilhelm F. Weber	17		12	17		15	22	16	23	12	11	0
	(West Germany) Gerd Lünsmann	14	Ret	11	15	13		23	18	26		13	0
	(West Germany) Richard Hamann	13	Ret	Ret	DNQ	Ret		15		15	11	Ret	0
	(France) Fabien Giroix								DNS	11			0
	(West Germany) Sigi Betz	Ret	Ret	DNS	Ret	DNS		19	17	22	13	12	0
	(Mexico) Alfonso Toledano	Ret	**Ret**	Ret	14		16	12					0
	(West Germany) Hellmut Mundas		12			12							0
	(West Germany) Karl-Heinz Wenig	Ret		13									0
	(Finland) Sami Pensala							13					0
	(Sweden) Hasse Thaung									13			0
	(West Germany) Franz-Josef Prangemeier	18	16	14	DNQ	14		20	DNS	Ret		14	0
	(West Germany) Otto Christmann		14	DNS				24					0
	(West Germany) Jürgen von Gartzen							14	DNS				0
	(Switzerland) Dieter Heinzelmann										14		0
	(West Germany) Delia Stegemann	19	15	15	18			17	15	24	16	15	0
	(Canada) Pierre Bourque									DNS	15		0
	(West Germany) Mathias Arlt	16			16							16	0
	(Austria) Adi Lechner				DNQ	Ret	17						0
	(West Germany) Michael Kahnt				19								0
	(United Kingdom) Andrew Ridgeley								Ret	20			0
	(Norway) Dag Rosthe									21			0
	(West Germany) Peter Katsarski				DNQ	DNS			Ret	25			0
	(West Germany) Helmut Bross											Ret	0
	(West Germany) Justin Sünkel		DNS		DNQ								0
	(West Germany) Stefan Oberndorfer	DNQ											0
	(Switzerland) Gianni Bianchi				DNQ								0
Pos	Driver	ZOL1 (Belgium)	WUN (West Germany)	HOC (West Germany)	NOR (West Germany)	ERD (West Germany)	ZEL (Austria)	NÜR1 (West Germany)	ZOL2 (Belgium)	NÜR2 (West Germany)	SAL (Austria)	NÜR3 (West Germany)	Points

Colour	Result
Gold	Winner
Silver	Second place
Bronze	Third place
Green	Points classification
Blue	Non-points classification
Blue	Non-classified finish (NC)
Purple	Retired, not classified (Ret)
Red	Did not qualify (DNQ)
Red	Did not pre-qualify (DNPQ)
Black	Disqualified (DSQ)
White	Did not start (DNS)
White	Withdrew (WD)
White	Race cancelled (C)
Blank	Did not practice (DNP)
Blank	Did not arrive (DNA)
Blank	Excluded (EX)

**Bold** – Pole
Italics – Fastest Lap
