= 2000 Deutsche Tourenwagen Masters =

German touring car championship season

Champions
- Drivers' Champion: Bernd Schneider
- Teams' Champion: HWA Team I

Seasons
- ← 1996 2001 →

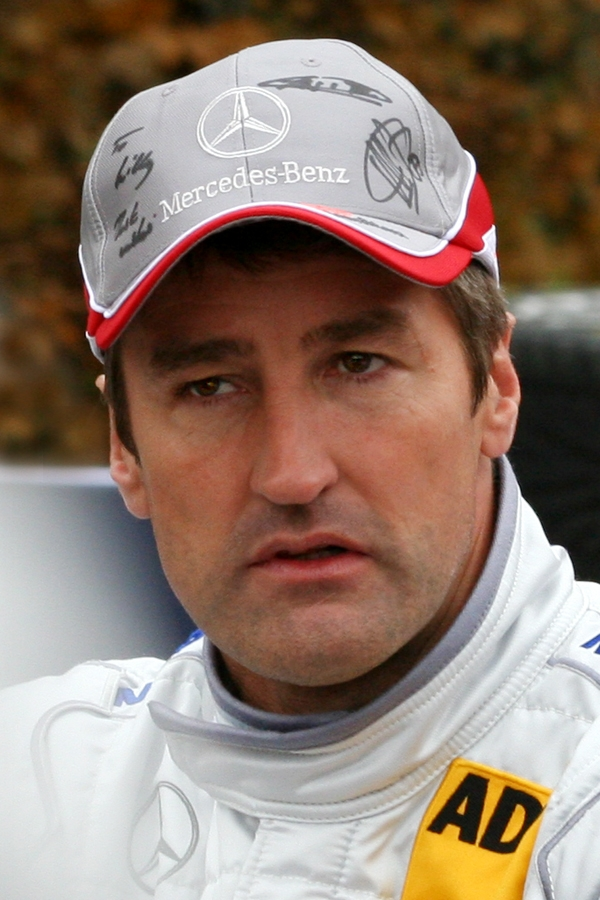
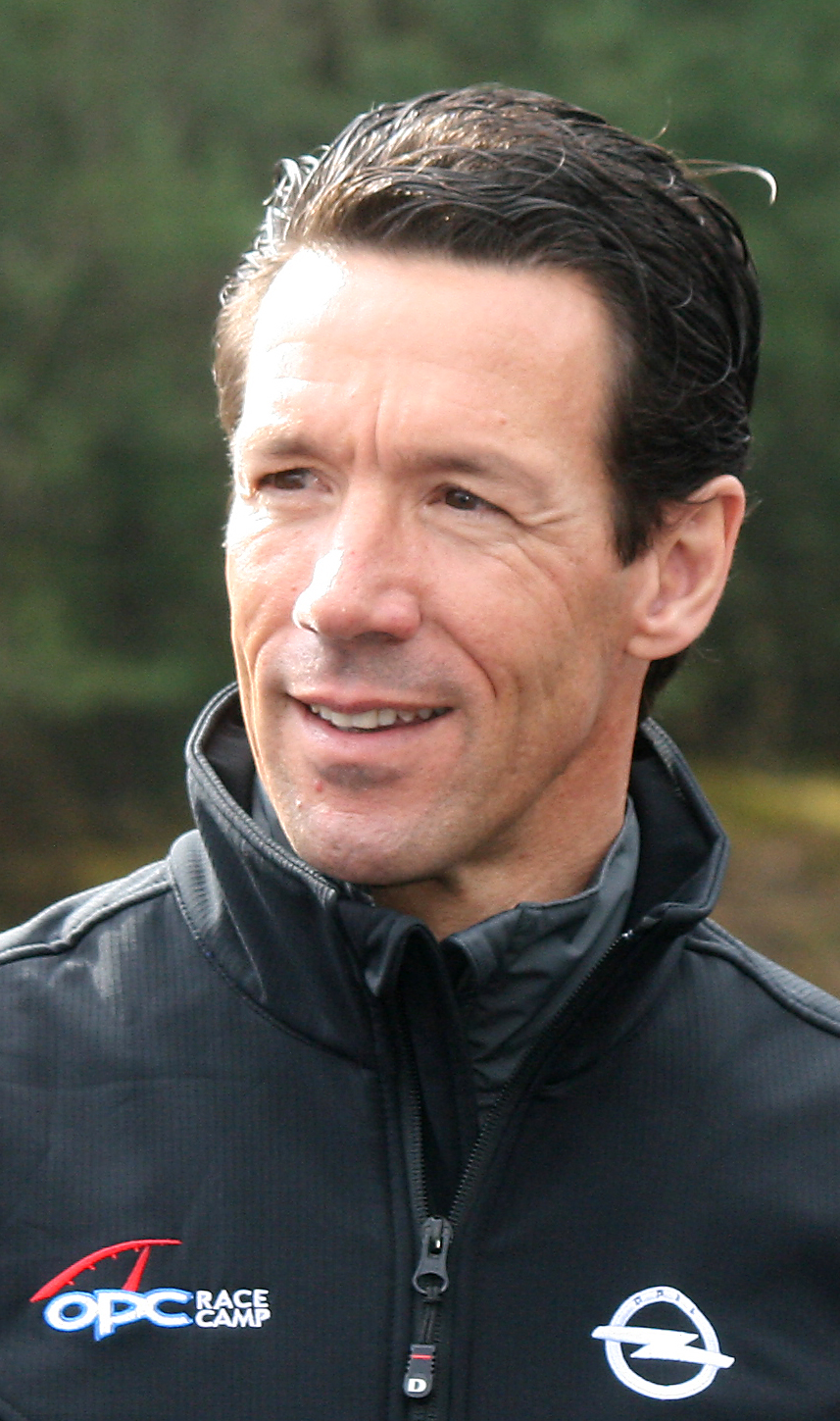
Bernd Schneider (left) won his first Deutsche Tourenwagen Masters Drivers' Championship while Manuel Reuter (right) finished second in the championship.

The 2000 Deutsche Tourenwagen Masters was the fourteenth season of premier German touring car championship and also first season under the moniker of Deutsche Tourenwagen Masters since the original series' demise in 1996. Nine events were held with two 40-minute races at each racing weekend.

== Pre-season ==
This was the resurrected DTM's first season since the cancellation of the Deutsche Tourenwagen Meisterschaft at the end of 1996. Mercedes returned to the series after their unfortunate CLR Le Mans project along with H.W.A GmbH and AMG. They were joined by Opel, who brought along the Holzer, Phoenix, Irmscher and Euroteam from the German Super Touring Championship (STW) where they had raced in 1999. The resumption of DTM also meant the end of STW. Audi did not enter, but was still represented through the semi-independent Abt Sportsline team. Two additional teams also ran Mercedes; they were Persson Motorsport and Team Rosberg.

== New for 2000 season ==
=== Regulations ===
2000 saw the Championship's regulations restricted to a certain degree, although Mercedes used their Le Mans experience to develop their machine. Opel opted to enter cars based on their Super Tourenwagen Cup, while Abt developed the Audi TT-R on their own initiative, albeit with a assistance from Audi.

==== Technical ====
The cars were all made to run 4.0-liter naturally-aspirated DOHC V8 engines (similar to Indy Racing League in 1997-1999), with power restricted through air restrictors, a principle used in every DTM season to keep costs down. All DTM entrants were required to utilize the GT coupé-style machinery.

All DTM cars would utilized the Bosch technological packages such as ECU, spark plugs, sensors, wipers, alternators and injectors from 2000 season onwards. In addition, Bosch also supplying appliances and tools for all DTM entrants and promoters.

==== Sporting ====
The new Championship saw the use of a new scoring system, with 20 points awarded to the winner of each race. Second would receive 15, third 12 and fourth ten with the following drivers given 8, 6, 4, 3, 2, and 1 respectively. The final point would be awarded to the driver who finished tenth, with no variation of point scores in either race of the weekend.

The full points scoring system for the 2000 DTM campaign is outlined below:

2000 DTM Championship Race Points
1st	2nd	3rd	4th	5th	6th	7th	8th	9th	10th
20	15	12	10	8	6	4	3	2	1

Pole position and fastest lap were recognised achievements during the season, although they would not be awarded points unlike other series at the time.

== Teams and drivers ==
The following manufacturers, teams and drivers competed in the 2000 Deutsche Tourenwagen Masters. All teams competed with tyres supplied by Dunlop.

Manufacturer	Car	Team	No.	Drivers	Rounds
Mercedes-Benz	AMG-Mercedes CLK-DTM 2000	HWA 1	1	(Germany) Bernd Schneider	All
Mercedes-Benz	AMG-Mercedes CLK-DTM 2000	HWA 1	2	(Germany) Thomas Jäger	All
Mercedes-Benz	AMG-Mercedes CLK-DTM 2000	HWA 2	5	(Germany) Klaus Ludwig	All
Mercedes-Benz	AMG-Mercedes CLK-DTM 2000	HWA 2	6	(Switzerland) Marcel Fässler	All
Mercedes-Benz	AMG-Mercedes CLK-DTM 2000	Team Rosberg	14	(Portugal) Pedro Lamy	1–2
Mercedes-Benz	AMG-Mercedes CLK-DTM 2000	Team Rosberg	24	(Portugal) Pedro Lamy	3–10
Mercedes-Benz	AMG-Mercedes CLK-DTM 2000	Team Rosberg	15	(United Kingdom) Darren Turner	1–2
Mercedes-Benz	AMG-Mercedes CLK-DTM 2000	Team Rosberg	42	(United Kingdom) Darren Turner	3–10
Mercedes-Benz	AMG-Mercedes CLK-DTM 2000	Persson Motorsport	18	(Germany) Marcel Tiemann	All
Mercedes-Benz	AMG-Mercedes CLK-DTM 2000	Persson Motorsport	19	(United Kingdom) Peter Dumbreck	All
Opel	Opel Astra V8 Coupé DTM 2000	Opel Team Holzer 1	3	(Germany) Uwe Alzen	All
Opel	Opel Astra V8 Coupé DTM 2000	Opel Team Holzer 1	4	(Germany) Joachim Winkelhock	All
Opel	Opel Astra V8 Coupé DTM 2000	Opel Team Phoenix	7	(Germany) Manuel Reuter	All
Opel	Opel Astra V8 Coupé DTM 2000	Opel Team Phoenix	8	(Germany) Michael Bartels	All
Opel	Opel Astra V8 Coupé DTM 2000	Opel Team Holzer 2	11	(France) Éric Hélary	All
Opel	Opel Astra V8 Coupé DTM 2000	Opel Team Holzer 2	17	(Germany) Timo Scheider	All
Opel	Opel Astra V8 Coupé DTM 2000	Opel Team Irmscher	12	(Germany) Christian Menzel	All
Opel	Opel Astra V8 Coupé DTM 2000	Euroteam	16	(Italy) Stefano Modena	All
Audi^{1}	Abt-Audi TT-R 2000	Abt Sportsline 1	9	(France) Laurent Aïello	1, 3–10
Audi^{1}	Abt-Audi TT-R 2000	Abt Sportsline 1	10	(Germany) Christian Abt	1, 3–10
Audi^{1}	Abt-Audi TT-R 2000	Abt Sportsline 1	23	(Germany) Roland Asch	2
Audi^{1}	Abt-Audi TT-R 2000	Abt Sportsline 2	20	(Denmark) Kris Nissen	All
Audi^{1}	Abt-Audi TT-R 2000	Abt Sportsline 2	21	(United Kingdom) James Thompson	2, 5–10

1. – Audi did not enter as a manufacturer but Abt Sportsline entered as a semi-independent team.

== Race calendar and winners ==
All races were held in Germany. Each weekend feature two 100 km races, with equal points scales.

Round	Circuit	Date	Pole position	Fastest lap	Winning driver	Winning team	Winning manufacturer
1	Hockenheimring	28 May	(Germany) Bernd Schneider	(Germany) Bernd Schneider	(Germany) Bernd Schneider	HWA 1	Mercedes-Benz
1	Hockenheimring	28 May		(Germany) Bernd Schneider	(Germany) Bernd Schneider	HWA 1	Mercedes-Benz
2	Motorsport Arena Oschersleben	18 June	(Germany) Manuel Reuter	(Germany) Bernd Schneider	(Germany) Manuel Reuter	Opel Team Phoenix	Opel
2	Motorsport Arena Oschersleben	18 June		(Germany) Manuel Reuter	(Germany) Manuel Reuter	Opel Team Phoenix	Opel
3	Norisring	9 July	(Germany) Joachim Winkelhock	(Germany) Christian Menzel	(Germany) Joachim Winkelhock	Opel Team Holzer 1	Opel
3	Norisring	9 July		(France) Éric Hélary	(Germany) Bernd Schneider	HWA 1	Mercedes-Benz
4	Sachsenring	6 August	(Germany) Klaus Ludwig	(Switzerland) Marcel Fässler	(Germany) Klaus Ludwig	HWA 2	Mercedes-Benz
4	Sachsenring	6 August		(Germany) Bernd Schneider	(Germany) Klaus Ludwig	HWA 2	Mercedes-Benz
5	Nürburgring	20 August	(Germany) Bernd Schneider	(Germany) Bernd Schneider	(Germany) Bernd Schneider	HWA 1	Mercedes-Benz
5	Nürburgring	20 August		(Germany) Bernd Schneider	(Germany) Bernd Schneider	HWA 1	Mercedes-Benz
6	Lausitzring	3 September	(Germany) Bernd Schneider	Event cancelled due to monsoon conditions			
7	Motorsport Arena Oschersleben	24 September	(Germany) Bernd Schneider	(Germany) Bernd Schneider	(Germany) Uwe Alzen	Opel Team Holzer 1	Opel
7	Motorsport Arena Oschersleben	24 September		(Germany) Bernd Schneider	(Germany) Bernd Schneider	HWA 1	Mercedes-Benz
8	Nürburgring	8 October	(Germany) Joachim Winkelhock	(Germany) Uwe Alzen	(Germany) Manuel Reuter	Opel Team Phoenix	Opel
8	Nürburgring	8 October		(Germany) Joachim Winkelhock	(Germany) Manuel Reuter	Opel Team Phoenix	Opel
9	Hockenheimring	29 October	(Germany) Manuel Reuter	(Germany) Manuel Reuter	(Germany) Uwe Alzen	Opel Team Holzer 1	Opel
9	Hockenheimring	29 October		(Germany) Bernd Schneider	(Germany) Uwe Alzen	Opel Team Holzer 1	Opel

== Drivers' championship ==
Pos	Driver	HOC1		OSC1		NOR		SAC		NÜR1		LAU		OSC2		NÜR2		HOC2		Pts
1	(Germany) Bernd Schneider	**1**	**1**	3	12	4	1	3	3	**1**	**1**	**C**	C	**2**	1	2	4	2	NC	221
2	(Germany) Manuel Reuter	3	13	**1**	**1**	3	2	13†	11	5	5	C	C	3	2	1	**1**	**16**	Ret	162
3	(Germany) Klaus Ludwig	9	9	8	11	2	3	**1**	**1**	2	2	C	C	6	3	12	Ret	Ret	11	122
4	(Switzerland) Marcel Fässler	2	2	9	3	13	7	10	4	3	3	C	C	NC	12	4	2	5	Ret	116
5	(Germany) Joachim Winkelhock	10	6	2	2	**1**	**4**	Ret	10	9	19	C	C	NC	Ret	**5**	5	3	2	113
6	(Germany) Uwe Alzen	Ret	DNS	Ret	9	8	6	Ret	Ret	10	13	C	C	1	**4**	3	6	1	**1**	100
7	(Germany) Michael Bartels	8	3	18	Ret	5	5	6	6	14	10	C	C	7	5	6	8	4	3	87
8	(United Kingdom) Peter Dumbreck	5	5	11	5	14	9	2	2	6	12	C	C	NC	6	10	9	7	Ret	75
9	(France) Éric Hélary	Ret	7	4	10	15	15	4	16†	8	7	C	C	4	10	14	Ret	6	7	53
10	(Germany) Marcel Tiemann	6	12	10	6	6	Ret	5	5	13	6	C	C	NC	7	18	12	15	5	53
11	(Germany) Thomas Jäger	7	14	6	4	7	13	NC	9	7	17	C	C	DNS	8	7	3	12	8	52
12	(Germany) Timo Scheider	4	4	5	7	12	11	7	7	16	11	C	C	8	9	11	16	11	Ret	45
13	(Portugal) Pedro Lamy	11	Ret	7	8	9	8	NC	12	4	4	C	C	DNS	DNS	8	13	8	10	39
14	(United Kingdom) Darren Turner	12	8	13	Ret	11	12	8	8	15	8	C	C	DNS	DNS	13	11	10	6	19
15	(Italy) Stefano Modena	13	10	12	Ret	10	10	14	Ret	19	15	C	C	Ret	DNS	Ret	DNS	9	4	15
16	(France) Laurent Aïello	15	DNS			Ret	DNS	12	14	11	14	C	C	5	11	9	7	Ret	DNS	14
17	(Germany) Christian Menzel	14	11	14	Ret	16	Ret	9	13	17	9	C	C	Ret	Ret	17	10	Ret	DNS	5
18	(United Kingdom) James Thompson			17	DNS					12	16	C	C	9	Ret	15	Ret	13	9	4
19	(Germany) Christian Abt	Ret	Ret			Ret	DNS	Ret	DNS	18	18	C	C	10	Ret	19	14	Ret	Ret	1
20	(Denmark) Kris Nissen	16	Ret	16	13†	Ret	14	11	15	Ret	Ret	C	C	11	Ret	16	15	14	Ret	0
21	(Germany) Roland Asch			15	Ret															0
Pos	Driver	HOC1		OSC1		NOR		SAC		NÜR1		LAU		OSC2		NÜR2		HOC2		Pts

Colour	Result
Gold	Winner
Silver	Second place
Bronze	Third place
Green	Points classification
Blue	Non-points classification
Blue	Non-classified finish (NC)
Purple	Retired, not classified (Ret)
Red	Did not qualify (DNQ)
Red	Did not pre-qualify (DNPQ)
Black	Disqualified (DSQ)
White	Did not start (DNS)
White	Withdrew (WD)
White	Race cancelled (C)
Blank	Did not practice (DNP)
Blank	Did not arrive (DNA)
Blank	Excluded (EX)

**Bold** – Pole
Italics – Fastest Lap

† Drivers did not finish the race, but were classified as they completed over 90% of the race distance.

=== Teams' Championship ===
Pos	Team	Car No.	HOC1		OSC1		NOR		SAC		NÜR1		LAU		OSC2		NÜR2		HOC2		Points
1	D2 AMG-Mercedes	1	**1**	**1**	3	12	4	1	3	3	**1**	**1**	**C**	C	**2**	1	2	4	2	NC	273
1	D2 AMG-Mercedes	2	7	14	6	4	7	13	NC	9	7	17	C	C	DNS	8	7	3	12	8	273
2	Opel-Team Phoenix	7	3	13	**1**	**1**	3	2	13†	11	5	5	C	C	3	2	1	**1**	**16**	Ret	249
2	Opel-Team Phoenix	8	8	3	18	Ret	5	5	6	6	14	10	C	C	7	5	6	8	4	3	249
3	Warsteiner AMG-Mercedes	5	9	9	8	11	2	3	**1**	**1**	2	2	C	C	6	3	12	Ret	Ret	11	238
3	Warsteiner AMG-Mercedes	6	2	2	9	3	13	7	10	4	3	3	C	C	NC	12	4	2	5	Ret	238
4	Opel-Team Holzer 1	3	Ret	DNS	Ret	9	8	6	Ret	Ret	10	13	C	C	1	**4**	3	6	1	**1**	213
4	Opel-Team Holzer 1	4	10	6	2	2	**1**	**4**	Ret	10	9	19	C	C	NC	Ret	**5**	5	3	2	213
5	Original Teile AMG-Mercedes	18	6	12	10	6	6	Ret	5	5	13	6	C	C	NC	7	18	12	15	5	128
5	Original Teile AMG-Mercedes	19	5	5	11	5	14	9	2	2	6	12	C	C	NC	6	10	9	7	Ret	128
6	Opel-Team Holzer 2	11	Ret	7	4	10	15	15	4	16†	8	7	C	C	4	10	14	Ret	6	7	98
6	Opel-Team Holzer 2	17	4	4	5	7	12	11	7	7	16	11	C	C	8	9	11	16	11	Ret	98
7	24h Service AMG-Mercedes	14	11	Ret	7	8	9	8	NC	12	4	4	C	C	DNS	DNS	8	13	8	10	58
7	24h Service AMG-Mercedes	15	12	8	13	Ret	11	12	8	8	15	8	C	C	DNS	DNS	13	11	10	6	58
8	Opel Euroteam	16	13	10	12	Ret	10	10	14	Ret	19	15	C	C	Ret	DNS	Ret	DNS	9	4	15
9	Team Abt Sportsline 1	9	15	DNS			Ret	DNS	12	14	11	14	C	C	5	11	9	7	Ret	DNS	15
9	Team Abt Sportsline 1	10	Ret	Ret			Ret	DNS	Ret	DNS	18	18	C	C	10	Ret	19	14	Ret	Ret	15
9	Team Abt Sportsline 1	23			15	Ret															15
10	Opel-Team Irmscher	12	14	11	14	Ret	16	Ret	9	13	17	9	C	C	Ret	Ret	17	10	Ret	DNS	5
11	Team Abt Sportsline 2	20	16	Ret	16	13†	Ret	14	11	15	Ret	Ret	C	C	11	Ret	16	15	14	Ret	4
11	Team Abt Sportsline 2	21			17	DNS					12	16	C	C	9	Ret	15	Ret	13	9	4
Pos	Driver	Car No.	HOC1		OSC1		NOR		SAC		NÜR1		LAU		OSC2		NÜR2		HOC2		Pts

== Bibliography ==
- Voigt, Thomas (2000). Tourenwagen Story 2000: Die Rennen, die Fahrer, die Technik (in German). Berlin: Sportverlag Berlin. ISBN 978-3-328-00878-1.
