= 1999 Super Tourenwagen Cup =

6th edition of German car racing series

Seasons
- ← 1998 none →

The 1999 ADAC Deutsche Super Touren Wagen-Meisterschaft was the sixth and final edition of the Super Tourenwagen Cup (STW).

It was broadcast by Vox, Eurosport, and RTL.

== Season summary ==
BMW, Nissan and Peugeot dropped their factory support for the last season of the STW. It saw a season-long battle between works Opel driver Uwe Alzen and semi-independent Audi driver Christian Abt. After winning the first four races of the season Abt took the championship lead which he would keep for the whole season, while Alzen battled to close the points gap. After his initial four-race streak Abt would only win one additional race while Alzen claimed six, and at the final race the gap was only a few points. Abt looked to have secured the title running in a strong position in the last race, but on the last lap he was taken out by Opel driver Roland Asch, who had already been black flagged for a previous incident. This allowed Alzen to claim the championship in a highly controversial fashion. The title would however be handed to Abt some months later by a DMSB court of appeal.

== Teams and drivers ==
Team	Car	No.	Driver	Rounds
(Germany) Warsteiner Team Holzer	Opel Vectra	4	(Germany) Uwe Alzen	All
(Germany) TNT Team Holzer	Opel Vectra	3	(France) Éric Hélary	All
(Italy) J.A.S.-Team Honda Sport	Honda Accord	5	(Italy) Gabriele Tarquini	All
(Italy) J.A.S.-Team Honda Sport	Honda Accord	6	(Denmark) Tom Kristensen	All
(Germany) Warsteiner Team Holzer	Opel Vectra	7	(Germany) Manuel Reuter	All
(Germany) Abt Sportsline	Audi A4 Quattro	8	(Sweden) Mattias Ekström	8
(Germany) Abt Sportsline	Audi A4 Quattro	9	(Denmark) Kris Nissen	All
(Germany) Abt Sportsline	Audi A4 Quattro	10	(Germany) Christian Abt	All
(Italy) Euroteam	Alfa Romeo 156	11	(Italy) Stefano Modena	All
(Italy) Euroteam	Alfa Romeo 156	12	(Germany) Andreas Scheld	1–3
(Italy) Euroteam	Alfa Romeo 156	13	(Italy) Gianluca Paglicci	6–10
(Germany) Jever Audi-Team AZK Phoenix	Audi A4 Quattro	14	(Germany) Michael Bartels	All
(Germany) Jever Audi-Team AZK Phoenix	Audi A4 Quattro	15	(Germany) Arnd Meier	All
(Germany) Raceline Marketing	Opel Vectra	16	(Germany) Heinrich Symanzick	2–10
(Germany) Pleuger Motorsport	Opel Vectra	17	(Germany) Olaf Pleuger	2–10
(Germany) ER Motorsport	Alfa Romeo 155	18	(Germany) Franz Engstler	4–10
(Germany) Irmscher Sport	Opel Vectra	20	(Germany) Roland Asch	All
(Germany) KW Rennteam	Honda Accord	21	(Germany) Thomas Stingl	All
(Germany) Oliver Mayer Motorsport	Audi A4 Quattro	22	(Germany) Oliver Mayer	All
(Germany) Oliver Mayer Motorsport	Audi A4 Quattro	23	(Czech Republic) Christian Zink	4-10
(Germany) ER Motorsport	Alfa Romeo 155	23	(Czech Republic) Christian Zink	2
(Germany) ER Motorsport	Alfa Romeo 155	24	(Austria) Wolfgang Treml	3–5, 7, 9–10
National Team Slovakia	Audi A4 Quattro	25	(Slovakia) Andrej Studenič	All
(Czech Republic) NH Car Sports Team	Opel Vectra	26	(Czech Republic) Václav Nimč	All
(Italy) Alfa Corse	Alfa Romeo 156	27	(Italy) Nicola Larini	5
(Italy) Alfa Corse	Alfa Romeo 156	28	(Italy) Fabrizio Giovanardi	5
(Italy) PSGR	Audi A4 Quattro	29	(Italy) Guido Lucchetti Cigarini	5
(Germany) Hildenbrandt Motorsport	Opel Vectra	31	(Germany) Patrick Hildenbrandt	7–10
(Italy) Euroteam	Alfa Romeo 156	32	(Italy) Davide Campana	5
(Germany) Grohs Motorsport	BMW 320i	34	(Germany) Georg Severich	8–10
(Germany) Grohs Motorsport	BMW 320i	35	(Germany) Oliver Brinkmann	8

== Race calendar and winners ==
Round	Race	Circuit	Date	Pole position	Winning driver	Winning team
1	(Germany) Int. ADAC-Sparkassenpreises für Automobile	Sachsenring	9 May	(Germany) Christian Abt	(Germany) Christian Abt	(Germany) Abt Sportsline
1	(Germany) Int. ADAC-Sparkassenpreises für Automobile	Sachsenring	9 May		(Germany) Christian Abt	(Germany) Abt Sportsline
2	(Germany) ADAC-Preis Flugplatzrennen	Zweibrücken	23 May	(Germany) Uwe Alzen	(Germany) Christian Abt	(Germany) Abt Sportsline
2	(Germany) ADAC-Preis Flugplatzrennen	Zweibrücken	23 May		(Germany) Christian Abt	(Germany) Abt Sportsline
3	(Germany) Int. ADAC-Preis der Tourenwagen von Sachsen-Anhalt	Oschersleben	20 June	(Germany) Uwe Alzen	(Germany) Uwe Alzen	(Germany) Warsteiner Team Holzer
3	(Germany) Int. ADAC-Preis der Tourenwagen von Sachsen-Anhalt	Oschersleben	20 June		(Germany) Uwe Alzen	(Germany) Warsteiner Team Holzer
4	(Germany) 57. Int. ADAC Norisring-Speedweekend 1999	Norisring	4 July	(France) Éric Hélary	(Germany) Uwe Alzen	(Germany) Warsteiner Team Holzer
4	(Germany) 57. Int. ADAC Norisring-Speedweekend 1999	Norisring	4 July		(Germany) Manuel Reuter	(Germany) Warsteiner Team Holzer
5	(Italy) Int. ADAC Gold-Cup Misano	Misano	8 August	(Italy) Fabrizio Giovanardi	(Italy) Fabrizio Giovanardi	(Italy) Alfa Corse
5	(Italy) Int. ADAC Gold-Cup Misano	Misano	8 August		(Germany) Christian Abt	(Germany) Abt Sportsline
6	(Germany) ADAC Großer Preis der Tourenwagen	Nürburgring	22 August	(Germany) Manuel Reuter	(Germany) Manuel Reuter	(Germany) Warsteiner Team Holzer
6	(Germany) ADAC Großer Preis der Tourenwagen	Nürburgring	22 August		(Denmark) Tom Kristensen	(Italy) J.A.S.-Team Honda Sport
7	(Austria) Int. ADAC Alpentrophäe	Salzburgring	5 September	(Germany) Uwe Alzen	(Germany) Uwe Alzen	(Germany) Warsteiner Team Holzer
7	(Austria) Int. ADAC Alpentrophäe	Salzburgring	5 September		(Germany) Uwe Alzen	(Germany) Warsteiner Team Holzer
8	(Germany) Int. ADAC-Preis von Niedersachsen	Oschersleben	19 September	(France) Éric Hélary	(Italy) Gabriele Tarquini	(Italy) J.A.S.-Team Honda Sport
8	(Germany) Int. ADAC-Preis von Niedersachsen	Oschersleben	19 September		(France) Éric Hélary	(Germany) TNT Team Holzer
9	(Germany) Int. ADAC-Preis Hockenheim	Hockenheimring	3 October	(Denmark) Tom Kristensen	(Denmark) Kris Nissen	(Germany) Abt Sportsline
9	(Germany) Int. ADAC-Preis Hockenheim	Hockenheimring	3 October		(Denmark) Tom Kristensen	(Italy) J.A.S.-Team Honda Sport
10	(Germany) 26. ADAC Bilstein Supersprint	Nürburgring	17 October	(Germany) Uwe Alzen	(Germany) Uwe Alzen	(Germany) Warsteiner Team Holzer
10	(Germany) 26. ADAC Bilstein Supersprint	Nürburgring	17 October		(Denmark) Tom Kristensen	(Italy) J.A.S.-Team Honda Sport

== Championship results ==
Points system
Race 1	1st	2nd	3rd	4th	5th	6th	7th	8th	9th	10th	11th	12th	13th	14th	15th	16th	17th	18th	19th	20th
	30	24	20	17	16	15	14	13	12	11	10	9	8	7	6	5	4	3	2	1
Race 2	1st	2nd	3rd	4th	5th	6th	7th	8th	9th	10th	11th	12th	13th	14th	15th	16th	17th	18th	19th	20th
	60	48	40	34	32	30	28	26	24	22	20	18	16	14	12	10	8	6	4	2

- Race 20 Nürburgring: Final standing based on lap 32 after Deutschen Motorsport-Bundes (DMSB) decision

=== Drivers Championship ===
Pos	Driver	SAC (Germany)		ZWE (Germany)		OSC (Germany)		NOR (Germany)		MIS (Italy)		NÜR (Germany)		SAL (Austria)		OSC (Germany)		HOC (Germany)		NÜR (Germany)		Pts
1	(Germany) Christian Abt	1	1	1	1	4	3	4	2	5	1	3	2	6	Ret	5	3	18	DSQ	2	3	584
2	(Germany) Uwe Alzen	3	3	2	5	1	1	1	3	2	2	Ret	Ret	1	1	18	5	20	9	1	2	576
3	(Denmark) Tom Kristensen	Ret	6	Ret	4	2	2	19	Ret	Ret	4	16	1	4	2	3	Ret	2	1	3	1	486
4	(Italy) Gabriele Tarquini	8	7	7	3	3	5	16	DNS	4	3	2	3	Ret	6	1	2	6	6	11	4	470
5	(Denmark) Kris Nissen	2	2	5	2	7	6	5	4	Ret	8	Ret	5	Ret	3	7	Ret	1	3	8	12	445
6	(Germany) Manuel Reuter	4	5	3	7	5	4	2	1	12	11	1	Ret	3	5	4	15	3	4	4	Ret	442
7	(Germany) Michael Bartels	5	4	6	Ret	6	13	6	5	7	6	9	6	8	7	11	7	4	2	7	5	419
8	(France) Éric Hélary	6	Ret	4	6	8	7	3	6	14	5	Ret	Ret	2	9	2	1	Ret	10	6	Ret	361
9	(Germany) Arnd Meier	13	10	8	8	9	8	7	8	8	7	5	7	9	Ret	Ret	Ret	8	5	9	6	331
10	(Germany) Roland Asch	9	8	10	9	11	10	8	9	9	9	Ret	Ret	5	8	6	6	5	16	5	DSQ	307
11	(Germany) Oliver Mayer	11	9	12	11	14	14	9	7	11	12	10	8	14	14	10	14	10	7	13	9	306
12	(Slovakia) Andrej Studenič	12	Ret	11	Ret	12	9	10	10	10	10	6	9	16	12	16	8	9	8	15	10	277
13	(Italy) Stefano Modena	7	11	9	10	10	Ret	12	13	6	Ret	4	4	7	4	Ret	DNS	7	Ret	10	7	271
14	(Czech Republic) Václav Nimč	14	Ret	15	12	18	Ret	17	Ret	20	15	13	14	13	13	19	12	12	14	Ret	17	148
15	(Germany) Thomas Stingl	10	DNS	14	14	17	11	11	11	16	17	8	Ret	10	11	Ret	DNS	Ret	DNS	17	20	147
16	(Italy) Gianluca Paglicci											7	12	11	10	9	Ret	11	11	12	8	141
17	(Czech Republic) Christian Zink			16	13			15	Ret	18	16	14	13	18	15	13	11	Ret	DNS	16	11	129
18	(Germany) Heinrich Symanzick			Ret	DNS	Ret	Ret	18	DNS	17	DSQ	15	15	17	17	17	9	14	15	14	13	115
19	(Germany) Olaf Pleuger			Ret	DNS	15	Ret	13	Ret	Ret	14	11	10	12	Ret	14	Ret	17	12	22	14	112
20	(Germany) Franz Engstler							14	12	13	13	12	11	Ret	Ret	12	Ret	19	DNS	19	15	103
21	(Germany) Georg Severich															15	10	15	13	21	16	60
22	(Austria) Wolfgang Treml					16	12	Ret	DNS	19	DNS			19	18			13	DNS	20	18	48
23	(Sweden) Mattias Ekström															8	4					47
24	(Germany) Patrick Hildenbrandt													15	16	Ret	13	16	Ret	18	19	44
25	(Italy) Fabrizio Giovanardi									1	Ret											30
26	(Italy) Nicola Larini									3	Ret											20
27	(Germany) Andreas Scheld	Ret	Ret	13	Ret	13	Ret															16
28	(Italy) Guido Luchetti Cigarini									15	Ret											6
29	(Germany) Oliver Brinkmann															20	Ret					1
30	(Italy) Davide Campana									Ret	DNS											0
Pos	Driver	SAC (Germany)		ZWE (Germany)		OSC (Germany)		NOR (Germany)		MIS (Italy)		NÜR (Germany)		SAL (Austria)		OSC (Germany)		HOC (Germany)		NÜR (Germany)		Pts

Colour	Result
Gold	Winner
Silver	Second place
Bronze	Third place
Green	Points classification
Blue	Non-points classification
Blue	Non-classified finish (NC)
Purple	Retired, not classified (Ret)
Red	Did not qualify (DNQ)
Red	Did not pre-qualify (DNPQ)
Black	Disqualified (DSQ)
White	Did not start (DNS)
White	Withdrew (WD)
White	Race cancelled (C)
Blank	Did not practice (DNP)
Blank	Did not arrive (DNA)
Blank	Excluded (EX)

=== Manufacturers' Trophy ===
Pos	Manufacturer	Points
1	(Germany) Audi	1993
2	(Germany) Opel	1835
3	(Japan) Honda	1105
4	(Italy) Alfa Romeo	632
5	(Germany) BMW	61
