= Manuel Reuter =

German racing driver (born 1961)

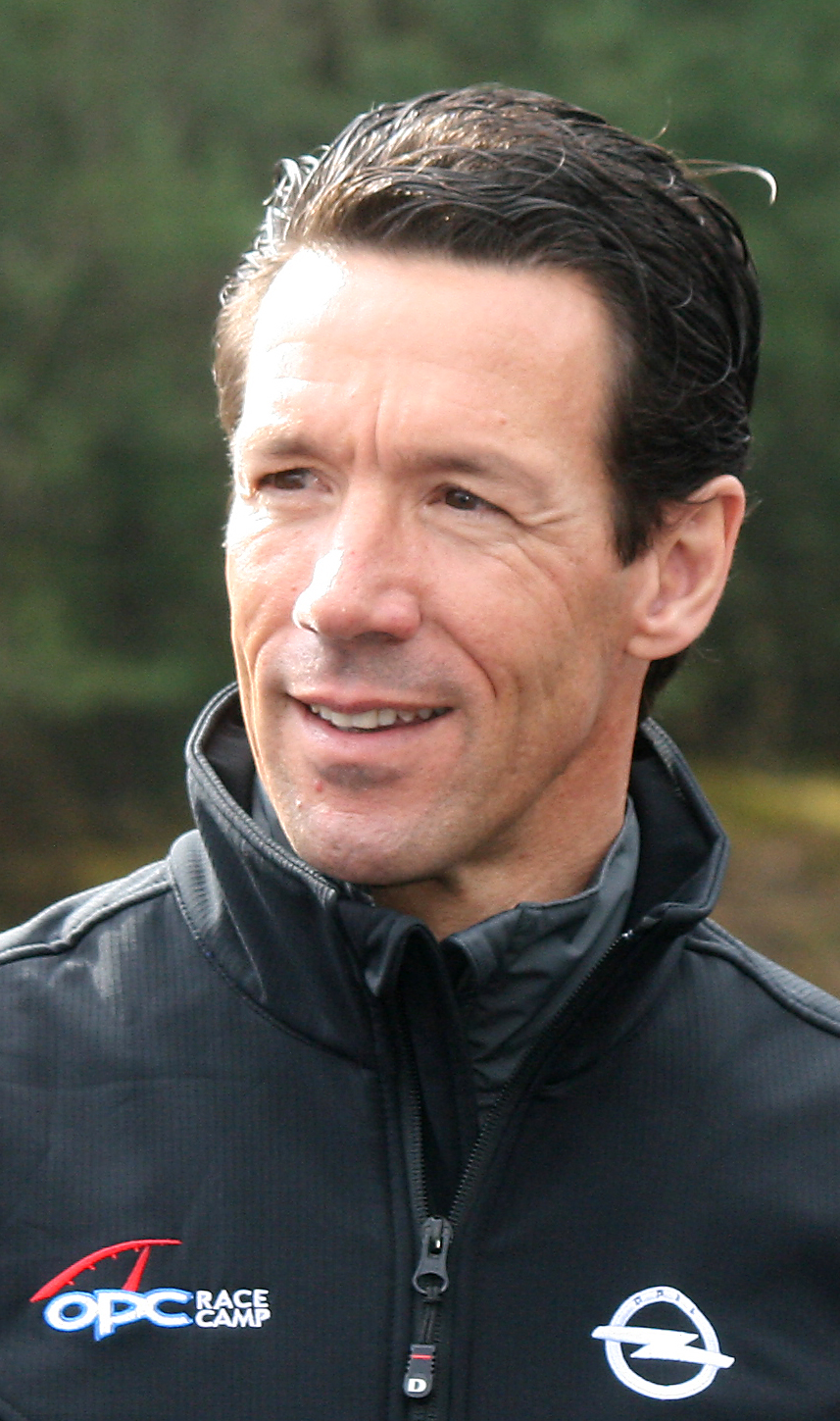
- Reuter in 2010
- Nationality: (Germany) German
- Born: Manuel Carlos Nicki Reuter; 6 December 1961 (age 64) Mainz, West Germany

Deutsche Tourenwagen Masters
- Years active: 2000–2005
- Former teams: OPC Team Holzer; OPC Team Phoenix
- Starts: 86
- Wins: 4
- Podiums: 11
- Poles: 5
- Fastest laps: 3
- Best finish: 2nd in 2000

Super Tourenwagen Cup
- Years active: 1997–1999
- Former teams: Opel Team SMS; Warsteiner Team Holzer
- Starts: 56
- Wins: 5
- Podiums: 13
- Poles: 4
- Fastest laps: 1
- Best finish: 5th in 1998

International Touring Car Championship
- Years active: 1995–1996
- Former teams: Opel Team Joest
- Starts: 35
- Championships: 1 (1996)
- Wins: 3
- Podiums: 10
- Poles: 1
- Fastest laps: 1

Deutsche Tourenwagen Meisterschaft
- Years active: 1985–1991, 1993–1995
- Former teams: Opel Team Joest; Opel Team Schübel; MS-Jet Racing; Ford Ringshausen Motorsport
- Starts: 100
- Wins: 3
- Podiums: 9
- Poles: 5
- Fastest laps: 3
- Best finish: 2nd in 1987

24 Hours of Le Mans career
- Years: 1988–1993, 1996
- Teams: Joest Racing; Joest Porsche Racing; Porsche Kremer Racing; Richard Lloyd Racing; Team Sauber Mercedes; Brun Motorsport
- Best finish: 1st (1989, 1996)
- Class wins: 2 (1989, 1996)

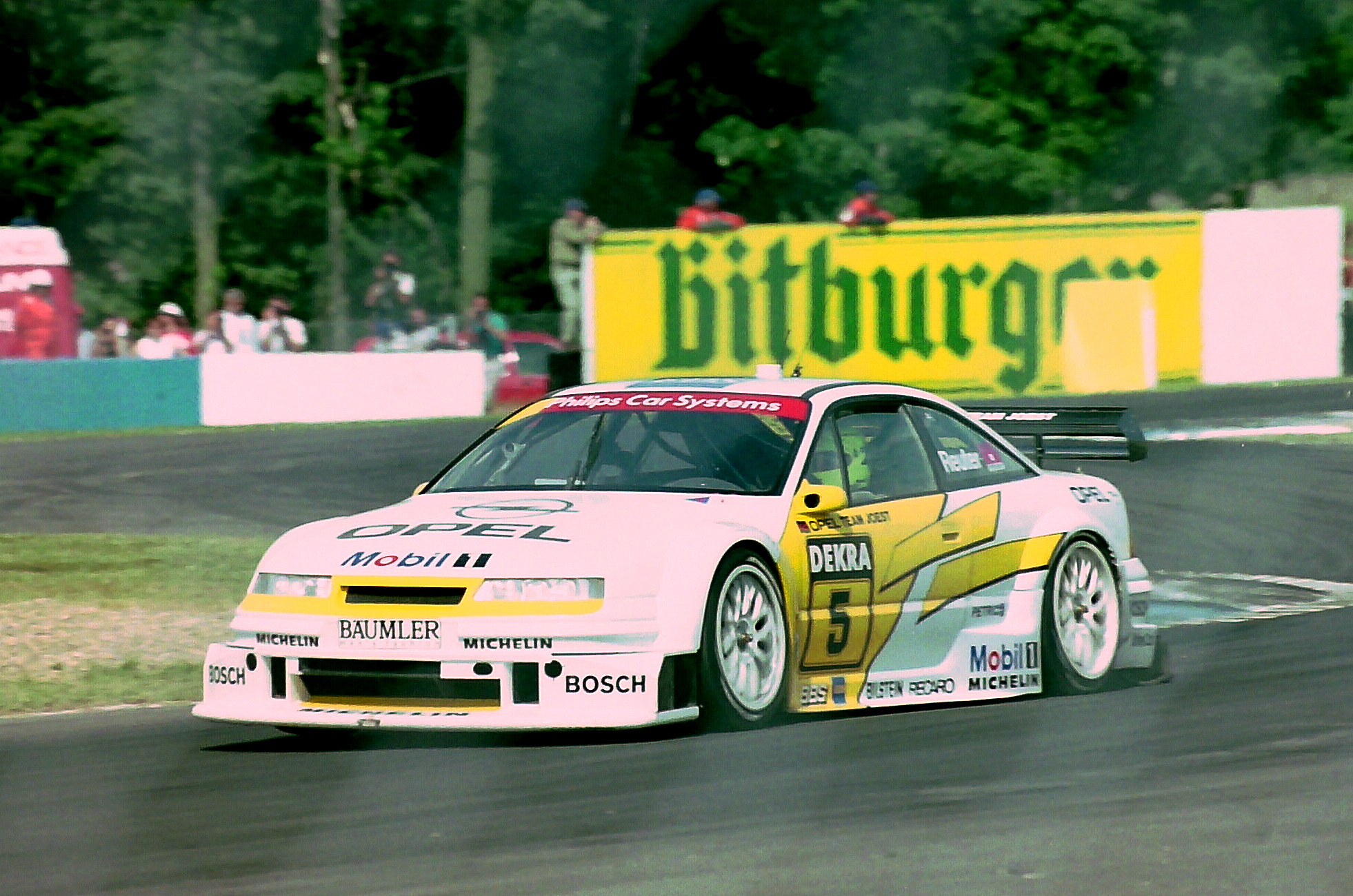
Manuel Reuter - Opel Team Joest - Opel Calibra V6 exits The Esses, Donington Park 1994 DTM

Manuel Carlos Nicki Reuter (born 6 December 1961) is a German former racing driver.

Reuter has won the 24 Hours of Le Mans twice, in 1989 24 Hours of Le Mans for Sauber-Mercedes, and in 1996 24 Hours of Le Mans for Joest Racing.

Reuter also won the Interserie in 1992 in a Kremer K7 and the Deutsche Tourenwagen Meisterschaft/ITC in 1996 for Opel in an Opel Calibra V6.

Reuter continued to race in the Super Tourenwagen Cup for Opel.

When Opel retired from the Deutsche Tourenwagen Masters after 2005, Reuter also retired. He acted as a commentator for the DTM on German television channel Das Erste from 2007 to 2013.

== Racing record ==
=== Complete German Formula Three results ===
(key) (Races in bold indicate pole position) (Races in italics indicate fastest lap)

Year	Entrant	Engine	Class	1	2	3	4	5	6	7	8	9	10	11	12	13	14	DC	Pts
1985	BS Racing	Volkswagen	A	ZOL; DNS	NÜR; 3	HOC; 3	WUN; 2	AVU; 2	ÖST; 9	ERD; 2	NOR; 6	HOC; 4	DIE; 2	ZOL; DNQ	SAL; Ret	SIE; 16	NÜR; 4	4th	112
1986	Josef Kaufmann Racing	Volkswagen	A	ZOL; Ret	WUN; 2	HOC; 3	NOR; 6	ERD; DNS	ÖST	NÜR	ZOL	NÜR	SAL	NÜR				10th	33

=== 24 Hours of Le Mans results ===
Year	Team	Co-Drivers	Car	Class	Laps	Pos.	Class Pos.
1988	(Switzerland) Camel Brun Motorsport	(Austria) Walter Lechner (Switzerland) Franz Hunkeler	Porsche 962C	C1	91	DNF	DNF
1989	(Germany) Team Sauber Mercedes	(Germany) Jochen Mass (Sweden) Stanley Dickens	Sauber C9-Mercedes	C1	389	**1st**	**1st**
1990	(United Kingdom) Richard Lloyd Racing (Italy) Italya Sport	(Finland) JJ Lehto (United Kingdom) James Weaver	Porsche 962C GTi	C1	181	DNF	DNF
1991	(Germany) Porsche Kremer Racing	(Finland) Harri Toivonen (Finland) JJ Lehto	Porsche 962CK6	C2	343	9th	9th
1992	(Germany) Porsche Kremer Racing	(Italy) Giovanni Lavaggi (Denmark) John Nielsen	Porsche 962CK6	C3	334	7th	**2nd**
1993	(Germany) Joest Porsche Racing	(Germany) Frank Jelinski (Germany) "John Winter"	Porsche 962C	C2	282	DNF	DNF
1996	(Germany) Joest Racing	(United States) Davy Jones (Austria) Alexander Wurz	TWR Porsche WSC-95	LMP1	354	**1st**	**1st**

=== Bathurst 1000 results ===
Year	Team	Co-Drivers	Car	Class	Laps	Pos.	Class Pos.	Ref
1992	(Australia) Mobil 1 Racing	(Australia) Peter Brock	Holden Commodore (VP)	C	118	27th	**3rd**	

=== Complete Deutsche Tourenwagen Meisterschaft/Masters results ===
(key) (Races in bold indicate pole position) (Races in italics indicate fastest lap)

Year	Team	Car	1	2	3	4	5	6	7	8	9	10	11	12	13	14	15	16	17	18	19	20	21	22	23	24	Pos.	Pts
1985		Ford Sierra XR4 TI	ZOL	WUN	AVU	MFA; Ret	ERD	ERD	DIE	DIE	ZOL; Ret	SIE; 26	NÜR; 3														22nd	16
1986	Ford Ringshausen	Ford Sierra XR4 TI	ZOL; Ret	HOC; 12	**NÜR**; Ret	AVU; Ret	MFA; 7	WUN; 4	NÜR	ZOL; 4	NÜR; 1																9th	69
1987	Ford Ringshausen Motorsport	Ford Sierra XR4 TI	**HOC**; Ret	ZOL; 7	**NÜR**; 1	**AVU**; 2	**MFA**; 1	NOR; 17	NÜR; 6	WUN; 4																	2nd	124
1987	Ford Ringshausen Motorsport	Ford Sierra RS 500 Cosworth									DIE; 3	SAL; 12															2nd	124
1988	Ford Ringshausen Motorsport	Ford Sierra RS 500 Cosworth	ZOL; 1	ZOL; 2	HOC; 1	HOC; 2	NÜR; 1; 14	NÜR; 2 Ret	BRN; 1 Ret	BRN; 2; 19	AVU; 1 Ret	AVU; 2; 15	MFA; 1; 13	MFA; 2 Ret	NÜR; 1; 14	NÜR; 2; 10	NOR; 1 Ret	NOR; 2; 9	WUN; 1; 6	WUN; 2; 5	SAL; 1 C	SAL; 2 C	HUN; 1	HUN; 2	HOC; 1; 25	HOC; 2 DNS	20th	66
1989	MS-Jet Racing	Mercedes 190E 2.3-16	ZOL; 1; 8	ZOL; 2; 5	HOC; 1; 24	HOC; 2; 13	NÜR; 1; 7	NÜR; 2; 4	MFA; 1; 12	MFA; 2; 6																	6th	214
1989	MS-Jet Racing	Mercedes 190E 2.5-16 Evo									AVU; 1; 4	AVU; 2; 3	NÜR; 1; 4	NÜR; 2; 7	NOR; 1; 9	NOR; 2; 9	HOC; 1; 13	HOC; 2 Ret	DIE; 1; 8	DIE; 2; 5	NÜR; 1 Ret	NÜR; 2 Ret	HOC; 1; 6	HOC; 2; 5			6th	214
1991	Opel Team Schübel	Opel Omega 3000 Evo 500	ZOL; 1	ZOL; 2	HOC; 1	HOC; 2	NÜR; 1	NÜR; 2	AVU; 1	AVU; 2	WUN; 1	WUN; 2	NOR; 1	NOR; 2	DIE; 1	DIE; 2	NÜR; 1; 20	NÜR; 2; 17	ALE; 1	ALE; 2	HOC; 1	HOC; 2	BRN; 1	BRN; 2	DON; 1	DON; 2	NC	0
1993	Joest Racing	Opel Calibra V6 4x4	ZOL; 1	ZOL; 2	HOC; 1	HOC; 2	NÜR; 1	NÜR; 2	WUN; 1	WUN; 2	NÜR; 1	NÜR; 2	NOR; 1	NOR; 2	DON; 1	DON; 2	DIE; 1	DIE; 2	ALE; 1	ALE; 2	AVU; 1	AVU; 2	HOC; 1 Ret	HOC; 2 DNS			NC	0
1994	Opel Team Joest	Opel Calibra V6 4x4	ZOL; 1 Ret	ZOL; 2; 7	HOC; 1; 8	HOC; 2; 4	NÜR; 1; 6	NÜR; 2 Ret	MUG; 1 Ret	MUG; 2 Ret	NÜR; 1; 8	NÜR; 2; 5	NOR; 1; 5	NOR; 2 Ret	DON; 1 Ret	DON; 2; 1	DIE; 1 Ret	DIE; 2 Ret	NÜR; 1; 6	NÜR; 2; 4	AVU; 1 Ret	AVU; 2 Ret	ALE; 1; 6	ALE; 2; 3	HOC; 1; 4	HOC; 2; 8	8th	89
1995	Opel Team Joest	Opel Calibra V6 4x4	HOC; 1; 22	HOC; 2 Ret	AVU; 1 Ret	AVU; 2; 13	NOR; 1 Ret	NOR; 2 Ret	DIE; 1; 16	DIE; 2; 7	NÜR; 1 Ret	NÜR; 2; 7	ALE; 1; 5	ALE; 2 Ret	HOC; 1; 2	HOC; 2; 4											12th	39
2000	Opel-Team Phoenix	Opel Astra V8 Coupé	HOC; 1; 3	HOC; 2; 13	**OSC**; **1**; 1	**OSC**; **2**; 1	NOR; 1; 3	NOR; 2; 2	SAC; 1; 13†	SAC; 2; 11	NÜR; 1; 5	NÜR; 2; 5	LAU; 1 C	LAU; 2 C	OSC; 1; 3	OSC; 2; 2	NÜR; 1; 1	**NÜR**; **2**; 1	**HOC**; **1**; 16	HOC; 2 Ret							**2nd**	**162**
2001	Opel-Team Phoenix	Opel Astra V8 Coupé	HOC; QR; 12	HOC; CR; 12	NÜR; QR; Ret	NÜR; CR; DNS	OSC; QR; 13	OSC; CR; 15	SAC; QR; 8	SAC; CR; 14	NOR; QR; 15	NOR; CR; 8	LAU; QR; 13	LAU; CR; 7	NÜR; QR; 12	NÜR; CR; 5	A1R; QR; 13	A1R; CR; 4	ZAN; QR; 9	ZAN; CR; 13	HOC; QR; 11	HOC; CR; 4					9th	35
2002	Opel-Team Phoenix	Opel Astra V8 Coupé 2002	HOC; QR; 18	HOC; CR; 17†	ZOL; QR; 11	ZOL; CR; 15	**DON**; **QR**; 3	DON; CR; 14†	SAC; QR; 18	SAC; CR; Ret	NOR; QR; 8	NOR; CR; 7	LAU; QR; 11	LAU; CR; 5	NÜR; QR; 8	NÜR; CR; 6	A1R; QR; 8	A1R; CR; 7	ZAN; QR; 5	ZAN; CR; 4	HOC; QR; 6	HOC; CR; Ret					10th	7
2003	OPC Team Holzer	Opel Astra V8 Coupé 2003	HOC; 9	ADR; Ret	NÜR; 9	LAU; 12	NOR; 13	DON; Ret	NÜR; 15†	A1R; 10	ZAN; 4	HOC; 19†															10th	5
2004	OPC Team Holzer	Opel Vectra GTS V8 2004	HOC; 10	EST; 16	ADR; 13	LAU; 8	NOR; 8	SHA	NÜR; 12	OSC; 3	ZAN; 8	BRN; 12	HOC; Ret														12th	9
2005	OPC Team Phoenix	Opel Vectra GTS V8 2005	HOC; Ret	LAU; 16	SPA; 16†	BRN; Ret	OSC; 15	NOR; 9	NÜR; 20	ZAN; Ret	LAU; 5	IST; 14	HOC; 12														17th	4
Sources:

- † — Retired, but was classified as he completed 90% of the winner's race distance.

=== Complete International Touring Car Championship results ===
(key) (Races in bold indicate pole position) (Races in italics indicate fastest lap)

Year	Team	Car	1	2	3	4	5	6	7	8	9	10	11	12	13	14	15	16	17	18	19	20	21	22	23	24	25	26	Pos.	Pts
1995	Opel Team Joest	Opel Calibra V6 4x4	MUG; 1; 9	MUG; 2 Ret	HEL; 1; 4	HEL; 2; 7	DON; 1; 10	DON; 2; 6	EST; 1; 16	EST; 2; 9	MAG; 1; 4	MAG; 2; 2																	6th	50
1996	Opel Team Joest	Opel Calibra V6 4x4	HOC; 1; 1	**HOC**; **2**; 3	NÜR; 1; 3	NÜR; 2; 1	EST; 1; 4	EST; 2; 3	HEL; 1; 2	HEL; 2; 2	NOR; 1; 6	NOR; 2; 5	DIE; 1; 10	DIE; 2; 6	SIL; 1; 6	SIL; 2; 6	NÜR; 1; 4	NÜR; 2; 16	MAG; 1 Ret	MAG; 2 DNS	MUG; 1; 18	MUG; 2; 7	HOC; 1; 2	HOC; 2; 1	INT; 1; 4	INT; 2; 4	SUZ; 1; 13	SUZ; 2; 14	**1st**	**218**

=== Complete Super Tourenwagen Cup results ===
(key) (Races in bold indicate pole position) (Races in italics indicate fastest lap)

Year	Team	Car	1	2	3	4	5	6	7	8	9	10	11	12	13	14	15	16	17	18	19	20	Pos.	Pts
1997	Opel Team SMS	Opel Vectra	HOC; 1; 15	HOC; 2; 12	ZOL; 1; 12	ZOL; 2; 8	NÜR; 1; 16	NÜR; 2 DNS	SAC; 1; 14	SAC; 2 Ret	NOR; 1 Ret	NOR; 2 DNS	WUN; 1; 9	WUN; 2; 6	ZWE; 1; 9	ZWE; 2; 10	SAL; 1; 11	SAL; 2; 9	REG; 1 Ret	REG; 2 DNS	NÜR; 1; 15	NÜR; 2 Ret	17th	189
1998	Opel Team SMS	Opel Vectra	HOC; 1; 2	HOC; 2; 1	NÜR; 1; 5	NÜR; 2; 11	SAC; 1; 16	SAC; 2; 6	NOR; 1 Ret	NOR; 2; 10	REG; 1; 20	REG; 2; 6	**WUN**; **1**; 2	WUN; 2; 1	**ZWE**; **1**; 5	ZWE; 2; 20	SAL; 1; 3	SAL; 2; 15	OSC; 1; 8	OSC; 2 Ret	**NÜR**; **1**; 1	**NÜR**; **2**; 3	5th	423
1999	Warsteiner Team Holzer	Opel Vectra	SAC; 1; 4	SAC; 2; 5	ZWE; 1; 3	ZWE; 2; 7	OSC; 1; 5	OSC; 2; 4	NOR; 1; 2	NOR; 2; 1	MIS; 1; 12	MIS; 2; 11	NÜR; 1; 1	NÜR; 2 Ret	SAL; 1; 3	SAL; 2; 5	OSC; 1; 4	OSC; 2; 15	HOC; 1; 3	HOC; 2; 4	NÜR; 1; 4	NÜR; 2 Ret	6th	442

Sporting positions
Preceded by Jan Lammers; Johnny Dumfries; Andy Wallace	Winner of the 24 Hours of Le Mans; 1989 with: Jochen Mass; Stanley Dickens	Succeeded by John Nielsen; Price Cobb; Martin Brundle
Preceded by Yannick Dalmas; J.J. Lehto; Masanori Sekiya	Winner of the 24 Hours of Le Mans; 1996 with: Davy Jones; Alexander Wurz	Succeeded by Michele Alboreto; Stefan Johansson; Tom Kristensen
Preceded by Bernd Schneider	International Touring Car Champion; 1996	Succeeded by None
