= Volker Weidler =

German racing driver (born 1962)

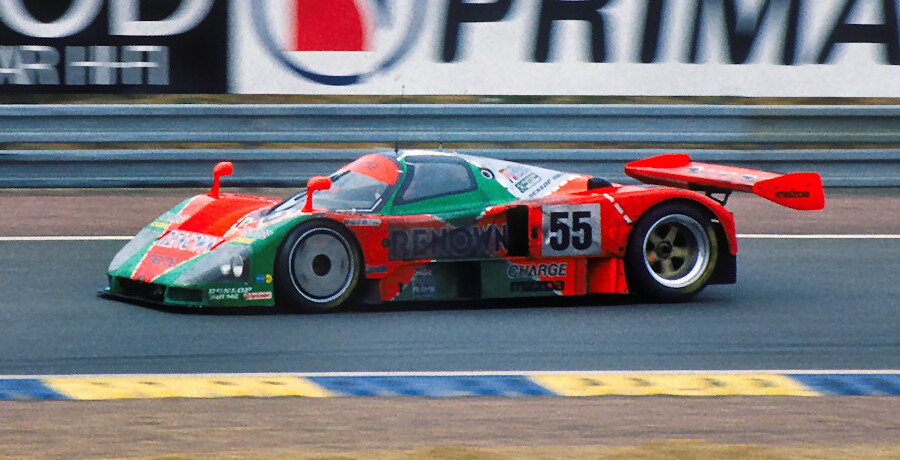
- Weidler's Mazda in 1991
- Born: Volker Hermann Weidler; 18 March 1962 (age 64); Heidelberg, Baden-Württemberg, West Germany

Formula One World Championship career
- Nationality: (West Germany) German
- Active years: 1989
- Team: Rial
- Entries: 10 (0 starts)
- Championships: 0
- Wins: 0
- Podiums: 0
- Career points: 0
- Pole positions: 0
- Fastest laps: 0
- First entry: 1989 Brazilian Grand Prix
- Last entry: 1989 Hungarian Grand Prix

24 Hours of Le Mans career
- Years: 1987, 1989–1992
- Teams: Porsche Kremer Racing, Mazdaspeed (Mazdaspeed/Oreca)
- Best finish: 1st (1991)
- Class wins: 1 (1991)

Volker Hermann Weidler (born 18 March 1962) is a German businessman and retired racing driver, best known for winning the 24 Hours of Le Mans in 1991.

== Career ==
=== Formula racing ===
In 1985, Weidler became German Formula Three champion.

In the 1989 Formula One season, Weidler entered ten Formula One Grands Prix, racing for the Rial team, but failed to qualify the uncompetitive car on every occasion.

After Formula One, Weidler moved to Japan and raced in the Japanese Formula 3000 Championship and the All Japan Sports Prototype Championship. He often fought over the title with Kazuyoshi Hoshino, Ross Cheever and others in the Japanese Formula 3000, and became popular in Japan.

=== GT / Sportscars ===
Weidler won the Porsche Cup, an annual award presented by Porsche AG to recognize the world's most successful privateer racing driver competing with Porsche machinery in a customer racing team, in 1987.

In 1991, Weidler teamed with Johnny Herbert and Bertrand Gachot to win Le Mans behind the wheel of the Wankel engine-powered Mazda 787B, marking also the first win of the legendary French race by both a Japanese manufacturer and engine supplier. This Wankel engine-powered car was noted for being very loud.

Possibly related to the hours spent in the noisy Mazda, Weidler began to suffer from an ear problem (sensorineural hearing loss) which eventually forced him to retire prematurely from the Japanese Formula 3000 Championship during the 1992 season though Weidler was leading the championship at that time.

When Weidler left the Japanese team, Nova Engineering, he recommended Heinz-Harald Frentzen as his successor.

== Post-racing career ==
Weidler now works as a managing director for Weidler, a building cleaning company owned by his family, based in Weinheim.

== Racing record ==
=== Complete International Formula 3000 results ===
(key) (Races in bold indicate pole position; races in italics indicate fastest lap.)

Year	Entrant	Chassis	Engine	1	2	3	4	5	6	7	8	9	10	11	Pos.	Pts
1986	Bromley Motorsport with Rial	Ralt RT20	Cosworth	SIL; 10	VAL; 7	PAU; Ret	SPA; DNQ	IMO	MUG; 16	PER; DNQ	ÖST; 9	BIR	BUG	JAR	NC	0
1988	Onyx Race Engineering	March 88B	Cosworth	JER; DSQ	VAL; 12	PAU; DNQ	SIL; 14	MNZ; 9	PER; Ret	BRH; 6	BIR; 4	BUG; DNS	ZOL; Ret	DIJ; 6	15th	5

=== Complete Formula One results ===
(key)

Year	Entrant	Chassis	Engine	1	2	3	4	5	6	7	8	9	10	11	12	13	14	15	16	WDC	Pts
1989	Rial Racing	Rial ARC2	Ford Cosworth DFR 3.5 V8	BRA; DNPQ	SMR; DNPQ	MON; DNPQ	MEX; DNPQ	USA; DNPQ	CAN; DNPQ	FRA; DNPQ	GBR; DNPQ	GER; EX	HUN; DNQ	BEL	ITA	POR	ESP	JPN	AUS	NC	0

=== Complete Japanese Formula 3000 results ===
(key) (Races in bold indicate pole position) (Races in italics indicate fastest lap)

Year	Team	1	2	3	4	5	6	7	8	9	10	11	DC	Pts
1990	Team Take One	SUZ; Ret	FSW; Ret	MIN; 11	SUZ; 5	SUG; 21	FSW; 3	FSW; Ret	SUZ; 20	**FSW**; 1	SUZ; DSQ		6th	15
1991	Team Nova	SUZ; 15	AUT; DNQ	FSW; 19	MIN; 3	SUZ; 3	SUG; 8	FSW; 3	SUZ; 10	FSW; C	SUZ; 3	FSW; 1	**3rd**	**25**
1992	Team Nova	SUZ; 3	FSW; Ret	MIN; Ret	SUZ; 1	AUT; 3	SUG; 1	FSW	FSW	SUZ	FSW	FSW	4th	26

=== Complete 24 Hours of Le Mans Results ===
Class winners in bold. Cars failing to complete 70% of the winner's distance marked as Not Classified (NC).

Year	Team	Co-Drivers	Car	Class	Laps	Pos.	Class Pos.
1987	(Germany) Porsche Kremer Racing	(Denmark) Kris Nissen (Japan) Kunimitsu Takahashi	Porsche 962C	C1	6	DNF	DNF
1989	(Japan) Mazdaspeed Co. Ltd	(Japan) Yojiro Terada (Belgium) Marc Duez	Mazda 767	GTP	339	12th	**3rd**
1990	(Japan) Mazdaspeed Co. Ltd.	(Belgium) Bertrand Gachot (United Kingdom) Johnny Herbert	Mazda 787	GTP	148	DNF	DNF
1991	(Japan) Mazdaspeed Co. Ltd.	(United Kingdom) Johnny Herbert (Belgium) Bertrand Gachot	Mazda 787B	C2	362	**1st**	**1st**
1992	(Japan) Mazdaspeed Co. Ltd. (France) Oreca	(United Kingdom) Johnny Herbert (Belgium) Bertrand Gachot (Brazil) Maurizio Sandro Sala	Mazda MXR-01	C1	336	4th	4th

Sporting positions
Preceded by Kurt Thiim	German Formula Three champion 1985	Succeeded by Kris Nissen
Preceded by John Nielsen; Price Cobb; Martin Brundle	Winner of the 24 Hours of Le Mans; 1991; With: Johnny Herbert & Bertrand Gachot	Succeeded by Derek Warwick; Yannick Dalmas; Mark Blundell
