= Kris Nissen =

Danish racing driver (born 1960)

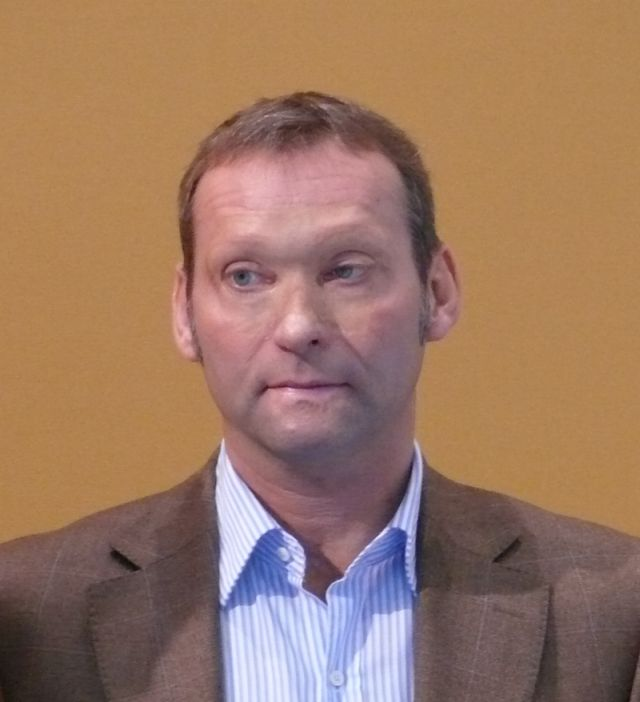
Kris Nissen in 2007.

Nils-Kristian "Kris" Nissen (born 20 July 1960 in Arnum) is a Danish retired auto racing driver. For several years, he was Volkswagen's motorsport director. Since the summer of 2013, he has had a career change and is currently owner and temporary manager of a Danish campingsite called Enderupskov in Southern Jutland.

== Single seater and sports car racing ==
Nissen started racing in karting, and was twice Danish Champion in 1976 and 1977. He was Danish Formula Ford 2000 Champion in 1982 and German Formula Three Champion in 1986. in 1987 and 1988 he drove in Japan with a Porsche 962 in the All Japan Sports Prototype Championship. During his time, there he was involved in an accident at Fuji in 1988 in which he suffered serious burns to his body and face. He was removed from the wrecked car by fellow driver Paolo Barilla and he spent two weeks in a coma.

== Touring car racing ==
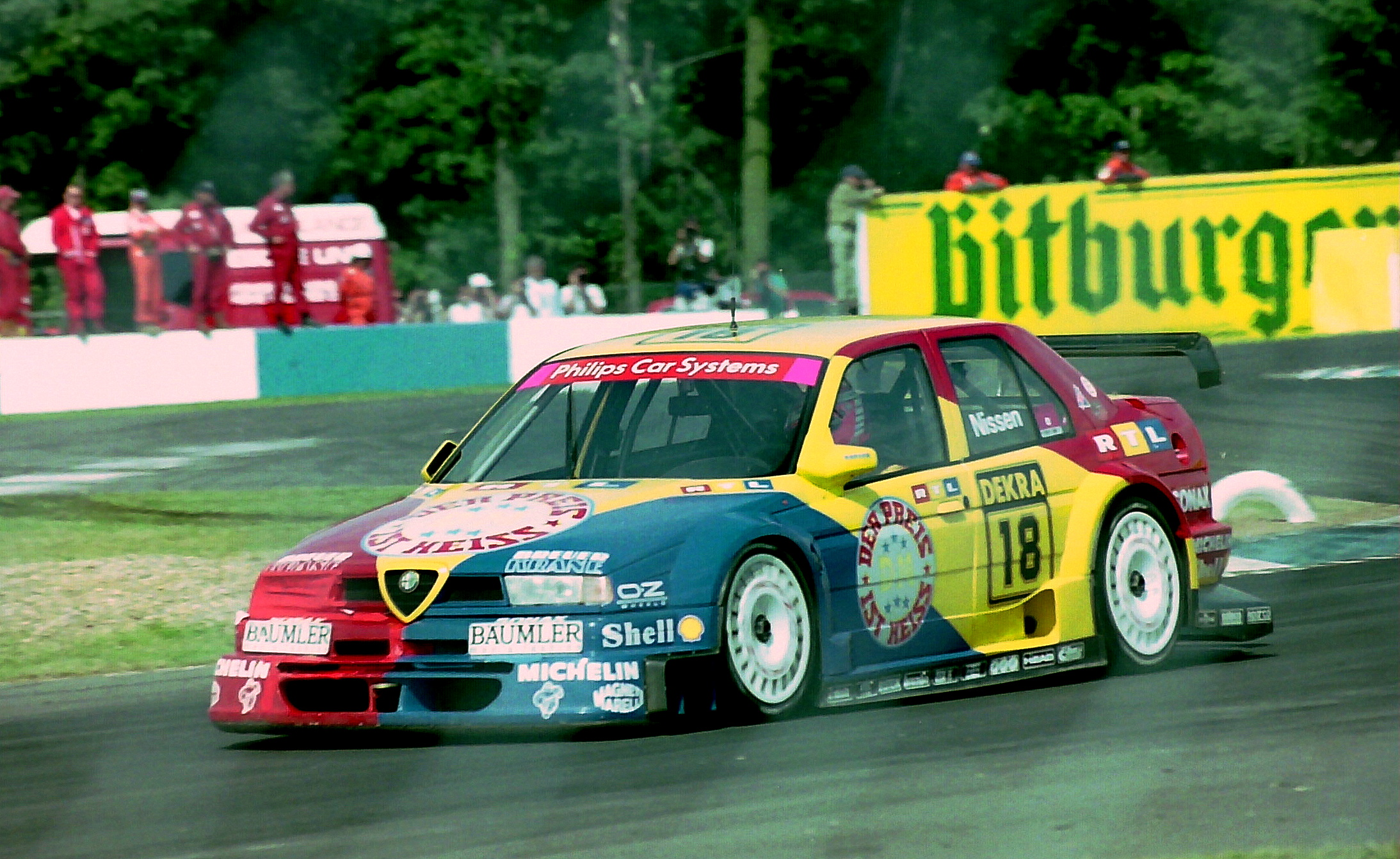
Nissen driving the Schübel Engineering Alfa Romeo 155 V6 Ti at Donington Park during the 1994 Deutsche Tourenwagen Meisterschaft season.

Between 1989 and 1992, Nissen drove in the DTM for various teams in a works supported BMW M3. In 1991, he won the 24 Hours of Nürburgring with the Schnitzer Motorsport BMW. In 1992, he won the Nordic Touring Car Cup and for the second half of the year he replaced the injured Alain Menu in the British Touring Car Championship for BMW. He finished as runner-up in the 1993 ADAC GT Cup, followed by a return to the DTM in 1994 in a privateer Alfa Romeo. In this year, he won his only DTM race.

Nissen continued to race in Germany, when he competed in the German STW Super Touring Cup with a Ford Mondeo in 1995, and Audi A4 in 1996, 1997 and 1999. He spent a brief time in the 1999 inaugural Danish Touring Car Championship in a Volkswagen Beetle. In 2000, he returned once more to the resurrected DTM, with the Abt Sportsline-run Audi TT. For his final two years in racing, he competed in the V8Star Series in 2001 and 2002.

== Racing record ==
=== Complete International Formula 3000 results ===
(key) (Races in bold indicate pole position; races in italics indicate fastest lap.)

Year	Entrant	Chassis	Engine	1	2	3	4	5	6	7	8	9	10	11	Pos.	Pts
1987	Genoa Racing	March 87B	Cosworth	SIL	VAL	SPA	PAU	DON	PER	BRH	BIR	IMO	BUG	JAR; DNQ	NC	0

=== Complete 24 Hours of Le Mans results ===
Year	Team	Co-Drivers	Car	Class	Laps	Pos.	Class Pos.
1987	(Germany) Porsche Kremer Racing	(Germany) Volker Weidler (Japan) Kunimitsu Takahashi	Porsche 962C	C1	6	DNF	DNF
1988	(Germany) Leyton House Kremer Racing	(Germany) Harald Grohs (South Africa) George Fouché	Porsche 962C	C1	371	8th	8th

=== Complete Deutsche Tourenwagen Meisterschaft/Masters results ===
(key) (Races in bold indicate pole position) (Races in italics indicate fastest lap)

Year	Team	Car	1	2	3	4	5	6	7	8	9	10	11	12	13	14	15	16	17	18	19	20	21	22	23	24	Pos.	Pts
1986	Scuderia Kassel	Mercedes 190E 2.3-16	ZOL	HOC	NÜR	AVU	MFA; 9	WUN	NÜR	ZOL	NÜR																31st	10
1989	BMW M Team Zakspeed	BMW M3 Evo	ZOL; 1	ZOL; 2	HOC; 1	HOC; 2	NÜR; 1	NÜR; 2	MFA; 1	MFA; 2	AVU; 1	AVU; 2	NÜR; 1	NÜR; 2	NOR; 1; 20	NOR; 2 DNS	HOC; 1; 17	HOC; 2 Ret	DIE; 1; 13	DIE; 2; 12	NÜR; 1; 12	NÜR; 2 Ret	HOC; 1; 15	HOC; 2 Ret			29th	26
1990	BMW M Team Linder	BMW M3 Sport Evo	ZOL; 1; 11	ZOL; 2; 11	HOC; 1; 14	HOC; 2; 10	NÜR; 1; 9	NÜR; 2; 10	AVU; 1; 22	AVU; 2 Ret	MFA; 1; 22	MFA; 2; 13	WUN; 1; 9	WUN; 2; 19	NÜR; 1; 11	NÜR; 2; 9	NOR; 1; 19	NOR; 2; 16	DIE; 1	DIE; 2	NÜR; 1	NÜR; 2	HOC; 1	HOC; 2			23rd	8
1991	M Team Team Schnitzer	BMW M3 Sport Evo	ZOL; 1; 3	ZOL; 2 Ret	HOC; 1; 28	HOC; 2; 13	NÜR; 1; 8	NÜR; 2; 4	AVU; 1; 32	AVU; 2; 10	WUN; 1; 19	WUN; 2 Ret	NOR; 1; 2	NOR; 2 DNS	DIE; 1; 10	DIE; 2; 13	NÜR; 1; 13	NÜR; 2 Ret	ALE; 1; 8	ALE; 2; 10	HOC; 1 DNS	HOC; 2 DNS	BRN; 1; 15	BRN; 2; 8	DON; 1; 9	DON; 2; 5	12th	46
1992	Unitron Racing	BMW M3 Sport Evolution	ZOL; 1; 14	ZOL; 2; 6	NÜR; 1; 13	NÜR; 2; 17	WUN; 1; 9	WUN; 2; 7	AVU; 1; 13	AVU; 2 Ret	HOC; 1; 14	HOC; 2; 10	NÜR; 1 Ret	NÜR; 2 DNS	NOR; 1; 12	NOR; 2; 13	BRN; 1; 9	BRN; 2; 11	DIE; 1	DIE; 2	ALE; 1; 7	ALE; 2; 13	NÜR; 1	NÜR; 2	HOC; 1; 10	HOC; 2; 7	17th	24
1994	Schübel Engineering	Alfa Romeo 155 V6 Ti	ZOL; 1; 7	ZOL; 2 Ret	HOC; 1; 9	HOC; 2; 6	NÜR; 1; 5	NÜR; 2; 4	MUG; 1 Ret	MUG; 2; 3	NÜR; 1; 5	NÜR; 2; 3	NOR; 1; 6	NOR; 2; 1	DON; 1; 5	DON; 2 Ret	DIE; 1; 11	DIE; 2; 7	NÜR; 1; 10	NÜR; 2; 7	AVU; 1; 11	AVU; 2; 9	ALE; 1; 3	ALE; 2 DSQ	HOC; 1; 11	HOC; 2 Ret	7th	99
2000	Abt Sportsline	Abt Audi TT-R	HOC; 1; 16	HOC; 2 Ret	OSC; 1; 16	OSC; 2; 13†	NOR; 1 Ret	NOR; 2; 14	SAC; 1; 11	SAC; 2; 15	NÜR; 1 Ret	NÜR; 2 Ret	LAU; 1 C	LAU; 2 C	OSC; 1; 11	OSC; 2 Ret	NÜR; 1; 16	NÜR; 2; 15	HOC; 1; 14	HOC; 2 Ret							20th	0
2001	Abt Sportsline	Abt Audi TT-R	HOC; QR	HOC; CR	NÜR; QR	NÜR; CR	OSC; QR	OSC; CR	SAC; QR; 19	SAC; CR; Ret	NOR; QR	NOR; CR	LAU; QR	LAU; CR	NÜR; QR	NÜR; CR	A1R; QR	A1R; CR	ZAN; QR	ZAN; CR	HOC; QR	HOC; CR					25th	0

- † — Retired, but was classified as he completed 90% of the winner's race distance.

=== Complete British Touring Car Championship results ===
(key) (Races in bold indicate pole position) (Races in italics indicate fastest lap)

Year	Team	Car	1	2	3	4	5	6	7	8	9	10	11	12	13	14	15	DC	Pts
1992	M Team Mobil	BMW 318is	SIL; 1	THR; 1	OUL; 1	SNE; 1	BRH; 1	DON; 1	DON; 2	SIL; 1	KNO; 1	KNO; 2	PEM; 1; 4	BRH; 1; 7	BRH; 2; 7	DON; 1 Ret	SIL; 1; 7	11th	18

=== Complete Super Tourenwagen Cup results ===
(key) (Races in bold indicate pole position) (Races in italics indicate fastest lap)

Year	Team	Car	1	2	3	4	5	6	7	8	9	10	11	12	13	14	15	16	17	18	19	20	Pos.	Pts
1995	Ford Mondeo Team Wolf	Ford Mondeo	ZOL; 1 Ret	ZOL; 2 DNS	SPA; 1	SPA; 2	ÖST; 1	ÖST; 2	HOC; 1	HOC; 2	NÜR; 1	NÜR; 2											24th	63
1995	Ford Mondeo Team Schübel	Ford Mondeo											SAL; 1; 16	SAL; 2; 16	AVU; 1; 17	AVU; 2; 12	NÜR; 1; 12	NÜR; 2; 8					24th	63
1996	Abt Sportsline	Audi A4 Quattro	ZOL; 1; 6	ZOL; 2; 3	ASS; 1; 8	ASS; 2; 8	HOC; 1; 7	HOC; 2 Ret	SAC; 1; 23	SAC; 2 DNS	WUN; 1; 10	WUN; 2 Ret	ZWE; 1; 11	ZWE; 2; 5	SAL; 1; 14	SAL; 2; 12	AVU; 1 Ret	AVU; 2; 17	NÜR; 1; 7	NÜR; 2 Ret			13th	214
1997	Abt Sportsline	Audi A4 Quattro	HOC; 1; 5	HOC; 2; 6	ZOL; 1; 16	ZOL; 2; 6	NÜR; 1; 14	NÜR; 2; 13	SAC; 1; 8	SAC; 2; 19	NOR; 1; 16	NOR; 2; 4	WUN; 1; 24	WUN; 2; 14	ZWE; 1; 14	ZWE; 2; 14	SAL; 1; 15	SAL; 2; 10	REG; 1; 11	REG; 2; 8	NÜR; 1; 26	NÜR; 2; 16	9th	273
1999	Abt Sportsline	Audi A4 Quattro	SAC; 1; 2	SAC; 2; 2	ZWE; 1; 5	ZWE; 2; 2	OSC; 1; 7	OSC; 2; 6	NOR; 1; 5	NOR; 2; 4	MIS; 1 Ret	MIS; 2; 8	NÜR; 1 Ret	NÜR; 2; 5	SAL; 1 Ret	SAL; 2; 3	OSC; 1; 7	OSC; 2 Ret	HOC; 1; 1	HOC; 2; 3	NÜR; 1; 8	NÜR; 2; 12	5th	445

Sporting positions
Preceded by Volker Weidler	German Formula Three champion 1986	Succeeded by Bernd Schneider
