= Franz Tost =

Formula One team principal (born 1956)

- Born: 20 January 1956 (age 70); Trins, Austria
- Occupation: Former team principal in Formula One (2006–2023)

Franz Tost (born 20 January 1956) is an Austrian former racing driver and the former team principal of the Scuderia AlphaTauri Formula One team, a role he departed from at the end of the 2023 Formula One season.

== Early life ==
Tost competed as a driver in Formula Ford and Formula Three, winning the Austrian Formula Ford Championship in 1983. However, he felt that he was not skilled enough to get to the top of motorsport, so he decided to study Sport Science and Management at the University of Innsbruck and the University of Vienna. This landed him a job as team manager at the Walter Lechner Racing School. In 1993, he joined forces with Willi Weber, which initially led him to run the WTS Formula Three team. There, he met a young Ralf Schumacher and was asked by Willi Weber to accompany him to Japan.

== Formula One career ==
In 2000, Ralf Schumacher joined the Williams Formula 1 team. Tost followed him, working for Williams' engine supplier BMW as Track Operations Manager until 1 January 2006.

In 2005, Tost was appointed as the team principal of Scuderia Toro Rosso which was the new name of former team Minardi after Red Bull acquired the team. Tost stated that he would aim for fifth place in the Constructors' Championship. He achieved his best results with the team in 2008, 2019 and 2021 landing in the sixth spot in each of these seasons.

Tost retained the role of team principal when Toro Rosso were re-christened as AlphaTauri at the beginning of the 2020 season. Tost was one of the longest serving Formula One team principals of all time.

Tost is often described as hard-working and professional. He is straightforward and not shy of sharing his opinion.

On 26 April 2023, it was announced that Tost would be departing from his role as Team Principal at the end of the 2023 season. Tost had spent 18 years in the role.

== Criticism ==
Following the 2007 European Grand Prix, at the Nürburgring in Germany, it was alleged that Tost assaulted driver Scott Speed over an incident on the track. After Tost later denied the incident, Speed went to the press describing the acrimonious situation at the team, stating that "after coming out and denying this stuff, it's just another very dishonest thing that Franz or Gerhard [Berger] have said in the media to damage me and Tonio (Vitantonio Liuzzi)". Speed also stated that he did not want to race for Tost and Berger again.
