= Anson Cars =

Anson Cars was a British racing car constructor.

In 1975, Formula One mechanics Gary Anderson (who worked for Brabham) and Bob Simpson (who worked for Tyrrell), built a Formula 3 car called the Anson SA1. It was based on the Brabham BT38 and was raced by Anderson in Formula Libre. Anderson left Brabham at the end of 1976 to focus on designing the Anson SA2 Formula 3 car for 1977. Last minute withdrawal of sponsorship left the project in great difficulties and part-way through 1977 the car was withdrawn.

Anderson rejoined Formula One as chief mechanic at McLaren. He remained there for two years after which he joined the Ensign team. In 1980, Anderson, Simpson and ex-Rolls-Royce employee Jeff Hills formed Anson Cars, which built Formula 3 and Formula Super Vee cars for the next six years.

In 1985, Anderson went to America to become the chief engineer of the Galles Indycar team.

In 1988, Mike McHugh purchased the company, with the goal of building Super Vee cars in California. Two months later, the two top executives in Volkswagen America who were instrumental in VW's support of the Super Vee series were killed in the Lockerbie air disaster and the market for the cars disappeared.

Anson's greatest achievements as a constructor were Franz Konrad winning the 1983 German F3 Championship and Tommy Byrne finishing 6th in the 1984 European F3 Championship.

== See also ==
- Lola Cars
- Reynard Motorsport
- Van Diemen
- Crosslé Car Company
- Swift Engineering
