= List of German Formula Three champions =

This article contains a list of German Formula Three champions. The championship has been in existence intermittently since 1950 and has some former champions who later made Formula One. The most notable among these are seven-times world champion Michael Schumacher, 2004 Monaco Grand Prix winner Jarno Trulli and multiple podium finisher Nick Heidfeld. Nine-time 24 Hours of Le Mans winner Tom Kristensen and 2005 DTM champion Gary Paffett also won the series early in their respective careers.

== By season ==
Season	Champion	Team	Chassis	Engine	Secondary Class Champion
2014	(Germany) Markus Pommer	Lotus	Dallara F308	Volkswagen	R: (Netherlands) Indy Dontje
2013	(Germany) Marvin Kirchhöfer	Lotus	Dallara F311	Volkswagen	T: (Germany) Sebastian Balthasar; R: (Germany) Marvin Kirchhöfer; DMSB: (Germany) Marvin Kirchhöfer
2012	(Sweden) Jimmy Eriksson	Lotus	Dallara F311	Volkswagen	T: (Germany) André Rudersdorf; R: (Austria) Lucas Auer
2011	(New Zealand) Richie Stanaway	Van Amersfoort Racing	Dallara F307	Volkswagen	T: (Russia) Maxim Travin; R: (New Zealand) Richie Stanaway
2010	(France) Tom Dillmann	HS Technik	Dallara F307	Volkswagen	T: (Germany) Riccardo Brutschin; R: (Denmark) Kevin Magnussen
2009	(Belgium) Laurens Vanthoor	van Amersfoort Racing	Dallara F307	Volkswagen	T: (Ukraine) Sergey Chukanov; R: (Netherlands) Stef Dusseldorp; S: (Belgium) Laurens Vanthoor
2008	(Belgium) Frédéric Vervisch	Swiss Racing Team	Dallara F307	OPC Challenge	T: (Austria) Marco Oberhauser; R: (Colombia) Sebastián Saavedra; S: (Belgium) Frédéric Vervisch
2007	(Netherlands) Carlo van Dam	van Amersfoort Racing	Dallara F306	OPC Challenge	T: (Germany) Michael Klein; R: (Netherlands) Carlo van Dam
2006	(Netherlands) Ho-Pin Tung	JB Motorsport	Lola B06-30	Opel	T: (Latvia) Harald Schlegelmilch; R: (Latvia) Harald Schlegelmilch
2005	(Germany) Peter Elkmann	Jo Zeller Racing	Dallara F304	Opel-Spiess	T: (Germany) Kevin Fank; R: (Germany) Pascal Kochem
2004	(Germany) Bastian Kolmsee	HS Technik	Dallara F302	Opel-Spiess	R: (Germany) Bastian Kolmsee
2003	(Brazil) João Paulo de Oliveira	JB Motorsport	Dallara F302	Opel-Spiess	R: (Germany) Sven Barth
2002	(United Kingdom) Gary Paffett	Team Rosberg	Dallara F302	Opel	R: (Germany) Timo Glock
2001	(Japan) Toshihiro Kaneishi	Opel Team BSR	Dallara F301	Opel	R: (Germany) Markus Winkelhock
2000	(Italy) Giorgio Pantano	Opel Team KMS	Dallara F300	Opel	R: (Germany) André Lotterer
1999	(Netherlands) Christijan Albers	Opel Team BSR	Dallara 399	Opel	R: (Netherlands) Walter van Lent
1998	(Belgium) Bas Leinders	van Amersfoort Racing	Dallara 398	Opel	R: (Austria) Robert Lechner
1997	(Germany) Nick Heidfeld	Team Opel BSR	Dallara 397	Opel	C: (Czech Republic) Jaroslav Kostelecký; R: (Germany) Timo Scheider
1996	(Italy) Jarno Trulli	Opel Team KMS Benetton	Dallara 396	Opel	B: (Sweden) Johan Stureson
1995	(Argentina) Norberto Fontana	KMS Motorsport	Dallara 395	Opel	B: (Denmark) Jakob Sund
1994	(Germany) Jörg Müller	RSM Marko	Dallara 394	Fiat	B: (Germany) Arnd Meier
1993	(Netherlands) Jos Verstappen	WTS Racing	Dallara 393	Opel	B: (Germany) Patrick Bernhardt
1992	(Portugal) Pedro Lamy	WTS Racing	Reynard 923	Opel	B: (Germany) Christian Abt
1991	(Denmark) Tom Kristensen	Bertrand Schäfer Racing	Ralt RT 35	Volkswagen	B: (Germany) Mathias Arlt
1990	(Germany) Michael Schumacher	WTS Racing	Reynard 903	Volkswagen	B: (Austria) Franz Binder
1989	(Austria) Karl Wendlinger	RSM Marko	Ralt RT 33	Alfa Romeo	B: (West Germany) Franz Engstler
1988	(West Germany) Joachim Winkelhock	WTS Racing	Reynard 883	Volkswagen	B: (Switzerland) Daniel Müller
1987	(West Germany) Bernd Schneider	Schübel Rennsport Int.	Dallara 387	Volkswagen	Not held
1986	(Denmark) Kris Nissen	Bertrand Schäfer Racing	Ralt RT30	Volkswagen	Not held
1985	(West Germany) Volker Weidler	Josef Kaufmann Racing	Martini MK 45	Volkswagen	Not held
1984	(Denmark) Kurt Thiim	Bongers Motorsport	Ralt RT 3	Alfa Romeo	Not held
1983	(Austria) Franz Konrad	Konrad Racing	Anson SA4	Toyota	Not held
1982	(Denmark) John Nielsen	Volkswagen Motorsport	Ralt RT 3	Volkswagen	Not held
1981	(West Germany) Frank Jelinski	Bertrand Schäfer Racing	Ralt RT 3	Toyota	Not held
1980	(West Germany) Frank Jelinski	Bertrand Schäfer Racing	Ralt RT 3	Toyota	Not held
1979	(West Germany) Michael Korten	Korten Motorsport	March 793	Toyota	Not held
1978	(West Germany) Bertram Schäfer	Bertrand Schäfer Racing	Ralt RT 1	BMW, Toyota	Not held
1977	(Austria) Peter Scharmann	Team Obermoser Jörg	ToJ-F302	Toyota	Not held
1976	(West Germany) Bertram Schäfer	Bertrand Schäfer Racing	Ralt RT 1	BMW	Not held
1975	(West Germany) Ernst Maring	Maring Motorsport	Maco 375	Toyota	Not held
1974	(West Germany) Willi Deutsch	Willi Deutsch	March 733	Ford	P: (Italy) Giorgio Francia
1973	(West Germany) Willi Deutsch	Willi Deutsch	March 733	Ford	Not held
1972	(West Germany) Willi Sommer	Reifag Racing Team	March 723	Ford	DDR: (East Germany) Hartmut Thaßler
1971	(West Germany) Manfred Mohr	Manfred Mohr	Lotus 69	Ford	DDR: (East Germany) Wolfgang Küther
1970	No Championship				DDR: (East Germany) Klaus-Peter Krause
1969	No Championship				DDR: (East Germany) Frieder Rädlein
1968	No Championship				DDR: (East Germany) Heinz Melkus
1967	No Championship				DDR: (East Germany) Heinz Melkus
1966	No Championship				DDR: (East Germany) Willy Lehmann
1965	No Championship				DDR: (East Germany) Willy Lehmann
1964	No Championship				DDR: (East Germany) Max Byczkowski
1963	Formula Junior				
1962	Formula Junior				
1961	Formula Junior				
1960	Formula Junior				
1959	No Championship				
1958	No Championship				DDR: (East Germany) Heinz Melkus
1957	No Championship				DDR: (East Germany) Willy Lehmann
1956	No Championship				DDR: (East Germany) Willy Lehmann
1955	No Championship				DDR: (East Germany) Willy Lehmann
1954	No Championship				DDR: (East Germany) Willy Lehmann
1953	(West Germany) Adolf Lang	Adolf Lang	Cooper T15	JAP	DDR: (East Germany) Willy Lehmann
1952	(West Germany) Hellmut Deutz	Hellmut Deutz	Scampolo 501/4, Scampolo 502/10	DKW, Norton	DDR: (East Germany) Willy Lehmann
1951	(West Germany) Walter Komossa	Walter Komossa	Scampolo 502/9	BMW	DDR: (East Germany) Werner Lehmann
1950	(West Germany) Toni Kreuzer	Toni Kreuzer	Cooper T11	JAP	DDR: (East Germany) Richard Weiser

== By driver nationality ==
Pos	Nation	Championships
1	Germany	27
2	Denmark	4
3	Belgium	3
3	Netherlands	4
3	Austria	3
6	Italy	2
8	Argentina	1
8	Brazil	1
8	France	1
8	Japan	1
8	Portugal	1
8	United Kingdom	1
8	New Zealand	1
8	Sweden	1

== By team ==
Pos	Team	Championships	Years
1	Opel Team BSR	9	1976, 1978, 1980, 1981, 1986, 1991, 1997, 1999, 2001
2	WTS Racing	4	1988, 1990, 1992, 1993
2	van Amersfoort Racing	4	1998, 2007, 2009, 2011
4	Opel Team KMS	3	1995, 1996, 2000
4	Lotus	3	2012, 2013, 2014
6	HS Technik	2	2004, 2010
6	JB Motorsports	2	2003, 2006
6	RSM Marko	2	1989, 1994
9	Bongers Motorsport	1	1984
9	Josef Kaufmann Racing	1	1985
9	Jo Zeller Racing	1	2005
9	Konrad Racing	1	1983
9	Korten Motorsport	1	1979
9	Maring Motorsport	1	1975
9	Schübel Rennsport Int.	1	1987
9	Swiss Racing Team	1	2008
9	Team Obermoser Jörg	1	1977
9	Team Rosberg	1	2002
9	Volkswagen Motorsport	1	1982
