= 1976 German Formula Three Championship =

Seasons
- ← 1975 1977 →

The 1976 German Formula Three Championship (German: 1976 ONS Formel 3 Meisterschaft) was a multi-event motor racing championship for single-seat open wheel formula racing cars held in Germany. The championship featured drivers competing in two-litre Formula Three racing cars which conformed to the technical regulations, or formula, for the championship. It commenced on 3 April at Nürburgring and ended at Ulm-Mengen on 13 September after eight rounds.

Bertram Schäfer became a champion. He won all five races that he has participated (Nürburgring, Trier, AVUS, Hockenheim and at Ulm-Mengen. Marc Surer finished as runner-up, winning the race Kassel-Calden. Rudolf Dötsch completed the top-three in the drivers' standings with win at Nürburgring. Werner Klein was the only other driver who was able to win a race in the season.

== Calendar ==
All rounds were held in West Germany.

Round	Location	Circuit	Date	Supporting
1	Nürburg, West Germany	Nürburgring	3 April	XI. ADAC Goodyear 300 km Rennen
2	Trier, West Germany	Trier Air Base	25 April	AvD/ISCC-Flugplatzrennen Sembach - Trier
3	Berlin, West Germany	AVUS	23 May	ADAC-Avus-Rennen
4	Nürburg, West Germany	Nürburgring	29 May	XXII. ADAC 1000 km Rennen
5	Wunstorf, West Germany	Wunstorf Air Base	6 June	ADAC Flugplatz-Rennen Wunstorf
6	Hockenheim, West Germany	Hockenheimring	3 July	6. ADAC "Preis der Stadt Karlsruhe"
7	Kassel-Calden, West Germany	Kassel-Calden Circuit	22 August	ADAC-Hessen-Preis
8	Ulm-Mengen, West Germany	Ulm-Mengen	12 September	11. ADAC-Rundstreckenrennen Ulm-Mengen

== Championship standings ==
- Points are awarded as follows:

1	2	3	4	5	6	7	8	9	10
20	15	12	10	8	6	4	3	2	1

=== 1976 ===
Pos	Driver	NÜR1	TRI	AVU	NÜR2	WUN	HOC	KAS	ULM	Points
1	(West Germany) Bertram Schäfer	1	1	1			1		1	100
2	(Switzerland) Marc Surer	2	2		3			1	2	77
3	(West Germany) Rudolf Dötsch		4	4	1		3		3	64
4	(West Germany) Werner Klein			7	4	1	2			49
5	(West Germany) Jochen Dauer			2	5		4		4	43
6	(West Germany) Dieter Kern		5		2	2				38
7	(West Germany) Heinz Scherle	4			10	4	6		5	35
8	(West Germany) Roland Saier		3			3				24
9	(West Germany) Ernst Maring			3			5			20
10	(West Germany) Walter Spitaler	3		6						18
11	(United Kingdom) William Dawson		6		8	6	8			18
12	(West Germany) Helmut Bross							2		15
13	(West Germany) Peter Wisskirchen					5	7			12
14	(United Kingdom) John Rust	5			9					10
15	(West Germany) Rudolf Rohnert			5						8
16	(West Germany) Detlef Schmickler				6					6
17	(West Germany) Wolfgang Locher		7							4
18	(West Germany) Günter Kölmel				7					4
19	(West Germany) Erwin Derichs					7				4
20	(West Germany) Josef Kremer					8				3
21	(West Germany) Dietmar Floer					9				2
Pos	Driver	NÜR1	TRI	AVU	NÜR2	WUN	HOC	KAS	ULM	Points

Colour	Result
Gold	Winner
Silver	Second place
Bronze	Third place
Green	Points classification
Blue	Non-points classification
Blue	Non-classified finish (NC)
Purple	Retired, not classified (Ret)
Red	Did not qualify (DNQ)
Red	Did not pre-qualify (DNPQ)
Black	Disqualified (DSQ)
White	Did not start (DNS)
White	Withdrew (WD)
White	Race cancelled (C)
Blank	Did not practice (DNP)
Blank	Did not arrive (DNA)
Blank	Excluded (EX)

**Bold** – Pole
Italics – Fastest Lap
