= 1977 German Formula Three Championship =

Seasons
- ← 1976 1978 →

The 1977 German Formula Three Championship (German: 1977 Formel 3 Meisterschaft der ONS) was a multi-event motor racing championship for single-seat open wheel formula racing cars held in Germany and in Belgium. The championship featured drivers competing in two-litre Formula Three racing cars which conformed to the technical regulations, or formula, for the championship. It commenced on 27 March at Nürburgring and ended at the same place on 2 October after eight rounds.

Team Obermoser Jörg driver Peter Scharmann became a champion. He won race at Kassel-Calden. Rudolf Dötsch finished as runner-up, he had three race wins, but he haven't participated in the three races. Heinz Scherle completed the top-three in the drivers' standings with win at Diepholz Airfield Circuit. Bertram Schäfer and Werner Klein were the only other drivers who won a race in the season.

== Calendar ==
All rounds were held in West Germany, excepting Zolder rounds that were held in Belgium.

Round	Location	Circuit	Date	Supporting
1	Nürburg, West Germany	Nürburgring	27 March	XII. ADAC Goodyear 300 km Rennen
2	Nürburg, West Germany	Nürburgring	28 May	XXIII. ADAC 1000 km Rennen
3	Wunstorf, West Germany	Wunstorf Air Base	12 June	ADAC Flugplatz-Rennen Wunstorf
4	Diepholz, West Germany	Diepholz Airfield Circuit	24 July	10. ADAC-Flugplatzrennen Diepholz
5	Heusden-Zolder, Belgium	Circuit Zolder	14 August	11. ADAC-Westfalen-Pokal-Rennen
6	Kassel-Calden, West Germany	Kassel-Calden Circuit	21 August	ADAC-Hessen-Preis
7	Ulm-Mengen, West Germany	Ulm-Mengen	18 September	12. ADAC-Rundstreckenrennen Ulm-Mengen
8	Nürburg, West Germany	Nürburgring	2 October	IV. ADAC-Bilstein-Super-Sprint

== Championship standings ==
- Points are awarded as follows:

1	2	3	4	5	6	7	8	9	10
20	15	12	10	8	6	4	3	2	1

Pos	Driver	NÜR1	NÜR2	WUN	DIE	ZOL	KAS	ULM	NÜR3	Points
1	(Austria) Peter Scharmann	3	2	2	3	2	1	4		99
2	(West Germany) Rudolf Dötsch		1			6	5	1	1	74
3	(West Germany) Heinz Scherle	2	5	7	1	7		5	3	71
4	(West Germany) Michael Korten		8	5	2	4	3	3		60
5	(West Germany) Bertram Schäfer	1				1	2			55
6	(West Germany) Jochen Dauer	4	3			5		2	6	51
7	(West Germany) Werner Klein		6	1		3	4			48
8	(West Germany) Thomas von Löwis	7		6	5			7	2	37
9	(United Kingdom) Alan Smith			8	4	10	6	8		23
10	(West Germany) Werner Fischer	5			6			6		20
11	(West Germany) Wolfgang Klein		7	3		9				18
12	(West Germany) Rudi Niggemeier		9	4		8				15
13	(West Germany) Wolfgang Locher	9	4							12
14	(West Germany) Peter Bonk				7				5	12
15	(West Germany) Peter Kroeber								4	10
16	(West Germany) Walter Spitaler	6	10	9						9
17	(West Germany) Helmut Bross	8								3
18	(West Germany) Bernd Heuer				8					3
19	(West Germany) Manfred Cassani				9					2
20	(West Germany) Peter Wisskirchen	10								1
Pos	Driver	NÜR1	NÜR2	WUN	DIE	ZOL	KAS	ULM	NÜR3	Points

Colour	Result
Gold	Winner
Silver	Second place
Bronze	Third place
Green	Points classification
Blue	Non-points classification
Blue	Non-classified finish (NC)
Purple	Retired, not classified (Ret)
Red	Did not qualify (DNQ)
Red	Did not pre-qualify (DNPQ)
Black	Disqualified (DSQ)
White	Did not start (DNS)
White	Withdrew (WD)
White	Race cancelled (C)
Blank	Did not practice (DNP)
Blank	Did not arrive (DNA)
Blank	Excluded (EX)

**Bold** – Pole
Italics – Fastest Lap
