= 1978 German Formula Three Championship =

Seasons
- ← 1977 1979 →

The 1978 German Formula Three Championship (German: 1978 Deutsche Formel-3-Meisterschaft) was a multi-event motor racing championship for single-seat open wheel formula racing cars held in Germany and in Belgium. The championship featured drivers competing in two-litre Formula Three racing cars which conformed to the technical regulations, or formula, for the championship. It commenced on 12 March at Circuit Zolder and ended at Erding on 1 October after nine rounds.

Klaus Zimmermann Racing Team driver Bertram Schäfer became a champion. He won races at Zolder, Nürburgring and Wunstorf. Alan Smith finished as runner-up, he was consistent but wasn't able to win a race. The same was true for Helmut Bross, who completed the top-three in the drivers' standings. Jochen Dauer, Michael Korten and Walter Lechner were the only other drivers who were able to win a race in the season.

== Calendar ==
All rounds were held in West Germany, excepting Zolder rounds that were held in Belgium.

Round	Location	Circuit	Date	Supporting
1	Heusden-Zolder, Belgium	Circuit Zolder	12 March	IX. AvD/MVBL "Bergischer Löwe"
2	Nürburg, West Germany	Nürburgring	2 April	XIII. ADAC Goodyear 300 km Rennen
3	Nürburg, West Germany	Nürburgring	28 May	XXIV. ADAC 1000 km Rennen
4	Wunstorf, West Germany	Wunstorf Air Base	11 June	ADAC Flugplatz-Rennen Wunstorf
5	Diepholz, West Germany	Diepholz Airfield Circuit	23 July	11. ADAC-Flugplatzrennen Diepholz
6	Heusden-Zolder, Belgium	Circuit Zolder	20 August	12. ADAC-Westfalen-Pokal-Rennen
7	Ulm-Mengen, West Germany	Ulm-Mengen	27 August	13. ADAC-Rundstreckenrennen Ulm-Mengen
8	Kassel-Calden, West Germany	Kassel-Calden Circuit	3 September	ADAC-Hessen-Preis
9	Erding, West Germany	Erding Air Base	1 October	ADAC Flugplatz-Rennen Erding

== Championship standings ==
- Points are awarded as follows:

1	2	3	4	5	6	7	8	9	10
20	15	12	10	8	6	4	3	2	1

Pos	Driver	ZOL1	NÜR1	NÜR2	WUN	DIE	ZOL2	ULM	KAS	ERD	Points
1	(West Germany) Bertram Schäfer	1	1	3	1	2	1	4			117
2	(United Kingdom) Alan Smith	4	3	2	5		6	6	2	2	87
3	(West Germany) Helmut Bross	2	2		2	5	5	9	4	3	85
4	(West Germany) Jochen Dauer	9			3	1		5	1	1	82
5	(West Germany) Hans Georg Burger			4		3	2	2	7		56
6	(West Germany) Michael Korten				4			1	3		42
7	(Austria) Walter Lechner			1	8		8	3			38
8	(West Germany) Rudi Niggemeier		4		9	6	4		6		34
9	(West Germany) Thomas von Löwis		5	5	6	4					32
10	(West Germany) Frank Jelinski						7	7	5	4	26
11	(West Germany) Wolfgang Locher	6			7		3				22
12	(West Germany) Heinz Scherle	3									12
13	(West Germany) Heinrich Wiese			6		8					9
14	(West Germany) Axel Plankenhorn	5									8
15	(West Germany) Herbert Burgmayr									5	8
16	(West Germany) Andy Wietzke	10				9	9				5
17	(West Germany) Walter Spitaler	7									4
18	(West Germany) Olaf Höhn					7					4
19	(Austria) Franz Konrad						10	8			4
20	(West Germany) Peter Kroeber	8									3
21	(West Germany) Peter Hoffmann				10						1
22	(West Germany) Konrad Heberer					10					1
Pos	Driver	ZOL1	NÜR1	NÜR2	WUN	DIE	ZOL2	ULM	KAS	ERD	Points

Colour	Result
Gold	Winner
Silver	Second place
Bronze	Third place
Green	Points classification
Blue	Non-points classification
Blue	Non-classified finish (NC)
Purple	Retired, not classified (Ret)
Red	Did not qualify (DNQ)
Red	Did not pre-qualify (DNPQ)
Black	Disqualified (DSQ)
White	Did not start (DNS)
White	Withdrew (WD)
White	Race cancelled (C)
Blank	Did not practice (DNP)
Blank	Did not arrive (DNA)
Blank	Excluded (EX)

**Bold** – Pole
Italics – Fastest Lap
