= 1982 German Formula Three Championship =

Motor racing season

Seasons
- ← 1981 1983 →

The 1982 German Formula Three Championship (German: 1982 Deutsche Formel-3-Meisterschaft) was a multi-event motor racing championship for single-seat open wheel formula racing cars in Germany, Belgium and Austria. The championship featured drivers competing in two-litre Formula Three racing cars which conformed to the technical regulations, or formula, for the championship. It commenced on 28 March at Nürburgring and ended at Kassel-Calden on 3 October after ten rounds.

Volkswagen Motorsport driver John Nielsen became first Danish champion of the German Formula Three Championship. He dominated the championship, finishing ahead of all of his championship rivals in all seven races he was able to finish. His main title rival Bruno Eichmann had only won race at Salzburgring which wasn't attended by Nielsen. Gerhard Berger completed the top-three in the drivers standings. Franz Konrad was the only other driver who won race in the season.

== Teams and drivers ==
Entry List
| Team | No. | Driver | Chassis | Engine | Rounds |
|---|---|---|---|---|---|
| (West Germany) Bertram Schäfer Racing | 1 | (Switzerland) Bruno Eichmann | Ralt RT3/299 | Toyota | All |
| (West Germany) Bertram Schäfer Racing | 2 | (Denmark) Kris Nissen | Ralt RT3/214 | Toyota | 6–7 |
| (Italy) Euroracing | 1 | (Argentina) Oscar Larrauri | Euroracing 101/2 | Alfa Romeo | 1, 10 |
| (Italy) Euroracing | 2 | (Italy) Emanuele Pirro | Euroracing 101/1 | Alfa Romeo | 1, 10 |
| (West Germany) SAR | 2 | (Switzerland) Dieter Heinzelmann | Ralt RT3 | Toyota | 3 |
| (Austria) Produktiv Fachmessen Prenner von Prikranyi | 3 | (Austria) Theodor Erhard | March | Toyota | 3 |
| (Austria) Konrad Racing | 3 | (Austria) Franz Konrad | March 803B/1 | Toyota | 5–10 |
| (Belgium) Equipe Serge Saulnier | 3 | (Belgium) Didier Theys | Martini MK37 | Alfa Romeo | 1, 10 |
| (West Germany) Druck Chemie — Partner der Druckindustrie | 4 | (West Germany) Helmut Bross | Ralt RT3/214 | Toyota | 1–2, 4, 8–10 |
| (West Germany) Druck Chemie — Partner der Druckindustrie | 4 | (West Germany) Harald Brutschin | Ralt RT3/214 | Toyota | 5 |
| (West Germany) Druck Chemie — Partner der Druckindustrie | 5 | (West Germany) Henning Hagenbauer | Ralt RT3 | Toyota | 2 |
| (Denmark) Jac Nellemann | 4 | (Denmark) Henri Ronnberg | March 813 | Toyota | 4–7 |
| (Belgium) Maurice Roger | 5 | (Belgium) Maurice Roger | Chevron B47/47–79–02 | Toyota | 8–9 |
| (Belgium) Maurice Roger | 26 | (Belgium) Herve Roger | Chevron B47/47–79–02 | Toyota | 10 |
| (United Kingdom) Anson Racing Cars | 5 | (Italy) Claudio Langes | Anson SA3C/004 | Toyota | 1 |
| (France) Total | 6 | (France) Alain Ferté | Martini MK37 | Alfa Romeo | 1 |
| (France) Total | 7 | (France) Philippe Alliot | Martini MK37 | Alfa Romeo | 1 |
| EMCO Motorsport Austria | 6 | (Austria) Walter Lechner | Ralt RT3 | Toyota | 3 |
| (Switzerland) Scuderia Calanda | 6 | (Switzerland) Jakob Bordoli | Martini MK31/003 | Toyota | 1, 10 |
| (West Germany) Nicky Nufer | 7 | (West Germany) Nicky Nufer | Ralt RT3/202 | Toyota | All |
| (West Germany) Josef Kaufmann Racing | 7 | (Netherlands) Arie Luyendijk | Martini MK31 | Toyota | 8–9 |
| (West Germany) Josef Kaufmann Racing | 8 | (West Germany) Josef Kaufmann | Martini MK34/016 | Toyota | 1–7, 9–10 |
| (West Germany) Josef Kaufmann Racing | 9 | (Austria) Gerhard Berger | Martini MK37 | Alfa Romeo | All |
| (United Kingdom) Neil Trundle Racing | 7 | (Argentina) Enrique Benamo | Ralt RT3 | Toyota | 10 |
| (Switzerland) Formel Rennsport Club | 8 | (Switzerland) Jo Zeller | Ralt RT3/234 | Toyota | 1, 10 |
| (Switzerland) Formel Rennsport Club | 11 | (Switzerland) Bruno Huber | Argo JM1/006-F3 | Toyota | 5, 10 |
| (Switzerland) Formel Rennsport Club | 35 | (Switzerland) Jürg-Pascal Vogt | Martini MK37 | Toyota | 5 |
| (Switzerland) Formel Rennsport Club | 36 | (Switzerland) Hanspeter Kaufmann | March 803 | Toyota | 2 |
| (Switzerland) Bruno Corradi | 9 | (Switzerland) Bruno Corradi | Ralt RT3 | Alfa Romeo | 10 |
| (West Germany) Uwe Teuscher | 10 | (West Germany) Uwe Teuscher | March 793 | Toyota | 4–9 |
| (Sweden) Ake Jansson | 11 | (Sweden) Ake Jansson | Ralt RT3 | Toyota | 9 |
| (United Kingdom) Royal Corps of Transport Racing with Mendel | 12 | (United Kingdom) Bob Birrell | March 813/6 | Toyota | 7 |
| (West Germany) Erwin Derichs | 12 | (West Germany) Jürgen Endres | Derichs D380/01 | Toyota | 9 |
| (West Germany) EMSC Bitburg | 14 | (West Germany) Manfred Hebben | Ralt RT3 | Toyota | 1–3, 6, 8–10 |
| (West Germany) Peter Katsarski | 15 | (West Germany) Peter Katsarski | Ralt RT3 | Toyota | 1–8 |
| (West Germany) Rudi Seher | 16 | (West Germany) Rudi Seher | March 793 | Toyota | 2, 4–6, 10 |
| (Sweden) Leo Andersson | 16 | (Sweden) Leo Andersson | Ralt RT3/197 | Toyota | 7 |
| (United Kingdom) Duscholux Racing Team | 17 | (United Kingdom) Donald Bradway | March 813 | Alfa Romeo | 1–9 |
| (West Germany) Penthouse Racing Team | 18 | (West Germany) Thomas von Löwis | March 813 | Alfa Romeo | All |
| (West Germany) Peter Wisskirchen | 19 | (West Germany) Peter Wisskirchen | Ralt RT3 | Toyota | All |
| (West Germany) Sinziger Mineralbrunnen | 20 | (West Germany) Bernd Suckow | Chevron B47 | Toyota | 1–2, 6, 8–9 |
| (West Germany) Sinziger Mineralbrunnen | 25 | (West Germany) Heinrich Heintz | Ralt RT1/23 | Toyota | 1, 6, 8–10 |
| (West Germany) Jan Thoelke | 21 | (West Germany) Jan Thoelke | Argo JM10 | Toyota | 1, 3, 5–10 |
| (West Germany) Scuderia Colonia | 23 | (West Germany) Willi Hüsgen | Maco 376/M013 | Toyota | 6, 9 |
| (Italy) Ignazio Rizza | 26 | (Italy) Ignazio Rizza | March 743/3 | BMW | 2, 9 |
| (Switzerland) Pierre-Alain Lombardi | 27 | (Switzerland) Pierre-Alain Lombardi | Ralt RT3/174 | Toyota | 1 |
| (West Germany) Ursula Ortmann — Ortmann F3 Team | 27 | (Austria) Karl Hasenbichler | March 813/8 | Toyota | 1, 3–5 |
| (Italy) Vesuvio Racing | 27 | (Italy) Roberto Ravaglia | Dallara F382 | Alfa Romeo | 1, 10 |
| (Italy) Vesuvio Racing | 44 | (Italy) Paolo Giangrossi | Ralt RT3/283 | Alfa Romeo | 1 |
| (West Germany) Hubert Grün | 28 | (West Germany) Hubert Grün | March | BMW | 5, 9 |
| (Switzerland) Ecurie La Meute | 29 | (Switzerland) Louis Maulini | March 803/12 | Toyota | 1 |
| (Italy) Trivellato Racing Team | 29 | (Italy) Giulio Regosa | Dallara F382 | Alfa Romeo | 10 |
| (Italy) Trivellato Racing Team | 40 | (Italy) Claudio Langes | Dallara F382 | Alfa Romeo | 10 |
| (West Germany) Volkswagen Motorsport | 30 | (Denmark) John Nielsen | Ralt RT3/281 | Volkswagen | 1–2, 4–10 |
| (West Germany) Team Maredo Steak&Salat | 31 | (West Germany) Hans-Peter Pandur | Ralt RT3 | Toyota | All |
| (West Germany) Sachs Sporting | 33 | (West Germany) Michael Kahnt Sachs Sporting | Ralt RT3 | Toyota | 2 |
| (West Germany) Karl-Heinz Soll | 33 | (West Germany) Karl-Heinz Soll | Ralt RT1 | Toyota | 4 |
| (West Germany) Rudi Seher | 33 | (West Germany) Erich Leitner | Chevron B43 | Toyota | 5 |
| (West Germany) Henning Hagenbauer | 36 | (West Germany) Henning Hagenbauer | Ralt RT3 | Toyota | 1, 3–4 |
| (West Germany) MSV Osann-Monzel | 36 | (West Germany) Arnold Wagner | Ralt RT1 | | 6, 9 |
| (Sweden) Thorbjörn Carlsson | 41 | (Sweden) Thorbjörn Carlsson | Ralt RT3/244 | Toyota | 1 |

== Calendar ==
| Round | Location | Circuit | Date | Supporting |
|---|---|---|---|---|
| 1 | Nürburg, West Germany | Nürburgring | 28 March | XVII. ADAC Goodyear 300 km Rennen |
| 2 | Hockenheim, West Germany | Hockenheimring | 3 April | AvD Deutschland-Trophäe "Jim Clark Rennen" |
| 3 | Salzburg, Austria | Salzburgring | 23 May | 10. ADAC-Bavaria-Rennen |
| 4 | Wunstorf, West Germany | Wunstorf Air Base | 6 June | ADAC-Flugplatzrennen Wunstorf |
| 5 | Erding, West Germany | Erding Air Base | 4 July | 5. ADAC-Flugplatz-Rennen Erding |
| 6 | Nürburg, West Germany | Nürburgring | 18 July | ADAC-H.G.Bürger-Gedächtnisrennen — Preis von Luxembourg |
| 7 | Diepholz, West Germany | Diepholz Airfield Circuit | 1 August | 15. ADAC-Flugplatzrennen Diepholz |
| 8 | Heusden-Zolder, Belgium | Circuit Zolder | 22 August | 16. ADAC Westfalen-Pokal-Rennen" |
| 9 | Nürburg, West Germany | Nürburgring | 26 September | IX. ADAC-Bilstein-Super-Sprint |
| 10 | Kassel, West Germany | Kassel-Calden Circuit | 3 October | ADAC-Hessen-Preis |

== Results ==
| Round | Circuit | Pole position | Fastest lap | Winning driver | Winning team |
|---|---|---|---|---|---|
| 1 | (West Germany) Nürburgring | (Denmark) John Nielsen | (Denmark) John Nielsen | (Argentina) Oscar Larrauri | (Italy) Euroracing |
| 2 | (West Germany) Hockenheimring | (Switzerland) Bruno Eichmann | (Denmark) John Nielsen | (Denmark) John Nielsen | (West Germany) Volkswagen Motorsport |
| 3 | (Austria) Salzburgring | (Switzerland) Bruno Eichmann | (Switzerland) Bruno Eichmann | (Switzerland) Bruno Eichmann | (West Germany) Bertram Schäfer Racing |
| 4 | (West Germany) Wunstorf Air Base | (Switzerland) Bruno Eichmann | (Denmark) John Nielsen | (Denmark) John Nielsen | (West Germany) Volkswagen Motorsport |
| 5 | (West Germany) Erding Air Base | (Denmark) John Nielsen | (Denmark) John Nielsen | (Denmark) John Nielsen | (West Germany) Volkswagen Motorsport |
| 6 | (West Germany) Nürburgring | (Denmark) John Nielsen | (Austria) Franz Konrad | (Austria) Franz Konrad | (Austria) Konrad Racing |
| 7 | (West Germany) Diepholz Airfield Circuit | (Denmark) John Nielsen | (Denmark) John Nielsen | (Denmark) John Nielsen | (West Germany) Volkswagen Motorsport |
| 8 | (Belgium) Circuit Zolder | (Switzerland) Bruno Eichmann | (Denmark) John Nielsen | (Denmark) John Nielsen | (West Germany) Volkswagen Motorsport |
| 9 | (West Germany) Nürburgring | (Denmark) John Nielsen | (Austria) Franz Konrad | (Austria) Franz Konrad | (Austria) Konrad Racing |
| 10 | (West Germany) Kassel-Calden Circuit | (Argentina) Oscar Larrauri | (Argentina) Oscar Larrauri | (Italy) Emanuele Pirro | (Italy) Euroracing |

== Championship standings ==
- Points are awarded as follows:

| 1 | 2 | 3 | 4 | 5 | 6 | 7 | 8 | 9 | 10 |
|---|---|---|---|---|---|---|---|---|---|
| 20 | 15 | 12 | 10 | 8 | 6 | 4 | 3 | 2 | 1 |

| Pos | Driver | NÜR1 (West Germany) | HOC (West Germany) | SAL (Austria) | WUN (West Germany) | ERD (West Germany) | NÜR2 (West Germany) | DIE (West Germany) | ZOL (Belgium) | NÜR3 (West Germany) | KAS (West Germany) | Points |
|---|---|---|---|---|---|---|---|---|---|---|---|---|
| 1 | (Denmark) John Nielsen | **3** | 1 | | 1 | **1** | **Ret** | **1** | 1 | **Ret** | 4 | 140 |
| 2 | (Switzerland) Bruno Eichmann | Ret | **2** | **1** | **2** | 2 | Ret | 2 | **2** | Ret | 8 | 110 |
| 3 | (Austria) Gerhard Berger | 16 | 6 | 4 | 3 | 5 | Ret | 10 | 3 | 4 | 9 | 83 |
| 4 | (West Germany) Josef Kaufmann | 12 | 3 | 3 | 7 | Ret | 2 | 9 | | 3 | 15 | 78 |
| 5 | (Austria) Franz Konrad | | | | | 6 | 1 | 7 | 8 | 1 | 11 | 63 |
| 6 | (West Germany) Hans-Peter Pandur | 23 | Ret | 5 | 5 | 9 | 3 | 3 | 4 | 6 | Ret | 59 |
| 7 | (West Germany) Helmut Bross | 14 | 4 | | 4 | | | | 7 | 2 | 12 | 57 |
| 8 | (West Germany) Thomas von Löwis | 21 | 10 | 6 | 16 | 4 | Ret | 5 | 5 | 8 | 10 | 52 |
| 9 | (West Germany) Peter Wisskirchen | 22 | 12 | 8 | 6 | 8 | 4 | 6 | 6 | 7 | 16 | 45 |
| 10 | (West Germany) Rudi Seher | | 9 | | 10 | 3 | 12 | | | | Ret | 18 |
| 11 | (West Germany) Peter Katsarski | Ret | 7 | 7 | 12 | 7 | 7 | Ret | Ret | | | 18 |
| 12 | (West Germany) Manfred Hebben | 19 | 11 | Ret | Ret | | Ret | | DNS | 5 | 18 | 17 |
| 13 | (West Germany) Henning Hagenbauer | 17 | 5 | 12 | 14 | | | | | | | 16 |
| 14 | (Austria) Walter Lechner | | | 2 | | | | | | | | 15 |
| 15 | (West Germany) Uwe Teuscher | | | | 11 | Ret | 5 | 11 | Ret | DNS | | 11 |
| 16 | (United Kingdom) Donald Bradway | DNQ | Ret | Ret | 15 | 13 | 9 | 13 | 10 | Ret | | 7 |
| 17 | (West Germany) Nicky Nufer | DNQ | 13 | 10 | 9 | 15 | 10 | Ret | Ret | Ret | Ret | 7 |
| 18 | (Austria) Karl Hasenbichler | 20 | | 9 | 17 | Ret | | | | | | 6 |
| 19 | (West Germany) Jan Thoelke | 24 | | Ret | | Ret | 11 | DNS | 9 | Ret | Ret | 4 |
| 20 | (West Germany) Jürgen Endres | | | | | | | | | 9 | | 2 |
| 21 | (West Germany) Willi Husgen | | | | | | 13 | | | 10 | | 1 |
| | (West Germany) Hubert Grün | | | | | 15 | | | | 11 | | 0 |
| | (Switzerland) Dieter Heinzelmann | | | 11 | | | | | | | | 0 |
| | (West Germany) Heinrich Heintz | DNQ | | | | | 14 | | 14 | 13 | Ret | 0 |
| | (West Germany) Bernd Suckow | DNQ | DNS | | | | Ret | | 13 | DNS | | 0 |
| | (West Germany) Karl-Heinz Soll | | | | 13 | | | | | | | 0 |
| | (West Germany) Erich Leitner | | | | | 14 | | | | | | 0 |
| | (West Germany) Michael Kahnt | | Ret | | | | | | | | | 0 |
| | (Austria) Theodor Erhard | | | Ret | | | | | | | | 0 |
| | (West Germany) Harald Brutschin | | | | | Ret | | | | | | 0 |
| | (West Germany) Erich Rostek | | DNS | | | | | | | | | 0 |
| | (West Germany) Erwin Derichs | | | | DNS | | | | | | | 0 |
| | (West Germany) Herbert Rostek | | | | DNS | | | | | | | 0 |
| | (West Germany) Jürgen Kurze | | | | | DNS | | | | | | 0 |
| | (West Germany) Arnold Wagner | | | | | | DNS | | | Ret | | 0 |
| | (West Germany) Wolfgang Simon | DNQ | | | | | | | | | | 0 |
| | (West Germany) Karl Schäfer | DNQ | | | | | DNS | | | | | 0 |
| | (West Germany) Harald Tonat | DNQ | | | | | | | | | | 0 |
| | (Switzerland) Urs Dudler | DNQ | | | | | | | | | DNS | 0 |
| | (Switzerland) Jean-Pierre Trachsel | DNQ | | | | | | | | | | 0 |
| | (West Germany) Herbert Lingmann | DNQ | | DNS | | | | | | | | 0 |
guest drivers ineligible to score points
| | (Italy) Emanuele Pirro | 4 | | | | | | | | | 1 | 0 |
| | (Argentina) Oscar Larrauri | 1 | | | | | | | | | **Ret** | 0 |
| | (Switzerland) Jo Zeller | 13 | | | | | | | | | 2 | 0 |
| | (France) Alain Ferté | 2 | | | | | | | | | | 0 |
| | (Argentina) Enrique Benamo | | | | | | | | | | 3 | 0 |
| | (Denmark) Henri Ronnberg | | | | 7 | 11 | 6 | 4 | | | | 0 |
| | (Belgium) Didier Theys | 5 | | | | | | | | | 6 | 0 |
| | (France) Philippe Alliot | 6 | | | | | | | | | | 0 |
| | (Italy) Roberto Ravaglia | 7 | | | | | | | | | 7 | 0 |
| | (Denmark) Kris Nissen | | | | | | 8 | 9 | | | | 0 |
| | (Italy) Paolo Giangrossi | 8 | | | | | | | | | | 0 |
| | (Switzerland) Hanspeter Kaufmann | | 8 | | | | | | | | | 0 |
| | (Italy) Claudio Langes | 9 | | | | | | | | | 5 | 0 |
| | (Sweden) Thorbjörn Carlsson | 10 | | | | | | | | | | 0 |
| | (Switzerland) Jürg-Pascal Vogt | | | | | 10 | | | | | | 0 |
| | (Switzerland) Jakob Bordoli | 11 | | | | | | | | | 14 | 0 |
| | (Belgium) Maurice Roger | | | | | | | | 11 | 12 | | 0 |
| | (Sweden) Leo Andersson | | | | | | | 11 | | | | 0 |
| | (Switzerland) Bruno Huber | | | | | 12 | | | | | 17 | 0 |
| | (Netherlands) Arie Luyendijk | | | | | | | | 12 | Ret | | 0 |
| | (Switzerland) Bruno Corradi | | | | | | | | | | 13 | 0 |
| | (Switzerland) Pierre-Alain Lombardi | 14 | | | | | | | | | | 0 |
| | (Sweden) Ake Jansson | | | | | | | 14 | | | | 0 |
| | (United Kingdom) Bob Birrell | | | | | | | 15 | | | | 0 |
| | (Switzerland) Louis Maulini | 18 | | | | | | | | | | 0 |
| | (Belgium) Herve Roger | | | | | | | | | | 19 | 0 |
| | (Italy) Ignazio Rizza | | Ret | | | | | | | DNS | | 0 |
| | (Italy) Giulio Regosa | | | | | | | | | | Ret | 0 |
| | (Belgium) Alexandre Neefs | | | | | | | | DNS | | | 0 |
| Pos | Driver | NÜR1 (West Germany) | HOC (West Germany) | SAL (Austria) | WUN (West Germany) | ERD (West Germany) | NÜR2 (West Germany) | DIE (West Germany) | ZOL (Belgium) | NÜR3 (West Germany) | KAS (West Germany) | Points |

| Colour | Result |
|---|---|
| Gold | Winner |
| Silver | Second place |
| Bronze | Third place |
| Green | Points classification |
| Blue | Non-points classification |
| Blue | Non-classified finish (NC) |
| Purple | Retired, not classified (Ret) |
| Red | Did not qualify (DNQ) |
| Red | Did not pre-qualify (DNPQ) |
| Black | Disqualified (DSQ) |
| White | Did not start (DNS) |
| White | Withdrew (WD) |
| White | Race cancelled (C) |
| Blank | Did not practice (DNP) |
| Blank | Did not arrive (DNA) |
| Blank | Excluded (EX) |

**Bold** – Pole
Italics – Fastest Lap
