= 1975 German Formula Three Championship =

Seasons
- ← 1974 1976 →

The 1975 German Formula Three Championship (German: 1975 ONS Pokal der Formel 3) was a multi-event motor racing championship for single-seat open wheel formula racing cars held in Germany. The championship featured drivers competing in two-litre Formula Three racing cars which conformed to the technical regulations, or formula, for the championship. It commenced on 31 March at Nürburgring and ended at Hockenheimring on 30 November after thirteen rounds.

Jägermeister Racing Team driver Ernst Maring became a champion. He won five races. Bertram Schäfer finished as runner-up, winning the race Sembach, Hockenheim and Ulm-Mengen. Gunnar Nordström completed the top-three in the drivers' standings with a win at Nürburgring. Rudolf Dötsch, Freddy Kottulinsky and Marc Surer were the only other drivers who were able to win a race in the season.

== Calendar ==
All rounds were held in West Germany.

Round	Location	Circuit	Date	Supporting
1	Nürburg, West Germany	Nürburgring	31 March	X. ADAC-300-km-Rennen um den "Good Year-Pokal"
2	Sembach, West Germany	Sembach Kaserne	4 May	AvD/ISCC-Flugplatzrennen Sembach
3	Saarlouis, West Germany	Saarlouis	11 May	2. ADAC Saarlouis "ADAC-Saarland-Trophy"
4	Nürburg, West Germany	Nürburgring	31 May	XXI. ADAC 1000 km Rennen
5	Berlin, West Germany	AVUS	22 June	DMV/BAC/AvD-Avus-Rennen "Preis von Berlin"
6	Hockenheim, West Germany	Hockenheimring	6 July	5. ADAC "Preis der Stadt Karlsruhe"
7	Hockenheim, West Germany	Hockenheimring	20 July	ADAC-Südwestpokal-Rennen
8	Wunstorf, West Germany	Wunstorf Air Base	27 July	ADAC Flugplatz-Rennen Wunstorf
9	Kassel-Calden, West Germany	Kassel-Calden Circuit	17 August	ADAC-Hessen-Preis
10	Nürburg, West Germany	Nürburgring	7 September	II. ADAC Super Sprint
11	Ulm-Mengen, West Germany	Ulm-Mengen	14 September	10. ADAC-Rundstreckenrennen Ulm-Mengen
12	Hockenheim, West Germany	Hockenheimring	9 November	5. ADAC-Rheintal-Rundstreckenrennen
13	Hockenheim, West Germany	Hockenheimring	30 November	AvD/MHSTC Saison-Finale Hockenheim

== Championship standings ==
- Points are awarded as follows:

1	2	3	4	5	6	7	8	9	10
20	15	12	10	8	6	4	3	2	1

Pos	Driver	NÜR1	SEM	SAA	NÜR2	AVU	HOC1	HOC2	WUN	KAS	NÜR3	ULM	HOC3	HOC4	Points
1	(West Germany) Ernst Maring	1			4	4	1	1			1	2	2	1	150
2	(West Germany) Bertram Schäfer		1	2		5	3	8	2	2		1	1	2	143
3	(Sweden) Gunnar Nordström	2			3	1		2	1			4	4		102
4	(West Germany) Rudolf Dötsch			1			2				3	5	6	5	69
5	(West Germany) Gernot Lamby		2			3		7	3	3					55
6	(Sweden) Freddy Kottulinsky	3			1			3	5						52
7	(West Germany) Günter Kölmel			5	9		4	9	6	4		3			50
8	(West Germany) Dieter Kern				2			4					5	3	45
9	(West Germany) Heinz Lange							6			2		3	4	43
10	(West Germany) Manfred Leppke				6	2	6		4			7			41
11	(Switzerland) Marc Surer		3							1					32
12	(United States) Steve Farnsworth			3				5							20
13	(West Germany) Werner Fischer			4	7							8			17
14	(West Germany) Erwin Derichs					8			7	5		9			17
15	(West Germany) Thomas von Löwis						5			6					14
16	(West Germany) Jochen Dauer				8	6		10	8						13
17	(United Kingdom) Jerry Blaine		4												10
18	(West Germany) Kurt Pfunder			6			7								10
19	(West Germany) Bernhard Brack				5										8
20	(West Germany) Josef Kremer			7											4
21	(West Germany) Erhard Miltz					7									4
22	(West Germany) Heinz Schaltinat				10										1
Pos	Driver	NÜR1	SEM	SAA	NÜR2	AVU	HOC1	HOC2	WUN	KAS	NÜR3	ULM	HOC3	HOC4	Points

Colour	Result
Gold	Winner
Silver	Second place
Bronze	Third place
Green	Points classification
Blue	Non-points classification
Blue	Non-classified finish (NC)
Purple	Retired, not classified (Ret)
Red	Did not qualify (DNQ)
Red	Did not pre-qualify (DNPQ)
Black	Disqualified (DSQ)
White	Did not start (DNS)
White	Withdrew (WD)
White	Race cancelled (C)
Blank	Did not practice (DNP)
Blank	Did not arrive (DNA)
Blank	Excluded (EX)

**Bold** – Pole
Italics – Fastest Lap
