= 1980 German Formula Three Championship =

Multi-event motor racing championship held in Germany in 1980

Seasons
- ← 1979 1981 →

The 1980 German Formula Three Championship (German: 1980 Deutsche Formel-3-Meisterschaft) was a multi-event motor racing championship for single-seat open wheel formula racing cars held in Germany. The championship featured drivers competing in two-litre Formula Three racing cars which conformed to the technical regulations, or formula, for the championship. It commenced on 30 March at Nürburgring and ended at Kassel-Calden on 5 October after seven rounds.

Bertram Schäfer Racing driver Frank Jelinski became a champion. He won round at Diepholz Airfield Circuit. His teammate and title rival Wolfgang Klein, who lost just by one point won races at Nürburgring and Siegerland. Franz Kondrad completed the top-three in the drivers' standings. Harald Brutschin, Peter Kroeber, Michele Alboreto and Thierry Boutsen were the only other drivers who were able to win a race in the season.

== Teams and drivers ==
Entry List
Team	Driver	Chassis	Engine	Rounds
(France) Automobiles Martini	(Belgium) Thierry Boutsen	Martini MK31/003	Toyota	1, 7
(France) Automobiles Martini	(Italy) Mauro Baldi	Martini MK31/008	Toyota	1, 7
(France) Automobiles Martini	(France) Philippe Alliot	Martini MK31	Toyota	1, 7
(West Germany) Bertram Schäfer Racing	(West Germany) Harald Brutschin	Ralt RT3/176	Toyota	1–2, 4–7
(West Germany) Bertram Schäfer Racing	(West Germany) Frank Jelinski	Ralt RT3/177	Toyota	1–2, 4–7
(West Germany) Bertram Schäfer Racing	(West Germany) Wolfgang Klein	Ralt RT3/175	Toyota	1–2, 4–7
(Sweden) Bewa Fritid	(Sweden) Thomas Kaiser	Ralt RT1/14	Toyota	4
(Belgium) Bovy Racing Cars	(Belgium) Quirin Bovy	Bovy PB4	Toyota	7
(West Germany) Derichs Rennwagen	(West Germany) Heinz Beissler	Derichs D380/02	Toyota	1–4, 6–7
(West Germany) Derichs Rennwagen	(West Germany) Arno Derichs	Derichs D37/F3-78-04	Toyota	2, 4–6
(West Germany) Derichs Rennwagen	(West Germany) Erwin Derichs	Derichs D37/F3-78-04	Toyota	7
(West Germany) Derichs Rennwagen	(West Germany) Jürgen Schlich	Derichs D380/01	Toyota	1–4, 6–7
(Austria) Deutsche Renault AG	(Austria) Jo Gartner	Martini MK27	Renault	1
(West Germany) Druck Chemie — Partner der Druckindustrie	(West Germany) Roland Binder	Chevron B43	Toyota	1
(West Germany) Druck Chemie — Partner der Druckindustrie	(West Germany) Edgar Pohl	Chevron B43	Toyota	4
(West Germany) Druck Chemie — Partner der Druckindustrie	(West Germany) Helmut Bross	Chevron B47/47–79–02	Toyota	1–6
(France) Ecurie Motul Nogaro	(France) Philippe Streiff	Martini MK31	Toyota	1, 6
(West Germany) Ernst Maring	(West Germany) Ernst Maring	Maco 381/M024	Toyota	1
(Italy) Euroracing	(Italy) Michele Alboreto	March 803/3	Alfa Romeo	1, 7
(Italy) Euroracing	(Italy) Corrado Fabi	March 803/5	Alfa Romeo	1, 7
(West Germany) Eusebius Hopfer	(West Germany) Eusebius Hopfer	March 783	Toyota	1–5
(Switzerland) Formel Rennsport Club	(Switzerland) Bruno Eichmann	Argo JM6	BMW	1, 5
(Switzerland) Formel Rennsport Club	(Switzerland) Bruno Huber	Argo JM1/006-F3	Toyota	3, 7
(Switzerland) Formel Rennsport Club	(Switzerland) Jo Zeller	March 793	Toyota	7
(West Germany) Günther Köbele	(West Germany) Günther Köbele	Chevron	BMW	3–4
(West Germany) Hans-Joachim Hösch	(West Germany) Hans-Joachim Hösch	Chevron B43	Toyota	3, 5, 7
(West Germany) Heidsieck Monopole Racing Team	(West Germany) Peter Kroeber	March 783	Toyota	1–2
(West Germany) Heidsieck Monopole Racing Team	(West Germany) Harald Brutschin	March 783	Toyota	3
(West Germany) Heidsieck Monopole Racing Team	(West Germany) Gero Fleck	March 793	Toyota	1–6
(West Germany) Heidsieck Monopole Racing Team	(United Kingdom) Donald Bradway	March 793	Toyota	7
(West Germany) Heidsieck Monopole Racing Team	(West Germany) Uwe Teuscher	March 793	Toyota	6–7
(West Germany) Heinrich Heintz	(West Germany) Heinrich Heintz	Ralt RT1/23	BMW	1–2, 4
(West Germany) Helmut Bross Racing	(West Germany) Thomas von Löwis	Chevron B43	Toyota	5
(West Germany) Helmut Leitner	(West Germany) Helmut Leitner	Chevron B47	Toyota	3
(West Germany) Jan Thoelke	(West Germany) Jan Thoelke	Ralt RT1	Toyota	4, 6
(West Germany) Josef Kaufmann Racing	(West Germany) Josef Kaufmann	Ralt RT1/101	Toyota	4
(West Germany) Josef Kaufmann Racing	(Austria) "James Bald"	Ralt RT1/101	Toyota	5
(West Germany) Karl-Heinz Soll	(West Germany) Karl-Heinz Soll	Maco 377/M008	Toyota	2, 4, 6
(West Germany) Klaus Zimmermann Racing Team	(West Germany) Hans-Georg Bürger	Ralt RT3/168	Toyota	1
(Austria) Konrad Racing	(Austria) Franz Konrad	March 793/4	Toyota	All
(West Germany) Lista Racing Team	(West Germany) Jürg Lienhard	March 803	Toyota	1
(Switzerland) Manuel Valls	(Switzerland) Manuel Valls	Martini MK31	Toyota	7
(Netherlands) Michael Bleekemolen	(Netherlands) Michael Bleekemolen	Ralt RT1/101	Toyota	1
(West Germany) Mike Korten Motorsport	(West Germany) Thomas Kloss	March 803	Toyota	1
(West Germany) Mike Korten Motorsport	(West Germany) Michael Korten	March 803/14	Renault	4
(West Germany) MSC Rhön	(West Germany) Herbert Lingmann	Ralt RT1	Toyota	All
(West Germany) Peter Bonk	(West Germany) Peter Bonk	Derichs D35/F3-75-01	Toyota	6
(West Germany) Peter Cornand	(West Germany) Peter Cornand	Ralt RT1	Toyota	1–5, 7
(West Germany) Peter Kroeber	(West Germany) Peter Kroeber	Chevron B47	Toyota	3–4
(West Germany) Peter Wicks	(West Germany) Peter Wicks	Chevron B38	Toyota	1–2
(West Germany) Peter Wisskirchen	(West Germany) Peter Wisskirchen	Ralt RT1/137	Toyota	1–2, 5–6
(Switzerland) Philipp Müller	(Switzerland) Philipp Müller	Ralt RT1/21	BMW	1
(Italy) Racing Team Astra Marlboro	(Italy) Daniele Albertin	Martini MK31	Toyota	1
(Italy) Racing Team Astra Marlboro	(Argentina) Oscar Larrauri	Martini MK31/015	Toyota	1, 7
(West Germany) Rudi Seher	(West Germany) Rudi Seher	Chevron B43	Toyota	1–5
(Denmark) Sodastream Racing with Jac Nellemann	(Denmark) Kurt Thiim	Chevron B38/38–77–17	Toyota	1, 7
(Switzerland) Squadra Caposcarico	(Switzerland) Marcel Wettstein	Ralt RT1/59	Toyota	1
(West Germany) Thomas Holert	(West Germany) Thomas Holert	March 803	Toyota	1–2, 4–5, 7
(Sweden) Thorbjörn Carlsson	(Sweden) Thorbjörn Carlsson	Ralt RT1/110	Toyota	1, 4
(West Germany) Volkswagen Motorsport — Team Gebhardt	(West Germany) Günter Gebhardt	March 783/29	Volkswagen	1–2, 4

== Calendar ==
Round	Location	Circuit	Date	Supporting
1	Nürburg, West Germany	Nürburgring	30 March	XV. ADAC Goodyear 300 km Rennen
2	Nürburg, West Germany	Nürburgring	24 May	XXVI. ADAC 1000 km Rennen
3	Erding, West Germany	Erding Air Base	29 June	ADAC-Flugplatz-Rennen Erding
4	Nürburg, West Germany	Nürburgring	20 July	V. ADAC-Nürburgring-Trophy "Preis von Luxembourg"
5	Diepholz, West Germany	Diepholz Airfield Circuit	27 July	13. ADAC-Flugplatzrennen Diepholz
6	Siegerland, West Germany	Siegerland Airport	14 September	3. ADAC Siegerland Flughafenrennen
7	Kassel-Calden, West Germany	Kassel-Calden Circuit	5 October	ADAC-Hessen-Preis

== Results ==
Round	Circuit	Pole position	Fastest lap	Winning driver	Winning team
1	Nürburgring	(Belgium) Thierry Boutsen	(France) Philippe Alliot	(Belgium) Thierry Boutsen	(France) Automobiles Martini
2	Nürburgring	(West Germany) Günter Gebhardt	(West Germany) Wolfgang Klein	(West Germany) Wolfgang Klein	(West Germany) Bertram Schäfer Racing
3	Erding Air Base	(West Germany) Harald Brutschin	(West Germany) Harald Brutschin	(West Germany) Peter Kroeber	(West Germany) Peter Kroeber
4	Nürburgring	(West Germany) Harald Brutschin	(West Germany) Michael Korten	(West Germany) Harald Brutschin	(West Germany) Bertram Schäfer Racing
5	Diepholz Airfield Circuit	(Switzerland) Bruno Eichmann	(West Germany) Wolfgang Klein	(West Germany) Frank Jelinski	(West Germany) Bertram Schäfer Racing
6	Siegerland Airport	(West Germany) Harald Brutschin	(West Germany) Hans-Peter Pandur	(West Germany) Wolfgang Klein	(West Germany) Bertram Schäfer Racing
7	Kassel-Calden Circuit	(Italy) Michele Alboreto	(Italy) Corrado Fabi	(Italy) Michele Alboreto	(Italy) Euroracing

== Championship standings ==
- Points are awarded as follows:

1	2	3	4	5	6	7	8	9	10
20	15	12	10	8	6	4	3	2	1

Pos	Driver	NÜR1	NÜR2	ERD	NÜR3	DIE	SIE	KAS	Points
1	(West Germany) Frank Jelinski	5	3		3	1	2	Ret	79
2	(West Germany) Wolfgang Klein	Ret	1		4	5	1	6	78
3	(Austria) Franz Konrad	11	4	2	7	4	11	12	66
4	(West Germany) Helmut Bross	14	5	3	6	3	3		58
5	(West Germany) Harald Brutschin	12	14	**14**	**1**	2	**Ret**	Ret	47
6	(West Germany) Peter Kroeber	13	6	1	19				36
7	(West Germany) Günter Gebhardt	23	**2**		5				23
8	(West Germany) Herbert Lingmann	Ret	DNS	6	11	Ret	4	Ret	17
9	(West Germany) Michael Korten				2				15
10	(West Germany) Uwe Teuscher						Ret	10	15
11	(West Germany) Jürgen Schlich	20	10	8	DNS		5	Ret	15
12	(West Germany) Eusebius Hopfer	19	7	4	Ret	DNS			14
13	(West Germany) Peter Cornand	Ret	8	13	DNQ	12		16	13
14	(West Germany) Rudi Seher	Ret	Ret	5	15	8			11
15	(West Germany) Hans-Joachim Hösch			10		11		17	10
16	(West Germany) Jan Thoelke				9		6		9
17	(West Germany) Gero Fleck	Ret	9	15	16	9	7		8
18	(West Germany) Roland Binder	16							6
19	(West Germany) Peter Wisskirchen	Ret	Ret			6	Ret		6
20	(West Germany) Hans-Georg Bürger	17							4
21	(West Germany) Thomas von Löwis					7			4
22	(West Germany) Thomas Kloss	18							3
23	(West Germany) Gunther Kobele			9	DNQ				3
24	(West Germany) Arno Derichs		15		14	13	8		3
25	(West Germany) Josef Kaufmann				10				2
26	(West Germany) Peter Bonk						9		2
27	(West Germany) Heinz Beissler	21	DNS	11	18	Ret			2
28	(West Germany) Thomas Holert	Ret	12		17	10		Ret	1
29	(West Germany) Karl-Heinz Soll		13		DNQ		10		1
	(West Germany) Heinrich Heintz	Ret	11		DNQ				0
	(West Germany) Helmut Leitner			12					0
	(West Germany) Edgar Pohl				13				0
	(Switzerland) Marcel Wettstein	22							0
	(Switzerland) Bruno Eichmann	24				**DNS**			0
	(West Germany) Peter Wicks	Ret	Ret						0
	(West Germany) Jürg Lienhardt	Ret							0
	(Austria) "James Bald"					Ret			0
	(United Kingdom) Donald Bradway							Ret	0
	(West Germany) Ernst Maring							Ret	0
	(West Germany) Erwin Derichs							Ret	0
	(West Germany) Manfred Hebben		DNS		DNQ				0
	(West Germany) Heribert Böck			DNS					0
	(Switzerland) Daniel Bürger					DNS			0
	(West Germany) Willi Hüsgen				DNQ				0
	(West Germany) Dietmar Flöer				DNQ				0
	(Switzerland) Georges Ansermoz				DNQ				0
guest drivers ineligible to score points
	(Italy) Michele Alboreto	3						**1**	0
	(Belgium) Thierry Boutsen	**1**						4	0
	(Italy) Corrado Fabi	6						2	0
	(France) Philippe Alliot	2						11	0
	(France) Philippe Streiff	7						3	0
	(Italy) Mauro Baldi	4						5	0
	(Switzerland) Bruno Huber			7				13	0
	(Denmark) Kurt Thiim	Ret						7	0
	(Netherlands) Michael Bleekemolen	8							0
	(Sweden) Thomas Kaiser				8				0
	(Switzerland) Jo Zeller							8	0
	(Argentina) Oscar Larrauri	10						9	0
	(Italy) Daniele Albertin	9							0
	(Sweden) Thorbjörn Carlsson	15			12				0
	(Switzerland) Manuel Valls							14	0
	(Belgium) Quirin Bovy							15	0
	(Austria) Jo Gartner	Ret							0
	(Switzerland) Philipp Müller	Ret							0
	(France) Patrick Lancelot							DNQ	0
	(Belgium) Pierre Petit							DNQ	0
Pos	Driver	NÜR1	NÜR2	ERD	NÜR3	DIE	SIE	KAS	Points

Colour	Result
Gold	Winner
Silver	Second place
Bronze	Third place
Green	Points classification
Blue	Non-points classification
Blue	Non-classified finish (NC)
Purple	Retired, not classified (Ret)
Red	Did not qualify (DNQ)
Red	Did not pre-qualify (DNPQ)
Black	Disqualified (DSQ)
White	Did not start (DNS)
White	Withdrew (WD)
White	Race cancelled (C)
Blank	Did not practice (DNP)
Blank	Did not arrive (DNA)
Blank	Excluded (EX)

**Bold** – Pole
Italics – Fastest Lap
