= 1983 German Formula Three Championship =

Seasons
- ← 1982 1984 →

The 1983 German Formula Three Championship (German: 1983 Deutsche Formel-3-Meisterschaft) was a multi-event motor racing championship for single-seat open wheel formula racing cars held in Germany, Belgium and Austria. The championship featured drivers competing in two-litre Formula Three racing cars which conformed to the technical regulations, or formula, for the championship. It commenced on 1 May at AVUS and ended at Zolder on 21 August after eight rounds.

Scuderia Teutonia driver Franz Konrad became a champion. He took wins Nürburgring and Kaufbeuren. His title rival Hans-Peter Pandur, who lost just by two points won races at Erding and Diepholz Airfield Circuit. Volker Weidler won race at Wunstorf and completed the top-three in the drivers' standings. Harald Brutschin, Rudi Seher and Marc Duez were the only other drivers who were able to win a race in the season.

== Teams and drivers ==
Entry List
Team	No.	Driver	Chassis	Engine	Rounds
(West Germany) Bertram Schäfer Racing	1	(West Germany) Harald Brutschin	Ralt RT3/399	Alfa Romeo	1–6
(West Germany) Bertram Schäfer Racing	1	(Finland) Harri Kangas	Ralt RT3/399	Alfa Romeo	7
(West Germany) Bertram Schäfer Racing	2	(Austria) Bartl Stadler	Ralt RT3/400	Alfa Romeo	1–3
(West Germany) Bertram Schäfer Racing	2	(West Germany) Joachim Winkelhock	Ralt RT3/400	Alfa Romeo	5
(West Germany) Bertram Schäfer Racing	2	(West Germany) Peter Oberndorfer	Ralt RT3/400	Alfa Romeo	6
(West Germany) Bertram Schäfer Racing	3	(Sweden) Thomas Kaiser	Ralt RT3/400	Alfa Romeo	7
(West Germany) Bertram Schäfer Racing	30	(Finland) Harri Kangas	Ralt RT3/400	Alfa Romeo	1–6, 8
(West Germany) Josef Kaufmann Racing	3	(West Germany) Josef Kaufmann	Martini MK34/016	Toyota	8
(West Germany) Josef Kaufmann Racing	4	(West Germany) Josef Kaufmann	Martini MK35	Volkswagen	1, 3–7
(West Germany) Josef Kaufmann Racing	4	(Switzerland) Bruno Eichmann	Martini MK35	Volkswagen	2
(West Germany) Josef Kaufmann Racing	5	(West Germany) Thomas Bertschinger	Martini MK34/016	Toyota	1–4
(West Germany) Josef Kaufmann Racing	5	(Netherlands) Cor Euser	Martini MK34/016	Toyota	7
(West Germany) Peter Wisskirchen	6	(West Germany) Peter Wisskirchen	Ralt RT3	Volkswagen	1, 3–8
(West Germany) Karamalz Team	7	(West Germany) Thomas von Löwis	Anson SA3	Toyota	All
(West Germany) Team Maredo Steak&Salat	9	(West Germany) Hans-Peter Pandur	Ralt RT3	Volkswagen	All
(West Germany) Helmut Bross	10	(West Germany) Helmut Bross	Ralt RT3	Toyota	1–7
(Switzerland) Squadra Caposcarico	10	(Switzerland) Peter Buess	March 783/6		7
(Austria) Scuderia Teutonia	11	(Austria) Franz Konrad	Anson SA4	Volkswagen	All
(Austria) Scuderia Teutonia	12	(West Germany) Karl-Heinz Wieschalla	March 813	Toyota	1
(Austria) Scuderia Teutonia	12	(West Germany) Artur Deutgen	March 813	Toyota	2
(Austria) Scuderia Teutonia	12	(West Germany) Gernot Sirrenburg	March 803B/1	Toyota	6
(Belgium) Maurice Roger	12	(Belgium) Maurice Roger	Chevron B47/47–79–02	Toyota	6–7
(West Germany) Ford Autoveri Motorsport	38	(West Germany) Peter Katsarski	Ralt RT3	Toyota	All
(West Germany) Uwe Teuscher	14	(West Germany) Uwe Teuscher	March 813	Toyota	All
(West Germany) Thomas Holert	15	(West Germany) Thomas Holert	March 803B/14	Alfa Romeo	4–8
(Belgium) Belgian Volkswagen Club	16	(Belgium) Marc Duez	Ralt RT3	Volkswagen	3, 8
(West Germany) McGregor Sportswear	17	(West Germany) Rudi Seher	Anson SA3/002	Toyota	All
(West Germany) McGregor Sportswear	35	(Switzerland) Dieter Heinzelmann	Ralt RT3	Toyota	All
(West Germany) EMSC Bitburg	18	(West Germany) Manfred Hebben	Ralt RT3	Toyota	1–2, 6–8
(West Germany) EMSC Bitburg	18	(West Germany) Bodo Beil	Ralt RT3	Toyota	3
(West Germany) Nicky Nufer	19	(West Germany) Nicky Nufer	Ralt RT3/202	Toyota	All
(West Germany) MSC Scuderia Mitwitz	20	(West Germany) Justin Sünkel	Argo JM10	Toyota	7–8
(West Germany) Sinziger Mineralbrunnen	22	(West Germany) Heinrich Heintz	Ralt RT1/23	Toyota	3, 8
(West Germany) Jan Thoelke	23	(West Germany) Jan Thoelke	March 813/6	Toyota	All
(West Germany) Willi Hüsgen	24	(West Germany) Willi Hüsgen	Maco 376/M013	Toyota	1–2, 4
(West Germany) Otto Christmann	24	(West Germany) Otto Christmann	Martini MK31	Toyota	8
(Switzerland) Barron Racing Team	25	(United Kingdom) John Bosch	Ralt RT3	Toyota	2, 7
(West Germany) Erwin Derichs	27	(West Germany) Pit Bilger	Derichs D37/F3-78-02	Toyota	1–4
(Austria) Walter Lechner Racing School	28	(Austria) Johann Reindl	Ralt RT3/397	Volkswagen	4–5
(Austria) Walter Lechner Racing School	28	(Austria) Franz Tost	Ralt RT3/397	Volkswagen	6
(Austria) Walter Lechner Racing School	28	(West Germany) Harald Brutschin	Ralt RT3/397	Volkswagen	7
(Austria) Walter Lechner Racing School	29	(West Germany) Volker Weidler	Ralt RT3	Volkswagen	All
(West Germany) Bernd Suckow	31	(West Germany) Bernd Suckow	Chevron B47	Toyota	2–3
(West Germany) Andy Wietzke	32	(West Germany) Andy Wietzke	Anson SA3/005	Alfa Romeo	All
(United Kingdom) Bob Birrell	33	(United Kingdom) Bob Birrell	March 803	Toyota	2, 6–8
(West Germany) Gernot Sirrenburg	36	(West Germany) Gernot Sirrenburg	Chevron B47	Toyota	1–2, 4–5, 8
(West Germany) Gerd Lünsmann	37	(West Germany) Gerd Lünsmann	Ralt RT1/137	Toyota	4, 7–8
(West Germany) Alexander Seibold	39	(West Germany) Alexander Seibold	Martini MK31/003	Toyota	1–6
(Sweden) Caratom F3 Racing	41	(Sweden) Hasse Thaung	Ralt RT3	Toyota	3
(Finland) Braun Racing Team	42	(Finland) Jari Nurminen	March 813	Toyota	1–2, 4, 7
(Switzerland) Formel Rennsport Club	42	(Switzerland) Bruno Huber	Argo JM1/006-F3	Toyota	3, 5–6
(Switzerland) Formel Rennsport Club	44	(Switzerland) Josef Binder	Argo JM8	Toyota	3
(United Kingdom) Penthouse Racing Team	43	(United Kingdom) Donald Bradway	March 813	Toyota	1
(West Germany) Pedrazza Motorsport	43	(West Germany) Walter Pedrazza	Lola		5
(West Germany) Paul Schild	44	(West Germany) Paul Schild	Ralt RT3		6
(West Germany) Karl-Heinz Soll	46	(West Germany) Karl-Heinz Soll	Ralt RT1	Toyota	2–3
(West Germany) Erich Höhmann	47	(West Germany) Erich Höhmann	Martini MK31	Toyota	6
(Sweden) Thorbjörn Carlsson	48	(Sweden) Thorbjörn Carlsson	Ralt RT3/244	Toyota	3

== Calendar ==
Round	Location	Circuit	Date	Supporting
1	Berlin, West Germany	AVUS	1 May	ADAC-Avus-Rennen
2	Mainz, West Germany	Mainz-Finthen Airport	15 May	AvD/HMSC Flugplatzrennen Mainz-Finthen
3	Nürburg, West Germany	Nürburgring	28 May	Bitburger ADAC 1000 km Rennen
4	Wunstorf, West Germany	Wunstorf Air Base	12 June	ADAC-Flugplatzrennen Wunstorf
5	Kaufbeuren, West Germany	Kaufbeuren Air Base	19 June	ADAC-Flugplatzrennen Kaufbeuren
6	Erding, West Germany	Erding Air Base	10 July	6. ADAC-Flugplatz-Rennen Erding
7	Diepholz, West Germany	Diepholz Airfield Circuit	24 July	XI. ADAC-Bilstein-Super-Sprint
8	Heusden-Zolder, Belgium	Circuit Zolder	21 August	17. ADAC Westfalen-Pokal-Rennen

== Results ==
Round	Circuit	Pole position	Fastest lap	Winning driver	Winning team
1	AVUS	(Austria) Bartl Stadler	(West Germany) Peter Wisskirchen	(West Germany) Rudi Seher	(West Germany) McGregor Sportswear
2	Mainz-Finthen Airport	(West Germany) Harald Brutschin	(West Germany) Harald Brutschin	(West Germany) Harald Brutschin	(West Germany) Bertram Schäfer Racing
3	Nürburgring	(West Germany) Helmut Bross	(Austria) Franz Konrad	(Austria) Franz Konrad	(Austria) Scuderia Teutonia
4	Wunstorf Air Base	(West Germany) Volker Weidler	(West Germany) Volker Weidler	(West Germany) Volker Weidler	(West Germany) Volkswagen Motorsport
5	Kaufbeuren Air Base	(West Germany) Volker Weidler	(Finland) Harri Kangas	(Austria) Franz Konrad	(Austria) Scuderia Teutonia
6	Erding Air Base	(West Germany) Andy Wietzke	(West Germany) Hans-Peter Pandur	(West Germany) Hans-Peter Pandur	(West Germany) Team Maredo Steak&Salat
7	Diepholz Airfield Circuit	(West Germany) Hans-Peter Pandur	(Finland) Harri Kangas	(West Germany) Hans-Peter Pandur	(West Germany) Team Maredo Steak&Salat
8	Circuit Zolder	(Belgium) Marc Duez	(West Germany) Volker Weidler	(Belgium) Marc Duez	(Austria) Belgian Volkswagen Club

== Championship standings ==
- Points are awarded as follows:

1	2	3	4	5	6	7	8	9	10
20	15	12	10	8	6	4	3	2	1

Pos	Driver	AVU	MAI	NÜR	WUN	KAU	ERD	DIE	ZOL	Points
1	(Austria) Franz Konrad	11	10	1	5	1	8	4	2	83
2	(West Germany) Hans-Peter Pandur	DNS	7	11	3	4	1	**1**	4	81
3	(West Germany) Volker Weidler	15	Ret	5	**1**	**3**	3	15	3	72
4	(West Germany) Uwe Teuscher	4	11	7	2	20	7	2	6	59
5	(Finland) Harri Kangas	DNS	2	23	4	2	12	5	8	52
6	(West Germany) Harald Brutschin	8	**1**	3	17	7	4	Ret		49
7	(West Germany) Rudi Seher	1	Ret	DNS	6	5	5	11	Ret	43
8	(West Germany) Nicky Nufer	2	DNS	16	9	Ret	Ret	8	7	26
9	(West Germany) Helmut Bross	DNS	DNS	**2**	10	14	10	6		23
10	(West Germany) Jan Thoelke	7	4	8	11	17	Ret	Ret	11	21
11	(West Germany) Peter Wisskirchen	14		9	Ret	8	9	9	5	20
12	(West Germany) Josef Kaufmann	9		6	12	9	6	Ret	Ret	18
13	(West Germany) Peter Katsarski	13	5	15	7	13	Ret	14	10	16
14	(West Germany) Thomas von Löwis	5	Ret	Ret	8	15	20	7	12	15
15	(West Germany) Andy Wietzke	Ret	6	22	15	6	**Ret**	18	DNS	14
16	(West Germany) Manfred Hebben	3	19				11	DNS	14	12
17	(West Germany) Peter Oberndorfer						3			12
18	(Netherlands) Cor Euser							3		12
19	(United Kingdom) Donald Bradway	6								6
20	(Austria) Bartl Stadler	**DNS**	9	10						5
21	(West Germany) Thomas Bertschinger	DNS	8	Ret	Ret					4
22	(West Germany) Thomas Holert				16	16	18	12	9	3
23	(Switzerland) Dieter Heinzelmann	10	18	18	Ret	19	21	17	16	1
24	(West Germany) Joachim Winkelhock					10				1
	(Switzerland) Bruno Huber			12		11	14			0
	(Austria) Johann Reindl				13	12				0
	(West Germany) Pit Bilger	12	13	17	DNS					0
	(West Germany) Artur Deutgen		12							0
	(West Germany) Bodo Beil			13						0
	(Sweden) Thomas Kaiser							13		0
	(West Germany) Otto Christmann								13	0
	(Finland) Jari Nurminen	DNS	Ret		14			16		0
	(Switzerland) Josef Binder			14						0
	(West Germany) Gernot Sirrenburg	16	Ret		Ret	18	16		15	0
	(Austria) Franz Tost						15			0
	(West Germany) Justin Sünkel							Ret	17	0
	(West Germany) Paul Schild						17			0
	(United Kingdom) Bob Birrell		DNS				DNQ	Ret	18	0
	(West Germany) Gerd Lünsmann				18			Ret	DNS	0
	(West Germany) Heinrich Heintz			19					DNS	0
	(West Germany) Willi Hüsgen	DNS	14		19					0
	(West Germany) Erich Höhmann						19			0
	(West Germany) Karl-Heinz Soll		15	20						0
	(West Germany) Alexander Seibold	DNS	DNQ	17	DNS	21	Ret			0
	(West Germany) Walter Pedrazza					22				0
	(West Germany) Bernd Suckow		Ret	DNS						0
	(Switzerland) Bruno Eichmann		Ret							0
	(Switzerland) Peter Buess							Ret		0
	(West Germany) Karl-Heinz Wieschalla	DNS								0
	(West Germany) Christian Nenning						DNS			0
	(West Germany) Herbert Rostek				DNS					0
guest drivers ineligible to score points
	(Belgium) Marc Duez			21					**1**	0
	(United Kingdom) John Bosch		3					DNS		0
	(Sweden) Thorbjörn Carlsson			4						0
	(Belgium) Maurice Roger						13	10		0
	(Sweden) Hasse Thaung			16						0
Pos	Driver	AVU	MAI	NÜR	WUN	KAU	ERD	DIE	ZOL	Points

Colour	Result
Gold	Winner
Silver	Second place
Bronze	Third place
Green	Points classification
Blue	Non-points classification
Blue	Non-classified finish (NC)
Purple	Retired, not classified (Ret)
Red	Did not qualify (DNQ)
Red	Did not pre-qualify (DNPQ)
Black	Disqualified (DSQ)
White	Did not start (DNS)
White	Withdrew (WD)
White	Race cancelled (C)
Blank	Did not practice (DNP)
Blank	Did not arrive (DNA)
Blank	Excluded (EX)

**Bold** – Pole
Italics – Fastest Lap
