= 1979 German Formula Three Championship =

Seasons
- ← 1978 1980 →

The 1979 German Formula Three Championship (German: 1979 Deutsche Formel-3-Meisterschaft) was a multi-event motor racing championship for single-seat open wheel formula racing cars held in Germany. The championship featured drivers competing in two-litre Formula Three racing cars which conformed to the technical regulations, or formula, for the championship. It commenced on 11 March at Circuit Zolder and ended at Kassel-Calden on 7 October after seven rounds (the first Nürburgring round was cancelled due to snowfall).

Klaus Zimmermann Racing Team driver Michael Korten became a champion. He won races at Fassberg, Nürburgring and Kassel-Calden. Hans-Georg Bürger won the race at Diepholz and finished as runner-up. Walter Lechner completed the top-three in the drivers' standings. Ernst Maring, Thierry Boutsen and Michael Bleekemolen were the only other drivers who were able to win a race in the season.

== Teams and drivers ==
Entry List
Team	Driver	Chassis	Engine	Rounds
(West Germany) AC Mayen	(West Germany) Konrad Heberer	Derichs D36/F3-76-01	BMW	1–2
(West Germany) Andy Wietzke	(West Germany) Andy Wietzke	Ralt RT1	Toyota	1–7
(Switzerland) Armin Conrad	(Switzerland) Armin Conrad	Argo JM1	Toyota	8
(West Germany) Auto Zeitung Nachwuchsförderung	(West Germany) Georg Bellof	Ralt RT3/168	Toyota	1–3, 5–8
(West Germany) Bernd Heuer	(West Germany) Bernd Heuer	Maco 376/M001	Ford	4
(West Germany) Bernd Wicks	(West Germany) Bernd Wicks	Chevron B38	Toyota	2–3, 5–7
(West Germany) Bertram Schäfer Racing	(West Germany) Harald Brutschin	Ralt RT1/122	Toyota	8
(West Germany) Bertram Schäfer Racing	(West Germany) Hans-Georg Bürger	Ralt RT1/49	Toyota	1–3, 5–8
(West Germany) Bertram Schäfer Racing	(West Germany) Heinrich Heintz	Ralt RT1/23	BMW	1–2, 4, 6–7
(West Germany) Bertram Schäfer Racing	(West Germany) Hannelore Werner	Ralt RT1/122	Toyota	7
(West Germany) Bose HiFi Racing Team	(Switzerland) Urs Dudler	Ralt RT1	BMW	8
(West Germany) Bose HiFi Racing Team	(West Germany) Peter Kroeber	Derichs D37/F3-78-04	Toyota	All
(West Germany) Dietmar Flöer	(West Germany) Dietmar Flöer	March 712M/7	BMW	4
(France) Ecurie Elf	(France) Richard Dallest	Martini MK27	Toyota	2, 8
(France) Ecurie Motul Nogaro	(France) Philippe Streiff	Martini MK27	Toyota	2, 8
(Sweden) Egert Haglund	(Sweden) Egert Haglund	March 733	Toyota	2, 7
(West Germany) Ernst Maring	(West Germany) Ernst Maring	Maco 379/M024	Toyota	2–8
(Switzerland) Formel Rennsport Club	(Switzerland) Bruno Huber	Argo JM1/006-F3	Toyota	8
(Switzerland) Formel Rennsport Club	(Switzerland) Hanspeter Kaufmann	Chevron B38	Toyota	6–7
(Switzerland) Formel Rennsport Club	(Switzerland) Marcus Simeon	March 783	Toyota	4, 6, 8
(Switzerland) Formel Rennsport Club	(Switzerland) Fridolin Wettstein	Ralt RT1/59	Toyota	5
(Switzerland) Formel Rennsport Club	(Switzerland) Marcel Wettstein	Ralt RT1/59	Toyota	2, 6
(Switzerland) Formel Rennsport Club	(Switzerland) Jo Zeller	March 783/1	Toyota	2, 8
(West Germany) Franz-Josef Kaiser	(West Germany) Franz-Josef Kaiser	Ralt RT1	Toyota	3
(West Germany) Frithjof Erpelding	(West Germany) Frithjof Erpelding	Derichs D37/F3-78-02	Toyota	7
(West Germany) Georg Florescu	(West Germany) Georg Florescu	Chevron	Toyota	2, 4
(West Germany) Gero Fleck	(West Germany) Gero Fleck	Ralt RT1	Toyota	7–8
(Netherlands) Hans Kitsz	(Netherlands) Hans Kitsz	Ralt RT1	Toyota	6
(West Germany) Hans-Jürgen Weber	(West Germany) Hans-Jürgen Weber	GRD	Ford	4
(West Germany) Helmut Bross Racing	(West Germany) Helmut Bross	Chevron B43	Toyota	All
(West Germany) Herbert Rostek	(West Germany) Herbert Rostek	Maco 377/M008	Toyota	3
(West Germany) Jägermeister Racing Team	(West Germany) Dieter Bohnhorst	Maco 376/M011	Toyota	1, 3
(Austria) Jim Beam Team	(Austria) Jo Gartner	Martini MK27	Renault	2, 6–8
(Austria) Jim Beam Team	(West Germany) Willy Weiss	Ralt RT1	Toyota	6
(Switzerland) Jörg Reto	(Switzerland) Jörg Reto	Argo JM1	Toyota	7
(West Germany) Klaus Zimmermann Racing Team	(Austria) Franz Konrad	Chevron B43	Toyota	6–7
(West Germany) Klaus Zimmermann Racing Team	(West Germany) Michael Korten	March 783/29	Toyota	1–3, 5–8
(Austria) Konrad Racing	(Austria) Franz Konrad	Chevron B43	Toyota	3, 8
(West Germany) Kurt Lotterschmid	(West Germany) Kurt Lotterschmid	Ralt RT1	Toyota	7
(West Germany) KWS Motorsport	(West Germany) Bernd Breil	March 753	BMW	4–8
(West Germany) KWS Motorsport	(Austria) Franz Konrad	Chevron B43	Toyota	1–2
(West Germany) KWS Motorsport	(Austria) Karl Schuchnig	Chevron B47	Toyota	2, 5–6
(West Germany) KWS Motorsport	(West Germany) Jürgen Schlich	Chevron B38	Toyota	1–2
(West Germany) KWS Motorsport	(United Kingdom) Alan Smith	Chevron B47/47–79–09	Toyota	2, 5
(Sweden) Leo Andersson	(Sweden) Leo Andersson	Ralt RT1/37	Toyota	5
(Switzerland) Lista Racing Team	(Switzerland) Bruno Eichmann	Argo JM3	BMW	2, 5, 8
(Switzerland) Lista Racing Team	(Switzerland) Jürg Lienhard	March 793	Toyota	2, 8
(Italy) Marlboro Valtellina Racing Team	(Italy) Daniele Albertin	Ralt RT1	Toyota	2, 8
(West Germany) MCS Stuttgart	(West Germany) Reinhold Uhl	March 743/3	BMW	1–2, 4
(Sweden) Meltonian Racing	(Sweden) Bengt Trägardh	Ralt RT1/12	Toyota	6
(West Germany) Peter Cornand	(West Germany) Peter Cornand	Chevron B43	Toyota	2–6, 8
(West Germany) Peter Hoffmann	(West Germany) Peter Hoffmann	Ralt RT1/25	BMW	7
(West Germany) Peter Wicks	(West Germany) Peter Wicks	Chevron B38	Toyota	2–7
(West Germany) Peter Wisskirchen	(West Germany) Peter Wisskirchen	Ralt RT1/137	Toyota	1–5, 7–8
(Netherlands) Racing Team Holland	(Netherlands) Arie Luyendijk	Argo JM3	Toyota	2, 8
(United Kingdom) The RMC Group	(United Kingdom) Kenny Acheson	March 793/13	Toyota	6–7
(Belgium) Roger Heavens Racing	(Netherlands) Michael Bleekemolen	March 793/19	Toyota	2, 6, 8
(Belgium) Roger Heavens Racing	(Belgium) Thierry Boutsen	March 793	Toyota	1–2, 6, 8
(Austria) RT Gätmo Tuning	(West Germany) Michael Baumann	Eufra H18	Toyota	7
(Austria) RT Gätmo Tuning	(Austria) Walter Lechner	March 783	Toyota	All
(Austria) RT Gätmo Tuning	(West Germany) Jürgen Schlich	Chevron B38	Toyota	6–8
(Austria) RT Gätmo Tuning	(West Germany) Willy Weiss	Ralt RT1	Toyota	7–8
(Switzerland) Sauber Racing	(Switzerland) Beat Blatter	Lola T670	Toyota	8
(Switzerland) Sauber Racing	(Switzerland) Max Welti	Lola T670	Toyota	8
(West Germany) Scuderia Avus	(West Germany) Olaf Höhn	Derichs D37/F3-78-03	BMW	2, 4–6
(West Germany) Scuderia Colonia	(West Germany) Willi Hüsgen	Brabham BT28	BMW	1, 4
(Chile) Schick Toyota Chilean Team	(Chile) Eliseo Salazar	Ralt RT3/160	Toyota	6
(Sweden) Strike Ten Racing Team	(Sweden) Slim Borgudd	Ralt RT1/126	Toyota	2, 8
(West Germany) Thomas Holert	(West Germany) Thomas Holert	Maco 378/M017	Toyota	All
(Sweden) Thorbjörn Carlsson	(Sweden) Thorbjörn Carlsson	Ralt RT1/110	Toyota	2, 4
(West Germany) Volkswagen Motorsport – Spiess Tuning	(West Germany) Helmut Henzler	March 793	Volkswagen	2, 8
(Austria) Walter Schöch Racing	(Austria) Walter Schöch	Ralt RT1/45	Toyota	4

== Calendar ==
All rounds were held in West Germany, excepting Zolder rounds that were held in Belgium.

Round	Location	Circuit	Date	Supporting
1	Heusden-Zolder, Belgium	Circuit Zolder	11 March	X. AvD/MVBL "Bergischer Löwe"
2	Nürburg, West Germany	Nürburgring	1 April	XIV. ADAC Goodyear 300 km Rennen
3	Fassberg, West Germany	Fassberg Air Base	6 May	ADAC Flugplatzrennen Faßberg
4	Wunstorf, West Germany	Wunstorf Air Base	27 May	ADAC Flugplatz-Rennen Wunstorf
5	Diepholz, West Germany	Diepholz Airfield Circuit	22 July	12. ADAC-Flugplatzrennen Diepholz
6	Heusden-Zolder, Belgium	Circuit Zolder	19 August	13. ADAC-Westfalen-Pokal-Rennen
7	Nürburg, West Germany	Nürburgring	23 September	VI. ADAC-Bilstein-Super-Sprint
8	Kassel-Calden, West Germany	Kassel-Calden Circuit	7 October	ADAC-Hessen-Preis

== Results ==
Round	Circuit	Pole position	Fastest lap	Winning driver	Winning team
1	Circuit Zolder	(West Germany) Michael Korten	(Belgium) Thierry Boutsen	(Belgium) Thierry Boutsen	(Belgium) Roger Heavens Racing
2	Nürburgring	The round was cancelled due to snowfall			
3	Fassberg Air Base	(West Germany) Hans-Georg Bürger	no data	(West Germany) Michael Korten	(West Germany) Klaus Zimmermann Racing Team
4	Wunstorf Air Base	no data	no data	(West Germany) Ernst Maring	(West Germany) Ernst Maring
5	Diepholz Airfield Circuit	(West Germany) Hans-Georg Bürger	no data	(West Germany) Hans-Georg Bürger	(West Germany) Bertram Schäfer Racing
6	Circuit Zolder	(West Germany) Hans-Georg Bürger	(United Kingdom) Kenny Acheson	(Netherlands) Michael Bleekemolen	(Belgium) Roger Heavens Racing
7	Nürburgring	(West Germany) Michael Korten	no data	(West Germany) Michael Korten	(West Germany) Klaus Zimmermann Racing Team
8	Kassel-Calden Circuit	(Netherlands) Michael Bleekemolen	(West Germany) Helmut Henzler	(West Germany) Michael Korten	(West Germany) Klaus Zimmermann Racing Team

== Championship standings ==
- Points are awarded as follows:

1	2	3	4	5	6	7	8	9	10
20	15	12	10	8	6	4	3	2	1

Pos	Driver	ZOL1	NÜR1	FAS	WUN	DIE	ZOL2	NÜR2	KAS	Points
1	(West Germany) Michael Korten	**2**	C	1		3	6	**1**	1	105
2	(West Germany) Hans-Georg Bürger	3	C	**4**		**1**	**2**	6	Ret	73
3	(Austria) Walter Lechner	7	C	2	3	11	4	8	8	62
4	(West Germany) Ernst Maring		C	9	1	7	8	13	6	53
5	(West Germany) Helmut Bross	8	C	3	2	10	9	5	Ret	51
6	(West Germany) Georg Bellof	5	C	Ret		5	Ret	3	14	38
7	(Austria) Franz Konrad	6	C	DNS			3	7	7	38
8	(West Germany) Peter Kroeber	4	C	10	12	4	Ret	Ret	DNS	25
9	(West Germany) Thomas Holert	15	C	6	7	9	14	14	13	24
10	(West Germany) Andy Wietzke	DNS	C	5	6	Ret	12	Ret		20
11	(West Germany) Peter Wisskirchen	10	C	7	5	Ret		12	Ret	17
12	(West Germany) Jürgen Schlich	Ret	C				13	4	Ret	15
13	(West Germany) Helmut Henzler		C						10	8
14	(West Germany) Harald Brutschin								12	6
15	(West Germany) Peter Cornand		C	8	Ret	13	Ret		16	6
16	(West Germany) Peter Wicks		C	Ret	9	Ret	Ret	11		5
17	(Austria) Walter Schöch				8					4
18	(West Germany) Heinrich Heintz	11	C		10		16	Ret		4
19	(West Germany) Konrad Heberer	9	C							3
20	(West Germany) Bernd Wicks		C	Ret		Ret	Ret	10		3
21	(West Germany) Uwe Reich					12				2
22	(West Germany) Willi Husgen	DNS			11					1
	(West Germany) Herbert Rostek			11						0
	(West Germany) Reinhold Uhl	12	C		Ret					0
	(West Germany) Peter Bonk	13						Ret		0
	(West Germany) Hans-Jürgen Weber				13					0
	(West Germany) Dieter Bohnhorst	14		Ret						0
	(West Germany) Bernd Breil				Ret	Ret	Ret	Ret	DNS	0
	(West Germany) Franz-Josef Kaiser			Ret						0
	(West Germany) Georg Florescu		C		Ret					0
	(West Germany) Dietmar Flöer				Ret					0
	(West Germany) Olaf Höhn		C		Ret	Ret	Ret			0
	(West Germany) Bernd Heuer				Ret					0
guest drivers ineligible to score points
	(Netherlands) Michael Bleekemolen		C				1		**9**	0
	(Belgium) Thierry Boutsen	1	C				Ret		Ret	0
	(Sweden) Slim Borgudd		C						2	0
	(United Kingdom) Kenny Acheson						3	2		0
	(United Kingdom) Alan Smith		C			2				0
	(Italy) Daniele Albertin		C						3	0
	(Austria) Jo Gartner		C				15	Ret	4	0
	(Sweden) Thorbjörn Carlsson		C		4					0
	(Switzerland) Jürg Lienhard		C						5	0
	(Switzerland) Fridolin Wettstein					6				0
	(Netherlands) Hans Kitsz						7			0
	(Sweden) Leo Andersson					8				0
	(Switzerland) Hanspeter Kaufmann						Ret	9		0
	(Switzerland) Marcel Wettstein		C				10			0
	(Austria) Karl Schuchnig		C			Ret	11			0
	(Switzerland) Jo Zeller		C						11	0
	(West Germany) Kurt Lotterschmid							15		0
	(Switzerland) Urs Dudler								15	0
	(Switzerland) Jörg Reto							16		0
	(Switzerland) Marcus Simeon				Ret		Ret		DNQ	0
	(Switzerland) Bruno Eichmann		C			Ret			Ret	0
	(West Germany) Willy Weiss						Ret	Ret	Ret	0
	(West Germany) Gero Fleck							Ret	DNS	0
	(Netherlands) Arie Luyendijk		C						Ret	0
	(Chile) Eliseo Salazar						Ret			0
	(Sweden) Bengt Trägardh						Ret			0
	(West Germany) Hannelore Werner							Ret		0
	(West Germany) Frithjof Erpelding							Ret		0
	(West Germany) Peter Hoffmann							Ret		0
	(West Germany) Michael Baumann							Ret		0
	(Sweden) Egert Haglund		C					Ret		0
	(France) Richard Dallest		C						Ret	0
	(France) Philippe Streiff		C						Ret	0
	(Switzerland) Max Welti								Ret	0
	(Switzerland) Bruno Huber								Ret	0
	(Switzerland) Beat Blatter								Ret	0
	(Switzerland) Armin Conrad								Ret	0
	(Switzerland) Jean-Yves Simeni								DNQ	0
	(Sweden) Tryggve Grönvall		C						DNQ	0
Pos	Driver	ZOL1	NÜR1	FAS	WUN	DIE	ZOL2	NÜR2	KAS	Points

Colour	Result
Gold	Winner
Silver	Second place
Bronze	Third place
Green	Points classification
Blue	Non-points classification
Blue	Non-classified finish (NC)
Purple	Retired, not classified (Ret)
Red	Did not qualify (DNQ)
Red	Did not pre-qualify (DNPQ)
Black	Disqualified (DSQ)
White	Did not start (DNS)
White	Withdrew (WD)
White	Race cancelled (C)
Blank	Did not practice (DNP)
Blank	Did not arrive (DNA)
Blank	Excluded (EX)

**Bold** – Pole
Italics – Fastest Lap
