= 1974 ADAC Preis der Formel 3 =

1974 German Formula Three Championship

Seasons
- ← 1973 1975 →

The 1974 ADAC Preis der Formel 3 was a multi-event motor racing championship for single-seat open wheel formula racing cars held in Germany and Austria. The championship featured drivers with an ONS licence, competing in two-litre Formula Three racing cars which conformed to the technical regulations, or formula, for the championship. It commenced on 5 May at Neubiberg and ended at Nürburgring on 8 September after ten rounds.

Willi Deutsch was the champion, winning four races and 137 points. Dieter Kern finished as runner-up, winning four races and scoring 135 points.

Within the same ten stages (withe the exception of the Freiburg stage, with was replaced by a race at Avus), and with the same classification in each race, another championship took place, with a different scoring system, called Polifac Formel 3 Trophy, for drivers holding an international licence. It was won by Italian driver Giogio Francia.

== Calendar ==
All rounds were held in West Germany, excepting Salzburg round which were held in Austria.

Round	Location	Circuit	Date	Supporting
1	Munich, West Germany	Neubiberg Air Base	5 May	7. ADAC-Flugplatzrennen München-Neubiberg
2	Nürburg, West Germany	Nürburgring	18 May	XX. ADAC 1000 km Rennen
3	Salzburg, Austria	Salzburgring	26 May	ADAC-Bavaria-Rennen
4	Wunstorf, West Germany	Wunstorf Air Base	9 June	ADAC Flugplatz-Rennen Wunstorf
5	Nürburg, West Germany	Nürburgring	16 June	IX. ADAC-300-km-Rennen um den "Good Year-Pokal"
6	Hockenheim, West Germany	Hockenheimring	14 July	ADAC-Südwestpokal-Rennen
7	Freiburg im Breisgau, West Germany	Freiburg im Breisgau	28 July	ADAC-Bergpreis Freiburg-Schauinsland
8	Kassel-Calden, West Germany	Kassel-Calden Circuit	18 August	ADAC-Hessen-Preis
9	Mainz, West Germany	Mainz-Finthen Airport	1 September	8. Rheinhessisches ADAC-Flugplatzrennen Mainz-Finthen
10	Nürburg, West Germany	Nürburgring	7 September	ADAC-Redlefsen-Super-Sprint

== Championship standings ==
- Points are awarded as follows:

1	2	3	4	5	6	7	8	9	10
20	15	12	10	8	6	4	3	2	1

Pos	Driver	NEU	NÜR1	SAL	WUN	NÜR2	HOC	FRE	KAS	MAI	NÜR3	Points
1	(West Germany) Willi Deutsch		2	1	2	1	5	2	1	1	3	137
2	(West Germany) Dieter Kern	1	1	4	1		1	1	2		4	135
3	(West Germany) Ernst Maring	3			3		3	6		2	2	72
4	(West Germany) Rudolf Dötsch	2				3		4	4	6	6	59
5	(Austria) Harald Ertl					2			3	4	1	57
6	(West Germany) Heinz Lange		3				2	8	7	3	5	54
7	(West Germany) Hans Hargarten		8	2	4		8		6	5	7	49
8	(West Germany) Manfred Leppke		4	6	10	4	6					33
9	(West Germany) Josef Kremer	8	6	3	7	6						31
10	(West Germany) Bernhard Brack	6					4		5	8		27
11	(West Germany) Werner Fischer	5	5					5				24
12	(West Germany) Ingo Hopp		7	7	6	9	9	10	10			20
13	(West Germany) Walter Neubauer	4	10		8	8						17
14	(West Germany) Erwin Derichs					5		7		9		17
15	(West Germany) Kurt Pfunder							3				12
16	(United States) Steve Farnsworth				5				8			11
17	(West Germany) Günter Kölmel		9			7	7			10		11
18	(West Germany) Franz Baumann			5								8
19	(West Germany) Bernd Heuer	7					10					5
20	(West Germany) Gernot Lamby									7		4
21	(West Germany) Horst Floth	9										2
22	(West Germany) Carlo Breidenstein				9							2
23	(West Germany) Gerhard Greiner							9				2
24	(West Germany) Erhard Miltz								9			2
25	(West Germany) Dietmar Floer	10										1
26	(West Germany) Günter Holker					10						1
Pos	Driver	NEU	NÜR1	SAL	WUN	NÜR2	HOC	FRE	KAS	MAI	NÜR3	Points

Colour	Result
Gold	Winner
Silver	Second place
Bronze	Third place
Green	Points classification
Blue	Non-points classification
Blue	Non-classified finish (NC)
Purple	Retired, not classified (Ret)
Red	Did not qualify (DNQ)
Red	Did not pre-qualify (DNPQ)
Black	Disqualified (DSQ)
White	Did not start (DNS)
White	Withdrew (WD)
White	Race cancelled (C)
Blank	Did not practice (DNP)
Blank	Did not arrive (DNA)
Blank	Excluded (EX)

**Bold** – Pole
Italics – Fastest Lap
