= 1973 ADAC Preis der Formel 3 =

Multi-event motor racing championship in 1973

1973 German Formula Three Championship

Seasons
- ← 1972 1974 →

The 1973 ADAC Preis der Formel 3 was a multi-event motor racing championship for single-seat open wheel formula racing cars held across Europe. The championship featured drivers competing in two-litre Formula Three racing cars which conformed to the technical regulations, or formula, for the championship. It commenced on 1 April at Nürburgring and ended at Mainz-Finthen on 9 September after five rounds.

Willi Deutsch became a champion. He won three races. Dieter Kern finished as runner-up. Thomas Betzler completed the top-three in the drivers' standings.

The scoring system for the Zolder stage was slightly different, with 15 points awarded to the winner Willi Deutsch, instead of 20 points.

== Calendar ==
All rounds were held in West Germany, excepting Zolder round which held in Belgium.

Round	Location	Circuit	Date	Supporting
1	Nürburg, West Germany	Nürburgring	1 April	VIII. ADAC 300 km Rennen um den "Good Year-Pokal"
2	Hockenheim, West Germany	Hockenheimring	15 July	ADAC-Südwestpokal-Rennen
3	Kassel-Calden, West Germany	Kassel-Calden Circuit	19 August	ADAC-Hessen-Preis
4	Zolder, Belgium	Circuit Zolder	26 August	7. ADAC-Westfalen-Pokal Rennen
5	Mainz, West Germany	Mainz-Finthen Airport	9 September	7. Rheinhessisches ADAC-Flugplatzrennen Mainz-Finthen

== Championship standings ==
- Points are awarded as follows:

1	2	3	4	5	6	7	8	9	10
20	15	12	10	8	6	4	3	2	1

Pos	Driver	NÜR	HOC	KAS	ZOL	MAI	Points
1	(West Germany) Willi Deutsch		1	1	1	1	75
2	(West Germany) Dieter Kern		2	2	5	2	53
3	(West Germany) Thomas Betzler	1		4			30
4	(West Germany) Sigi Hofmann	7	5	6	4		28
5	(West Germany) Erwin Derichs	6		5	7	8	21
6	(West Germany) Rudolf Dötsch	5	3				20
7	(West Germany) Günter Kölmel	8	4			7	17
8	(West Germany) Werner Schommers	2					15
9	(West Germany) Bernd Heuer		9	8		5	13
10	(West Germany) Heinz Lange					3	12
11	(West Germany) Josef Kremer			10		4	11
12	(West Germany) Erhard Miltz			9		6	8
13	(West Germany) Walter Neubauer		10		6		7
14	(West Germany) Gernot Lamby		6				6
15	(West Germany) Bernhard Brack			7			4
16	(West Germany) Willi Sommer		8				3
17	(Austria) Harald Ertl	9					2
18	(West Germany) Carlo Breidenstein	10					1
	(West Germany) Wolfgang Bülow	3		3	3		0
	(West Germany) Ernst Maring	4	7				0
Pos	Driver	NÜR	HOC	KAS	ZOL	MAI	Points

Colour	Result
Gold	Winner
Silver	Second place
Bronze	Third place
Green	Points classification
Blue	Non-points classification
Blue	Non-classified finish (NC)
Purple	Retired, not classified (Ret)
Red	Did not qualify (DNQ)
Red	Did not pre-qualify (DNPQ)
Black	Disqualified (DSQ)
White	Did not start (DNS)
White	Withdrew (WD)
White	Race cancelled (C)
Blank	Did not practice (DNP)
Blank	Did not arrive (DNA)
Blank	Excluded (EX)

**Bold** – Pole
Italics – Fastest Lap
