= Werner Klein =

German entrepreneur

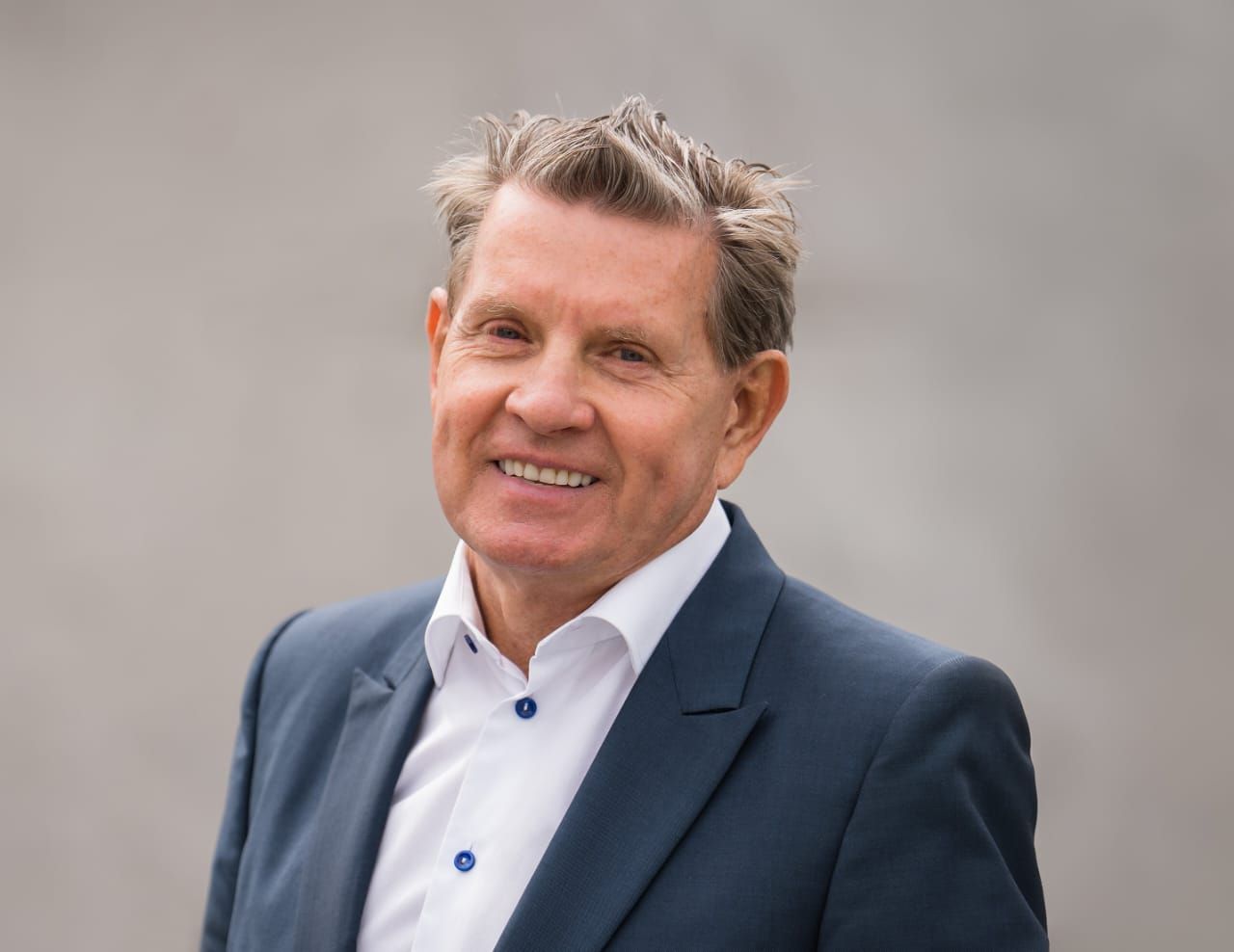
Werner Klein (2022)

Werner Klein (born 25 January 1950 in Burbach (Saarbrücken) is a German entrepreneur, investor and former racing driver residing in Switzerland.

== Biography ==
After graduating as a merchant in wholesale and foreign trade, Klein took over his parents' beverage wholesale Klein Getränke GmbH in Saarbrücken and founded the alldrink Getränkefachmarktkette (alldrink chain of warehouse stores for beverages). Due to changes in trade, he established a system-controlled logistics center for beverages in Neunkirchen/Saar in 1995.

At the end of 2002, Klein relocated to Switzerland and founded ProCon Invest AG (real estate and investments). In 2014, Klein bought the business premises of C&A in Ulm. In 2019, the foundation of ProCon Real Estate GbR, a family office, took place. The family office acquired in 2019 a premium property in the city center of Freiburg im Breisgau. Klein's real estate investments became known through transactions in inner-city prime locations.

== Entrepreneurial participations ==
- ProCon Invest AG: Board of directors
- ProCon Real Estate GbR: Chief Representative

== Personal life ==
Klein has two children, son Marc Klein and daughter Linda Klein, has been married since May 2024 and lives with his wife Christine in Lucerne on Lake Lucerne.
