= Peter Scharmann =

Austrian race car driver

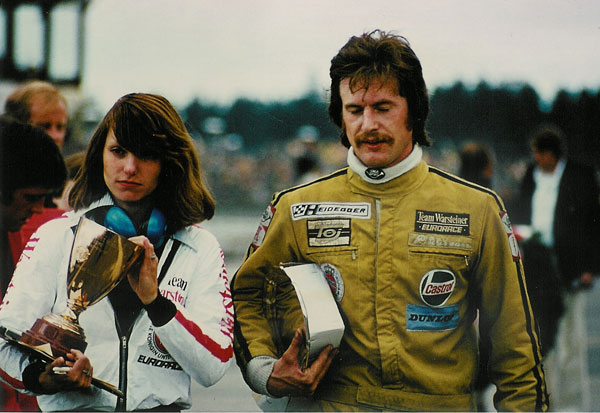
Peter Scharmann (Nürburgring, 1976).

Peter Scharmann (born 26 February 1950, in Klagenfurt) is an Austrian racing driver who competed in German and European motor sports in the 1970s in Formula Vee and Formula Super Vee classes, and later in the Formula 3 and Formula 2, with numerous successes.

== Motorsport biography and career ==
Scharmann graduated at the HTL in Klagenfurt, where he was trained as a mechanical engineer. He utilized his training in the years 1970 to 1973, first as a design engineer and later as a chassis engineer at Porsche in Stuttgart, among others, under Ferdinand Piech, who later became chairman of Volkswagen AG.

Just one year after his entry into motorsports in 1972, Scharmann won the 1973 Central European Formula V title in his first self-built cockpit. The experience from his work at Porsche proved to be very helpful.

Other successes included the German Vice Champion in Formula Super V in the years 1974 and 1976. His career was culminated by winning the German Formula 3 Championship title in 1977, the then 27-year-old driver's first year in this class. The championship was won with primary sponsorship from the beer brand Warsteiner and as a member of the racing team Obermoser Jörg. The car was a TOJ F302 race car, a model first introduced its championship year. The team used engines from both Toyota and BMW. He bested such drivers as the future Formula 1 driver Keke Rosberg, who was driving the cars of Jörg Chief Moser TOJ.

Scharmann ended his motorsports career in 1979 as a driver in Formula 2, choosing to devote his time to his professional career and his family. In 1982, he moved back to Klagenfurt and has since worked at the company HOBAS, where he became director in 2000.

Scharmann returned to motorsports after a long break to race in his spare time with his own kart ride on courses in Austria. He is married and the father of two grown children.

Sporting positions
Preceded by Bertram Schäfer	German Formula Three champion 1977	Succeeded by Bertram Schäfer
