= Erding Air Base =

Erding Air Base Fliegerhorst Erding
- IATA: none; ICAO: ETSE

Summary
- Airport type: Military
- Owner: Bundeswehr
- Operator: German Air Force
- Location: Erding, Germany
- Elevation AMSL: 1,515 ft / 462 m
- Coordinates: 48°19′21″N 011°56′55″E

Map
- Location of Erding Air Base

Runways
Direction	Length		Surface
Direction	m	ft	Surface
08/26	2,521	8,271	Asphalt

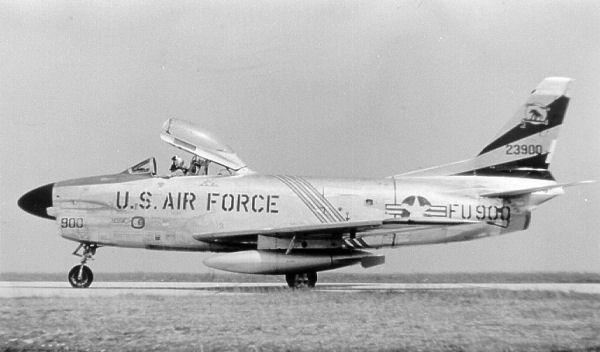
North American F-86D-45-NA Sabre Serial 52-3900 of the 440th Fighter-Interceptor Squadron, Erding Air Base, 1956

Erding Air Base (German: Fliegerhorst Erding, ICAO: ETSE) is a German Air Force airfield near the town of Erding, about 45 kilometers (28 mi) northeast of central Munich in Bavaria. It is the home of the 5th Air Defense Missile Squadron and the 1st Air Force Maintenance Regiment.

The last public airshow at Erding was held during the summer of 1986.

== History ==
Prior to and during World War II, Erding was a Luftwaffe pilot training airfield. It was seized by the United States Army in April 1945 and used by the United States Air Force during the early years of the Cold War. Erding was used as an Air Depot, Air Base and an Air Station.

USAF units stationed at Erding were:

- 85th Air Depot Wing, 1 Jun 1945

Redesignated: European Air Depot, 1 Sep 1945
Redesignated: Erding Air Depot, 5 Nov 1946
Redesignated: 7200th Air Force Depot Wing, 1 Jul 1948
Redesignated: 85th Air Depot Wing, 25 Jul 1949 85 ADW was transferred to Twelfth Air Force on 21 January 1951. On 10 July 1952, 85 ADW and its supporting units were reassigned from Twelfth Air Force to HEADQUARTERS, USAFE.
Redesignated: 7485th Air Depot Wing, 1 Dec 1953
Redesignated: 7485th Support Wing (Training), 1 Apr 1956 – 15 May 1958

- 440th Fighter-Interceptor Squadron, 17 Feb 1956 – 1 Jan 1960
- 52d Tactical Fighter Group, 1 Apr 1971 – 31 Jul 1972

Originally developed as an Air Depot in the early postwar years, the mission of Erding Air Base (later Station) was to provide depot-level maintenance of USAFE and NATO fighters. With the opening of Châteauroux-Déols Air Base, France in 1953, Erding became a satellite depot.

The mission of Erding Air Base was changed in 1956 to training personnel for the newly reconstituted German Air Force (GAF). The base was turned over to the GAF on 1 April 1957. On 14 December 1957, control of Erding Air Base was returned to the GAF as a front line facility where it hosted various F-104 Starfighter, Panavia Tornado and other fighter squadrons.

With the creation of NATO in response to Cold War tensions in Europe, USAFE wanted its major air bases in West Germany moved west of the Rhine River to provide greater air defense warning time. The establishment of the new bases in the Rhineland-Palatinate diminished the USAF use of Erding. It became an air defense facility in 1956 with the assignment of the F-86D equipped 440th Fighter-Interceptor Squadron, a detachment of the 86th Fighter-Interceptor Wing at Landstuhl Air Base until the arrival of the Convair F-102 Delta Dagger in Europe and budget cutbacks in 1960 forced its closure.

In 1966 with France withdrawing from NATO it left a gap in the air defense network of Europe. Operation Creek Ale filled that gap by rotating F-102 interceptors from various squadrons of the 86th Air Division based at Ramstein Air Base. Squadrons from Soesterberg Air Base, Zaragoza Air Base, Hahn Air Base, Bitburg Air Base and Ramstein Air Base rotated to Erding for air defense alert.

With the inactivation of the 86th Air Division in 1970, the 52d Tactical Fighter Group was formed at Erding in 1971 with some of the F-102s on a permanent basis. In 1972 the F-102s were withdrawn from Europe and the 52d TFG was inactivated.

Relegated to Air Station status, Erding hosted temporary duty units of North America-based USAF aircraft through the 1980s for short-term deployments as part of the annual Exercise Reforger.

From 2002 to 2013, the base was home to the GAF's 1st Air Force Maintenance Regiment. It is now the location of Weapon System Support Center 1.

== Erding Air Base Circuit ==
Erding Air Base Circuit
- Full Circuit (1980)
- Location: Erding, Bavaria
- Opened: 1 October 1978; 47 years ago
- Closed: 6 July 1986; 40 years ago
- Major events: Interserie (1984–1985); DPM (1985); German F3 (1978, 1980–1986)

Full Circuit (1981–1986)
- Length: 2.540 km (1.578 mi)
- Turns: 9
- Race lap record: 0:52.830 ( (West Germany) Hans-Joachim Stuck, Porsche 956B, 1985, Group C)

Full Circuit (1979–1980)
- Length: 2.540 km (1.578 mi)
- Turns: 12
- Race lap record: 1:01.800 ( (Switzerland) Bruno Eichmann, Argo JM3, 1979, F3)

Full Circuit (1978)
- Length: 2.540 km (1.578 mi)
- Turns: 10

From 1978 to 1986, the aerodrome hosted some car races, such as Interserie, Deutschen Produktionswagen Meisterschaft and German Formula Three Championship championships.

=== Lap records ===
The fastest official race lap records at the Erding Air Base circuit are listed as:

Category	Time	Driver	Vehicle	Event
Full Circuit (1981–1986): 2.540 km (1.578 mi)
Group C	0:52.830	Hans-Joachim Stuck	Porsche 956B	1985 Erding Interserie round
Formula Two	0:53.670	Udo Wagenhäuser	Spirit 201 BMW	1985 Erding Interserie round
Formula Three	0:56.070	Kris Nissen	Ralt RT30	1985 Erding German F3 round
Group B	0:59.210	Kurt König	BMW M1	1982 ADAC Flugplatzrennen Erding GT race
Group A	1:04.790	Peggen Andersson	Volvo 240 Turbo	1985 Erding DPM round
Full Circuit (1979–1980): 2.540 km (1.578 mi)
Formula Three	1:01.800	Bruno Eichmann	Argo JM3	1979 ADAC Flugplatzrennen Erding Formula 3 race
Full Circuit (1978): 2.540 km (1.578 mi)
