= Jochen Dauer =

German racing driver

Jochen Dauer (born 10 January 1952) is a German former racing driver and founder of Dauer Sportwagen. In the beginning of 2010, Dauer was in detention of a suspect in Nuremberg because of tax evasion. On 27 July 2010 it was announced, that he had to go to prison for 42 months.
