= Wunstorf Air Base =

German military air base

Wunstorf Air Base RAF Wunstorf Advanced Landing Ground (ALG) B-116

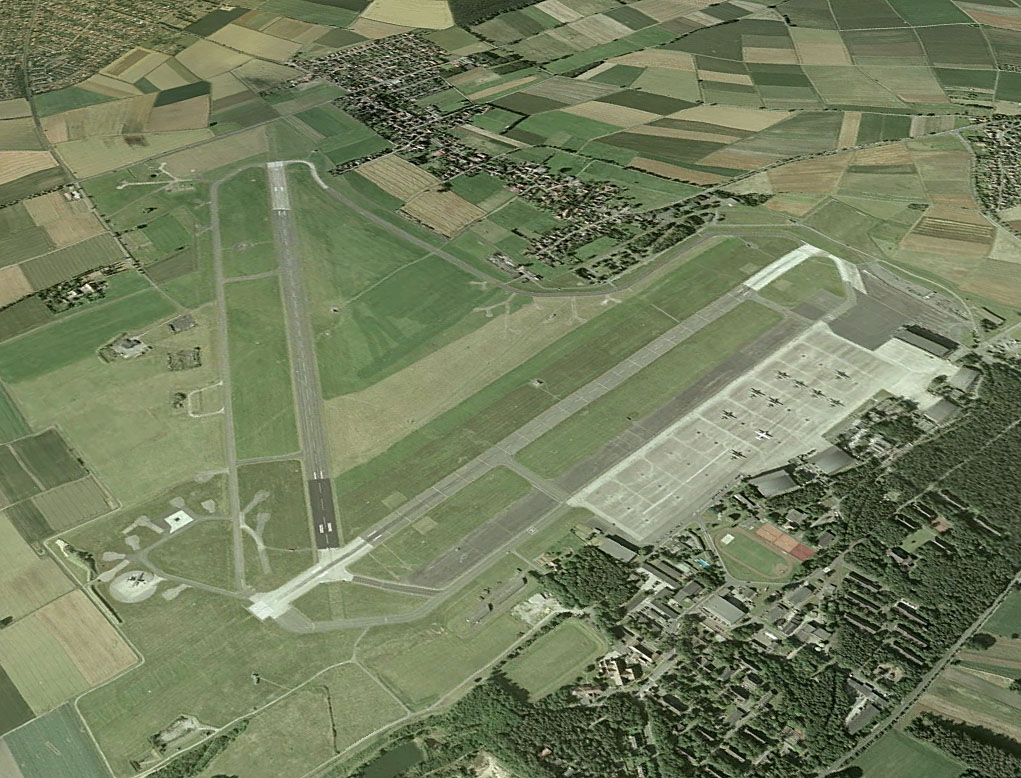
- Aerial picture prior to 2010's expansion

Site information
- Owner: Federal Defence Forces of Germany
- Operator: Luftwaffe (National Socialist), 1936–1945; Royal Air Force, 1945–1957; German Air Force (FRG), 1957–present

Location
- Shown within Lower Saxony, Germany
- Coordinates: 52.45472°N 9.42889°E

Site history
- Built: 1936
- In use: 1936–present

Garrison information
- Garrison: Air Transport Wing 62

Airfield information
- Identifiers: ICAO: ETNW
Runways
Direction	Length and surface
03/21	1,699 m (5,574 ft) Asphalt
08/26	2,499 m (8,199 ft) Concrete

Wunstorf Air Base is a German Air Force military airfield (air base), located 6 kilometres (3.7 mi) south-southwest of Neustadt am Rübenberge and 4 kilometres (2.5 mi) north-northwest of Wunstorf in Lower Saxony, Germany. Wunstorf Air Base is the home to Air Transport Wing 62 (Lufttransportgeschwader 62), a unit operating all German Airbus A400M Atlas.

== History ==
The airfield was opened in 1936 for the German Luftwaffe reconstituted by the National Socialist government in 1935. During the Second World War, it was seized by the British Army on 7 April 1945, in a fierce battle by elements of the 5th Parachute Brigade, 6th Airborne Division. During the battle, in which the 13th Battalion was also engaged, the 7th (Light Infantry) Parachute Battalion lost six killed, and 21 wounded, most from the initial ambush of the four leading trucks of B Company. The airfield was captured with 19 Bf 109s, four Fw 190s, two Ju 88s, two Ju 52s and much other valuable equipment.

After the battle, the base was taken over by the Royal Air Force (RAF), including Canadian (RCAF) Wing 126 of the British 2nd Tactical Air Force, and designated as Advanced Landing Ground B-116 Wunstorf.

The airfield features heavily in the book 13 - Lucky For Some, which is about the history of the 13th (Lancashire) Parachute Battalion. There are many then and now photographs as well as maps and diagrams of battles that took place in the region.

It was later designated RAF Wunstorf and used by Royal Air Force Germany. RAF units assigned were:

- April 1947 - June 1950: 2 Sq with Spitfire F 14/PR 19
- 1950-1952: 4 Sq, 26 Sq with Vampire FB 5 later FB9
- August 1950 - September 1955: 11 Sq with Vampire FB 5, later Venom FB 1, later FB 4
- March 1952 - October 1955: 5 Sq with Vampire FB 5, later Venom FB 1, later FB 4
- July 1952 - October 1955: 266 Sq with Vampire FB 5, later Venom FB 1, later FB 4
- November 1955 - September 1956: 79 Sq with Meteor FR 9 and Swift FR 5
- November 1955 - September 1957: 541 Sq with Meteor PR 10
- 1956-1957: 5 Sq, 11 Sq, 266 Sq with Venom FB 4

Much of the 1951 novel Air Bridge by Hammond Innes is set in RAF Wunstorf at the time of the Berlin Airlift. The novel contains descriptions of how the airfield, rapidly expanded for the Airlift, looked at that time.

The then-RAF Wunstorf also featured in the 1957 film "High Flight". Also in 1957, the airfield returned to the control of the German Air Force and became a NATO air base.

The airfield participated in Air Defender 23, the largest exercise of air forces in the history of NATO, held 12–23 June 2023 under the leadership of the German Air Force.

== Use by German Air Force ==
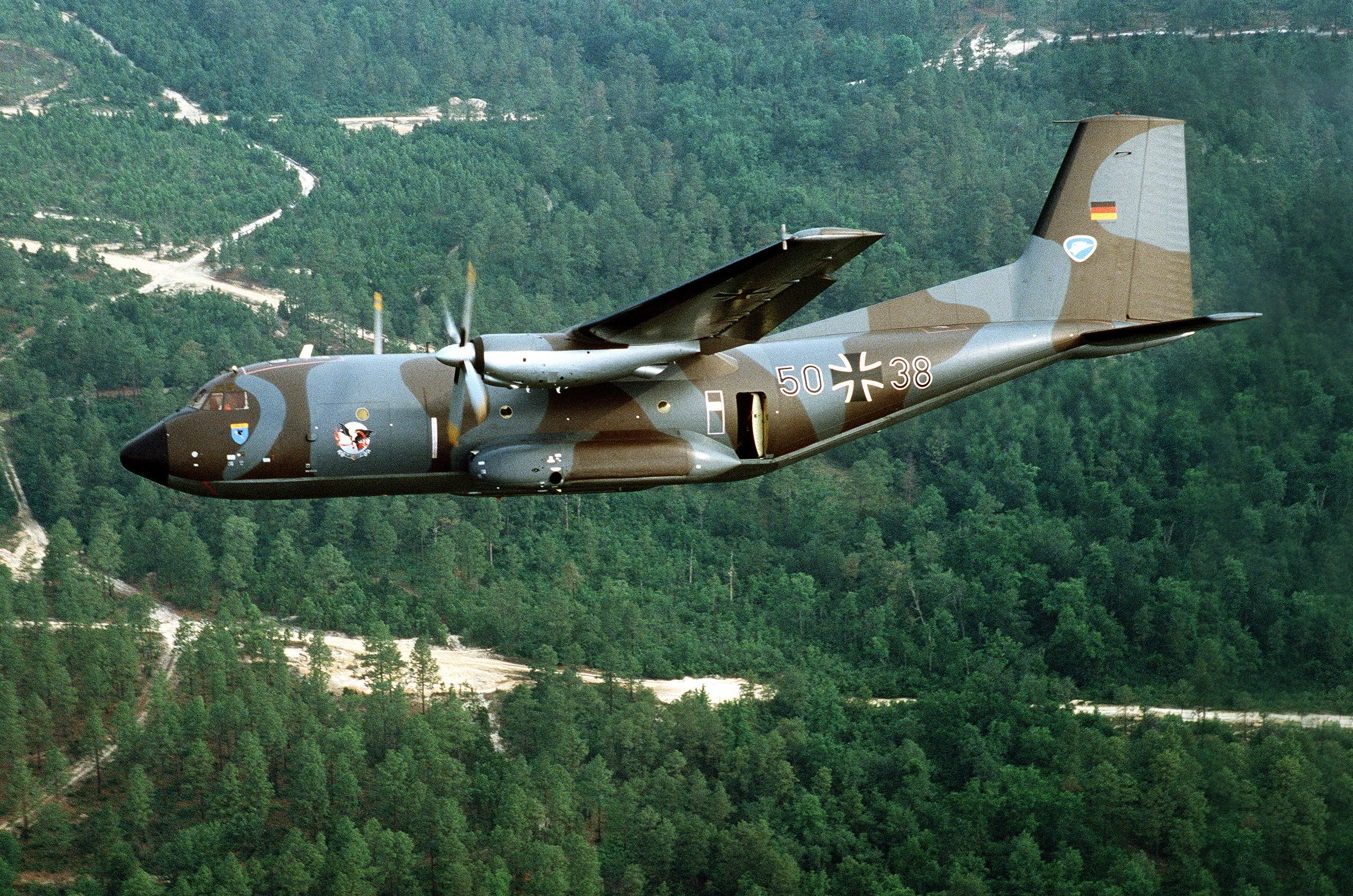
A German Air Force Transall C-160D transport aircraft (s/n 50+38) of Air Transport Wing 62 (LTG 62) based at Wunstorf Air Base, in flight on 15 June 1983

German Air Force first stationed Nord Noratlas which by 1971 were replaced by Transall C-160D; those were disbanded from the local Air Transport Wing 62 (LTG 62) in July 2015, now focussing on accepting and integrating Airbus A400M Atlas. Flight training for decades was executed using Dornier Do 28.

== Expansion in 2010s ==
As preparation for 40 Airbus A400M Atlas to be stationed at Wunstorf Air Base, the airbase underwent major expansion. Runway 08/26 (45 metres or 148 feet wide) was lengthened from 1,877 to 2,499 metres (6,158 to 8,199 ft) mainly to the east. Parking positions were expanded, one maintenance hangar was erected, another one is under construction. A building to house the flight simulator has been added.

== Motorsport ==
Wunstorf Air Base Circuit
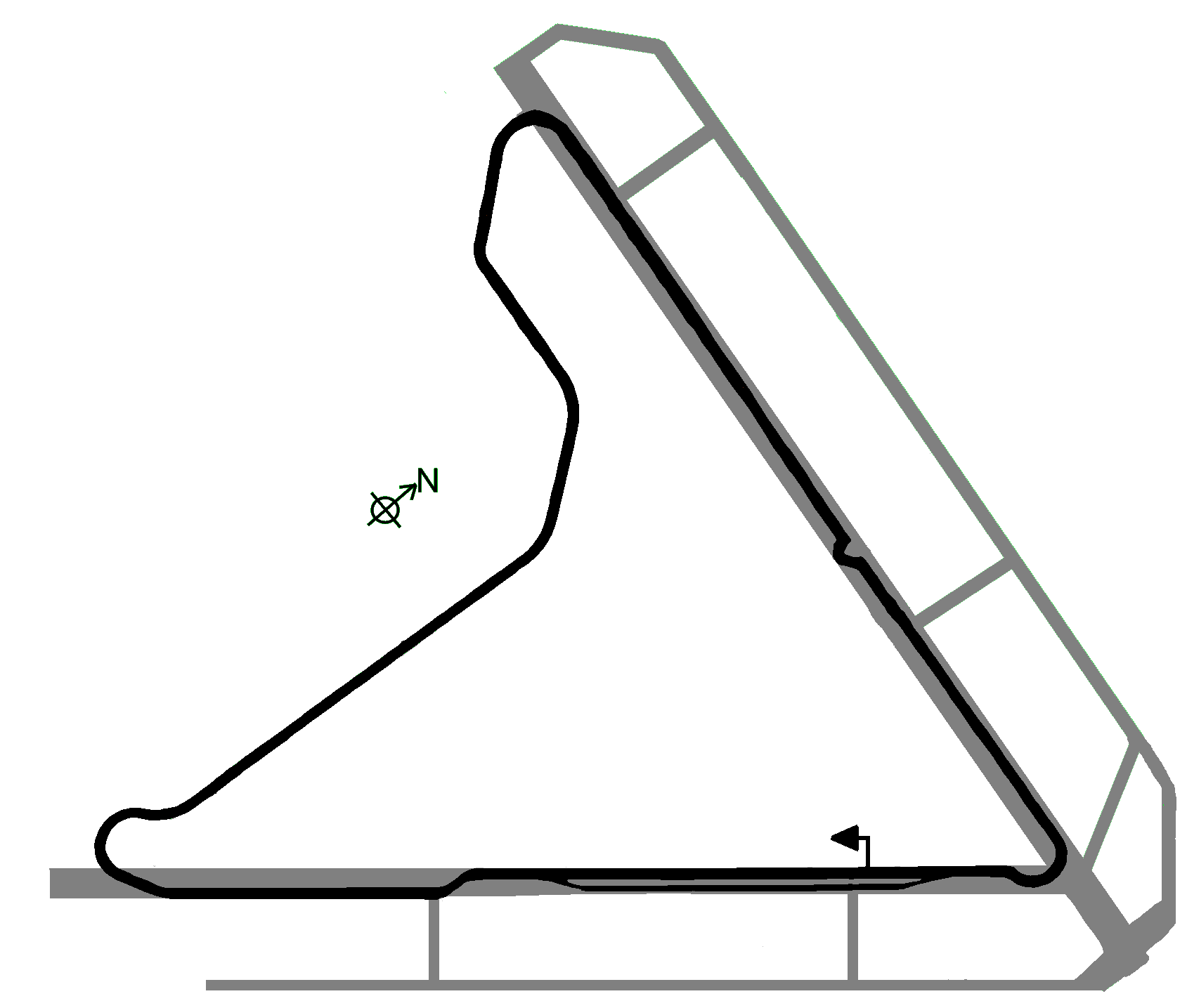
- Full Circuit (1982–1998)
- Location: Wunstorf, Lower Saxony
- Opened: 30 August 1964; 61 years ago
- Closed: 2 August 1998; 28 years ago
- Major events: STW (1994, 1996–1998); German F3 (1974–1979, 1981–1986, 1988–1994, 1997–1998); DTM (1984–1988, 1990–1993); Interserie (1977–1979, 1985–1990); DRM (1981–1982, 1985)

Full Circuit (1982–1998)
- Length: 5.047 km (3.136 mi)
- Turns: 13
- Race lap record: 1:30.750 ( (Denmark) Kris Nissen, Porsche 962C, 1988, Group C)

Full Circuit (1981)
- Length: 5.047 km (3.136 mi)
- Turns: 12
- Race lap record: 1:43.580 ( (West Germany) Manfred Winkelhock, Ford Capri III Turbo, 1981, Group 5)

Full Circuit (1978–1980)
- Length: 3.348 km (2.080 mi)
- Turns: 13
- Race lap record: 1:17.500 ( (West Germany) Jochen Dauer, Chevron B43, 1978, F3)

Full Circuit (1976–1977)
- Length: 3.849 km (2.392 mi)
- Turns: 16
- Race lap record: 1:25.300 ( (West Germany) Helmut Bross, Lola T294, 1977, Group 5)

Full Circuit (1975)
- Length: 3.500 km (2.175 mi)
- Turns: 13

Full Circuit (1965–1974)
- Length: 5.099 km (3.168 mi)
- Turns: 17
- Race lap record: 1:49.000 ( (West Germany) Kurt Ahrens Jr., Porsche 908, 1969, Group 6)

Full Circuit (1964)
- Length: 3.799 km (2.361 mi)

Between 1964 and 1998, a temporary motor racing circuit was laid out on the Wunstorf airbase. It hosted the Interserie sports car racing championship between 1977 and 1979, and again between 1985 and 1990. The German Touring Car Championship competed at Wunstorf between 1984 and 1993, one of several temporary airfield tracks on the DTM calendar at the time. The series eventually began to move towards permanent racing facilities and the final DTM race at Wunstorf took place in 1993. The Super Tourenwagen Cup raced at the venue in 1994 and from 1996 to 1998.

Besides the big-name national championships, Wunstorf hosted a series of annual club racing meetings until 1999, when motor racing on the airbase premises was finally halted due to the cost of preparation and administration for the events.

=== Lap records ===
The fastest official race lap records at the Wunstorf Air Base Circuit are listed as:

Category	Time	Driver	Vehicle	Event
Full Circuit (1982–1998): 5.047 km (3.136 mi)
Group C	1:30.750	Kris Nissen	Porsche 962C	1988 Wunstorf Interserie round
Formula Three	1:38.494	Steffen Widmann	Dallara F397	1998 Wunstorf German F3 round
Class 1 Touring Cars	1:44.620	Nicola Larini	Alfa Romeo 155 V6 TI	1993 Wunstorf DTM round
Super Touring	1:45.653	Laurent Aïello	Peugeot 406	1997 Wunstorf STW Cup round
Group A	1:46.150	Keke Rosberg	Mercedes 190E 2.5-16 Evo2	1992 Wunstorf DTM round
Full Circuit (1981): 5.047 km (3.136 mi)
Group 5	1:43.580	Manfred Winkelhock	Ford Capri III Turbo	1981 Wunstorf DRM round
Formula Three	1:49.210	Stefan Bellof	Ralt RT3	1981 Wunstorf German F3 round
Full Circuit (1978–1980): 3.348 km (2.080 mi)
Formula Three	1:17.500	Jochen Dauer	Chevron B43	1978 Wunstorf German F3 round
Full Circuit (1976–1977): 3.849 km (2.392 mi)
Group 5	1:25.300	Helmut Bross	Lola T294	1977 Wunstorf Interserie round
Full Circuit (1975): 3.500 km (2.175 mi)
Full Circuit (1965–1974): 5.099 km (3.168 mi)
Group 6	1:49.000	Kurt Ahrens Jr.	Porsche 908	1969 Internationales Flugplatzrennen Wunstorf
Formula Three	1:52.500	Fabrizio Noé	Lotus 69	1971 ADAC Flugplatzrennen Wunstorf Formula 3 race
Group 4	2:02.700	Hans-Heinrich Timm	Porsche 914-6 GT	1971 ADAC Flugplatzrennen Wunstorf GT race
Full Circuit (1964): 3.799 km (2.361 mi)

== Bibliography ==
- World Aero Data Wunstorf
- Military Airfield Directory Wunstorf Airbase
- Wunstorf and Neustadt April 1945
- Innes, Hammond, Air Bridge, (London, 1951)
- Jefford, C.G. (1988). RAF Squadrons. A comprehensive record of the movement and equipment of all RAF squadrons and their antecedents since 1912. Shrewsbury: Airlife. ISBN 1-85310-053-6.
- Johnson, David C. (1988), U.S. Army Air Forces Continental Airfields (ETO), D-Day to V-E Day; Research Division, USAF Historical Research Center, Maxwell AFB, Alabama.
