= Bertram Schäfer =

German racing driver (born 1946)

- Nationality: (Germany) German
- Born: 18 March 1946 (age 80) Bitburg (Germany)

Volkswagen Scirocco R-Cup career
- Car number: 38

Championship titles
- 1976 1978: German Formula Three; German Formula Three

Bertram Schäfer (born 18 March 1946, in Bitburg) is a German racing driver. He won the German Formula Three Championship in 1976 and 1978. He also raced at the Norisring for one round of the Volkswagen Scirocco R-Cup in 2010.

Schafer became the owner of Bertram Schäfer Racing, a successful European F3 Championship team. In 2002, he was one of the judges at Red Bull’s Formula One Driver Search program.

Sporting positions
| Preceded by Ernst Maring | German Formula Three champion 1976 | Succeeded by Peter Scharmann |
| Preceded by Peter Scharmann | German Formula Three champion 1978 | Succeeded by Michael Korten |
