= Kassel-Calden Circuit =

Airfield circuit, Kassel, Germany

- Location: Kassel, Hesse, Germany
- Coordinates: 51°25′15″N 9°23′32″E
- Opened: 22 August 1971; 54 years ago
- Closed: 1987
- Major events: European F3 (1976–1980, 1982); German F3 (1971–1980, 1982); Interserie (1974–1980); Deutsche Rennsport Meisterschaft (1972–1973, 1975–1978)

Full Circuit (1982–1987)
- Length: 2.590 km (1.609 mi)
- Turns: 9
- Race lap record: 1:04.870 ( (Argentina) Oscar Larrauri, Euroracing 101, 1982, F3)

Full Circuit (1971–1981)
- Length: 2.645 km (1.644 mi)
- Turns: 9
- Race lap record: 0:54.800 ( (France) Bob Wollek, Porsche 935/77A, 1978, Group 5)

Kassel-Calden Circuit was a 2.590 km (1.609 mi) former airfield circuit located on the Kassel Airport in Kassel, Hesse, Germany.

The circuit was opened in August 1971 for the venue of ADAC Hessenpreis due to the expensive costs of hiring Hockenheimring for this event. Besides national championships, the circuit also hosted races for some international championships, such as FIA European Formula 3 Championship and Interserie.

== Lap records ==
The fastest official race lap records at the Kassel-Calden Circuit are listed as:

Category	Time	Driver	Vehicle	Event
Full Circuit (1982–1987): 2.590 km (1.609 mi)
Formula Three	1:04.870	Oscar Larrauri	Euroracing 101	1982 Kassel European F3 round
Full Circuit (1971–1981): 2.645 km (1.644 mi)
Group 5 special production cars	0:54.800	Bob Wollek	Porsche 935/77A	1978 Kassel DRM round
Group 6 prototype	0:54.990	Volkert Merl	Porsche 908/03	1980 Kassel Interserie round
Sports prototype	0:55.200	Herbert Müller	Porsche 917/30	1974 Kassel Interserie round
Formula Three	0:55.250	Corrado Fabi	March 803	1980 Kassel European F3 round
Group 6 racing cars	0:57.100	Jörg Obermoser	TOJ SC302	1977 Kassel Interserie round
Group 4	0:57.900	Hans Heyer	Ford Escort RS	1978 Kassel DRM round
Group 5 sports cars	0:58.600	Helmut Bross	Lola T294	1977 Kassel Interserie round
Group 2	1:02.100	Harald Menzel	BMW 3.0 CSL	1973 Kassel DRM round
