= Lechner Spyder SC91 =

Lechner Spyder SC91 Reynard Spyder Reynard Horag
- Category: Can-Am/Interserie Division I
- Constructor: Reynard Motorsport

Technical specifications
- Engine: Judd 3,500 cc (213.6 cu in) 40-valve, DOHC V10, naturally-aspirated, mid-mounted
- Tyres: Avon

Competition history
- Notable entrants: Walter Lechner Racing School; Sebring Auspuff Team; Achleitner Motorsport
- Notable drivers: Walter Lechner; Josef Neuhauser
- Debut: 1991 Interserie Nürburgring Supersprint
Races	Wins
47 (49 entries)	11
- Teams' Championships: 2 (1997 Interserie, 1998 Interserie)
- Drivers' Championships: 2 (1997 Interserie Division I, 1998 Interserie Division I)

The Lechner Spyder SC91 was a sports prototype racing car, originally built by Reynard Motorsport for Walter Lechner and his Walter Lechner Racing School Interserie team in 1991. The car was rebuilt as the Reynard Spyder in 1993, and became known as the Reynard Horag in 1997. Throughout its career, it used a Formula 1-derived 3.5-litre Judd V10 engine. One car was built, and it proved successful; taking the Interserie Division I title in 1997 and 1998, in addition to being the strongest non-Porsche 962 in 1991, and the strongest non-Kremer CK7 Spyder in 1993.

== Racing history ==
=== 1991–1992 ===
In 1991, Reynard Motorsport were commissioned by Walter Lechner to build a sports prototype for the Division I class of the Interserie. The car they built was called the Lechner Spyder SC91, and used a 3.5-litre Judd V10 engine, similar to one used in Formula One. Lechner drove the car himself, usually under the "Walter Lechner Racing School" banner, and gave it its debut at the second round of the 1991 Interserie season, which was the Nürburgring Supersprint; he retired after five laps due to a vibration. Two weeks later, he competed in the next round, held at the Österreichring; Lechner took fifth in the first race, and sixth in the second, resulting in him being classified in fifth overall. Brands Hatch was next, and Lechner took third in the first race, and repeated the feat in the second race, although he was classified fourth overall. Lechner was unable to start the Most round, but returned for the Siegerlandring event. At Siegerlandring, Lechner struggled in the first race, and was only able to finish tenth; however, he finished second in the other race, and was classified in second overall. The final round of the season saw a return to the Österreichring; Lechner took second in the first race, and, despite dropping to fourth in the second race, took second overall. Lechner finished the season in fourth place, and was the most successful non-Porsche 962 driver.

Lechner retained the Spyder SC91 for the 1992 season, and ran it in the season opener, held at Mugello; he retired from the first race, and, despite taking fourth in the second race, he wasn't classified. The series then returned to the Nürburgring, but Lechner retired from the first race once more, and did not start the second. Lechner switched to the Lola Horag for the next two races, and an attempt at entering the Spyder SC91 in the fifth round of the season, held at Most, was unsuccessful; as a result, he retained the Lola Horag for the rest of the season. The Lola was a Division II car; Lechner finished 19th in Division I, and second in Division II.

=== 1993–1994 ===
In 1993, the Lechner Spyder SC91 was built with new bodywork, and was rechristened as the "Reynard Spyder". Lechner was still the car's owner and driver, however; and the rebuilt car was his choice for the 1993 Interserie season, and now run by the Sebring Auspuff Team. The rebuilt car's debut was a mixed bag; Lechner took the car's first ever victory in the first race of the first round, held at Jarama, before a retirement after 14 laps in the second race restricted him to ninth overall. It was a similar story at Mugello; Lechner retired following a collision after six laps in the first race, before a seventh in the second race secured 14th overall. The Interserie then moved to Most, but Lechner retired from both races, although he was classified 14th in the second. At Siegerlandring, however the car came good again; Lechner took second in the opening race, and won the second race, taking second overall. The penultimate round of the season was held at Donington Park; Lechner took third in the first race, but another victory in the second, which secured the car's first overall victory. The Österreichring held the final Interserie race of 1993, where Lechner's third in the first race, and second in the second race, secured another second overall. He finished third in the Division I driver's standings, behind both Kremer CK7 Spyders.

Lechner favoured the Lola Horag HSB for 1994, but would use the Reynard Spyder one last time; in the final round of the season, held at the Österreichring. Lechner started with a victory in the first race, and, by repeating the feat in the second race, took the overall victory. This would, however, prove to be the last time that Lechner raced the Reynard Spyder, as he opted to use the Lola Horag HSB for the next couple of years. This one race, however, was enough for Lechner to take ninth in the Division I championship for 1994; he had already won the Division II championship prior to that final race.

=== 1997–1999 ===
Lechner still retained the Reynard Spyder, and ran Josef Neuhauser in it for the 1997 Interserie season; the car was now known as the Reynard Morag, and the team as "Dark Dog Lechner Racing Team". The opening round at Spa saw Neuhauser finish second by just over two hundredths of a second to Karl Hasenbichler, and his Penske PC18. At Most, Neuhauser finished fifth in the first race, before a second place in the following race pulled him up to fourth overall. At the A1-Ring, Neuhauser took his first victory with the car, beating Karl-Heinz Becker's modified Minardi M190 by 21.4 seconds. The fourth and final round of the season was held at the Hungaroring; Neuhauser took second in the first race, and third in the second race, securing second place overall for the weekend. Neuhauser won the Division I driver's title for 1997, beating Ranieri Randaccio by 11 points.

Neuhauser remained in the Reynard Morag for the 1998 Interseries season, but switched to Achleitner Motorsport. The first round of the season, held at Most, saw Neuhauser struggle, and finish fifth overall (third in Division I), and last. The second round was also at Most, and here Neuhauser took two victories en route to winning the round outright. Next up was the A1-Ring, where Neuhauser won again, this time by 15.7 seconds from Karl-Heinz Becker. Neuhauser finished the season with another victory, this time at the Hungaroring. As a result, he retained his Interserie title, this time beating Becker by seven points.

The Reynard Morag was not used in the first round of the 1999 Interserie season, but Neuhauser ran the car in the second round, held at Most; now competing in Class 3, he took second in the first race, and third in the second race. Next was Grobnik, where Neuhauser won the first race, and followed this with second in the other race. The final round of the season was held at the Hockenheimring; here, electrical problems prevented Neuhauser from starting the first race, but he recovered to finish third in the second race. Neuhauser slipped to third in the driver's championship, finishing 1.5 points behind second-placed Michael Schuster's Argo JM19C. The car was retired after the end of the 1999 season.
