= TOJ SC205/SC206 =

Sports prototype race cars

- Category: Group 6 (Sports 2000)
- Constructor: Team Obermoser Jörg
- Designer(s): Jörg Obermoser
- Predecessor: TOJ SC204

Technical specifications
- Chassis: fibreglass body on aluminium monocoque, front and rear subframes
- Suspension (front): double wishbones, coil springs over dampers, anti-roll bar
- Suspension (rear): single top links, twin lower links, twin trailing arms, coil springs over dampers, anti-roll bar
- Length: 4,170 mm (164.2 in)
- Width: 1,800 mm (70.9 in)
- Height: 800 mm (31.5 in)
- Wheelbase: 2,410 mm (94.9 in)
- Engine: BMW M12/7 1,998 cc (122 cu in) naturally-aspirated I4 mid-engined, longitudinally mounted
- Transmission: Hewland FGA 5-speed manual

Competition history
- Debut: 1977 Interserie Nürburgring
Races	Wins	Podiums	Poles
24	6	28	2

The TOJ SC205 and TOJ SC206 are very similar sports prototype race cars, designed, developed and built by German racing team and constructor, Team Obermoser Jörg; constructed to the FIA's Group 6 category and specification of motor racing, specifically the European 2-Litre Sportscar Championship, in 1977 and 1978, respectively. Together, they won a total of 6 races, scored 28 podium finishes, and clinched 2 pole positions, plus an additional 12 class wins together. Like its predecessor SC204, it was powered by a naturally-aspirated 2.0 L (120 cu in) BMW M12/7 four-cylinder engine; producing 300 hp (220 kW).
