= March 821 =

Formula One car

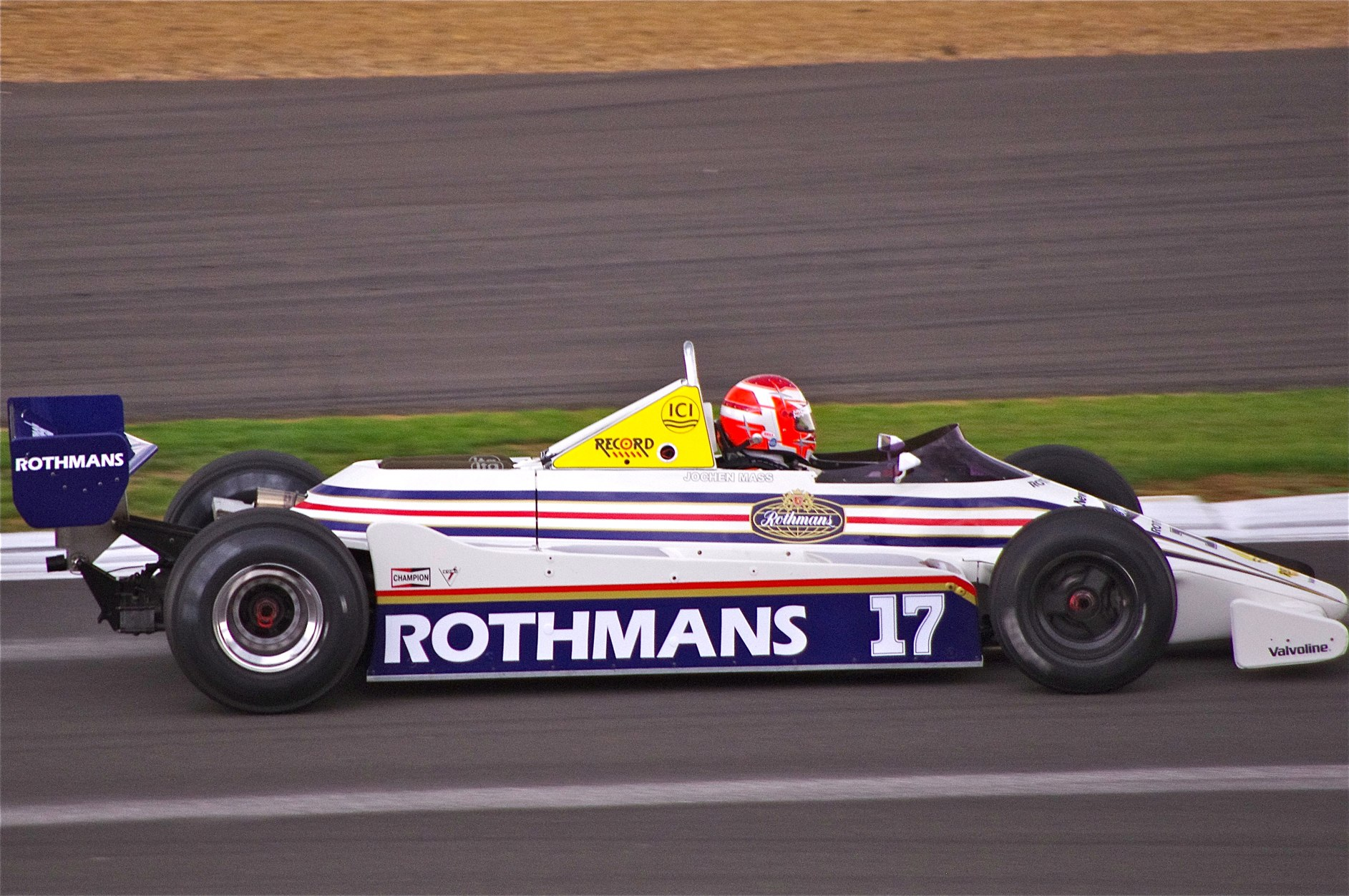
- Category: Formula One
- Constructor: RAM Racing (March Engineering)
- Designer: Adrian Reynard
- Predecessor: March 811
- Successor: March 87P

Technical specifications
- Chassis: Aluminium Honeycomb monocoque
- Suspension (front): Double wishbones, pull-rod-actuated coil springs and dampers, anti-roll bar
- Suspension (rear): Double wishbones, pull-rod-actuated coil springs and dampers, anti-roll bar
- Axle track: 1,734 mm (68.3 in) (Front); 1,581 mm (62.2 in) (Rear)
- Wheelbase: 2,781 mm (109.5 in)
- Engine: Ford-Cosworth DFV 2,993 cc (182.6 cu in) 90° V8 naturally aspirated mid-mounted
- Transmission: Hewland FGA 400 6-speed manual.
- Power: 490–504 hp (365–376 kW)
- Weight: 585 kg (1,290 lb)
- Tyres: Michelin; Avon

Competition history
- Notable entrants: March Engineering
- Notable drivers: (Germany) Jochen Mass (United Kingdom) Rupert Keegan (Brazil) Raul Boesel (Spain) Emilio de Villota
- Debut: 1982 South African Grand Prix
Races	Wins	Poles	F/Laps
22	0	0	0

The March 821 was a British Formula One racing car used by the John MacDonald-owned RAM Racing in the 1982 Formula One World Championship. Regardless of its model designation, the car had no connection with long-established race car manufacturer March Engineering. The car did not score any world championship points. Designed by Adrian Reynard, a total of five cars were built. It was also the last Formula One car to bear the "March" name until 1987, with March focusing most of their attention and resources into CART IndyCar racing.

== Background ==
The March 821 was designed on behalf of RAM Racing.

RAM Racing was a British racing team that had been involved in various motorsport classes since 1975. In the second half of the 1970s, the team's focus was on the Aurora AFX Formula One Series, an all-British championship run under Formula One regulations. RAM won the championship title of this series in the 1980 season. In the Formula 1 World Championship, on the other hand, RAM initially only competed sporadically. In 1976, 1977 and 1980 it used race cars from other manufacturers such as Brabham, March and Williams, which were purchased or rented, as a pure customer team at selected Grand Prix events . After RAM with the racer, Emilio de Villota won the Aurora Series in 1980, the team advanced to the Formula 1 World Championship in the 1981 season. Unlike in the Aurora series, the teams here had to construct their own racing cars. Lacking resources at RAM, the team joined forces with British racing car designer Robin Herd, who had co-founded March Engineering in 1969 and was still one of the owners of the established racing car manufacturer. Herd and RAM founded the company March Grand Prix in autumn 1980, which was legally and organizationally independent and had nothing to do with March Engineering. A technology transfer with March Engineering where still Formula 2 cars were manufactured did not take place. Herd designed the race car for the 1981 season, which was given the model name March 811 for reasons of publicity. The car proved uncompetitive; RAM boss John Macdonald publicly described it as "a pile of shit". At the end of the 1981 season, Robin Herd retired. RAM took over the facilities and equipment from March Grand Prix and continued racing under its own supervision through the 1982 season. Regardless of the separation from Herd, the racing team also competed under the March name in 1982. The March 821, the race car for 1982, also adopted this designation. However, the 821 is not considered a member of the traditional March family.

Brokered by former racing driver Guy Edwards, RAM had a sponsor in Rothmans at the start of the season, who invested “a lot of money” in the team. However, Rothmans left the team in the summer of 1982 after, contrary to expectations, no increase in performance had set in.

== Construction and technical development ==
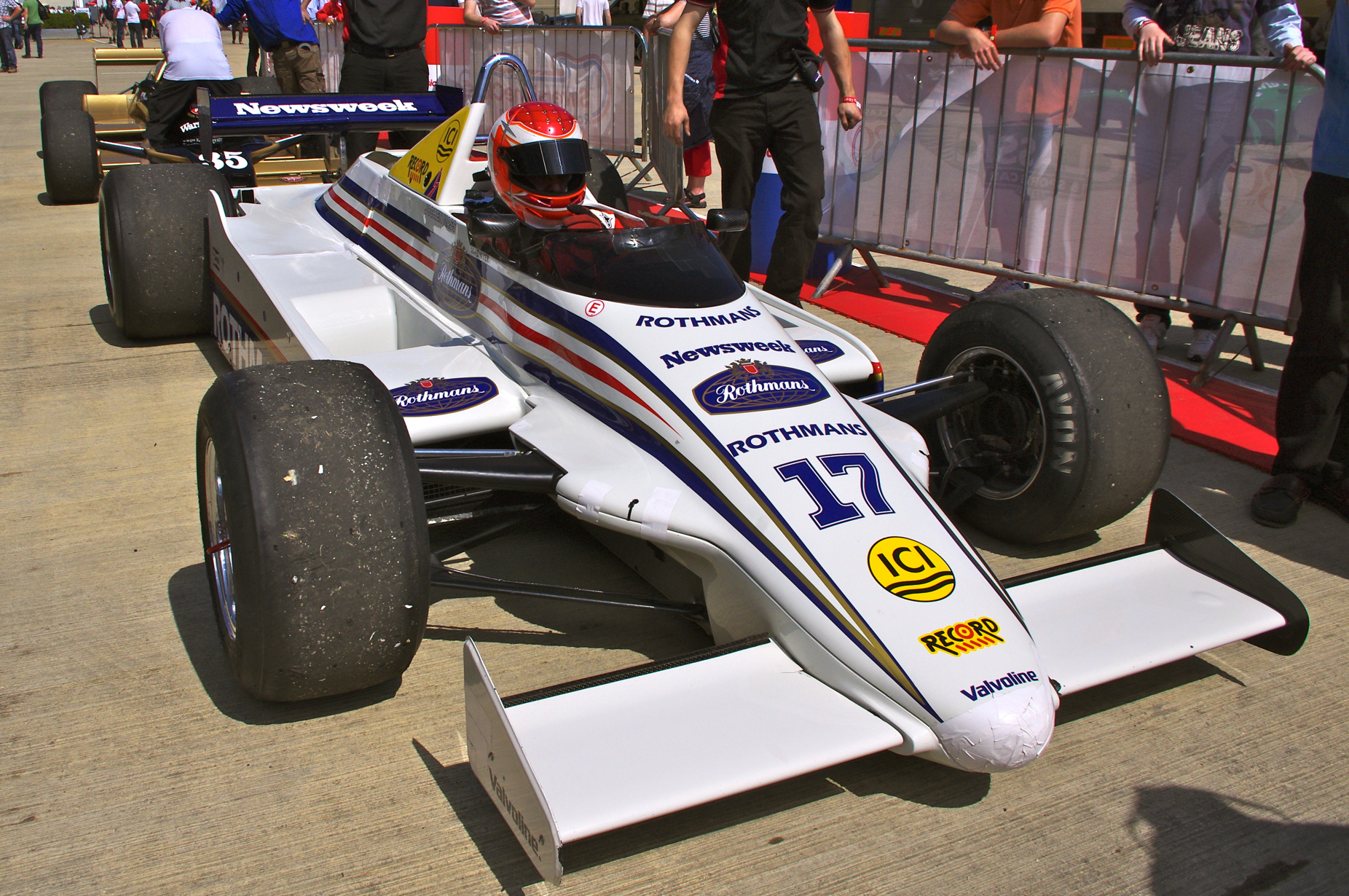
Williams FW07 style nose: March 821

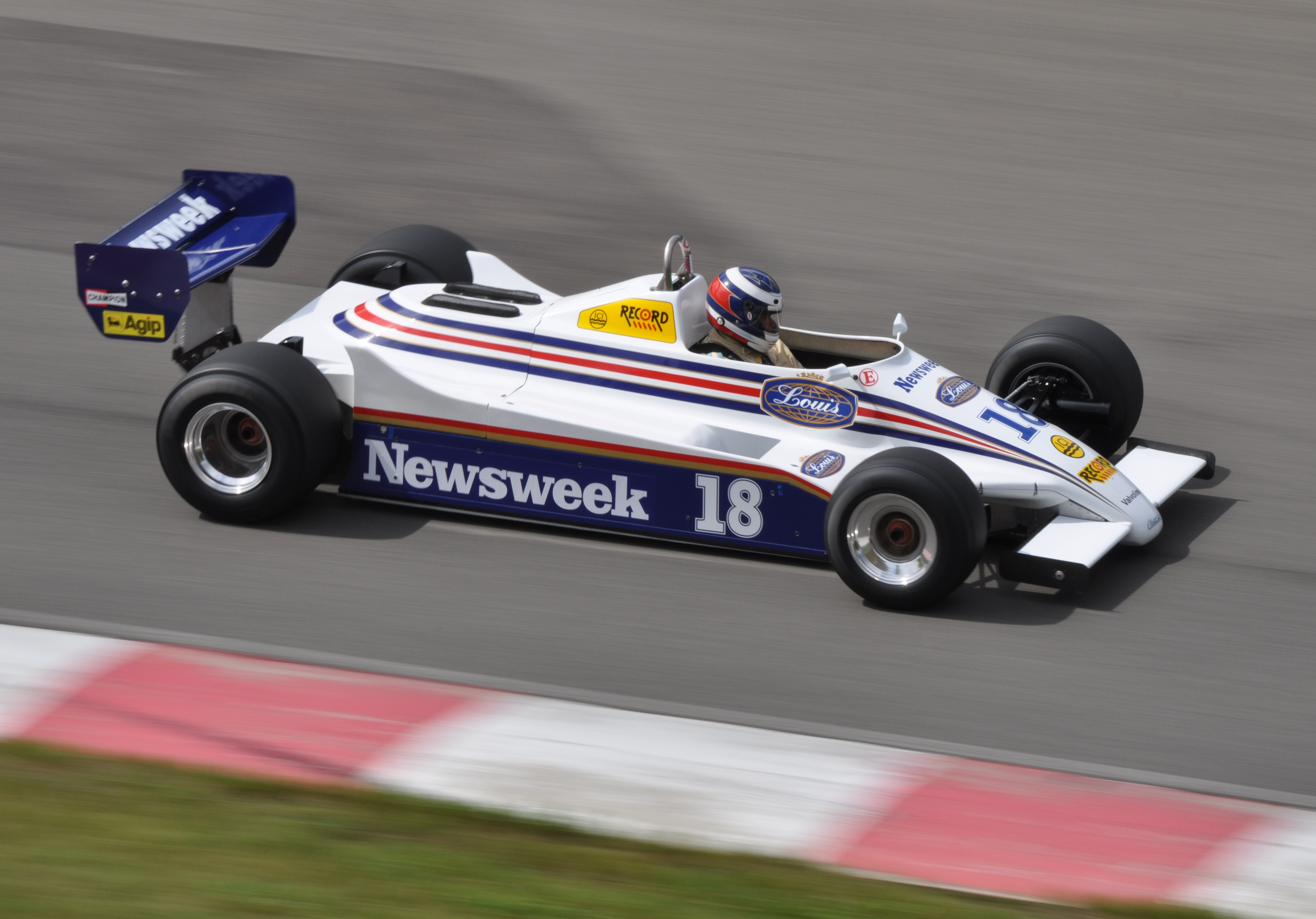
March 821

The responsible designer of the March 821 was Adrian Reynard. Reynard had been building racing cars since 1973 with his companies Saber Automotive and Reynard Motorsport. He joined RAM Racing in 1981, initially as a technical consultant, to support Robin Herd. With Herd's departure in late 1981, Reynard took over as Technical Manager. The 821 was the first Formula One car designed by Reynard.

The March 821 was an evolution of the previous year's 811. Observers said the 821 was "the car the 811 should have been back in the spring of 1981." Conceptually, the 821 still followed the lines of the Williams FW07, which had been very successful in 1979 and 1980. The 821 was lighter than its predecessor. At 585 kg, its weight was within the range of the minimum permissible weight, but – unlike many vehicles from the competing teams – it did not fall below this, so RAM was not able to influence the balance of the car over the course of the season with purposefully distributed ballast.

Contrary to the general trend towards turbo engines, RAM continued to stick to naturally aspirated engines. As with the previous model, RAM used a 3.0-litre eight-cylinder Cosworth DFV engine in the 821. As a result, the team increasingly fell behind in terms of performance: while the DFV engines, depending on the tuner, delivered between 490 and 530 hp, the turbo engines already achieved 560 hp (Hart) or 600 hp (Ferrari, Renault) during the 1982 season.

Adrian Reynard tried in the spring of 1982 with anticipated sponsorship money from Rothmans, to launch a systematic development programme including wind tunnel testing, among other things. However, the program had to be abandoned after Rothmans ended supporting the team again in June 1982. Different explanations have been given for this: In retrospect, team boss John Macdonald was of the opinion that the Rothmans managers wanted to see good results too quickly: "They gave us money and expected that we would be at the front of the field within a few weeks - 'money pays it'”. The RAM driver Jochen Mass on the other hand saw the error elsewhere: Macdonald and "his boys took the money from the Rothmans and only paid their debts from previous years with it". The withdrawal of Rothmans meant that from the early summer of 1982, the development of the car "virtually came to a standstill".

Another problem was the supply of tyres. RAM started the season with tyres from Pirelli, which were provided to the team free of charge. After private tests in the spring of 1982 had shown that the 821 ran better with Avon tyres, RAM entered the Monaco Grand Prix switched to paid Avon tyres. Observers see this as a panic decision by Macdonald, who was hoping to improve performance to placate his impatient sponsors. A few days after the conclusion of the agreement, Avon announced that the British company would withdraw from Formula One in the short term. Macdonald then bought up all the remaining stock of Avon tyres that the team used until the autumn of 1982. The tyres proved uncompetitive: they were at the level of development as of January 1982, while Pirelli continued to develop and improve the performance of their own tyres throughout the year. RAM finally returned to Pirelli for the final race of the year.

== Scope of production ==
Five examples of the March 821 were produced during the year. The numbering of the individual chassis continued the system RAM had started the year before with the 811, produced in six examples. The first chassis of the 821 was then the RM07.

=== The individual chassis ===
The RM08, RM09, RM10, and RM11 chassis all remained in the RAM factory team. The RM07 chassis, on the other hand, was loaned to the Spanish driver Emilio de Villota in the spring of 1982, who entered it for five world championship races for his private racing team called LBT Team March. After de Villota gave up his Formula 1 project, RAM took over the RM07 for one of its regular drivers.

=== Use of the chassis in the 1982 Formula One World Championship ===
Grand Prix	821 RM07	821 RM08	821 RM09	821 RM10	821 RM11
South Africa	Raul Boesel	Jochen Mass			
Brazil		Jochen Mass	Raul Boesel		
United States		Jochen Mass	Raul Boesel		
San Marino					
Belgium	Emilio de Villota	Jochen Mass	Raul Boesel		
Monaco	Emilio de Villota	Jochen Mass	Raul Boesel		
United States	Emilio de Villota	Jochen Mass	Raul Boesel		
Canada	Emilio de Villota	Jochen Mass	Raul Boesel	Raul Boesel	
Netherlands	Emilio de Villota			Raul Boesel	Jochen Mass
United Kingdom				Raul Boesel	Jochen Mass
France				Raul Boesel; Jochen Mass	Jochen Mass
Germany	Raul Boesel				Jochen Mass; Rupert Keegan
Austria	Raul Boesel				Rupert Keegan
Switzerland	Raul Boesel				Rupert Keegan
Italy	Raul Boesel				Rupert Keegan
United States				Rupert Keegan	Raul Boesel

== Racing inserts ==
The March 821 was used by John MacDonald's works team in 1982, as well as by customer team LBT Team March. Neither driver achieved a world championship point with the car.

=== Formula One ===
RAM started out in 1982 as the Rothmans March Grand Prix Team. Initially, Jochen Mass and Raul Boesel were intended as regular drivers. Adrian Reynard retroactively considered the decision to be a mistake: Mass was too old to take risks, while Brazilian debutant Boesel lacked experience.

==== March Grand Prix Team ====
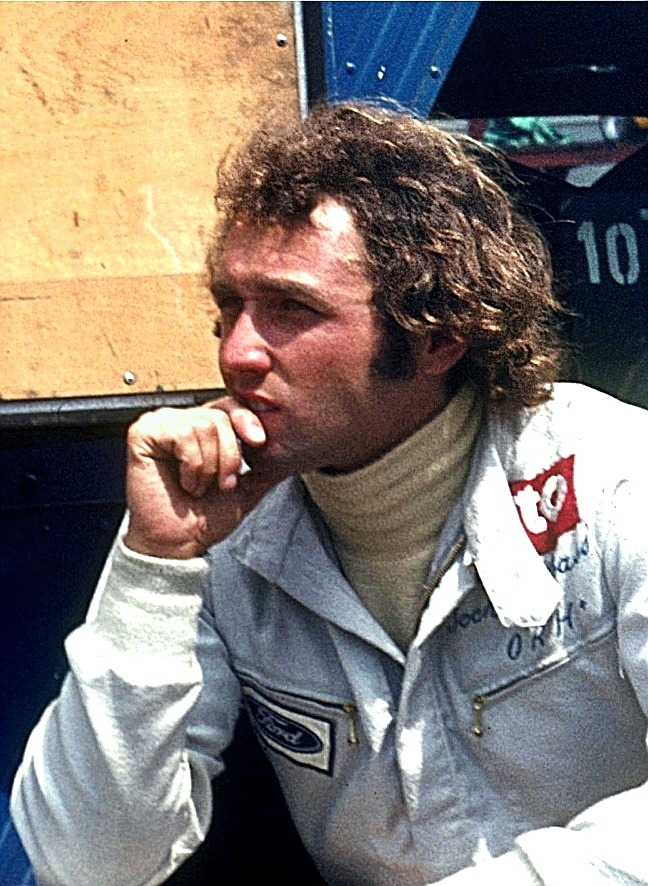
Jochen Mass drove his last Formula One race in the 821

Mass contested his last Formula 1 season in John Macdonald's team. With the exception of the Monaco Grand Prix, where the team competed with Avon tires for the first time, he was able to qualify regularly but repeatedly achieved worse times than his team-mate Boesel in qualifying practice. Mass's best qualifying result was 18th place in the US East Grand Prix at the Detroit street circuit; apart from that, he usually started from the last three rows of the grid. Mass finished 12th in South Africa and 10th in Brazil. At the latter race, however, he was finally classified eighth after Nelson Piquet (Brabham) and Keke Rosberg (Williams) had been disqualified for using illegal water tanks after the race. It was a similar story at the US West Grand Prix in Long Beach: Mass came in ninth and finished eighth after Gilles Villeneuve was disqualified for technical reasons. Mass achieved his best result of the season in Detroit, where he finished seventh, one lap down. There was a serious accident at the French Grand Prix: on the eleventh lap, Mass collided with Mauro Baldi's Arrows. Mass' 821 crashed into the guard rails, rolled over them, landed upside down in a spectator area, and caught fire. The roll bar of the 821 broke off on the first impact, and Mass' helmet also split open. Although injured, Mass was able to get out of the vehicle in time. Some spectators suffered minor injuries. Mass took part in the first Friday practice session for Macdonald's team at the subsequent German Grand Prix, but then withdrew due to excessive pain and announced his retirement from Formula One.

Rupert Keegan took over Mass' cockpit for the remaining five races. Keegan failed to qualify twice, including on his debut in Germany. Once his car broke down for technical reasons, at the Swiss Grand Prix a driving error led to his early retirement. Only in Las Vegas did Keegan finish, placing twelfth, three laps behind the winner.

The second chassis was entered for Raul Boesel at every Grand Prix in 1982. Boesel failed to pre-qualify in Monaco and missed qualification on four other occasions. His best grid position was 17th at the Brazilian Grand Prix, otherwise, like his teammates, he mostly started the race from the last three rows of the grid. Boesel finished four times; his best result was an eighth place, which he achieved after the disqualification of Niki Lauda in Belgium. Boesel retired four times due to technical defects in the engine or the chassis. At the Canadian Grand Prix, Boesel was indirectly involved in the fatal accident involving the Osella driver Riccardo Paletti. At the start, Didier Pironi stalled the engine of his Ferrari 126C2. Most of the following drivers managed to avoid the unexpected obstacle. However, Boesel reacted very late and touched the standing Ferrari. Riccardo Paletti, whose view of the stationary vehicle had previously been blocked by Boesel, was unable to react in time and crashed violently into the rear of the Ferrari.

=== LBT Team March ===
Emilio de Villota entered the March 821 RM07 for his privateer team, LBT Team March, in five Grands Prix. LBT was the last team to use customer chassis in Formula 1. The organization of the racing was not by RAM Racing but by the Formula 2 racing team Onyx Racing, which was managed by Mike Earle. Earle referred to de Villota as "the last gentleman driver". He had technical understanding; however, his talent was not enough to establish himself in the Formula 1 World Championship with a mediocre car.

De Villota entered his March 821 at the Belgian, Monaco, Canadian, US East and Dutch Grands Prix. In Belgium and Monaco, he already failed in the pre-qualification, in the other three World Championship races he failed to qualify. Usually, de Villota drove the slowest lap time; an exception was the US East Grand Prix, where he was faster than Nelson Piquet in the new, largely untested BMW-turbocharged Brabham BT50.

=== Interserie ===
In the spring of 1983, Walter Lechner took over chassis 821 RM08. He raced it seven times in the Interserie between May 1983 and October 1984. Lechner won two races: the race on the Österreichring in May 1983 and the Siegerland race in September 1983.

== Complete Formula One World Championship results ==
(key)

Year	Driver	1	2	3	4	5	6	7	8	9	10	11	12	13	14	15	16	Points	WCC
1982		RSA	BRA	USW	SMR	BEL	MON	DET	CAN	NED	GBR	FRA	GER	AUT	SUI	ITA	CPL	0	—
1982	(Germany) Jochen Mass	12	8	8		DNF	DNQ	7	11	DNF	10	DNF						0	—
1982	(United Kingdom) Rupert Keegan												DNQ	DNF	DNF	DNQ	12	0	—
1982	(Brazil) Raul Boesel	15	DNF	10		8	DNPQ	DNF	DNF	DNF	DNQ	DNQ	DNF	DNQ	DNF	DNQ	10	0	—
1982	(Spain) Emilio de Villota					DNPQ	DNPQ	DNQ	DNQ	DNPQ								0	—
