= Siegerland Airport =

Siegerland Airport Siegerlandflughafen
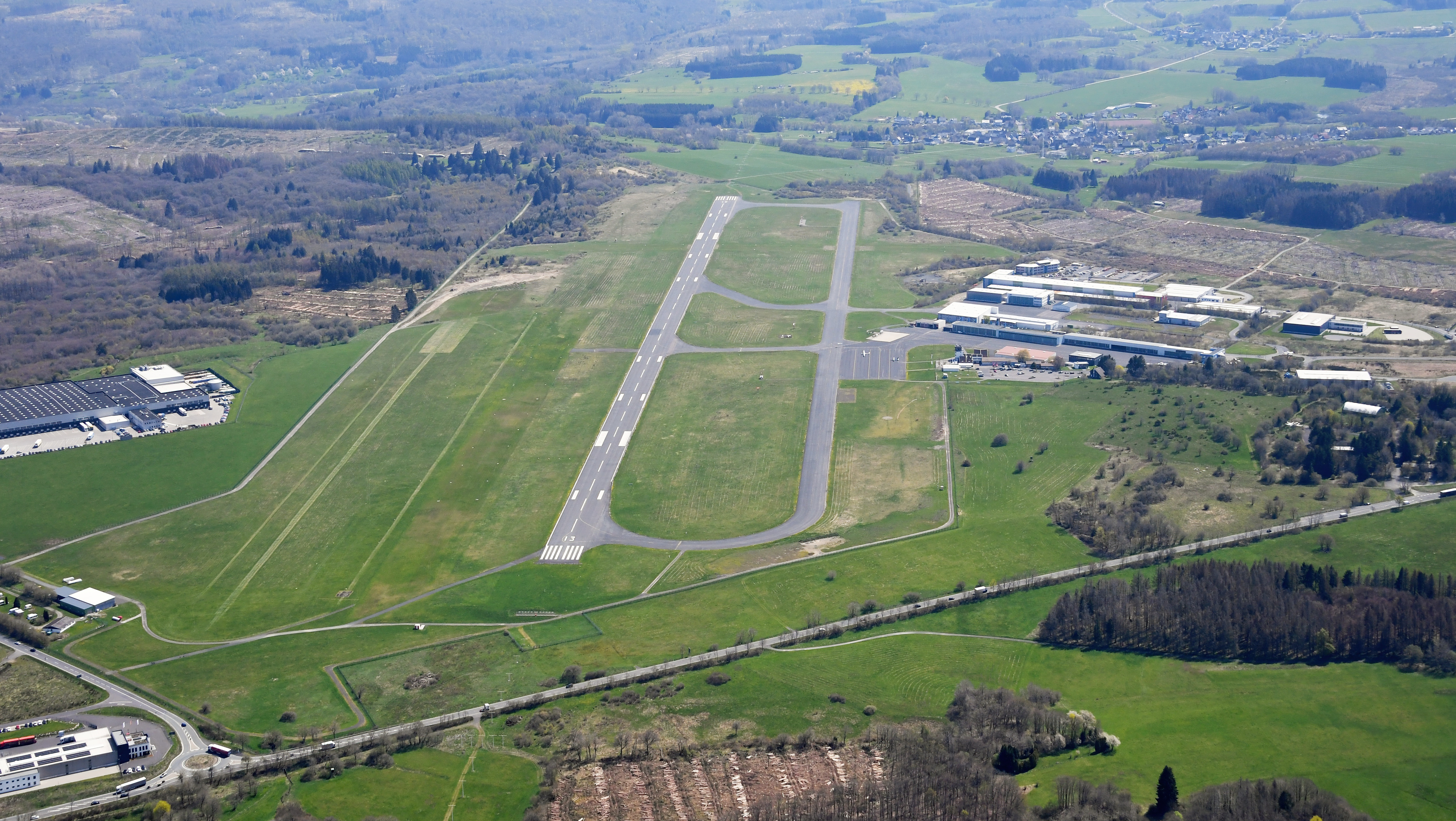
- IATA: SGE; ICAO: EDGS

Summary
- Serves: Siegerland, Germany
- Location: Burbach
- Elevation AMSL: 1,965 ft (599 m)
- Coordinates: 50°42′28″N 8°04′59″E
- Interactive map of Siegerland Airport

Runways
Direction	Length		Surface
Direction	ft	m	Surface
04/22	1,460	500	Grass
13/31	5,314	1,620	Asphalt
13L/31R	1,968	600	Grass
- AIP at German air traffic control.

Siegerland Airport (IATA: SGE, ICAO: EDGS) or Siegerlandflughafen in German is a small regional airport in Burbach in the Siegerland region near Siegen, Germany. It was formerly served by the Scheuerfeld–Emmerzhausen railway and is presently used as the maintenance base for Avanti Air.

== Airlines and destinations ==
There are no scheduled services to and from Siegerland Airport as it is largely used for general aviation and parachuting.

== Motorsports ==
Siegerlandring
- Full Circuit (1980–2000)
- Location: Burbach, North Rhine-Westphalia
- Opened: 14 September 1980; 45 years ago
- Closed: 14 May 2000; 26 years ago
- Major events: Formula König (1997–2000); Formula Renault 2.0 Germany (1997–1999); Porsche Carrera Cup Germany (1996–1998); Interserie (1982–1987, 1989–1996); DPM (1985); German F3 (1980–1981, 1985, 1987)
- Website: https://www.siegerland-airport.de/

Full Circuit (1980–2000)
- Length: 3.346 km (2.079 mi)
- Turns: 16
- Race lap record: 1:01.960 ( (Argentina) Oscar Larrauri, Porsche 962C, 1992, Group C)

From 1980 to 2000, Siegerlandring also hosted motorsport events, such as the Formula König, Formula Renault 2.0 Germany, Porsche Carrera Cup Germany, Interserie, Deutschen Produktionswagen Meisterschaft, German Formula Three Championship championships.

=== Lap records ===
The fastest official race lap records at Siegerlandring are listed as:

Category	Time	Driver	Vehicle	Event
Airfield Circuit (1980–2000): 3.346 km (2.079 mi)
Group C	1:01.960	Oscar Larrauri	Porsche 962C	1992 Siegerland Interserie round
Formula One	1:04.150	Walter Lechner	March 821	1983 Siegerland Interserie round
Group 6	1:06.384	Volkert Merl	Porsche 908/3 Turbo	1982 Siegerland Interserie round
Formula Three	1:10.980	Frank Jelinski	Ralt RT3	1981 Siegerland German F3 round
Group A	1:21.960	Per-Gunnar Andersson	Volvo 240 Turbo	1985 Siegerland DPM round

== See also ==
- Transport in Germany
- List of airports in Germany
