= Kremer K8 Spyder =

German endurance sports car prototype

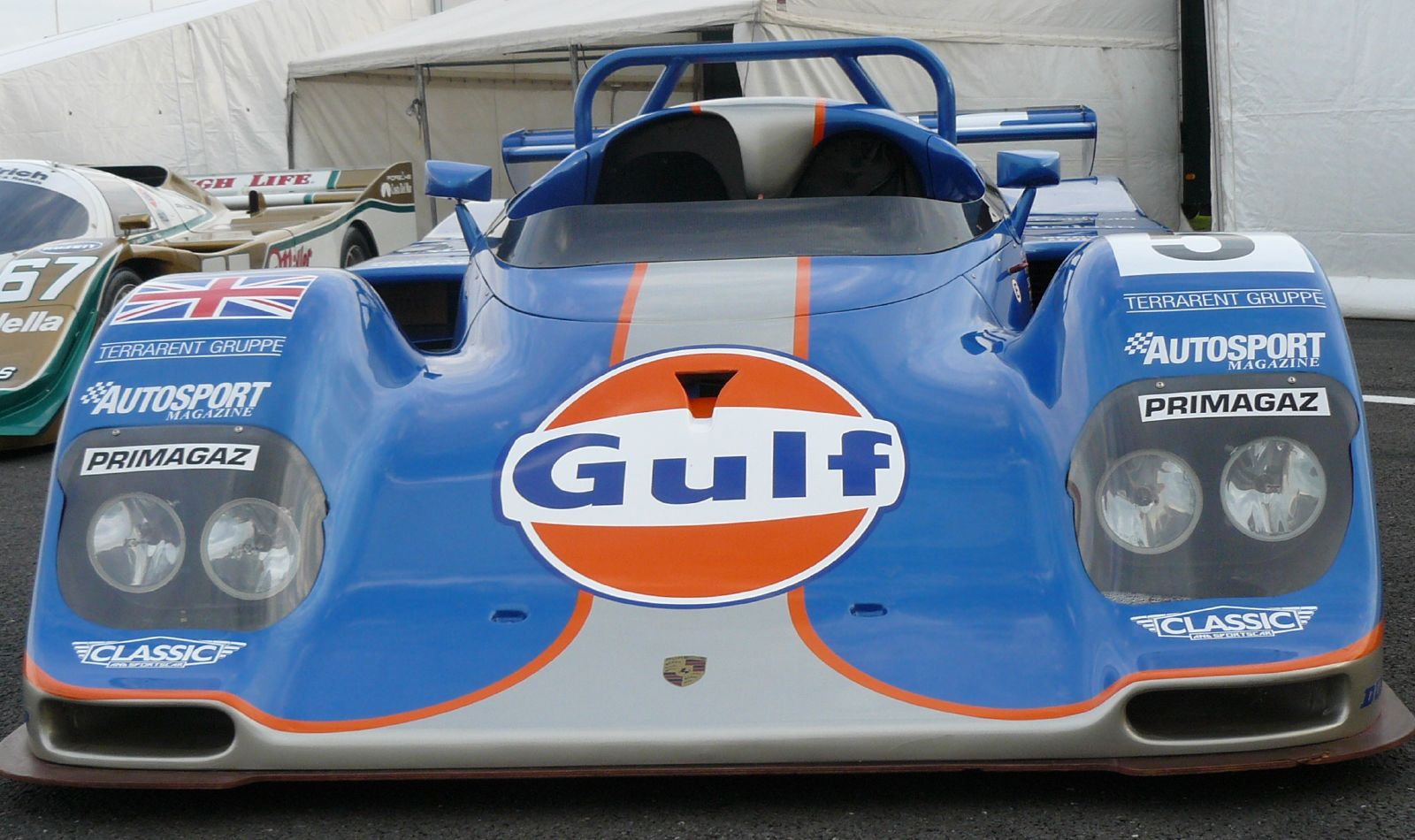
The Kremer K8 Spyder as it appeared at the 1994 24 Hours of Le Mans.

The Kremer K8 Spyder, along with its predecessor, the K7 (1992–1993), were open-cockpit prototypes built by Kremer Racing for use in multiple sportscar series, such as the IMSA GT Championship, Interserie, and International Sports Racing Series. The cars shared many components from the retired Porsche 962 and would eventually go on to win the 24 Hours of Daytona and several championships.

== Development ==
=== K7 ===
In 1991 Kremer Racing raced in the World Sportscar Championship with their aged 962 CK6s which were no longer competitive against the 3.5 litre machinery of works teams Jaguar, Peugeot and Mercedes. In 1992, Kremer Racing had abandoned the World Sportscar Championship due to the ban of turbo cars. The racing company therefore turned to the smaller Interserie championship, which continued to allow Kremer's 962 CK6s to compete alongside a wide variety of machinery. However, teams in the Interserie at the time were opting more and more for open-cockpit Formula One or CART-based machines with bodywork attached to them for more downforce. This left the closed-cockpit prototypes like the 962 CK6 at a disadvantage due to their heavier weight. Kremer Racing chose to therefore turn their coupés into open-cockpit cars in an attempt to lower weight and increase speed.

Kremer initially took one of their existing 962 CK6s and began extensive modifications to the bodywork. The roof and windshield of the cockpit were removed, while the doors were replaced with new bodywork to surround the open cockpit. This bolstering of the side bodywork moved the driver to a more central position, similar to an open-wheel formula car. Because of the elimination of the doors, the large intakes on either side of the cockpit were also reshaped, with a large cut to allow air to flow in from the side of the car.

The engine cover was retained in order to give the driver rollover protection as well as to maintain some of the 962CK6's original aerodynamics. Underneath the bodywork, most of the mechanicals of the 962 were retained, including the Type-935 3.2 litre Flat-6 engine. These cars became known as the Kremer K7 Spyder, with at least two built specifically for Interserie use. The car debuted in the second round of the championship, at the Nürburgring on 17 May 1992, finishing second to Oscar Larrauri's classical Joest Racing Porsche 962 C. It then won the three following races at Brands Hatch, Zolder and Most. In rounds 6 (Siegerland) and 7 (Zeltweg) it again finishing second to Oscar Larrauri's 962. The last race at Jarama brought poor results but it did not prevent Manuel Reuter from becoming Interserie champion.

=== K8 ===
Following the success of the K7s in Interserie use, Kremer saw the opportunity to adapt their design to the new open-cockpit formulas that were allowed in the IMSA GT Championship and at the 24 Hours of Le Mans. Once again, the 962 CK6s were used as a base, although some styling elements were changed between the K7 and the new K8 Spyder in order to conform to the rules used in these events.

The K8s would be required to maintain their two-seater layout as had been the case with the 962 CK6s. This meant that the large bodywork replacing the doors was replaced with a much lower design which incorporated a windshield. The rules also necessitated the addition of a rollbar to the top of the engine cover, to better protect a driver's head in the event of a rollover. Also, to meet engine requirements, Kremer chose to use a smaller variant of the Type-935 Flat-6, running only a 3.0-litre displacement. The large snorkels for feeding the turbochargers were also replaced with a more discreet inlet.

Four K8 Spyders were built by Kremer.

== Racing history ==
The initial K7 made its debut during the 1992 Interserie season. Running alongside an unmodified 962CK6, the K7 was able to perform well in its first event at the Nürburgring on 17 May, winning one heat and finishing second overall before going on to win the Brands Hatch event overall on July 26. The K7 would go on to take victories at Zolder Circuit and Autodrom Most, leading to Kremer Racing winning the team's championship and Manuel Reuter winning the driver's championship.

For 1993, a second K7 would be completed, replacing the older 962CK6. The team would immediately show their dominance in the series, finishing in first and second place at Jarama. Both cars would have top-three finishes for the rest of the season until the final round when a lone K7 would suffer problems and finish in seventh. With four wins on the season, Giovanni Lavaggi was able to win the driver's championship, but Kremer would ultimately finish second to S.C.I. in the team's championship.

In 1994, Kremer concentrated solely on the development of the new K8 Spyder for its debut at the 24 Hours of Le Mans. Directed by Project 100 Communications, bringing backing by Gulf Oil sponsorship, as well as other secondary sponsors, the K8 Spyder would be the only open-cockpit car competing in the LMP1/C90 class. The design proved its speed by qualifying second on the grid alongside a Courage-Porsche. Project 100 Communications brought two of the drivers; Derek Bell and Robin Donovan (partner in Project 100 Communications at the time), while Kremer brought Jürgen Lässig to the joint venture. They ran towards the top of the field for most of the race, but eventually they finished the race in sixth, nearly thirty laps behind the winning Dauer 962.

After Le Mans, Kremer Racing chose to prove the endurance capabilities of the K8 again by entering the car into the IMSA GT Championship debut event of the 1995 season, the 24 Hours of Daytona. Although the car did not qualify well, the driving team of Giovanni Lavaggi, Jürgen Lässig, Marco Werner, and Christophe Bouchut were eventually able to take the race victory by five laps over the nearest competitor. The team followed to the next event, the 12 Hours of Sebring, but the K8 suffered mechanical problems and finished a distant 30th place.

The team therefore returned to Europe, where the second K8 was now completed and waiting competition. Both cars were entered in Le Mans once again. Now in a field full of open-cockpit prototypes, the K8s faced stiffer competition from the likes of Courage and the new custom-built Ferrari 333 SP. One K8 would muster only a fifth place qualifying spot, which the team was eventually able to turn into a sixth-place finish. The second car lacked pace for most of the race and eventually withdrew with electrical problems. After Le Mans, Kremer chose to finish the year in Interserie once again, using a CK7 in two of the final three rounds, earning themselves a sole victory.

For 1996, Kremer began to concentrate more on the new BPR Global GT Series, running Porsche 911 GT2s. However, two K8 were once again brought out for Le Mans following slight evolutions to their bodywork. The age of the cars led to them slipping further down in qualifying, managing to only make 13th. During the race, both cars failed to finish: One due to an accident and the other suffering an engine failure. The team would perform even worse in 1997, when one of two cars failed to qualify for the race. The lone entry dropped out of the event in the first half with an engine failure.

However, the K8 saw regular competition once again during 1997. The team would enter into the 1000 km Monza victory for John Nielsen and Thomas Bscher. After Le Mans, the team would enter the new International Sports Racing Series. Two K8s would compete in the final round of the series' debut season, earning third and seventh places. For the next year, the two evolved cars would be entered in the full season. The season opener would see the best result for the K8 with a second place, with the team eventually finishing in eighth place in the team's championship. A lone K8 would also again be entered at Le Mans, where the evolved car was able to improve on its previous performances by finishing in 12th, yet second in the LMP1 class.

1999 would be the final year of competition for the K8 Spyders, as Kremer Racing purchased a new Lola B98/10 for use in the ISRS. However, before their Lola was completed, the team used a K8 in the first two rounds of the season and finishing ninth in one of the events. A second K8 was sold to the privateer Dutch team BPR Competition who had success early in the season, but eventually withdrew from the series.
