= TOJ SC204 =

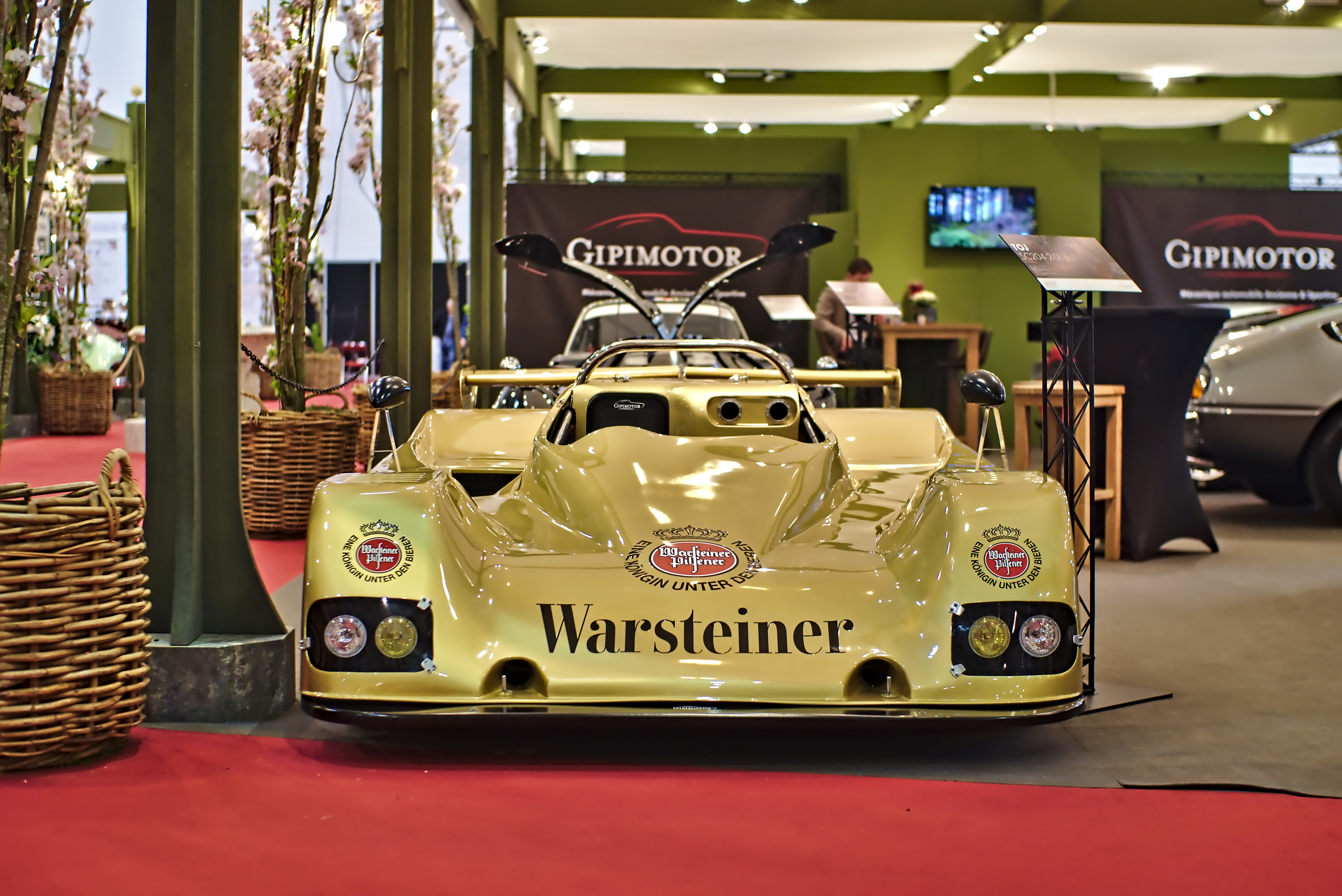
- Category: Group 6
- Constructor: Team Obermoser Jörg
- Designer(s): Jörg Obermoser
- Predecessor: TOJ SC03
- Successor: TOJ SC205/SC206

Technical specifications
- Chassis: fibreglass body on aluminium monocoque, front and rear subframes
- Suspension (front): double wishbones, coil springs over dampers, anti-roll bar
- Suspension (rear): single top links, twin lower links, twin trailing arms, coil springs over dampers, anti-roll bar
- Length: 4,480 mm (176.4 in)
- Width: 1,896 mm (74.6 in)
- Height: 900 mm (35.4 in)
- Axle track: 1,570 mm (61.8 in) (front); 1,445 mm (56.9 in) (rear)
- Wheelbase: 2,405 mm (94.7 in)
- Engine: BMW M12/7 1,998 cc (122 cu in) naturally-aspirated I4 mid-engined, longitudinally mounted
- Transmission: Hewland 5-speed manual

Competition history
- Debut: 1976 Mainz-Finthen
Races	Wins	Podiums	Poles
24	3	9	1

The TOJ SC204 is a sports prototype race car, designed, developed and built by German racing team and constructor, Team Obermoser Jörg; constructed to the FIA's Group 6 category and specification of motor racing, specifically the European 2-Litre Sportscar Championship, in 1976. Its career spanned 3 years, and it only managed to score 2 podium finishes, with its best result being a 3rd-place finish. Like its predecessor, it was powered by a naturally-aspirated 2.0 L (120 cu in) BMW M12/7 four-cylinder engine; producing 300 hp (220 kW).
