= TOJ SS02 =

Sports prototype race car

- Category: Group 5
- Constructor: Team Obermoser Jörg
- Designer(s): Jörg Obermoser
- Successor: TOJ SC03

Technical specifications
- Chassis: fibreglass body on aluminium monocoque, front and rear subframes
- Suspension (front): double wishbones, coil springs over dampers, anti-roll bar
- Suspension (rear): single top links, twin lower links, twin trailing arms, coil springs over dampers, anti-roll bar
- Engine: BMW M12/7 1,998 cc (122 cu in) naturally-aspirated I4 mid-engined, longitudinally mounted
- Transmission: Hewland 5-speed manual
- Weight: 575 kg (1,268 lb)
- Tyres: Firestone

Competition history
- Debut: 1974 Trophée d'Europe Paul Ricard
Races	Wins	Podiums	Poles
24	3	9	1

The TOJ SS02 is a 2-liter sports prototype race car, designed, developed and built by German racing team and constructor, Team Obermoser Jörg; constructed to the FIA's Group 5 category and specification of racing, specifically the European 2-Litre Sportscar Championship, in 1975. Its career spanned seven years, and in that period of time, it managed 2 class wins, and 3 podium finishes, and one pole position. It was powered by a naturally-aspirated 2.0 L (120 cu in) BMW M12/7 four-cylinder engine; producing 285 hp (213 kW).
