= 1981 German Formula Three Championship =

Seasons
- ← 1980 1982 →

The 1981 German Formula Three Championship (German: 1981 Deutsche Formel-3-Meisterschaft) was a multi-event motor racing championship for single-seat open wheel formula racing cars held in Germany, Belgium and Austria. The championship featured drivers competing in two-litre Formula Three racing cars which conformed to the technical regulations, or formula, for the championship. It commenced on 29 March at Nürburgring and ended at the same place on 20 September after eleven rounds.

Bertram Schäfer Racing driver Frank Jelinski had successfully defended his championship crown. He won races at Wunstorf, Erding and Nürburgring. Franz Konrad lost in the title battle just by three points. Stefan Bellof completed the top-three in the drivers standings with wins at Diepholz, Hockenheim and Siegerland. Peter Schindler and 1981 FIA European Formula 3 Championship driver Oscar Larrauri were the only other drivers who won race in the season.

== Teams and drivers ==
Entry List
| Team | Driver | Chassis | Engine | Rounds |
|---|---|---|---|---|
| (West Germany) AC Mayen | (West Germany) Bernd Suckow | Chevron B47 | Toyota | 1–3, 10–11 |
| (West Germany) Andy Wietzke | (West Germany) Andy Wietzke | Martini MK34/016 | Toyota | 4–11 |
| (West Germany) Bertram Schäfer Racing | (West Germany) Frank Jelinski | Ralt RT3/214 | Toyota | 1, 3–11 |
| (Sweden) Bewa Fritid | (Sweden) Thomas Kaiser | Ralt RT3/245 | Toyota | 2, 7 |
| (France) BP Racing | (France) Alain Ferté | Martini MK34 | Alfa Romeo | 1 |
| (West Germany) Druck Chemie — Partner der Druckindustrie | (West Germany) Helmut Bross | Maco 381/M017 | Toyota | 2–4, 10–11 |
| (West Germany) Druck Chemie — Partner der Druckindustrie | (Mexico) Miguel Muniz-Rizo | Maco 381/M017 | Toyota | 5–7 |
| (West Germany) Druck Chemie — Partner der Druckindustrie | (West Germany) Harald Brutschin | Ralt RT3 | Toyota | 1–7 |
| (West Germany) Druck Chemie — Partner der Druckindustrie | (Belgium) Herve Roger | Ralt RT3 | Toyota | 1–9 |
| (West Germany) Druck Chemie — Partner der Druckindustrie | (West Germany) Thomas von Löwis | Ralt RT3 | Toyota | 11 |
| (West Germany) Druck Chemie — Partner der Druckindustrie | (Belgium) Maurice Roger | Chevron B47/47–79–02 | Toyota | 1–6, 8–9, 11 |
| (France) Ecurie Elf Antar | (France) Denis Morin | Martini MK34 | Toyota | 1 |
| (France) Ecurie Motul Nogaro | (France) Philippe Streiff | Martini MK34 | Alfa Romeo | 1 |
| (West Germany) EMSC Bitburg | (West Germany) Albert Hamper | Chevron | Toyota | 6, 9 |
| (West Germany) EMSC Bitburg | (West Germany) Manfred Hebben | Ralt RT1 | Toyota | All |
| (West Germany) EMSC Bitburg | (West Germany) Heinrich Heintz | Ralt RT1/23 | BMW | 2, 6, 8–9, 11 |
| (West Germany) EMSC Bitburg | (West Germany) Harald Tonat | March | BMW | 3–7 |
| (West Germany) Escuderia TR Balear | (West Germany) Helmut Kalenborn | Derichs D37/F3-78-02 | Toyota | 6 |
| (Italy) Euroracing | (Italy) Mauro Baldi | March 813/4 | Alfa Romeo | 1 |
| (Italy) Euroracing | (Italy) Fabio Mancini | March 813 | Alfa Romeo | 1 |
| (Switzerland) Formel Rennsport Club | (Switzerland) Hanspeter Kaufmann | March 803/11 | Toyota | 8–9, 11 |
| (Switzerland) Formel Rennsport Club | (Switzerland) Marcus Simeon | Argo JM3 | Toyota | 7, 11 |
| (Switzerland) Formel Rennsport Club | (Switzerland) Robert Treichler | March 783 | Toyota | 2, 8–9 |
| (Switzerland) Formel Rennsport Club | (Switzerland) Jo Zeller | March 793 | Toyota | All |
| (Switzerland) Fredy Eschenmoser | (Switzerland) Fredy Eschenmoser | Ralt RT3 | | 8 |
| (West Germany) Gelo Nachwuchs Racing Team | (West Germany) Stefan Bellof | Ralt RT3/215 | Toyota | 3–11 |
| (West Germany) Gebhardt Motorsport — Spiess Tuning | (West Germany) Günter Gebhardt | Ralt RT3 | Mercedes | 2–7 |
| (West Germany) Gummi Scheufele Racing Team | (West Germany) Rudi Seher | March 793/4 | Toyota | 1–2, 4–5, 9 |
| (West Germany) Gummi Scheufele Racing Team | (West Germany) Gerold Hirth | Chevron B43 | Toyota | 1–2, 4–6 |
| (West Germany) Hans-Joachim Hösch | (West Germany) Hans-Joachim Hösch | Chevron B43 | Toyota | 3–4 |
| (West Germany) Heidsieck Monopole Racing Team | (United Kingdom) Donald Bradway | March 813 | Toyota | 1–7, 9–11 |
| (West Germany) Heidsieck Monopole Racing Team | (West Germany) Herbert Bürgmayr | March 803 | BMW | 4–5, 9 |
| (West Germany) Heidsieck Monopole Racing Team | (Mexico) Ramon Gonzales | March 803 | BMW | 6–7 |
| (West Germany) Heidsieck Monopole Racing Team | (West Germany) Gero Fleck | March 803B | Toyota | 1, 3, 10 |
| (West Germany) Heidsieck Monopole Racing Team | (West Germany) Jürgen Schlich | March 803B | Toyota | 2 |
| (West Germany) Heidsieck Monopole Racing Team | (West Germany) Uwe Teuscher | March 793 | Toyota | All |
| (Belgium) Hubert de Spiegelaere | (Belgium) Hubert de Spiegelaere | March 803B | | 8 |
| (Italy) Ignazio Rizza | (Italy) Ignazio Rizza | March 743/3 | BMW | 1, 9 |
| (West Germany) Jan Thoelke | (West Germany) Jan Thoelke | Maco 381/M024 | Toyota | 1–2 |
| (France) Jean-Louis Schlesser | (France) Jean-Louis Schlesser | Martini MK34/002 | Alfa Romeo | 1 |
| (Switzerland) Jeans Michel Racing Team | (Switzerland) Pierre-Alain Lombardi | Ralt RT3 | Toyota | 8 |
| (West Germany) Johann Eisenmann | (West Germany) Johann Eisenmann | March 753/5 | Toyota | 5–6 |
| (West Germany) Josef Kaufmann Racing | (West Germany) Josef Kaufmann | Martini MK31 | Toyota | All |
| (West Germany) Klaus Hansert | (West Germany) Klaus Hansert | Maco 378/M021 | BMW | 3 |
| (West Germany) Klaus Zimmermann Racing Team | (West Germany) Jochen Dauer | March 813 | Toyota | 11 |
| (Austria) Konrad Racing | (West Germany) Peter Kroeber | March 803 | Toyota | 1 |
| (France) Marlboro Racing for Zolder | (Belgium) Didier Theys | Martini MK34 | Alfa Romeo | 1, 8 |
| (Netherlands) Michael Bleekemolen | (Netherlands) Michael Bleekemolen | Ralt RT3/208 | Toyota | 8 |
| (West Germany) Monopole Suze Weigel Racing | (West Germany) Harald Brutschin | Ralt RT3 | Toyota | 8–10 |
| (West Germany) Monopole Suze Weigel Racing | (West Germany) Edgar Pohl | Ralt RT3 | Toyota | 11 |
| (France) Pascal Fabre | (France) Pascal Fabre | Martini MK34 | Alfa Romeo | 1 |
| (West Germany) Peter Cornand | (West Germany) Peter Cornand | Ralt RT1 | Toyota | 1–3, 5–6, 9–11 |
| (West Germany) Peter Wicks | (West Germany) Peter Wicks | Chevron B38 | Toyota | 6, 11 |
| (West Germany) Peter Wisskirchen | (West Germany) Peter Wisskirchen | Ralt RT1/137 | Toyota | 2–3, 6–7, 10–11 |
| (West Germany) RGA Sohler Ski Racing Team | (West Germany) Franz Oelmayer | Ralt RT1 | BMW | 4–5 |
| (Switzerland) Scuderia Calanda | (Switzerland) Jakob Bordoli | Martini MK31/003 | Toyota | 1 |
| (West Germany) Scuderia Colonia | (West Germany) Willi Hüsgen | Maco 376/M013 | Toyota | 1, 3, 6–11 |
| (Austria) Scuderia Teutonia | (Austria) Franz Konrad | March 803B/1 | Toyota | All |
| (Italy) Scuderia Torino Corse | (Argentina) Oscar Larrauri | March 813/7 | Toyota | 1 |
| (Italy) Scuderia Torino Corse | (Italy) Emanuele Pirro | Martini MK34 | Toyota | 1 |
| (West Germany) Team Motor Presse Dienst MPD „Sport“ | (West Germany) Bernd Wicks | Derichs D380/01 | Toyota | 3–11 |
| (West Germany) Thomas Holert | (West Germany) Thomas Holert | March 803 | Toyota | 1 |
| (Sweden) Thorbjörn Carlsson | (Sweden) Thorbjörn Carlsson | Ralt RT3/244 | Toyota | 2, 7 |
| (France) Total | (France) Philippe Alliot | Martini MK34 | Alfa Romeo | 1 |
| (Austria) Ursula Ortmann — Ortmann Racing Team | (Austria) Karl Hasenbichler | March 813/8 | Toyota | 2, 4, 6, 9 |
| (West Germany) Victory Team Berlin | (West Germany) Peter Katsarski | Ralt RT3 | Toyota | 1, 3–5, 7–11 |
| (Austria) Walter Lechner Racing School | (West Germany) Harald Brutschin | Ralt RT3 | Toyota | 11 |
| (Austria) Walter Lechner Racing School | (Austria) "Umberto Calvo" | Ralt RT3/220 | Toyota | 1, 4–5, 7–10 |
| (Austria) Walter Lechner Racing School | (Austria) Peter Schindler | Ralt RT3/234 | Toyota | 1–2, 5, 8 |

== Calendar ==
| Round | Location | Circuit | Date | Supporting |
|---|---|---|---|---|
| 1 | Nürburg, West Germany | Nürburgring | 29 March | XVI. ADAC Goodyear 300 km Rennen |
| 2 | Nürburg, West Germany | Nürburgring | 23 May | XXVII. ADAC 1000 km Rennen |
| 3 | Wunstorf, West Germany | Wunstorf Air Base | 21 June | ADAC-Flugplatzrennen Wunstorf |
| 4 | Erding, West Germany | Erding Air Base | 5 July | 4. ADAC-Flugplatz-Rennen Erding |
| 5 | Salzburg, Austria | Salzburgring | 12 July | 9. ADAC-Bavaria-Rennen |
| 6 | Nürburg, West Germany | Nürburgring | 19 July | ADAC-H.G.Bürger-Gedächtnisrennen — Preis von Luxembourg |
| 7 | Diepholz, West Germany | Diepholz Airfield Circuit | 26 July | 14. ADAC-Flugplatzrennen Diepholz |
| 8 | Heusden-Zolder, Belgium | Circuit Zolder | 23 August | 15. ADAC Westfalen-Pokal-Rennen" |
| 9 | Hockenheim, West Germany | Hockenheimring | 6 September | ADAC-Hessen Cup" |
| 10 | Siegerland, West Germany | Siegerland Airport | 13 September | 4. ADAC Siegerland Flughafenrennen |
| 11 | Nürburg, West Germany | Nürburgring | 20 September | VIII. ADAC-Bilstein-Super-Sprint |

== Results ==
| Round | Circuit | Pole position | Fastest lap | Winning driver | Winning team |
|---|---|---|---|---|---|
| 1 | (West Germany) Nürburgring | (Italy) Mauro Baldi | (Argentina) Oscar Larrauri | (Argentina) Oscar Larrauri | (Italy) Scuderia Torino Corse |
| 2 | (West Germany) Nürburgring | (Austria) Peter Schindler | (Austria) Peter Schindler | (Austria) Peter Schindler | (Austria) Walter Lechner Racing School |
| 3 | (West Germany) Wunstorf Air Base | (West Germany) Stefan Bellof | (West Germany) Stefan Bellof | (West Germany) Frank Jelinski | (West Germany) Bertram Schäfer Racing |
| 4 | (West Germany) Erding Air Base | (Austria) „Umberto Calvo“ | (West Germany) Stefan Bellof | (West Germany) Frank Jelinski | (West Germany) Bertram Schäfer Racing |
| 5 | (Austria) Salzburgring | (Austria) Franz Konrad | no data | (Austria) Peter Schindler | (Austria) Walter Lechner Racing School |
| 6 | (West Germany) Nürburgring | (West Germany) Stefan Bellof | (West Germany) Stefan Bellof | (West Germany) Frank Jelinski | (West Germany) Bertram Schäfer Racing |
| 7 | (West Germany) Diepholz Airfield Circuit | (West Germany) Stefan Bellof | (West Germany) Frank Jelinski | (West Germany) Stefan Bellof | (West Germany) Gelo Nachwuchs Racing Team |
| 8 | (Belgium) Circuit Zolder | (Austria) Peter Schindler | (Austria) Peter Schindler | (Austria) Peter Schindler | (Austria) Walter Lechner Racing School |
| 9 | (West Germany) Hockenheimring | (West Germany) Stefan Bellof | (West Germany) Stefan Bellof | (West Germany) Stefan Bellof | (West Germany) Gelo Nachwuchs Racing Team |
| 10 | (West Germany) Siegerland Airport | (Austria) „Umberto Calvo“ | (West Germany) Frank Jelinski | (West Germany) Stefan Bellof | (West Germany) Gelo Nachwuchs Racing Team |
| 11 | (West Germany) Nürburgring | (West Germany) Stefan Bellof | (West Germany) Harald Brutschin | (West Germany) Frank Jelinski | (West Germany) Bertram Schäfer Racing |

== Championship standings ==
- Points are awarded as follows:

| 1 | 2 | 3 | 4 | 5 | 6 | 7 | 8 | 9 | 10 |
|---|---|---|---|---|---|---|---|---|---|
| 20 | 15 | 12 | 10 | 8 | 6 | 4 | 3 | 2 | 1 |

| Pos | Driver | NÜR1 (West Germany) | NÜR2 (West Germany) | WUN (West Germany) | ERD (West Germany) | SAL (Austria) | NÜR3 (West Germany) | DIE (West Germany) | ZOL (Belgium) | HOC (West Germany) | SIE (West Germany) | NÜR4 (West Germany) | Points |
|---|---|---|---|---|---|---|---|---|---|---|---|---|---|
| 1 | (West Germany) Frank Jelinski | 7 | | 1 | 1 | 4 | 1 | 2 | Ret | 13 | 2 | 1 | 135 |
| 2 | (Austria) Franz Konrad | 10 | 2 | 3 | 3 | **2** | 2 | 3 | 6 | 3 | 3 | 2 | 132 |
| 3 | (West Germany) Stefan Bellof | | | **2** | 4 | 3 | **3** | **1** | 4 | **1** | 1 | **13** | 124 |
| 4 | (West Germany) Harald Brutschin | 6 | 3 | 5 | 5 | 5 | 4 | 14 | DNS | 2 | Ret | 3 | 93 |
| 5 | (Austria) Peter Schindler | Ret | **1** | | | 1 | | | **1** | | | | 60 |
| 6 | (Austria) „Umberto Calvo“ | Ret | | | **2** | 5 | | 4 | 5 | 4 | **4** | | 60 |
| 7 | (West Germany) Josef Kaufmann | 13 | 6 | 11 | 10 | 11 | 6 | 8 | 8 | Ret | 6 | 4 | 53 |
| 8 | (West Germany) Uwe Teuscher | 12 | 7 | 12 | 8 | 13 | 9 | 12 | Ret | 8 | 5 | 5 | 44 |
| 9 | (West Germany) Günter Gebhardt | | 8 | 4 | 6 | 6 | 5 | DNS | | | | | 36 |
| 10 | (West Germany) Andy Wietzke | | | | 15 | 7 | 7 | 7 | 10 | 5 | Ret | 6 | 33 |
| 11 | (West Germany) Bernd Wicks | | | 6 | 7 | 10 | 19 | Ret | 7 | 7 | 10 | 9 | 29 |
| 12 | (West Germany) Manfred Hebben | 17 | 14 | 9 | 19 | 9 | 8 | 11 | 9 | 12 | 11 | 11 | 17 |
| 13 | (West Germany) Peter Katsarski | DNQ | | 7 | 12 | 14 | | 8 | 13 | 10 | 8 | 17 | 14 |
| 14 | (West Germany) Rudi Seher | 15 | 10 | | 13 | Ret | | | | Ret | | | 9 |
| 15 | (Belgium) Herve Roger | DNQ | 13 | 8 | 14 | 12 | 10 | 9 | 15 | Ret | | | 9 |
| 16 | (West Germany) Helmut Bross | | 23 | Ret | 9 | | | | | | 7 | Ret | 6 |
| 17 | (West Germany) Thomas Holert | 16 | | | | | | | | | | | 4 |
| 18 | (West Germany) Jürgen Schlich | | 9 | | | | | | | | | | 4 |
| 19 | (West Germany) Jochen Dauer | | | | | | | | | | | 8 | 4 |
| 20 | (United Kingdom) Donald Bradway | DNQ | 16 | 10 | Ret | 18 | 11 | | 16 | 9 | Ret | 22 | 4 |
| 21 | (West Germany) Peter Wisskirchen | | 12 | 13 | | | 18 | Ret | | | 9 | 12 | 3 |
| 22 | (West Germany) Jan Thoelke | 18 | 15 | | | | | | | | | | 2 |
| 23 | (Belgium) Maurice Roger | DNS | 11 | 15 | 21 | Ret | DNS | | 17 | DNS | | 19 | 2 |
| 24 | (West Germany) Bernd Suckow | DNQ | 17 | 14 | | | | | | | Ret | 10 | 2 |
| 25 | (West Germany) Gero Fleck | 19 | | DSQ | | | | | | | 12 | | 1 |
| 26 | (West Germany) Herbert Bürgmayr | | | | 11 | 15 | | | | 11 | | | 1 |
| | (Mexico) Miguel Muniz-Rizo | | | | | 16 | 12 | DNS | | | | | 0 |
| | (West Germany) Willi Hüsgen | DNQ | | Ret | | | 16 | 15 | Ret | 17 | 13 | 18 | 0 |
| | (West Germany) Peter Wicks | | | | | | 13 | | | | | 15 | 0 |
| | (Mexico) Ramon Gonzales | | | | | | Ret | 13 | | | | | 0 |
| | (West Germany) Peter Cornand | DNQ | 20 | 16 | | 21 | 20 | | | 14 | Ret | 21 | 0 |
| | (West Germany) Gerold Hirth | DNQ | 19 | | 18 | 17 | 14 | | | | | | 0 |
| | (Austria) Karl Hasenbichler | | 24 | | 16 | | Ret | | | Ret | | | 0 |
| | (West Germany) Thomas von Löwis | | | | | | | | | | | 14 | 0 |
| | (West Germany) Helmut Kalenborn | | | | | | 15 | | | | | | 0 |
| | (West Germany) Albert Hamper | | | | | | Ret | | | 16 | | | 0 |
| | (West Germany) Edgar Pohl | | | | | | | | | | | 16 | 0 |
| | (West Germany) Johann Eisenmann | | | | | 20 | 17 | | | | | | 0 |
| | (West Germany) Hans-Joachim Hösch | | | Ret | 17 | | | | | | | | 0 |
| | (West Germany) Heinrich Heintz | | 21 | | | | 21 | | 19 | 18 | | 20 | 0 |
| | (Switzerland) Robert Treichler | | 18 | | | | | | Ret | Ret | | | 0 |
| | (Switzerland) Marcus Simeon | | | | | | | | 18 | | | Ret | 0 |
| | (West Germany) Franz Oelmayer | | | | 20 | 19 | | | | | | | 0 |
| | (West Germany) Peter Kroeber | 20 | | | | | | | | | | | 0 |
| | (West Germany) Harald Tonat | | | Ret | 22 | 22 | 22 | DNS | | | | | 0 |
| | (West Germany) Klaus Hansert | | | Ret | | | | | | | | | 0 |
| | (West Germany) Herbert Lingmann | | DNS | | | | | | | | | | 0 |
| | (West Germany) Heinz Hermann | | | DNS | | | | | | | | | 0 |
| | (West Germany) Rainer Lindeken | | | | | | DNS | | | DNS | | | 0 |
| | (West Germany) Henning Hagenbauer | DNQ | | | | | | | | | | | 0 |
| | (West Germany) Georg Lorenz | DNQ | | | | | | | | | | | 0 |
guest drivers ineligible to score points
| | (Argentina) Oscar Larrauri | 1 | | | | | | | | | | | 0 |
| | (France) Philippe Alliot | 2 | | | | | | | | | | | 0 |
| | (Netherlands) Michael Bleekemolen | | | | | | | | 2 | | | | 0 |
| | (Belgium) Didier Theys | 11 | | | | | | | 3 | | | | 0 |
| | (France) Alain Ferté | 3 | | | | | | | | | | | 0 |
| | (France) Jean-Louis Schlesser | 4 | | | | | | | | | | | 0 |
| | (Sweden) Thorbjörn Carlsson | | 4 | | | | | 4 | | | | | 0 |
| | (Sweden) Thomas Kaiser | | 5 | | | | | 6 | | | | | 0 |
| | (Italy) Mauro Baldi | **5** | | | | | | | | | | | 0 |
| | (Switzerland) Hanspeter Kaufmann | | | | | | | | 12 | 6 | | 7 | 0 |
| | (France) Denis Morin | 8 | | | | | | | | | | | 0 |
| | (Italy) Fabio Mancini | 9 | | | | | | | | | | | 0 |
| | (Switzerland) Pierre-Alain Lombardi | | | | | | | | 11 | | | | 0 |
| | (France) Pascal Fabre | 14 | | | | | | | | | | | 0 |
| | (Switzerland) Fredy Eschenmoser | | | | | | | | 14 | | | | 0 |
| | (Italy) Ignazio Rizza | 22 | | | | | | | | 15 | | | 0 |
| | (Switzerland) Jo Zeller | Ret | | | | | | | | | | | 0 |
| | (France) Philippe Streiff | Ret | | | | | | | | | | | 0 |
| | (Switzerland) Jakob Bordoli | Ret | | | | | | | | | | | 0 |
| | (Italy) Emanuele Pirro | Ret | | | | | | | | | | | 0 |
| | (Belgium) Hubert de Spiegelaere | | | | | | | | Ret | | | | 0 |
| Pos | Driver | NÜR1 (West Germany) | NÜR2 (West Germany) | WUN (West Germany) | ERD (West Germany) | SAL (Austria) | NÜR3 (West Germany) | DIE (West Germany) | ZOL (Belgium) | HOC (West Germany) | SIE (West Germany) | NÜR4 (West Germany) | Points |

| Colour | Result |
|---|---|
| Gold | Winner |
| Silver | Second place |
| Bronze | Third place |
| Green | Points classification |
| Blue | Non-points classification |
| Blue | Non-classified finish (NC) |
| Purple | Retired, not classified (Ret) |
| Red | Did not qualify (DNQ) |
| Red | Did not pre-qualify (DNPQ) |
| Black | Disqualified (DSQ) |
| White | Did not start (DNS) |
| White | Withdrew (WD) |
| White | Race cancelled (C) |
| Blank | Did not practice (DNP) |
| Blank | Did not arrive (DNA) |
| Blank | Excluded (EX) |

**Bold** – Pole
Italics – Fastest Lap
