= Lola Horag HSB =

- Category: Sports 2000/Interserie Division II
- Constructor: Lola Cars

Technical specifications
- Engine: Volkswagen-Audi Group (VAG) 1,786 cc (109.0 cu in) I4, turbocharged, mid-mounted
- Transmission: 5-speed manual
- Power: 603 hp (450 kW); 400 N⋅m (295 lb⋅ft)
- Weight: 565 kg (1,245.6 lb)
- Tyres: Avon; Dunlop

Competition history
- Notable entrants: Walter Lechner Racing School; Horag Hotz Racing
- Notable drivers: Walter Lechner
- Debut: 1991 Interserie Brands Hatch
Races	Wins	Podiums
65 (66 entries)	5	27

The Lola Horag HSB, also known as the Lola Horag VAG Can-Am Turbo, or simply as the Lola Horag, was a sports prototype race car, originally designed and built by Lola, as the open-wheel Lola T88/50 Formula 3000 race car, for the International Formula 3000 Championship in 1988, but later further developed into a sports prototype race car, for the European-based Interserie championship, in 1991.
