= Walter Lechner =

Austrian racing driver and pilot (1949–2020)

Walter Lechner Sr.
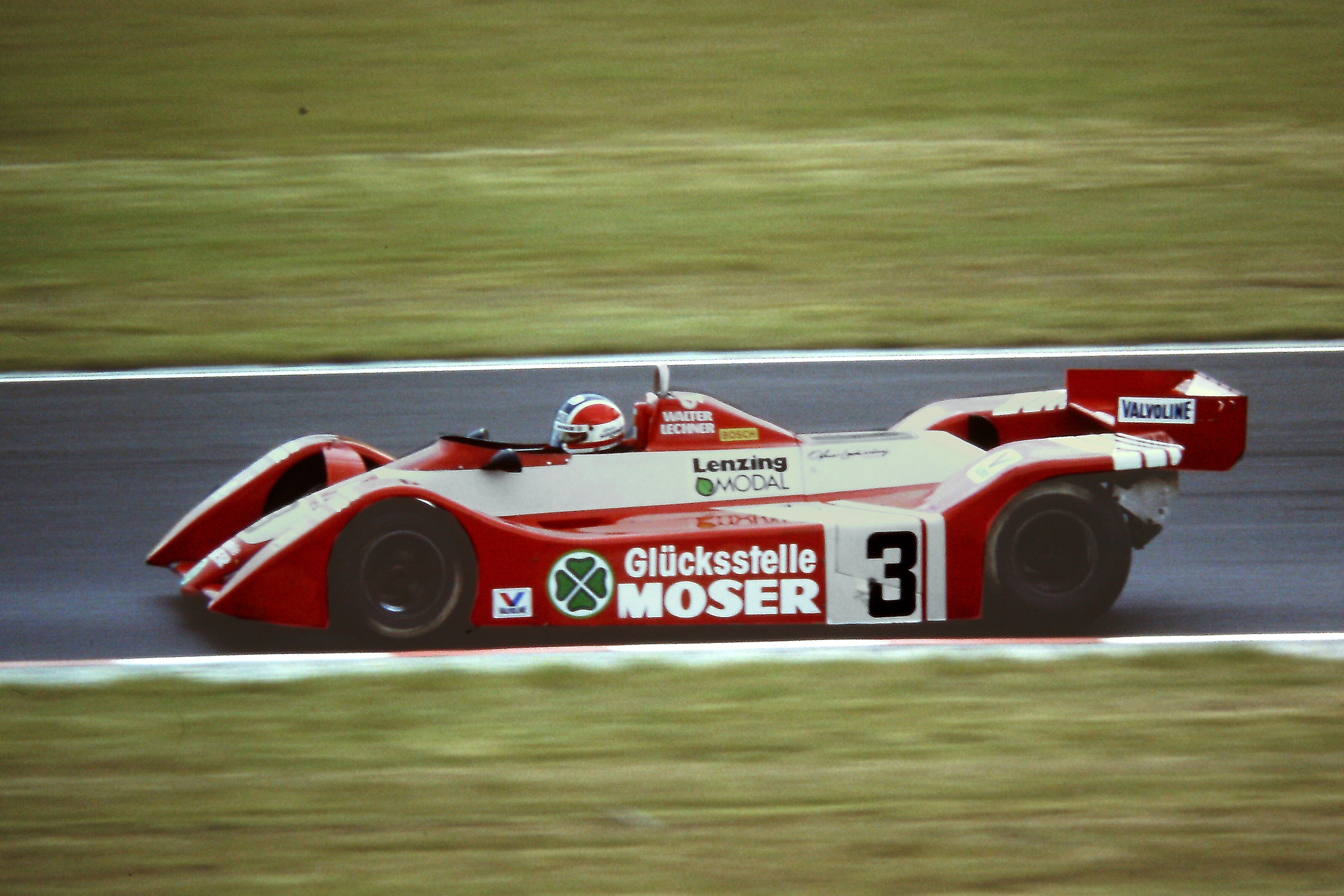
- Born: 4 August 1949; St. Pölten, Austria
- Died: 8 December 2020 (aged 71); Vienna, Austria
- Occupations: Racing driver, pilot

Walter Lechner senior (4 August 1949 – 8 December 2020) was an Austrian entrepreneur, motorsport team principal, and automobile racing driver and pilot born in St. Pölten. He was the founder of Lechner Racing and the father of racing drivers Robert Lechner and Walter Lechner Jr., who both achieved international success in motorsport.

== Biography ==
Lechner originally began his professional career training as a waiter apprentice and working as a disc jockey before pursuing motorsport full-time. In 1975, he laid the foundation for his racing career by attending a course at the Jim Russell Racing Drivers School based at the Salzburgring. In 1979, he established his long-term cornerstone business, the Walter Lechner Racing School. Aside from instructing, he operated successfully as a tire importer and motorsport team owner. In 1975, he officially established his racing team footprint with the launch of Lechner Racing.

His racing school and team became the Start for premier road racing talents. Lechner personally trained, managed, or supported future Formula One standouts, including Germany's Stefan Bellof, Austria's Karl Wendlinger, and future Mercedes-AMG F1 Team Principal Toto Wolff.

His racing team entered the international Porsche Supercup in 2003, a support series held during Grand Prix race weekends. Under his management, the team went on to become the most successful squad in Porsche Supercup history, capturing 11 team titles—including seven consecutive titles—and securing eight drivers' titles with stars like René Rast. Furthermore, Lechner was deeply involved in expanding the brand globally, organizing and running the Porsche Sprint Challenge Middle East starting from November each year. The peak of this dominance was marked by achieving both the Drivers' and Teams' championship titles simultaneously during the 2005, 2010, 2011, and 2012 seasons.

On 3 April 2019, Lechner was honored with the Leonidas Lifetime Achievement Award, which was presented to him by his close friend and former racing driver Hans-Joachim Stuck.

Lechner passed away on 8 December 2020 at the age of 71 following a short, severe illness.

== Racing career ==
Lechner enjoyed a professional competitive racing career spanning nearly two decades. Characterized as a "late starter," he immediately showed pace by winning the Formula Ford European Championship in 1978. In 1979, he contested the German Formula 3 Championship in a Ralt, finishing third overall in the final standings. By 1982, he secured both the European and German championship titles in the Formula Super Vee series. Throughout his formula and sports car racing ventures, his vehicles prominently sported the branding of American bourbon maker Jim Beam, forming one of the longest-standing commercial partnerships in Austrian motorsport. This iconic, long-term commercial partnership with Jim Beam took full effect during his successful Formula Super Vee championship campaign in 1982.

From 1983 onward, Lechner shifted focus to sports car racing, where he achieved six championship victories in the Interserie Sportwagen Cup. His first title in 1983 was taken utilizing a former Grand Prix March 821 Formula One car that he custom-fitted with closed-wheel bodywork. He followed this up by campaigning a converted Williams FW07C-Ford.

Lechner celebrated his most notable driving triumphs alongside Porsche. In 1985, he won an upset victory at the Österreichring during his first-ever outing in a rented Porsche 956. This performance prompted him to purchase its successor, a Porsche 962C, in 1986. Over an exceptional six-year racing span with the chassis, he captured 11 individual race victories and two additional Interserie championships.

Lechner also competed in the North American Can-Am Championship in 1984, steering high-horsepower prototypes to a 5th-place finish overall in the championship standings. He made two appearances at the prestigious 24 Hours of Le Mans in 1988 and 1989 driving Group C machinery for Walter Brun's team. After transitioning to touring cars, he won the Austrian Touring Car Championship in 1995 against veteran racer Dieter Quester. He retired from active racing in 1996 to focus entirely on guiding the racing careers of his sons.

== Racing record ==
=== 24 Hours of Le Mans results ===
Year	Team	Co-Drivers	Car	Class	Laps	Pos.	Class Pos.
1988	(Switzerland) Brun Motorsport	(West Germany) Manuel Reuter (Switzerland) Franz Hunkeler	Porsche 962C	C1	111	DNF	DNF
1989	(Switzerland) Brun Motorsport	(Austria) Roland Ratzenberger (Brazil) Maurizio Sala	Porsche 962C	C1	58	DNF	DNF

=== Complete World Sportscar Championship results ===
(key) (Races in bold indicate pole position; races in italics indicate fastest lap)

Season	Team	Car	1	2	3	4	5	6	7	8	9	10	11
1983	Kannacher GT	URD C83	MON	SIL	NÜR	LEM	SPA; DNF	FUJ	KYA				
1985	Gebhardt Motorsport	Gebhardt JC842 / JC843	MUG	MON; 13	SIL	LEM	HOK; DNF	MOS	SPA	BRH	FUJ	SEL; DNF	
1986	Gebhardt Motorsport	Gebhardt JC853	MON	SIL	LEM	NÜN	BRH	JER	NÜR; 6	SPA	FUJ		
1987	Günther Gebhardt	Gebhardt JC873	JAR	JER	MON	SIL	LEM	NÜN	BRH	NÜR; DNF	SPA	FUJ	
1988	Brun Motorsport / Lechner Racing	Porsche 962C	JER	JAR	MON	SIL	LEM; DNF	BRÜ	BRH	NÜR; DNF	SPA	FUJ	SAN
1989	Team Salamin / Brun Motorsport	Porsche 962C	SUZ	DIJ; 12	JAR; 9	BRH	NÜR	DON	SPA	MEX			

=== Interserie career highlights ===
The following table summarizes Walter Lechner's primary final standings and championship years across both divisions of the Interserie.

Season	Team	Car	Division	Wins	Points	Pos.
1982	(West Germany) Weigel-Renntechnik	March 802 Can-Am	Division II	0	—	NC
1983	(Austria) EMCO Sports Team	March 821 Can-Am	Division I	2	91	**1st**
1984	(Austria) Walter Lechner Racing School	March 821 / Williams FW07C	Division I	0	—	NC
1985	(Austria) Walter Lechner Racing School	March 821 / Porsche 956	Division I	1	45	6th
1986	(Austria) Team Lechner Racing School	March 821 / Porsche 956	Division I	0	27	11th
1987	(Austria) Walter Lechner Racing School	Porsche 962C	Division I	2	70	**1st**
1988	(Austria) Walter Lechner Racing School	Porsche 962C	Division I	1	52	4th
1989	(Austria) Walter Lechner Racing School	Porsche 962C	Division I	4	95	**1st**
1990	(Austria) Walter Lechner Racing School	Porsche 962C	Division I	1	67	**2nd**
1991	(Austria) Walter Lechner Racing School	Lechner Spyder SC91 Judd	Division I	0	35	4th
1992	(Austria) Walter Lechner Racing School	Lola Horag	Division II	2	—	**2nd**
1994	(Austria) Walter Lechner Racing School	Lola Horag	Division II	3	—	**1st**
