= Porsche 962 =

Prototype racing car

- A 1988 Porsche 962 taken at the Hampton Court Concours 2025.
- Category: Group C, IMSA GTP, Le Mans Prototype (Note: GTi version in 1994 24 Hours of Le Mans by ADA Engineering)
- Constructor: Porsche
- Designer: Norbert Singer
- Predecessor: Porsche 956
- Successor: Porsche WSC-95

Technical specifications
- Chassis: Aluminum monocoque
- Engine: Various Porsche KKK turbocharged flat-sixes rear-mid mounted
- Transmission: 5-speed manual transmission or dual-clutch transmission with limited-slip differential
- Fuel: Various
- Tyres: Dunlop; Goodyear; Yokohama

Competition history
- Notable entrants: (Germany) Porsche AG; (Germany) Joest Racing; (Germany) Kremer Racing; (Germany) Blaupunkt; (Switzerland) Brun Motorsport; (Japan) Schuppan
- Notable drivers: Placeholder: (United States) Mario Andretti; (United States) Michael Andretti; (United States) Al Holbert; (United States) Hurley Haywood; (United States) John Andretti; (Germany) Hans-Joachim Stuck; (Germany) Stefan Bellof; (Germany) Jochen Mass; (Germany) Klaus Ludwig; (Germany) Manuel Reuter; (Germany) Louis Krages (Note: Krages raced under the pseudonym John Winter.); (Germany) Otto Altenbach; (Germany) Ronny Meixner; (Germany) Frank Jelinski; (Australia) Vern Schuppan; (Australia) Gary Brabham; (United Kingdom) Tiff Needell; (United Kingdom) Derek Bell; (United Kingdom) Jonathan Palmer; (United Kingdom) Johnny Dumfries; (Switzerland) Walter Brun; (Switzerland) Marc Surer; (Switzerland) Loris Kessel; (Spain) Jesús Pareja; (Italy) Gianpiero Moretti; (France) Henri Pescarolo; (France) Bob Wollek; (France) Franz Konrad
- Debut: 1984 24 Hours of Daytona
- Constructors' Championships: 21

The Porsche 962 is a sports prototype racing car designed and built by Porsche. Created to replace the Porsche 956, the 962 was introduced at the end of 1984 and replaced the 956 in the IMSA's GTP class in 1985 due to regulation changes obsoleting the 956. It was also introduced in the World Sportscar Championship's Group C category in 1984. Over its decade-long career, the car in its Group C form won the 24 Hours of Le Mans twice, with a derivative of the car, the Dauer 962 Le Mans, winning a further title in 1994. In total, the 962 scored nineteen total constructor's championships across various series. The 962's successor was the Porsche WSC-95, introduced for the 1996 24 Hours of Le Mans, but did not receive factory backing or support.

== Development ==
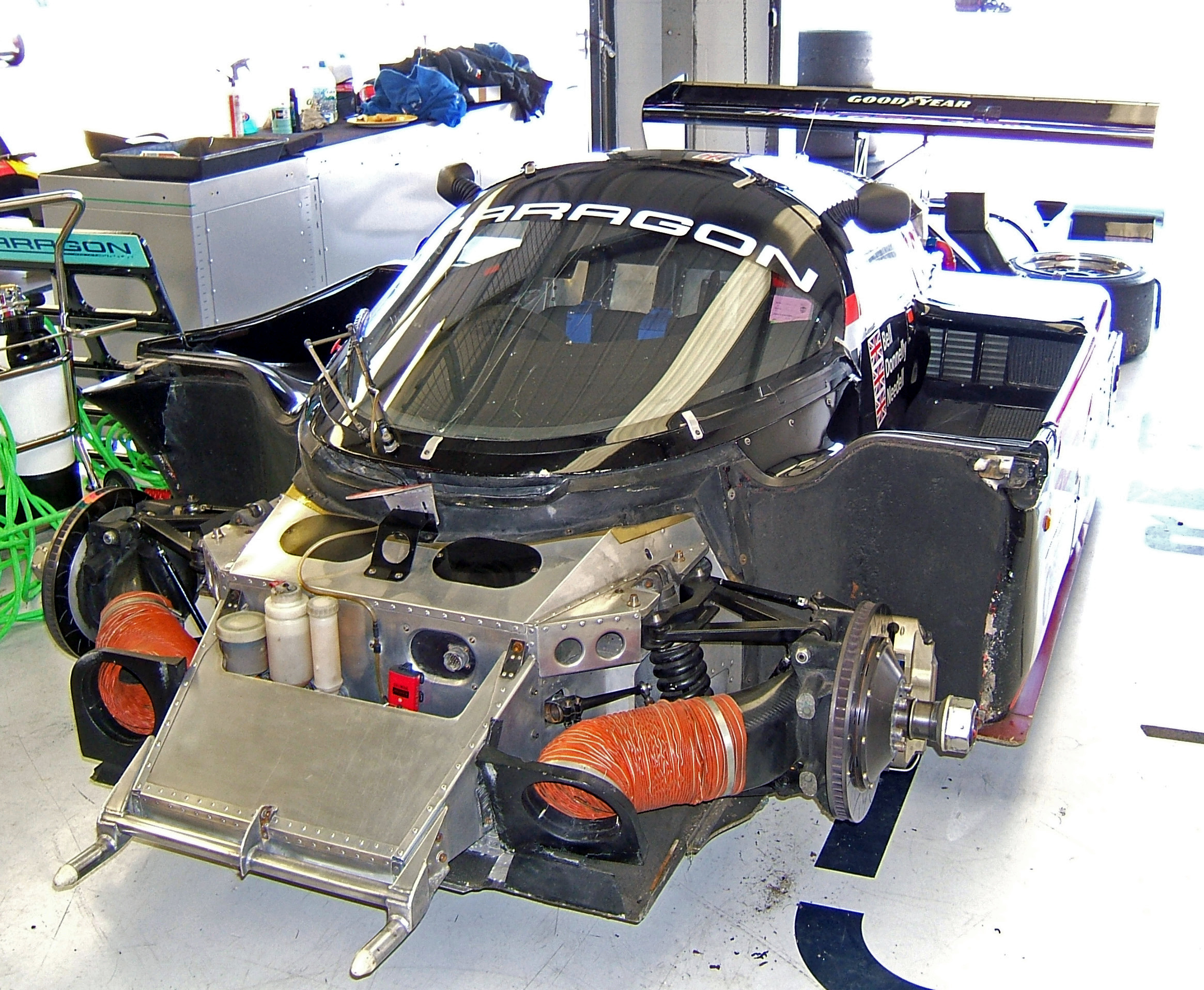
The front end of an RLR-Porsche 962C GTi chassis.

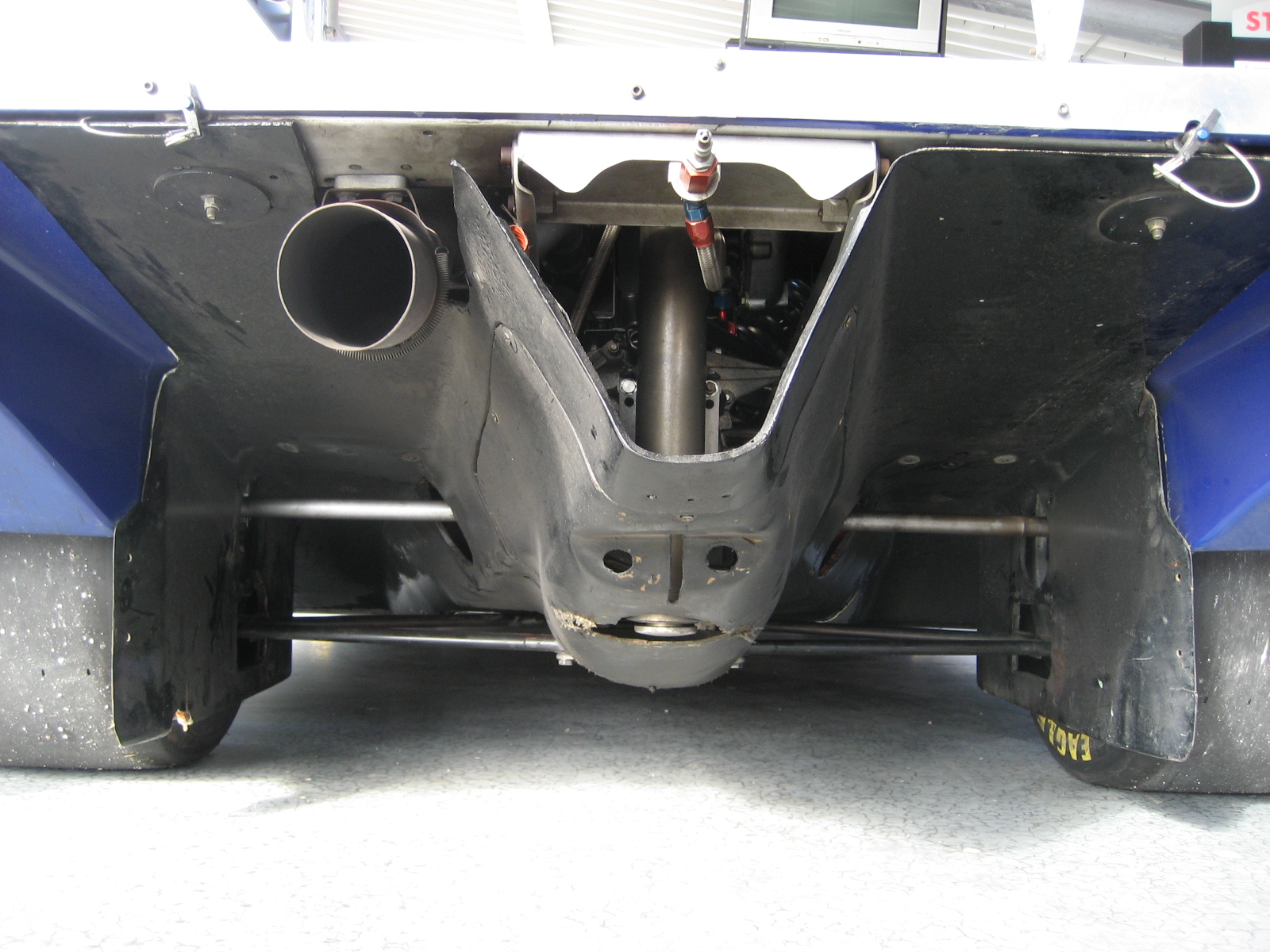
The rear diffuser of an IMSA-spec 962. The exhaust pipe and rear suspension are within the Venturi tunnels, while the gearbox and airjacks are in the center shroud.

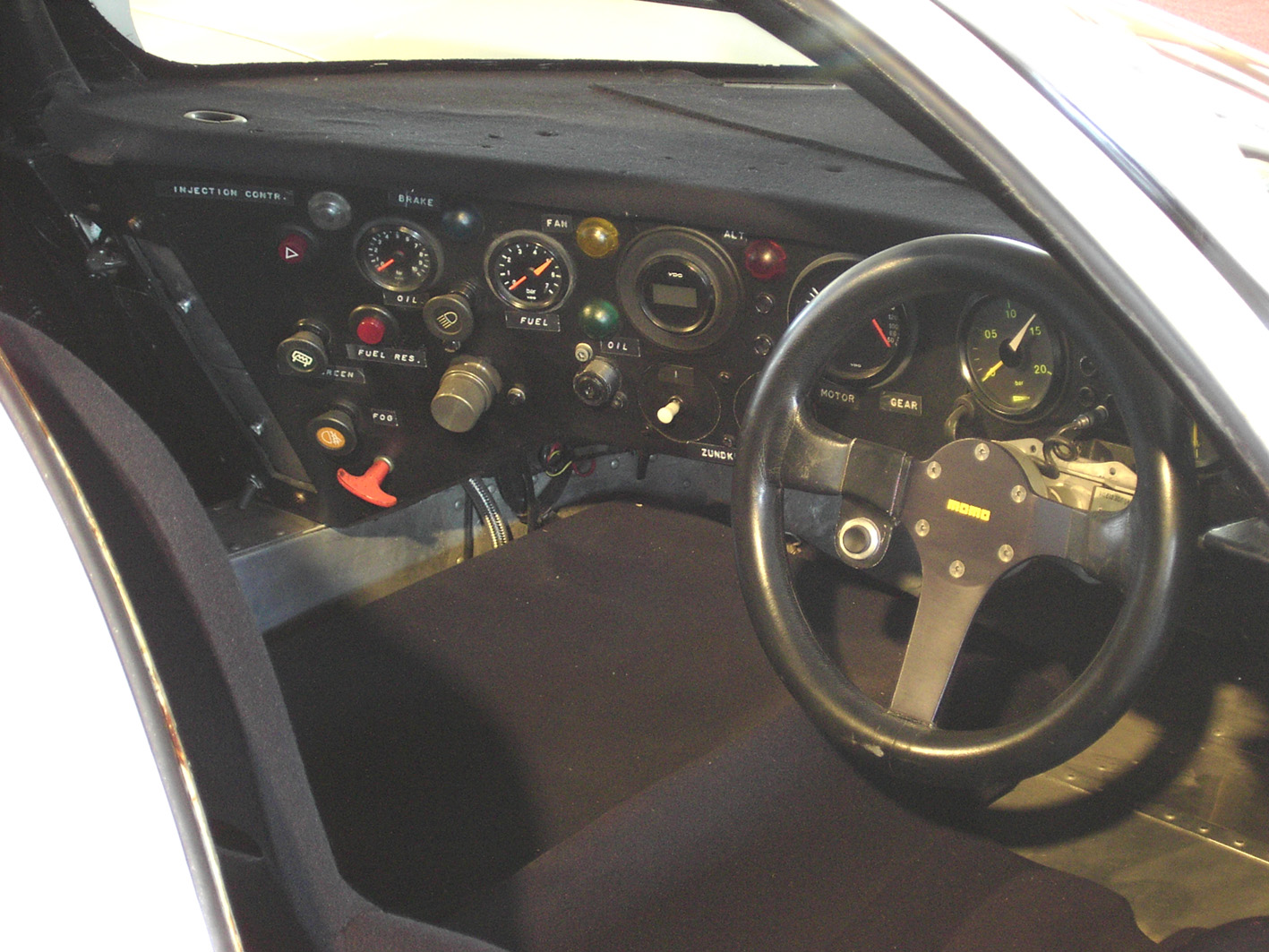
An early 962 cockpit.

When the Porsche 956 was developed in late 1981, the intention of Porsche was to run the car in both the World Sportscar Championship and the North American IMSA GTP Championship. However IMSA GTP regulations differed from Group C and subsequently the 956 chassis was banned in the US series on safety grounds as the driver's feet were ahead of the front axle center line. In addition, when running under IMSA rules, the water-cooled twin-turbo of the 956 had to be replaced with the older and simpler air-cooled single turbo engines until a compromise was found.

To make the 956 eligible under the new IMSA regulations, Porsche extended the 956's wheelbase to move the front wheels ahead of the pedal box. A steel roll cage was also integrated into the new aluminium chassis. For an engine, the Porsche 934-derived Type-935 2.8L flat-6 was used with air cooling and a single Kühnle, Kopp und Kausch AG K36 turbocharger instead of the twin K27 turbochargers of the Group C 956, as twin-turbo systems were not allowed in IMSA's GTP class at the time.

The newer Andial built 3.2L fuel injected flat-6 would be placed in the 962 by the middle of 1985 for IMSA GT, which made the car more competitive against Jaguar. However it would not be until 1986 that the 2.6L unit from the 956 was replaced in the World Sportscar Championship, using 2.8L, 3.0L, and 3.2L variants with dual turbochargers. The cars run under World Sportscar Championship regulations were designated as 962C to separate them from their IMSA GTP counterparts. The 3.2L unit, which had been eligible under IMSA's Group 3 engine rules, was banned by IMSA in 1987. In 1988, to counteract against the factory Nissans and the threat of withdrawal from Porsche teams, water-cooled twin-turbo Porsche engines would be allowed back but with 36 mm restrictors.

In total, Porsche would produce 91 962s between 1984 and 1991. 16 were officially used by the factory team, while 75 were sold to customers. Some 956s were rebuilt as 962s, with two being previously written off and four others simply rebuilt. Three 962s that were badly damaged were also rebuilt and had been given a new chassis number due to the extensive reconstruction. Due to the high demand for 962 parts, some aluminium chassis were built by Fabcar in the United States before being shipped to Germany for completion. Derek Bell, a 5-time Le Mans winner, drove the 962 to 21 victories between 1985 and 1987, remarked that it was "a fabulous car, but considering how thorough Norbert Singer (the designer of the 962 and head of Porsche's motorsport division at the time) and the team were, it was really quite easy to drive."

=== Modifications ===
Due to the sheer numbers of 962s, some teams took it upon themselves to adapt the car to better suit their needs or to remain competitive. These modifications included new bodywork for better aerodynamic efficiency, while others changed mechanical elements. Long-time Porsche campaigner Joest Racing heavily modified a pair of 962s for the IMSA GTP Championship in 1993 to better compete against Jaguar, taking the 962's final sprint race victory (Road America) that season.

=== Privately built 962s ===
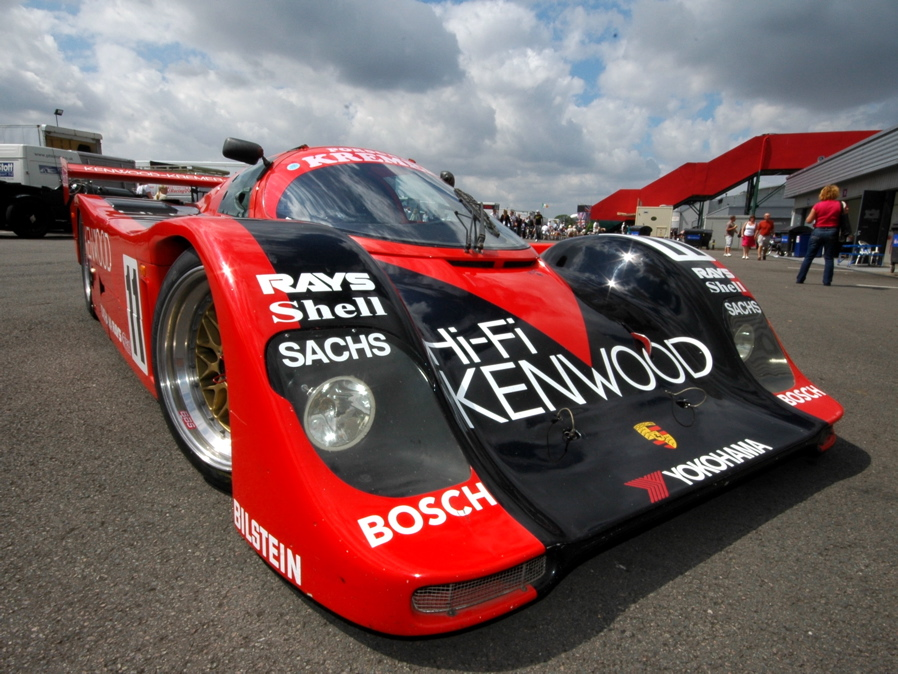
A Kremer 962CK6.

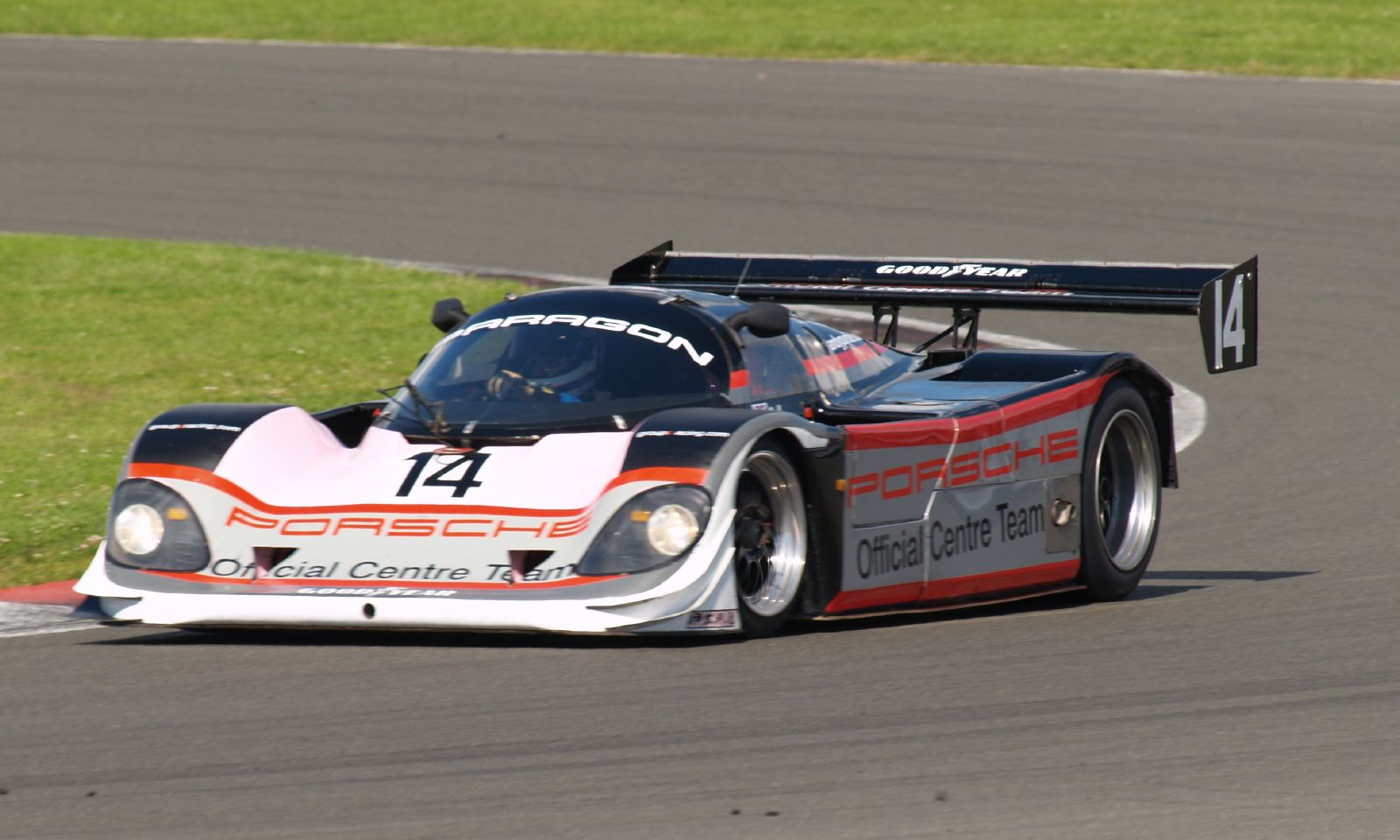
A Richard Lloyd 962C GTi.

Beyond minor modification, some private teams reengineered the entire car. One noted problem of the 962 was a lack of stiffness in the aluminium chassis, which led some teams to design a new chassis, and then buy components from Porsche to complete the car. Some custom cars also had unique bodywork. Some teams would then offer their 962s to other customer teams.

Among the most popular privately built 962s was that from Kremer Racing, named the "962 CK6", which did away with the original aluminium sheet tub of the original Porsche chassis, replacing it with a carbon fibre tub. Eleven chassis were built, campaigned by Kremer and other teams. John Thompson designed a chassis for Brun Motorsport, eight of which were built and helped the team take second in the World Sportscar Championship in 1987. Thompson would later build two chassis for Obermaier Racing. Richard Lloyd Racing's GTI Engineering would turn to Peter Stevens and Nigel Stroud to develop five 962C GTis, which featured entirely revised aero and aluminium honeycomb rather than sheet tubs. Former factory Porsche driver Vern Schuppan would also build five new chassis, some known as "TS962s".

In the United States, the ball got rolling when Holbert Racing began making modifications to their own chassis and rebadging them with "962 HR-" serial numbers. The search was always on for a stiffer and safer 962 monocoque and Jim Busby contracted Jim Chapman to build a more robust version of the 962 monocoque. Fabcar would become the de facto factory tub supplier, supplying chassis with official Porsche serial numbers. Fabcar incorporated changes to the factory tub, replacing the simple sheet aluminium construction with a combination of sheet aluminium and aluminium honeycomb in addition to billet aluminium bulkheads. These changes substantially increased the tub's crashworthiness and stiffness. Dyson Racing purchased a Richard Lloyd Racing / GTi Engineering 962 monocoque for use in their Porsche 962 DR-1 chassis. A Fabcar tub was used in Dyson's Porsche 962 DR-2.

Some 962s were even more extensively modified, with several open-cockpit versions being developed in the mid-1990s to run under new sportscar regulations. Kevin Jeanette built the Gunnar 966, mimicking elements from the 917/30 Can-Am cars. Kremer Racing would once again develop their own chassis, with the open-cockpit CK7 running in Interserie and K8 running at most international sportscar races, including Le Mans and Daytona. These cars shared little with the original 962s, using custom bodywork and chassis designs, yet retaining the engine and some suspension elements. Heinz-Jörgen Dahmen converted his 962 (chassis 011) to an open-top version that he raced in the Interserie in 1995 and 1996. The car had previously been campaigned by him in the Interserie since 1990.

== Racing history ==
Porsche debuted the 962 at the 1984 24 Hours of Daytona with Mario and Michael Andretti driving the factory car which led the race until it retired during lap 127 with engine and gearbox problems. The first 962 to appear at Le Mans and indeed in Europe was also in 1984 when American Preston Henn entered one in the IMSA GTP class. The car, driven by Henn, Michel Ferté and Edgar Dören, was classified in 26th position despite their race ending after 247 laps with ignition failure.

For 1985, the 962C would debut in the World Sportscar Championship, but ironically the car lost to an older 956, which had already taken WEC top-honors four times. Under pressure from new cars from Jaguar and Mercedes-Benz, in 1987 Porsche again brought in a new engine, a more durable and powerful 3.0 L unit which powered the car to an overall win at the 1987 24 Hours of Le Mans, Porsche's record seventh consecutive victory at the race.

After a post-'87 "dry spell", Porsche customer Jochen Dauer got the 962 re-classified as a road legal GT1 car under a loophole in the new ACO regulations for the 1994 24 Hours of Le Mans.

=== Achievements ===
During the early years of its career, the 962, like the 917K, 935 and 956 before it, became one of the most dominant cars in motorsport, and its efficiency and reliability led it to be a car much in demand among private teams. The championships won by teams campaigning the 962 included the World Sportscar Championship title in 1985 and 1986, the IMSA GT Championship every year from 1985 to 1988, the Interserie championship from 1987 until 1992, all four years of the ADAC Supercup series (1986 to 1989), and the All Japan Sports Prototype Championship from 1985 until 1989, and it was also very dominant in the American IMSA series well into the 90's. The 962 also won the 24 Hours of Le Mans in 1986 and 1987, with Derek Bell, Al Holbert and Hans-Joachim Stuck at the wheel on both occasions, as well as later winning under the Dauer 962 badge in 1994.

The presence of strong factory teams, such as Jaguar, Mercedes-Benz, Nissan, and Toyota, competing against privateer 962s eventually led to the car becoming less successful in the later 1980s. Even though they struggled, 962s would continue to win races into 1993, taking lone victories in the IMSA GT and Interserie seasons. Although Dauer's Le Mans victory in 1994 featured a highly modified car, Team Taisan would take the final victory ever in an original 962C, winning an All Japan Grand Touring Car Championship event at Fuji Speedway in August of that year, just over ten years after the car had debuted.

== Road versions ==
Towards the end of the car's competition life, a number of privateer teams and tuners began converting 962s for road use. The concept was that the 962, which had performed so well on the track, would be ideally suited as a supercar for the road. An almost standard car was registered (BB-PW 962) and briefly driven on the road for a German magazine, although the original headlight height and underbody configuration rendered the car illegal under German regulations.

The first company outside Porsche to modify a 962 into a road car was Koenig Specials, a German tuner who had previously raced 962s. Known as the C62, the car was completed in 1991 and featured entirely new bodywork in order to better adapt to German regulations. The engine was expanded to 3.4L and saw the addition of a newer Motronic system. It is unknown how many were built by Koenig.

German tuner DP Motorsports completed a road conversion in 1992, with a total of three cars, known as DP62s, built upon existing 962 racing chassis. Modifications included moving the headlights higher to meet German legal requirements, plus the addition of a 3.3 L twin-turbo flat-6.

In 1991 Vern Schuppan created his Schuppan 962CR for Japanese customers, with a list price of 195 million Yen, or UK£830,000. The bodywork and chassis were completely new and unique, designed by Mike Simcoe of GM Holden in Australia, but the engine was taken directly from 962s, although it was also expanded to 3.3 litres. An unknown number were built before funding failed to materialize. Before the run of CRs, however, at least two 962R (or LM) cars were built. The first, UK-registered H726 LDP, was little-modified from its race days. 962/123 raced at Le Mans in 1988 and was in Schuppan's workshop when the decision was made to convert it to road use. A decal on the nose read "962R Le Mans Prototype", although the car is often referred to as a 962LM. It differed from many of the street versions in having a British-built aluminium honeycomb chassis. The 962R featured in a number of UK and Australian magazines in summer 1991.

Jochen Dauer used the original racing chassis for his GT1 version of the 962, the Dauer 962 Le Mans, both for road and race use. The bodywork was all new, yet retained many elements from the original 962s. However, unlike the previous road cars, Dauer took the 962 to race at Le Mans once again. With assistance from Porsche and using a loophole in the rules for the 1994 24 Hours of Le Mans, Dauer successfully raced his modified 962 to an overall race win.

A run of Derek Bell edition 962 road cars was planned, but only one was completed, powered by a 580 bhp (430 kW) engine from the 993 GT2. It was on sale and complete with the rights to continue the run in 2007.
