= Interserie =

Racing Series

Interserie is the name of a European-based motorsport series started in 1970 that allows for a wide variety of racing cars from various eras and series to compete with less limited rules than in other series.

Created in 1970 by German Gerhard Härle, it is inspired by English races of the 1960s for Group 7 machinery and by the Nordic Challenge Cup which had run in 1969 in Finland and Sweden. Initially using the Group 7 formula similar to that used by Can-Am in North America, the series would evolve to include open-wheel cars with sports-car style full bodywork from CART, Formula One, Formula 3000, Formula 3 and various other series, as well as Group C sports cars.

Although the teams are not as limitless in their modifications or powerplants, the series continues to run today, mostly with various open-wheel cars without full bodywork that became obsolete in current championship series.

Starting from 1999, the Interserie lost its international status and became a Central European championship with sprint races organised by the Automobilclub von Deutschland, mostly for modified formula cars.

== Champions ==
Year	Overall Champion			
1970	(Germany) Jürgen Neuhaus			
1971	(Finland) Leo Kinnunen			
1972	(Finland) Leo Kinnunen			
1973	(Finland) Leo Kinnunen			
1974	(Switzerland) Herbert Müller			
1975	(Switzerland) Herbert Müller			
1976	(Switzerland) Herbert Müller			
1977	(Germany) Helmut Bross			
1978	(Germany) Reinhold Joest			
1979	(Germany) Kurt Lotterschmid			
1980	(Germany) Kurt Lotterschmid			
1981	(Germany) Roland Binder			
1982	(Germany) Roland Binder			
1983	(Austria) Walter Lechner			
1984	(Germany) Klaus Niedzwiedz			
1985	(Germany) Roland Binder			
	Div. I		Div. II	
1986	(Germany) "John Winter"		(Germany) Roland Binder	
1987	(Austria) Walter Lechner		(Austria) Karl Hasenbichler	
1988	(Germany) Jochen Dauer		(Germany) Rolf Götz	
1989	(Austria) Walter Lechner		(Germany) Rolf Götz	
1990	(Germany) Bernd Schneider		(Germany) Rolf Götz	
1991	(Germany) Bernd Schneider		(Austria) Karl Hasenbichler	
1992	(Germany) Manuel Reuter		(Austria) Karl Hasenbichler	
1993	(Italy) Giovanni Lavaggi		(Italy) Ranieri Randaccio	
1994	(Sweden) Johan Rajamäki		(Austria) Walter Lechner	
	Div. I		Div. II	Div. III
1995	(Germany) Karl-Heinz Becker		(Austria) Walter Lechner	(Canada) Robbie Stirling
	Div. I		Div. II	
1996	(Canada) Robbie Stirling		(Austria) Walter Lechner	
1997	(Austria) Josef Neuhauser		(Germany) Joachim Ryschka	
	Div. I		Div. II	Div. III
1998	(Austria) Josef Neuhauser		(Germany) Alfred Guldi	(Germany) Martin Krisam Jr.
1999	(Czech Republic) Jaromír Zdražil		(Czech Republic) Vlasto Matouš	(Germany) [[Karl-Heinz Becker]]
2000	(Austria) Rolf-Thorsten Dietrich		(Germany) Frank Schierig	(Austria) Josef Neuhauser
2001	(Austria) Christoph Haingartner		(Luxembourg) Christian Hauser	(Austria) Josef Neuhauser
2002	(Austria) Rolf-Thorsten Dietrich		(Switzerland) Jean-Claude Monbaron	(Austria) Walter Leitgeb
	Div. II		Div. III	Div. IV
2003	(Austria) Rolf-Thorsten Dietrich		(Switzerland) Jean-Claude Monbaron	(Austria) Walter Leitgeb
2004	(Austria) Peter Milavec		(Germany) Thomas Wolfert	(Germany) Hans-Peter Voigt
	Div. I	Div. II	Div. III	Div. IV
2005	(Switzerland) Sabrina Hungerbühler	(Germany) Hans-Peter Voigt	(Austria) Peter Milavec	(Germany) Marcel Baierle
	Div. II		Div. III	Div. IV
2006	(Germany) Hans-Peter Voigt		(Austria) Peter Milavec	(Germany) Marek Schramm
	Div. I		Div. II	Div. III
2007	(Austria) Peter Milavec		(Germany) Marcel Baierle	(Germany) Hans-Peter Voigt
2008	(Austria) Peter Milavec		(Germany) Thomas Conrad	(Germany) Hans-Peter Voigt
	Div. I	Div. II	Div. III	Div. IV
2009	(Germany) Peter Randlshofer	(Germany) Dr. Thomas Keller	no champion	(Germany) Lars Erichson

== Bibliography ==
- Christian Naviaux : Intersérie, "les Big Bangers" ou la Can-Am européenne, 1970–1975. Éditions du Palmier, Nîmes, 2012 (in French). ISBN 978-2-36059-023-0.
