= List of Reynard Motorsport cars =

This is a list of cars produced by Reynard Motorsport.

Green	Cars built by Fulmar Competition Services

Year	Car	Picture	Class	Nr. built
1973	Reynard 73FF		Formula Ford 1600	1
1975	Reynard 75FF		Formula Ford 1600	1
1975	Reynard 75SF	Reynard 75SF in Classic Days Düsseldorf 2022	Formula Ford 2000	4
1976	Reynard 76FF		Formula Ford 1600	5
1976	Reynard 76SF		Formula Ford 2000	1
1977	Reynard 77SF		Formula Ford 2000	16
1978	Reynard 78SF		Formula Ford 2000	23
1979	Reynard 79SF		Formula Ford 2000	18
1979	Reynard 79SV		Formula Super Vee	1
1980	Reynard 80SF		Formula Ford 2000	11
1980	Reynard 80SV		Formula Super Vee	1
1981	Reynard 81SF		Formula Ford 2000	6
1982	Reynard 82FF		Formula Ford 1600	44
1982	Reynard 82SF		Formula Ford 2000	1
1983	Reynard 83FF	Reynard 83FF	Formula Ford 1600	39
1983	Reynard 83SF		Formula Ford 2000	42
1984	Reynard 84FF	Reynard 84FF	Formula Ford 1600	68
1984	Reynard 84SF		Formula Ford 2000	70
1984	Reynard 84FTF		Formula Turbo Ford	1
1985	Reynard 85FF		Formula Ford 1600	66
1985	Reynard 85SF	Michael Kahnt in his Reynard 85SF	Formula Ford 2000	32
1985	Reynard 853		Formula Three	24
1986	Reynard 86FF		Formula Ford 1600	16
1986	Reynard 86SF		Formula Ford 2000	31
1986	Reynard 863		Formula Three	20
1987	87FF		Formula Ford 1600	10
1987	Reynard 87SF		Formula Ford 2000	70
1987	Reynard 873		Formula Three	59
1988	Reynard 88FF		Formula Ford 1600	25
1988	Reynard 88SF		Formula Ford 2000	70
1988	Reynard FVL Mk. I		Formula Vauxhall Lotus, EFDA Nations Cup	204
1988	Reynard 88S		Sports 2000	2
1988	Reynard 883		Formula Three	54
1988	Reynard 88D		Formula 3000, Formula Nippon	22
1989	Reynard 89FF		Formula Ford 1600	25
1989	Reynard 89SF		Formula Ford 2000	3
1989	Reynard 89FREN		Formula Renault	5
1989	Reynard 89S		Sports 2000	2
1989	Reynard 893		Formula Three	64
1989	Reynard 89D		Formula 3000, Formula Nippon	36
1989	Reynard 89H		Formula Atlantic	10
1990	Reynard 90FF		Formula Ford 1600	25
1990	Reynard 90SF		Formula Ford 2000	12
1990	Reynard MW001		Formula Mirage, Formula Reynard	46
1990	Reynard 90FREN		Formula Renault	6
1990	Reynard 90S		Sports 2000	2
1990	Reynard 903	Michael Schumacher's Reynard 903	Formula Three	102
1990	Reynard 90D		Formula 3000, Formula Nippon, Formula Holden	29
1990	Reynard 90H		Formula Atlantic	11
1991	Reynard 91FF		Formula Ford 1600	11
1991	Reynard 91FREN			3
1991	Lechner Spyder SC91		Interserie Division I (Can-Am)	
1991	Reynard 91D		Formula 3000, Formula Nippon, Formula Holden	30
1991	Reynard 913		Formula Three	36
1992	Reynard 91FF		Formula Ford 1600	3
1992	Reynard FVL Mk. II		Formula Vauxhall Lotus, EFDA Nations Cup	
1992	Reynard 923		Formula Three	26
1992	Reynard 92D	Reynard 92D Formula Holden driven by Bill Norman	Formula 3000, Formula Nippon, Formula Holden	38
1992	Reynard 92H		Formula Atlantic	10
1992	Schuppan 962CR	Schuppan 962CR	Roadgoing version of Porsche 962, carbon monocoque only	5
1993	Reynard 93D	David Coulthard's Reynard 93D	Formula 3000	
1993	Reynard 93H		Formula Atlantic	3
1993	Reynard 933		Formula Three	31
1994	Reynard 94D		Formula 3000, Formula Nippon, Formula Holden	28
1994	Reynard 94I		IndyCar	13
1994	Chrysler Patriot		Unraced LNG powered sportscar	3
1995	DAMS GD-01		DAMS unraced Formula 1 car	1
1995	Reynard 95D		Formula 3000, Formula Nippon, Formula Holden	11
1995	Reynard 95I	Jacques Villeneuve's Indy 500 winning Reynard 95i	CART, Indy Racing League	27
1996	Reynard 96D		Formula Nippon, Formula Holden	8
1996	Reynard 96I	Jimmy Vasser's Reynard 96i	CART	33
1996	Ford Indigo		Concept car	
1997	Reynard 97D		Formula Nippon, Formula Holden	
1997	Reynard 97I		CART	
1998	Reynard 98D		Formula Nippon, Formula Holden	
1998	Reynard 98E		Barber Dodge Pro Series	
1998	Reynard 98I	Bobby Rahal's Reynard 98i during his last year as a driver	CART	
1999	Reynard 99I		CART	
2000	Reynard R/T 2000		Skip Barber National Championship	
2000	Reynard 2KI	Gil de Ferran's Reynard 2KI	CART	
2000	Reynard 2KL		Formula Nippon	
2000	Reynard 2KQ		ALMS LMP675, 24 Hours of Le Mans LMP900	
2001	Reynard Formula Volkswagen		Formula Volkswagen South Africa	
2001	Reynard 2KF		Formula Chrysler Euroseries	
2001	Reynard 01I		CART	
2001	Reynard 01L	Reynard 01L converted into a hill climb racing car.	Formula Nippon	
2001	Reynard 01Q		ALMS LMP675, ELMS LMP675, FIA Sportscar Championship SR1	
2002	Reynard 02I		CART	
2002	Reynard 02S	Rebadged as the Creation 03S, here driven by Jamie Campbell-Walter at the 2005 1000km of Spa	Never raced under the Reynard banner	
Bankruptcy
2009	Reynard Inverter	The Reynard Inverter during testing at Silverstone	Trackday, 750 Motor Club Bike Sports	
