= 1986 FIA European Formula 3 Cup =

Race details
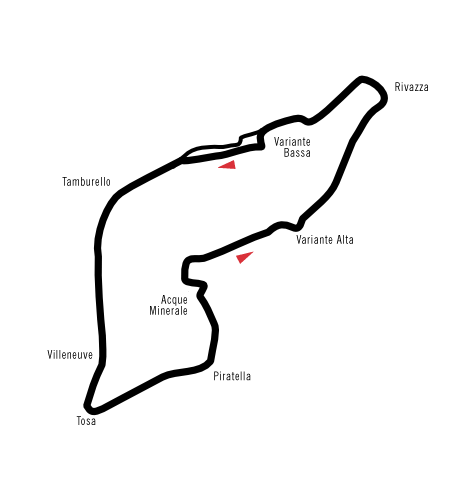
Date	26 October 1986
Official name	FIA European Formula Three Cup
Location	Imola, Emilia-Romagna, Italy
Course	Permanent racing facility 5.040 km (3.132 mi)
Distance	Race; 20 laps, 100.8 km (62.6 mi)
- Race

Pole Position
Driver	(Italy) Massimo Monti	Prema Racing
- 1:45.73

Fastest Lap
Driver	(Germany) Bernd Schneider	Team Sonax
- 2:09.53

Podium
First	(Italy) Stefano Modena	Euroteam
Second	(Italy) Alex Caffi	Venturini Racing
Third	(Italy) Nicola Larini	Enzo Coloni Racing

The 1986 FIA European Formula Three Cup was the second European Formula Three Cup race and the first to be held at the Autodromo Enzo e Dino Ferrari on October 26, 1986. The race was won by Italian Stefano Modena, driving for Euroteam outfit, who finished ahead of the previous years winner Alex Caffi and fellow Italian Nicola Larini.

== Drivers and teams ==
1986 Entry List
Team	No	Driver	Chassis	Engine
Venturini Racing	1	(Italy) Alex Caffi	Dallara 386	Alfa Romeo
Enzo Coloni Racing	2	(Italy) Nicola Larini	Dallara 386	Alfa Romeo
Enzo Coloni Racing	3	(Italy) Marco Apicella	Dallara 386	Alfa Romeo
Euroteam	4	(Italy) Stefano Modena	Reynard 863	Alfa Romeo
Prema Racing	5	(Italy) Massimo Monti	Ralt RT30	Volkswagen
Euroracing Junior Team	6	(Italy) Eugenio Visco	Dallara 386	Alfa Romeo
ORECA	11	(France) Yannick Dalmas	Martini MK49	Volkswagen
ORECA	13	(France) Michel Trollé	Martini MK49	Volkswagen
Jose Alesi	12	(France) Jean Alesi	Dallara 386	Alfa Romeo
DRS / Patrick Jamin	14	(France) Gilles Lempereur	Dallara 386	Volkswagen
Wolfgang Kaufmann	21	(Germany) Wolfgang Kaufmann	Ralt RT30	Volkswagen
Team Sonax Autopflege	23	(Germany) Bernd Schneider	Reynard 863	Volkswagen
Trivellato Racing	24	(Spain) Alfonso de Vinuesa	Dallara 386	Alfa Romeo
Squadra Foitek	25	(Switzerland) Hans-Peter Kaufmann	Dallara 386	Volkswagen
Squadra Foitek	51	(Switzerland) Gregor Foitek	Dallara 386	Volkswagen
Swallow Racing	32	(Brazil) Maurizio Sandro Sala	Ralt RT30	Volkswagen
Neto Jochamowitz	34	(Peru) Neto Jochamowitz	Reynard 863	Volkswagen
The Swedish Lions	41	(Sweden) Niclas Schönström	Ralt RT30	Volkswagen
The Swedish Lions	42	(Sweden) Michael Johansson	Ralt RT30	Volkswagen
HT Racing	43	(Sweden) Hasse Thaung	Ralt RT30	Volkswagen
Finlandia F-Team	32	(Finland) Sami Pensala	Reynard 863	Volkswagen
Carrena Motorpro	45	(Sweden) Henrik Barkström	Ralt RT30	Volkswagen
Team Quality	46	(Sweden) Håkan Olausson	Ralt RT30	Volkswagen
Jakob Bordoli	52	(Switzerland) Jakob Bordoli	Martini MK49	Volkswagen
Team Forti Corse	53	(Switzerland) Urs Dudler	Dallara 386	Volkswagen
Formel Rennsport Club	54	(Switzerland) Jo Zeller	Ralt RT30	Toyota
Ruedi Schurter	55	(Switzerland) Ruedi Schurter	Reynard 863	Volkswagen
Fritz Augsburger	56	(Switzerland) Fritz Augsburger	Reynard 863	Volkswagen

== Classification ==
=== Qualifying ===
Pos	No	Driver	Team	Time	Gap
1	5	(Italy) Massimo Monti	Prema Racing	1:45.64	
2	3	(Italy) Marco Apicella	Enzo Coloni Racing	1:45.73	+ 0.09 s
3	11	(France) Yannick Dalmas	ORECA	1:45.80	+ 0.16 s
4	2	(Italy) Nicola Larini	Enzo Coloni Racing	1:45.98	+ 0.38 s
5	6	(Italy) Eugenio Visco	Euroracing Junior Team	1:46.06	+ 0.42 s
6	4	(Italy) Stefano Modena	Euroteam	1:46.20	+ 0.56 s
7	1	(Italy) Alex Caffi	Venturini Racing	1:46.25	+ 0.61 s
8	21	(Germany) Wolfgang Kaufmann	Wolfgang Kaufmann	1:46.84	+ 1.20 s
9	51	(Switzerland) Gregor Foitek	Squadra Foitek	1:46.84	+ 1.20 s
10	32	(Brazil) Maurizio Sandro Sala	Swallow Racing	1:47.00	+ 1.48 s
11	24	(Spain) Alfonso de Vinuesa	Trivellato Racing	1:47.01	+ 1.49 s
12	23	(Germany) Bernd Schneider	Team Sonax Autopflege	1:47.25	+ 1.73 s
13	25	(Switzerland) Hans-Peter Kaufmann	Squadra Foitek	1:47.30	+ 1.78 s
14	12	(France) Jean Alesi	Jose Alesi	1:47.48	+ 1.84 s
15	13	(France) Michel Trollé	ORECA	1:47.50	+ 1.86 s
16	34	(Peru) Neto Jochamowitz	Neto Jochamowitz	1:47.84	+ 2.22 s
17	42	(Sweden) Michael Johansson	The Swedish Lions	1:48.02	+ 2.48 s
18	53	(Switzerland) Urs Dudler	Team Forti Corse	1:48.11	+ 2.57 s
19	43	(Sweden) Hasse Thaung	HT Racing	1:48.18	+ 2.64 s
20	41	(Sweden) Niclas Schönström	The Swedish Lions	1:48.22	+ 2.68 s
21	14	(France) Gilles Lemperuer	DRS / Patrick Jamin	1:48.27	+ 2.73 s
22	45	(Sweden) Henrik Barkström	Carrena Motopro	1:48.47	+ 2.83 s
23	54	(Switzerland) Jo Zeller	Formel Rennsport Club	1:48.96	+ 3.32 s
24	52	(Switzerland) Jakob Bordoli	Jakob Bordoli	1:49.09	+ 3.45 s
25	44	(Finland) Sami Pensala	Finlandia F-Team	1:49.39	+ 3.75 s
26	46	(Sweden) Håkan Olausson	Team Quality	1:49.86	+ 4.22 s
27	55	(Switzerland) Ruedi Schurter	Ruedi Schurter	1:50.02	+ 4.48 s
28	56	(Switzerland) Franz Augsburger	Franz Augsburger	1:50.12	+ 4.58 s

=== Race ===
Pos	No	Driver	Team	Laps	Time / Retired	Grid
1	4	(Italy) Stefano Modena	Euroteam	20	43min 54.33sec	6
2	1	(Italy) Alex Caffi	Venturini Racing	20	+ 59.12 s	7
3	2	(Italy) Nicola Larini	Enzo Coloni Racing	20	+ 1:02.94 s	4
4	32	(Brazil) Maurizio Sandro Sala	Swallow Racing	20	+ 1:24.55 s	10
5	34	(Peru) Neto Jochamowitz	Neto Jochamowitz	20	+ 1:30.88 s	16
6	13	(France) Michel Trollé	ORECA	20	+ 2:20.39 s	15
7	5	(Italy) Massimo Monti	Prema Racing	19	+ 1 Lap	1
8	46	(Sweden) Håkan Olausson	Team Quality	19	+ 1 Lap	26
9	6	(Italy) Eugenio Visco	Euroracing Junior Team	19	+ 1 Lap	5
10	12	(France) Jean Alesi	Jose Alesi	19	+ 1 Lap	14
11	21	(Germany) Wolfgang Kaufmann	Wolfgang Kaufmann	19	+ 1 Lap	8
12	43	(Sweden) Hasse Thaung	HT Racing	19	+ 1 Lap	19
13	52	(Switzerland) Jakob Bordoli	Jakob Bordoli	19	+ 1 Lap	24
14	54	(Switzerland) Jo Zeller	Formel Rennsport Club	18	+ 2 Laps	23
15	55	(Switzerland) Ruedi Schurter	Ruedi Schurter	18	+ 2 Laps	27
Ret	23	(Germany) Bernd Schneider	Team Sonax Autopflege	17	Retired	12
Ret	25	(Switzerland) Hans-Peter Kaufmann	Squadra Foitek	14	Retired	13
Ret	53	(Switzerland) Urs Dudler	Team Forti Corse	14	Retired	18
Ret	14	(France) Gilles Lempereur	DRS / Patrick Jamin	12	Retired	21
Ret	41	(Sweden) Niclas Schönström	The Swedish Lions	11	Retired	20
Ret	24	(Spain) Alfonso de Vinuesa	Trivellato Racing	6	Retired	11
Ret	45	(Sweden) Henrik Barkström	Carrena Motopro	5	Retired	22
Ret	3	(Italy) Marco Apicella	Enzo Coloni Racing	2	Retired	2
Ret	56	(Switzerland) Franz Augsburger	Franz Augsburger	2	Retired	28
Ret	42	(Sweden) Michael Johansson	The Swedish Lions	1	Retired	17
Ret	51	(Sweden) Gregor Foitek	Squadra Foitek	0	Retired	9
Ret	11	(France) Yannick Dalmas	ORECA	0	Retired	3
DNS	44	(Finland) Sami Pensala	Finlandia F-Team		Did Not Start	

== See also ==
- FIA European Formula Three Cup

Preceded by 1985 European Formula Three Cup	FIA European Formula Three Cup; 1986	Succeeded by 1987 FIA European Formula Three Cup
