= 1986 Macau Grand Prix =

Formula Three motor race

Race details
Date	23 November 1986
Location	Guia Circuit, Macau
Course	Temporary street circuit 6.120 km (3.803 mi)
Distance	Leg 1; 15 laps, 91.8 km (57.0 mi); Leg 2; 15 laps, 91.8 km (57.0 mi)
- Leg 1

Pole
Driver	(Italy) Stefano Modena
Time	2:22.41

Fastest Lap
Driver	(Italy) Emanuele Pirro
Time	2:24.31

Podium
First	(United Kingdom) Andy Wallace
Second	(Netherlands) Jan Lammers
Third	(Brazil) Maurício Gugelmin
- Leg 2

Pole
Driver	(United Kingdom) Andy Wallace

Fastest Lap
Driver	(Italy) Emanuele Pirro
Time	2:22.85

Podium
First	(United Kingdom) Andy Wallace
Second	(Italy) Emanuele Pirro
Third	(Brazil) Maurício Gugelmin
- Overall Results
First	(United Kingdom) Andy Wallace
Second	(Brazil) Maurício Gugelmin
Third	(Netherlands) Jan Lammers

The 1986 Macau Grand Prix Formula Three was the 33rd Macau Grand Prix race to be held on the streets of Macau on 23 November 1986. It was the third edition for Formula Three cars.

== Entry list ==
Team	No	Driver	Vehicle	Engine
(British Hong Kong) Marlboro Theodore Racing w/ David Price Racing	1	(Italy) Ivan Capelli	Reynard 863	Alfa Romeo
(British Hong Kong) Marlboro Theodore Racing w/ David Price Racing	2	(United Kingdom) Johnny Dumfries	Reynard 863	Volkswagen
(United Kingdom) David Price Racing	30	(France) Paul Belmondo	Reynard 863	Alfa Romeo
(British Hong Kong) Marlboro Theodore Racing w/ Eddie Jordan Racing	3	(Italy) Emanuele Pirro	Ralt RT30	Volkswagen
(Republic of Ireland) Eddie Jordan Racing	5	(Denmark) John Nielsen	Ralt RT30	Volkswagen
(United Kingdom) Flying Tigers Murray Taylor Racing	6	(Netherlands) Jan Lammers	Ralt RT30	Volkswagen
(United Kingdom) Flying Tigers Murray Taylor Racing	7	(United Kingdom) Damon Hill	Ralt RT30	Volkswagen
(United Kingdom) Cellnet Racing	8	(United Kingdom) David Hunt	Ralt RT30	Toyota
(United Kingdom) Intersport Racing	9	(New Zealand) Mike Thackwell	Ralt RT30	Toyota
(United Kingdom) Watsons Water Madgwick Motorsport	10	(United Kingdom) Andy Wallace	Reynard 863	Volkswagen
(United Kingdom) Watsons Water West Surrey Racing	11	(Brazil) Maurício Gugelmin	Ralt RT30	Volkswagen
(Germany) West Volkswagen Motorsport	12	(Denmark) Kris Nissen	Ralt RT30	Volkswagen
(Germany) West Volkswagen Motorsport	15	(Argentina) Víctor Rosso	Ralt RT30	Volkswagen
(France) ORECA Team Elf	16	(France) Yannick Dalmas	Martini MK49	Volkswagen
(France) ORECA Team Elf	17	(France) Michel Trolle	Martini MK49	Volkswagen
(United Kingdom) Swallow Racing	18	(United Kingdom) Martin Donnelly	Ralt RT30	Volkswagen
(United Kingdom) Swallow Racing	19	(Brazil) Maurizio Sandro Sala	Ralt RT30	Volkswagen
(United Kingdom) Mike Rowe Racing	20	(United Kingdom) Andrew Gilbert-Scott	Ralt RT30	Volkswagen
(Italy) Euroteam Cipa	21	(Italy) Stefano Modena	Reynard 863	Alfa Romeo
(Italy) Forti Corse	22	(Italy) Franco Forini	Dallara 386	Volkswagen
(Germany) Werner Schröder	23	(Germany) Hanspeter Kaufmann	Dallara 386	Volkswagen
(France) SNDP	25	(France) Jean Alesi	Dallara 386	Alfa Romeo
(Sweden) Tommy Jagerwall	26	(Sweden) Michael Johansson	Ralt RT30	Alfa Romeo
(Sweden) Picko Troberg Racing	27	(Sweden) Niclas Schönström	Reynard 863	Volkswagen
(Italy) MC Motorsport	28	(Italy) Enrico Bertaggia	Dallara 386	Alfa Romeo
Monaco Sponsoring	29	(France) Didier Theys	Martini MK49	Volkswagen
(Germany) VIT Formula Racing	31	(Germany) Bernd Schneider	Reynard 863	Volkswagen
(Japan) TOM'S Racing Team	32	(United Kingdom) Geoff Lees	Ralt RT30	Toyota
(Japan) Team Kitamura	33	(Japan) Shuji Hyodo	Reynard 863	Toyota
(Japan) KM2 Motorsports	35	(Japan) Shigeki Matsui	Reynard 863	Toyota
(Japan) Zest Motorsports	36	(Japan) Mitsumasa Watanabe	Ralt RT30	Volkswagen
(Italy) Pavesi Team	96	(Italy) Pierluigi Martini	Ralt RT30	Alfa Romeo

== Race results ==
Pos.	No.	Driver	Team	Car
1	10	(United Kingdom) Andy Wallace	Watsons Water Madgwick Motorsport	Reynard 863 - Volkswagen
2	11	(Brazil) Maurício Gugelmin	Watsons Water West Surrey Racing	Ralt RT30 - Volkswagen
3	6	(Netherlands) Jan Lammers	Intersport Racing	Ralt RT30 - Volkswagen
4	3	(Italy) Emanuele Pirro	Eddie Jordan Racing w/ Marlboro Theodore Racing	Ralt RT30 - Volkswagen
5	8	(France) Yannick Dalmas	ORECA Team Elf	Martini MK49 - Volkswagen
6	17	(France) Michel Trolle	ORECA Team Elf	Martini MK49 - Volkswagen
7	22	(Italy) Franco Forini	Forti Corse	Dallara 386 - Volkswagen
8	25	(France) Jean Alesi	SNDP	Dallara 386 - Alfa Romeo
9	5	(Denmark) John Nielsen	Eddie Jordan Racing	Ralt RT30 - Volkswagen
10	96	(Italy) Pierluigi Martini	Pavesi Team	Ralt RT30 - Alfa Romeo
11	1	(Italy) Ivan Capelli	David Price Racing w/ Marlboro Theodore Racing	Reynard 863 - Alfa Romeo
12	19	(Brazil) Maurizio Sandro Sala	Swallow Racing	Ralt RT30 - Volkswagen
13	21	(Italy) Stefano Modena	Euroteam Cipa	Reynard 863 - Alfa Romeo
14	20	(United Kingdom) Andrew Gilbert-Scott	Mike Rowe Racing	Ralt RT30 - Volkswagen
15	27	(Sweden) Niclas Schönström	Picko Troberg Racing	Reynard 863 - Volkswagen
16	26	(Sweden) Michael Johansson	Tommy Jagerwall	Ralt RT30- Alfa Romeo
17	33	(Japan) Shuji Hyodo	Team Kitamura	Reynard 863 - Toyota
18	23	(Germany) Hanspeter Kaufmann	Werner Schröder	Dallara 386 - Volkswagen
19	31	(Germany) Bernd Schneider	VIT Formula Racing	Reynard 863 - Volkswagen
20	30	(France) Paul Belmondo	David Price Racing	Reynard 863 - Alfa Romeo
DNF	25	(Italy) Enrico Bertaggia	MC Motorsport	Dallara 386 - Alfa Romeo
DNF	35	(Japan) Shigeki Matsui	KM2 Motorsports	Reynard 863 - Toyota
DNF	36	(Japan) Mitsumasa Watanabe	Venturini Racing	Ralt RT30 - Volkswagen
DNF	15	(Argentina) Víctor Rosso	Volkswagen Motorsport	Ralt RT30 - Volkswagen
DNF	2	(United Kingdom) Johnny Dumfries	David Price Racing w/ Marlboro Theodore Racing	Reynard 863 - Volkswagen
DNF	18	(United Kingdom) Martin Donnelly	Swallow Racing	Ralt RT30 - Volkswagen
DNF	7	(United Kingdom) Damon Hill	Flying Tigers Murray Taylor Racing	Ralt RT30 - Volkswagen
DNF	9	(New Zealand) Mike Thackwell	Intersport Racing	Ralt RT30 - Toyota
DNF	32	(United Kingdom) Geoff Lees	TOM'S Racing Team	Ralt RT30 - Toyota
DNF	29	(France) Didier Theys	Monaco Sponsoring	Martini MK49 - Volkswagen
DNF	12	(Denmark) Kris Nissen	Volkswagen Motorsport	Ralt RT30 - Volkswagen
DNF	12	(United Kingdom) David Hunt	Cellnet Racing	Ralt RT30 - Toyota
