= Barry Horne =

Barry Horne may refer to:

- Barry Horne (activist) (1952–2001), British animal rights activist
- Barry Horne (footballer) (born 1962), Welsh footballer
- Barry Horne (racing driver) (born 1977), British racing driver
