= 1985 FIA European Formula 3 Cup =

Race details
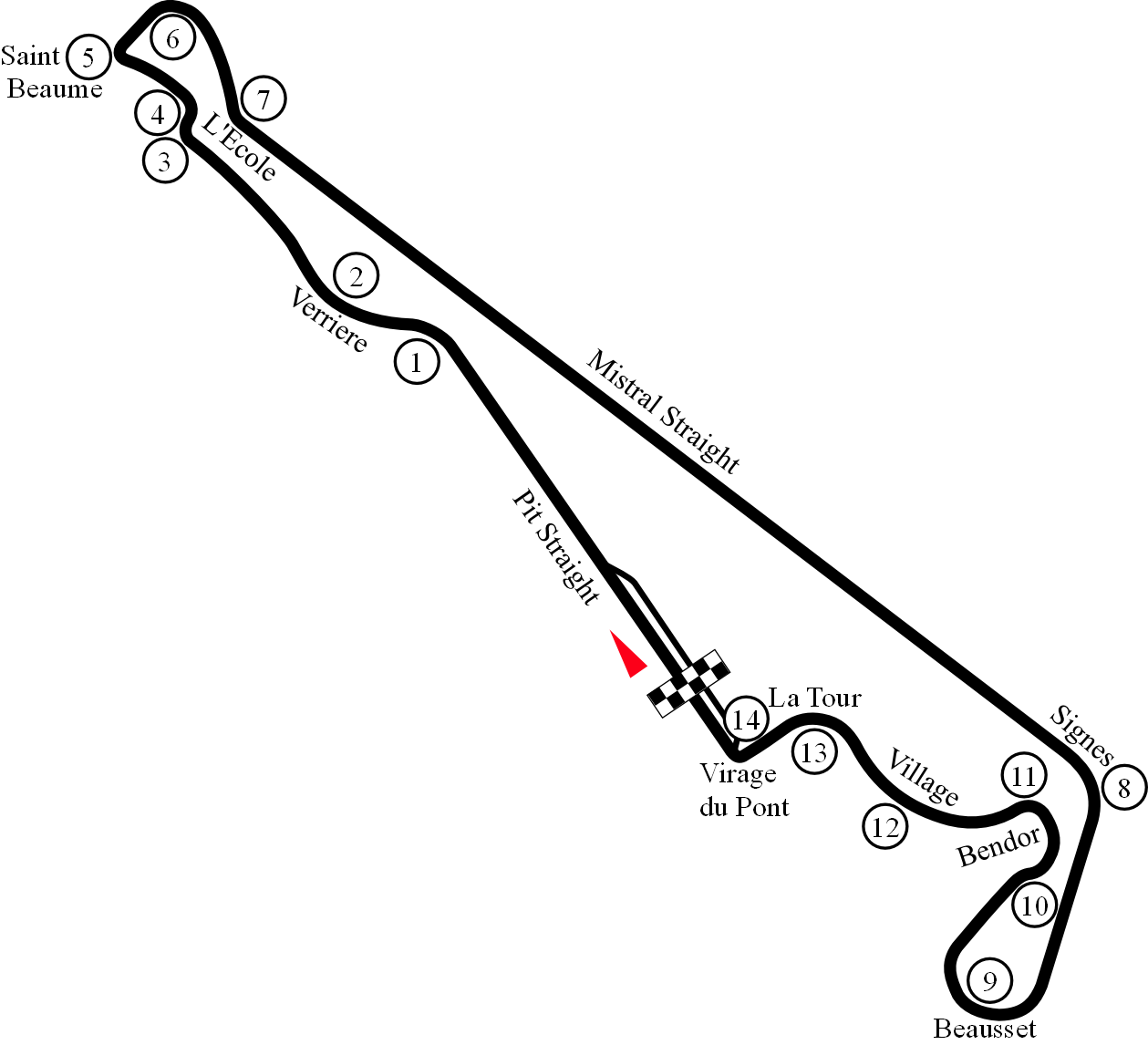
Date	27 October 1985
Official name	European Formula Three Cup
Location	Le Castellet, France
Course	Permanent racing facility 3.263 km (2.028 mi)
Distance	Race; 30 laps, 97.89 km (60.83 mi)
- Race

Pole Position
Driver	(Italy) Alex Caffi	Team Gulf Coloni

Podium
First	(Italy) Alex Caffi	Team Gulf Coloni
Second	(Sweden) Thomas Danielsson	The Swedish Lions
Third	(Germany) Volker Weidler	Josef Kaufmann Racing

The 1985 European Formula Three Cup was the inaugural European Formula Three Cup race held at the Paul Ricard Circuit on October 27, 1985. It was won by Italian Alex Caffi in dominant fashion having achieved pole position, fastest lap and the race win, driving for Team Gulf Coloni, who finished ahead of Swede Thomas Danielsson and German Volker Weidler.

== Drivers and teams ==
1985 Entry List
Team	No	Driver	Chassis	Engine
ORECA	1	(France) Pierre-Henri Raphanel	Martini MK45	Alfa Romeo
ORECA	7	(France) Yannick Dalmas	Martini MK45	Alfa Romeo
Scuderia Teutonia	2	(Austria) Franz Konrad	Martini MK45	Volkswagen
Scuderia Calanda	4	(Switzerland) Jakob Bordoli	Ralt RT3	Toyota
Team Forti Corse	5	(Switzerland) Franco Forini	Dallara 385	Volkswagen
Team Forti Corse	39	(Spain) Adrián Campos	Dallara 385	Volkswagen
The Swedish Lions	6	(Sweden) Thomas Danielsson	Reynard 853	Volkswagen
The Swedish Lions	12	(Sweden) Steven Andskär	Ralt RT30	Volkswagen
The Swedish Lions	19	(Sweden) Hasse Thaung	Ralt RT30	Alfa Romeo
The Swedish Lions	25	(Sweden) Leif Lindström	Ralt RT30	Toyota
Josef Kaufmann Racing	8	(Germany) Volker Weidler	Martini MK45	Volkswagen
Formel Rennsport Club	10	(Switzerland) Jo Zeller	Ralt RT3	Toyota
Formel Rennsport Club	23	(Switzerland) Urs Dudler	Ralt RT3	Toyota
Team Gulf Coloni	11	(Italy) Alex Caffi	Dallara 385	Alfa Romeo
Team Gulf Coloni	36	(Italy) Nicola Larini	Martini MK45	Alfa Romeo
Ecurie Elf	14	(France) Michel Trollé	Ralt RT30	Volkswagen
Volkswagen Motorsport	15	(Denmark) Kris Nissen	Ralt RT30	Volkswagen
Ruedi Schurter	17	(Switzerland) Ruedi Schurter	Anson SA4	Volkswagen
Team Venturini	18	(Italy) Fabrizio Barbazza	Dallara 385	Alfa Romeo
Team Venturini	24	(Italy) Marco Apicella	Dallara 385	Alfa Romeo
Serge Saulnier	20	(France) Denis Morin	Martini MK45	Alfa Romeo
Bertram Schäfer Racing	21	(Germany) Manuel Reuter	Ralt RT30	Volkswagen
Bertram Schäfer Racing	33	(Germany) Altfrid Heger	Ralt RT3	Volkswagen
Malte Bongers Motorsport	27	(Finland) Jari Nurminen	Martini MK45	Volkswagen
Franz Hunkeler	29	(Switzerland) Franz Hunkeler	Martini MK42	Alfa Romeo
Prema Racing	30	(Italy) Giorgio Montaldo	Ralt RT30	Volkswagen
Team Quality	31	(Sweden) Håkan Olausson	Ralt RT30	Alfa Romeo
David Price Racing	32	(France) Paul Belmondo	Reynard 853	Volkswagen
Walter Kupferschmid	35	(Switzerland) Walter Kupferscmid	Ralt RT3	Toyota
Michael Johansson	37	(Sweden) Michael Johansson	Ralt RT3	Toyota
Equipo Campsa	42	(Spain) Luis Pérez-Sala	Ralt RT30	Alfa Romeo

== Classification ==
=== Qualifying ===
Pos	No	Driver	Team	Time	Gap
1	11	(Italy) Alex Caffi	Team Gulf Coloni	1:16.14	
2	36	(Italy) Nicola Larini	Team Gulf Coloni	1:16.18	+ 0.04 s
3	8	(Germany) Volker Weidler	Josef Kaufmann Racing	1:16.37	+ 0.23 s
4	6	(Sweden) Thomas Danielsson	The Swedish Lions	1:16.45	+ 0.31 s
5	42	(Spain) Luis Pérez-Sala	Equipo Campsa	1:16.61	+ 0.47 s
6	16	(Denmark) Kris Nissen	Volkswagen Motorsport	1:16.76	+ 0.62 s
7	24	(Italy) Marco Apicella	Team Venturini	1:16.78	+ 0.64 s
8	21	(Germany) Manuel Reuter	Bertram Schäfer Racing	1:16.78	+ 0.64 s
9	39	(Spain) Adrián Campos	Team Forti Corse	1:16.79	+ 0.65 s
10	18	(Italy) Fabrizio Barbazza	Team Venturini	1:16.79	+ 0.65 s
11	7	(France) Yannick Dalmas	ORECA	1:16.81	+ 0.67 s
12	14	(France) Michel Trollé	Ecurie Elf	1:16.81	+ 0.67 s
13	30	(Italy) Giorgio Montaldo	Prema Racing	1:16.86	+ 0.72 s
14	27	(Finland) Jari Nurminen	Malte Bongers Motorsport	1:17.21	+ 1.07 s
15	32	(France) Paul Belmondo	David Price Racing	1:17.31	+ 1.17 s
16	33	(Germany) Altfrid Heger	Bertram Schäfer Racing	1:17.31	+ 1.17 s
17	25	(Sweden) Leif Lindström	Team Swedish Lions	1:17.33	+ 1.19 s
18	1	(France) Pierre-Henri Raphanel	ORECA	1:17.34	+ 1.20 s
19	5	(Switzerland) Franco Forini	Team Forti Corse	1:17.36	+ 1.22 s
20	12	(Sweden) Steven Andskär	Team Swedish Lions	1:17.58	+ 1.44 s
21	10	(Switzerland) Jo Zeller	Formel Rennsport Club	1:17.60	+ 1.46 s
22	23	(Switzerland) Urs Dudler	Formel Rennsport Club	1:17.69	+ 1.55 s
23	37	(Sweden) Michael Johansson	Michael Johansson	1:17.89	+ 1.75 s
24	20	(France) Denis Morin	Serge Saulnier	1:17.95	+ 1.81 s
25	19	(Sweden) Hasse Thaung	The Swedish Lions	1:18.02	+ 1.88 s
26	4	(Switzerland) Jakob Bordoli	Scuderia Calanda	1:18.63	+ 2.49 s
27	31	(Sweden) Håkan Olausson	Team Quality	1:18.64	+ 2.50 s
28	2	(Austria) Franz Konrad	Scuderia Teutonia	1:18.83	+ 2.69 s
29	17	(Switzerland) Ruedi Schurter	Scuderia Calanda	1:19.87	+ 3.73 s
30	35	(Switzerland) Walter Kupferschmid	Walter Kupferschmid	1:20.22	+ 4.08 s
31	29	(Switzerland) Franz Hunkeler	Franz Hunkeler	1:21.35	+ 5.31 s

=== Race ===
Pos	No	Driver	Team	Laps	Time / Retired	Grid
1	11	(Italy) Alex Caffi	Team Gulf Coloni	30	39min 59.27sec	1
2	6	(Sweden) Thomas Danielsson	The Swedish Lions	30	+ 5.29 s	4
3	8	(Germany) Volker Weidler	Josef Kaufmann Racing	30	+ 8.16 s	3
4	36	(Italy) Nicola Larini	Team Gulf Coloni	30	+ 9.40 s	2
5	42	(Spain) Luis Pérez-Sala	Equipo Campsa	30	+ 22.11 s	5
6	30	(Italy) Giorgio Montaldo	Prema Racing	30	+ 23.91 s	13
7	21	(Germany) Manuel Reuter	Bertram Schäfer Racing	30	+ 26.94 s	8
8	39	(Spain) Adrián Campos	Team Forti Corse	30	+ 28.97 s	9
9	32	(France) Paul Belmondo	David Price Racing	30	+ 29.28 s	15
10	16	(Denmark) Kris Nissen	Volkswagen Motorsport	30	+ 37.49 s	6
11	5	(Switzerland) Franco Forini	Team Forti Corse	30	+ 39.87 s	19
12	33	(Germany) Altfrid Heger	Bertram Schäfer Racing	30	+ 41.56 s	16
13	1	(France) Pierre-Henri Raphanel	ORECA	30	+ 42.94 s	18
14	37	(Sweden) Michael Johansson	Michael Johansson	30	+ 48.20 s	23
15	12	(Sweden) Steven Andskär	The Swedish Lions	30	+ 55.18 s	20
16	2	(Austria) Franz Konrad	Scuderia Teutonia	30	+ 56.41 s	28
17	25	(Sweden) Leif Lindström	The Swedish Lions	30	+ 57.09 s	17
18	10	(Switzerland) Jo Zeller	Formel Rennsport Club	30	+ 58.17 s	21
19	20	(France) Denis Morin	Serge Saulnier	30	+ 1:03.54 s	24
20	4	(Switzerland) Jakob Bordoli	Scuderia Calanda	30	+ 1:13.44 s	26
21	31	(Sweden) Hasse Thaung	The Swedish Lions	30	+ 1:15.04 s	25
22	27	(Finland) Jari Nurminen	Maltes Bongers Motorsport	30	+ 1:18.17 s	14
23	23	(Switzerland) Urs Dudler	Formel Rennsport Club	29	+ 1 Lap	22
24	35	(Switzerland) Walter Kupferschmid	Walter Kupferscmid	29	+ 1 Lap	30
25	17	(Switzerland) Ruedi Schurter	Ruedi Schurter	29	+ 1 Lap	29
26	29	(Switzerland) Franz Hunkeler	Franz Hunkeler	28	+ 2 Laps	31
27	18	(Italy) Fabrizio Barbazza	Team Venturini	26	+ 4 Laps	10
Ret	31	(Sweden) Håkan Olausson	Team Quality	20	Retired	27
Ret	7	(France) Yannick Dalmas	ORECA	11	Retired	11
Ret	24	(Italy) Marco Apicella	Team Venturini	9	Retired	7
Ret	14	(France) Michel Trollé	Ecurie Elf	4	Retired	12

== See also ==
FIA European Formula Three Cup

Preceded by none	FIA European Formula Three Cup; 1985	Succeeded by 1986 FIA European Formula Three Cup
