= 2004 Porsche Supercup =

12th Porsche Supercup season

The 2004 Porsche Michelin Supercup season was the 12th Porsche Supercup season. The races were all supporting races in the 2004 Formula One season. It travelled to ten circuits across Europe and a double-header at Indianapolis, USA. It was the last season that the 996 model was raced. It was replaced with the 997 model in 2005.

== Teams and drivers ==
Team	No.	Drivers	Rounds
(Germany) Porsche AG	1	(Italy) Nicola Larini	1
(Germany) Porsche AG	1	(Spain) Luis Pérez-Sala	2
(Germany) Porsche AG	1	(Portugal) Pedro Lamy	3
(Germany) Porsche AG	1	(Germany) Timo Glock	4
(Germany) Porsche AG	1	(United Kingdom) Mark Taylor	5
(Germany) Porsche AG	1	(Brazil) Nelson Piquet Jr.	6
(Germany) Porsche AG	1	(France) Richard Sainct	7
(Germany) Porsche AG	1	(Hungary) Gábor Talmácsi	8
(Germany) Porsche AG	1	(France) James Ruffier	9
(Germany) Porsche AG	1	(Italy) Matteo Bobbi	10
(Germany) Porsche AG	2	(Italy) Franco Nugnes	1
(Germany) Porsche AG	2	(Germany) Jörg Bergmeister	2
(Germany) Porsche AG	2	(Monaco) Clivio Piccione	3
(Germany) Porsche AG	2	(Germany) Carsten Spengemann	4
(Germany) Porsche AG	2	(United States) Patrick Long	5
(Germany) Porsche AG	2	(United Kingdom) Barry Horne	6
(Germany) Porsche AG	2	(Germany) Sascha Maassen	7
(Germany) Porsche AG	2	(Hungary) Gergeli Szabo	8
(Germany) Porsche AG	2	(Belgium) Vanina Ickx	9
(Germany) Porsche AG	2	(Italy) Emanuele Busnelli	10
(Germany) UPS Porsche-Junior Team	28	(Germany) Mike Rockenfeller	3, 7–9, 11
(Germany) UPS Porsche-Junior Team	29	(Germany) Christian Mamerow	3, 7–9, 11
(Germany) Infineon-Team Farnbacher PZM	4	(Germany) Dominik Farnbacher	All
(Germany) Infineon-Team Farnbacher PZM	5	(Germany) Wolf Henzler	All
(Germany) Infineon-Team Farnbacher PZM	6	(Germany) Dirk Werner	All
(Austria) Walter Lechner Racing School Team	7	(Austria) Walter Lechner Jr.	All
(Austria) Walter Lechner Racing School Team	8	(Italy) Andrea Montermini	All
(Austria) Walter Lechner Racing School Team	?	(Austria) Klaus Engelhorn	3
(Germany) Harberth Motorsport/PZ Olympiapark	9	(Germany) Bernhard Laber	1, 3
(Germany) Harberth Motorsport/PZ Olympiapark	9	(Germany) Robert Renauer	5, 8–9
(Germany) Harberth Motorsport/PZ Olympiapark	10	(Belgium) Max von Braunmühl	1, 3, 5, 9, 11
(Germany) Harberth Motorsport/PZ Olympiapark	?/10	(Germany) Alfred Renauer	1, 8–9
(Netherlands) Team Bleekemolen	11	(Netherlands) Michael Bleekemolen	1–3, 10
(Netherlands) Team Bleekemolen	12	(Netherlands) Sebastiaan Bleekemolen	1–3, 10
(Netherlands) Team Bleekemolen	23	(Netherlands) Evert Kroon	2
(Netherlands) Jetstream Motorsport	14	(Netherlands) Simon Frederiks	All
(Netherlands) Jetstream Motorsport	15	(Netherlands) Marcel Kesseler	All
(Germany) Kadach Racing Team	16	(Switzerland) Phillip Beyrer	2–11
(Germany) Kadach Racing Team	17	(Germany) Tim Bergmeister	All
(Germany) Kadach Racing Team	99	(Belgium) David Saelens	All
(Germany) Eichin Racing-PZ Freiburg	18	(Germany) Mike Rockenfeller	4
(Germany) Eichin Racing-PZ Freiburg	?	(Germany) Alexander Roloff	4
(Italy) Conrero Squadra Corse	19	(France) Cyrille Sauvage	1
(Germany) DeWalt Racing-PZRO-J. Alzen Motorsport	20	(Netherlands) Patrick Huisman	All
(Germany) DeWalt Racing-PZRO-J. Alzen Motorsport	21	(Italy) Alessandro Zampedri	All
(Germany) DeWalt Racing-PZRO-J. Alzen Motorsport	?	(Belgium) Bert van Rossem	9–11
(Germany) AKF Motorsport	22	(Germany) Oliver Freymuth	1–4, 6–8
(Hungary) Bovi Motorsport	23	(Hungary) Ferenc Ratkai	9
(Hungary) Bovi Motorsport	?	(Hungary) Kálmán Bódis	9, 11
(United States) The Racer's Group	23	(United States) Pat Flanagan	5
(United States) The Racer's Group	24	(United States) Joseph Kunz	5
(United States) The Racer's Group	25	(United States) Gary Becker	5
(United States) The Racer's Group	26	(United States) Jim Collier	5
(United States) The Racer's Group	27	(United States) Marc P. Bullock	5
(United Kingdom) Porsche Cars Great Britain	24	(United Kingdom) Chris Cooper	7
(United Kingdom) Porsche Cars Great Britain	24	(United Kingdom) Barry Horne	10–11
(United Kingdom) Porsche Cars Great Britain	25	(United Kingdom) Martin Rich	7
(France) Jérôme Policand	24	(France) Jérôme Policand	6
(Germany) EMC Araxa Racing	24	(Germany) Jörg Hardt	4, 8, 11
(Germany) Araxa Buchbinder Racing	25	(Germany) Marc Warnecke	8
(Germany) Araxa Buchbinder Racing	?	(Germany) Christoph Langen	4
(Germany) Mamerow Racing-PZ Essen	25	(Austria) Hannes Lachinger	4
(United Kingdom) Porsche Cars Great Britain	26	(United Kingdom) Jason Templeman	7
(United Kingdom) Porsche Cars Great Britain	30	(United Kingdom) Marcus Thomas	4
(Germany) MRS PC Service Team	26	(United States) Peter Boss	4
(Germany) MRS PC Service Team	?	(Denmark) Kurt Thiim	8
(Germany) MRS PC Service Team	?	(Italy) Giuseppe Chiminelli	11
(Germany) MRS PC Service Team	?	(Italy) Ivano Giuliani	11
(Germany) Yarpivo Racing MRS	?	(Russia) Oleg Kesselman	3
(France) Anthony Beltoise	27	(France) Anthony Beltoise	3
(France) JAB Racing	27	(France) Luc Rozentvaig	6
(France) JAB Racing	28	(France) Pascal Ballay	6
(United States) Steve Johnson	28	(United States) Steve Johnson	5
(United States) Gary C. Pennington	29	(United States) Gary Pennington	5
(United States) Tim Rosengrant	30	(United States) Tim Rosengrant	5
(France) Cyril Helias	30	(France) Cyril Helias	6
(Germany) Tolimit Motorsport	39	(Germany) Christian Menzel	All
(Germany) Tolimit Motorsport	45	(Austria) Richard Lietz	8–11
(Germany) Tolimit Motorsport	46	(Germany) Klaus Graf	1–8, 11
(France) Gabriel Balthazard	?	(France) Gabriel Balthazard	6
(France) Nourry Competition	?	(France) Michel Nourry	6
(France) Jean Yves-Adam	?	(France) Jean Yves-Adam	6
(Slovakia) Motorsport R.T.S. Bratislava	?	(Slovakia) Andrej Studenic	9

== Race calendar and results ==
Round		Circuit	Country	Date	Pole position	Fastest lap	Winning driver	Winning team	Report
1	R	(Italy) Autodromo Enzo e Dino Ferrari	Italy	April 25	(Germany) Wolf Henzler	(Germany) Wolf Henzler	(Germany) Wolf Henzler	(Germany) Infineon-Team Farnbacher PZM	Report
2	R	(Spain) Circuit de Catalunya	Spain	May 9	(Germany) Wolf Henzler	(Germany) Wolf Henzler	(Germany) Wolf Henzler	(Germany) Infineon-Team Farnbacher PZM	Report
3	R	Circuit de Monaco	Monaco	May 23	(Germany) Mike Rockenfeller	(Germany) Mike Rockenfeller	(Germany) Mike Rockenfeller	(Germany) Porsche AG	Report
4	R	(Germany) Nürburgring	Germany	May 30	(Germany) Wolf Henzler	(Germany) Wolf Henzler	(Germany) Wolf Henzler	(Germany) Infineon-Team Farnbacher PZM	Report
5	R1	(United States) Indianapolis Motor Speedway	United States	June 19	(Germany) Wolf Henzler	(Germany) Wolf Henzler	(Germany) Wolf Henzler	(Germany) Infineon-Team Farnbacher PZM	Report
5	R2	(United States) Indianapolis Motor Speedway	United States	June 20	(Germany) Wolf Henzler	(Germany) Wolf Henzler	(Germany) Wolf Henzler	(Germany) Infineon-Team Farnbacher PZM	Report
6	R	(France) Circuit de Nevers Magny-Cours	France	July 4	(Germany) Wolf Henzler	(Germany) Wolf Henzler	(Germany) Wolf Henzler	(Germany) Infineon-Team Farnbacher PZM	Report
7	R	(United Kingdom) Silverstone Circuit	United Kingdom	July 10	(Germany) Wolf Henzler	(Germany) Wolf Henzler	(Germany) Wolf Henzler	(Germany) Infineon-Team Farnbacher PZM	Report
8	R	(Germany) Hockenheimring	Germany	July 24	(Germany) Mike Rockenfeller	(Germany) Wolf Henzler	(Germany) Mike Rockenfeller	(Germany) Porsche AG	Report
9	R	(Hungary) Hungaroring	Hungary	August 15	(Germany) Mike Rockenfeller	(Germany) Wolf Henzler	(Germany) Wolf Henzler	(Germany) Infineon-Team Farnbacher PZM	Report
10	R	(Belgium) Circuit de Spa-Francorchamps	Belgium	29 August	(Italy) Andrea Montermini	(Germany) Wolf Henzler	(Germany) Wolf Henzler	(Germany) Infineon-Team Farnbacher PZM	Report
11	R	(Italy) Autodromo Nazionale Monza	Italy	September 12	(Germany) Wolf Henzler	(Germany) Mike Rockenfeller	(Germany) Jörg Hardt	(Germany) Infineon-Team Farnbacher PZM	Report

== Championship standings ==
Position	1st	2nd	3rd	4th	5th	6th	7th	8th	9th	10th	11th	12th	13th	14th	15th	Ref
Points	20	18	16	14	12	10	9	8	7	6	5	4	3	2	1	

Pos	Driver	IMO (Italy)	CAT (Spain)	MON (Monaco)	NÜR (Germany)	IND (United States)		MAG (France)	SIL (United Kingdom)	HOC (Germany)	HUN (Hungary)	SPA (Belgium)	MZA (Italy)	Points
1	(Germany) Wolf Henzler	**1**	**1**	2	**1**	**1**	**1**	**1**	**1**	2	1	1	**Ret**	220
2	(Germany) Christian Menzel	2	8	12	5	4	3	2	8	6	21	4	2	162
3	(Germany) Dirk Werner	7	4	3	Ret	3	2	5	3	15	2	19†	5	154
4	(Italy) Andrea Montermini	12	6	DNS	4	7	12	3	10	3	5	**2**	Ret	124
5	(Netherlands) Patrick Huisman	9	13	4	9	5	8	6	7	16	Ret	6	4	117
6	(Belgium) David Saelens	4	7	7	Ret	8	7	Ret	5	9	12	5	7	114
7	(Germany) Dominik Farnbacher	3	10	11	10	Ret	14	8	Ret	13	9	8	6	93
8	(Austria) Walter Lechner Jr.	Ret	11	8	12	Ret	11	DSQ	4	10	6	3	Ret	90
9	(Germany) Klaus Graf	8	2	10	3	Ret	5	Ret	18†	Ret			3	86
10	(Germany) Tim Bergmeister	6	12	Ret	DSQ	6	10	7	9	Ret	8	9	12	81
11	(Italy) Alessandro Zampedri	Ret	3	5	Ret	12	6	Ret	6	12	Ret	Ret	10	79
12	(Switzerland) Philip Beyrer		Ret	16	14	10	13	9	11	18	Ret	15	21†	58
13	(Netherlands) Marcel Kesseler	15	17	17	16	11	15	12	14	19	13	Ret	14	54
14	(Netherlands) Simon Frederiks	18	Ret	20	17	13	19	14	15	23	15	18	Ret	38
15	(Germany) Oliver Freymuth	14	16	18	13			13	12	21				31
guest drivers ineligible for championship points
	(Germany) Mike Rockenfeller			**1**	2				2	**1**	**3**		8	0
	(Germany) Jörg Hardt				6					5			1	0
	(United States) Patrick Long					2	4							0
	(France) Jérôme Policand							4						0
	(Germany) Sascha Maassen									4				0
	(Germany) Christian Mamerow			14					16†	11	4		Ret	0
	(Netherlands) Sebastiaan Bleekemolen	5	9	9								7		0
	(Germany) Jörg Bergmeister		5											0
	(France) Anthony Beltoise			6										0
	(Germany) Timo Glock				7									0
	(Germany) Robert Renauer					9	9			7	Ret			0
	(Austria) Richard Lietz									8	7	12	9	0
	(Austria) Hannes Lachinger				8									0
	(Germany) Alfred Renauer	11								14	10			0
	(France) Cyrille Sauvage	10												0
	(France) Luc Rozentvaig							10						0
	(France) James Ruffier											10		0
	(Netherlands) Michael Bleekemolen	13	14	Ret								11		0
	(Germany) Alexander Roloff				11									0
	(France) Cyril Helias							11						0
	(Slovakia) Andrej Studenic										11			0
	(Italy) Matteo Bobbi												11	0
	(Monaco) Clivio Piccione			13										0
	(United Kingdom) Martin Rich								13			17		0
	(United Kingdom) Barry Horne								17†			14	13	0
	(Belgium) Vanina Ickx											13		0
	(United States) Jim Collier					14	20							0
	(Hungary) Gábor Talmácsi										14			0
	(Spain) Luis Pérez-Sala		15											0
	(Portugal) Pedro Lamy			15										0
	(United States) Peter Boss				15									0
	(United States) Tim Rosengrant					15	16							0
	(France) Michel Nourry							15						0
	(Italy) Emanuele Busnelli												15	0
	(Germany) Bernhard Laber	16		Ret										0
	(France) Pascal Ballay							16						0
	(United States) Joseph Kunz					16	17							0
	(Belgium) Bert van Rossem										17	16	17	0
	(Belgium) Max von Braunmühl	17		Ret		21†	Ret				16		16	0
	(United States) Pat Flanagan					17	18							0
	(France) Jean-Yves Adam							17						0
	(Denmark) Kurt Thiim									17				0
	(Netherlands) Evert Kroon		18											0
	(Germany) Christoph Langen				18									0
	(United States) Steve Johnson					18	21							0
	(Hungary) Kálmán Bódis										18		20	0
	(Italy) Ivano Giuliani												18	0
	(Austria) Klaus Engelhorn			19										0
	(United States) Marc P. Bullock					19	22							0
	(Hungary) Gergeli Szabo										19			0
	(Italy) Giuseppe Chiminelli												19	0
	(United States) Gary Pennington					20	24							0
	(Germany) Mark Warnecke									20				0
	(Hungary) Ferenc Ratkai										20			0
	(Russia) Oleg Kesselman			21										0
	(France) Richard Sainct									22				0
	(United States) Gary Becker					Ret	23							0
	(United Kingdom) Mark Taylor					Ret	Ret							0
	(Italy) Nicola Larini	Ret												0
	(Italy) Franco Nugnes	Ret												0
	(Germany) Carsten Spengemann				Ret									0
	(France) Gabriel Balthazard							Ret						0
	(United Kingdom) Chris Cooper								Ret					0
	(Brazil) Nelson Piquet Jr.								Ret					0
	(United Kingdom) Jason Templeman								Ret					0
	(United Kingdom) Marcus Thomas								Ret					0
Pos	Driver	IMO (Italy)	CAT (Spain)	MON (Monaco)	NÜR (Germany)	IND (United States)		MAG (France)	SIL (United Kingdom)	HOC (Germany)	HUN (Hungary)	SPA (Belgium)	MZA (Italy)	Points

Colour	Result
Gold	Winner
Silver	Second place
Bronze	Third place
Green	Points classification
Blue	Non-points classification
Blue	Non-classified finish (NC)
Purple	Retired, not classified (Ret)
Red	Did not qualify (DNQ)
Red	Did not pre-qualify (DNPQ)
Black	Disqualified (DSQ)
White	Did not start (DNS)
White	Withdrew (WD)
White	Race cancelled (C)
Blank	Did not practice (DNP)
Blank	Did not arrive (DNA)
Blank	Excluded (EX)

**Bold** – Pole
Italics – Fastest Lap

† — Drivers did not finish the race, but were classified as they completed over 90% of the race distance.
