= 2003 Porsche Carrera Cup Great Britain =

The 2003 Porsche Carrera Cup Great Britain was the inaugural year for a multi-event, one make motor racing championship held across England and Ireland. The championship featured a mix of professional motor racing teams and privately funded drivers, competing in Porsche 911 GT3 cars that conform to the technical regulations for the championship. It forms part of the extensive program of support categories built up around the BTCC centrepiece.

This season was the inaugural Porsche Carrera Cup Great Britain. The season began on 21 April at Mondello Park and concluded on 21 September at Oulton Park, after ten races, all in support of the 2003 British Touring Car Championship.

Barry Horne became the first drivers' champion, competing with Team Parker Racing, while Team BCR won the Teams' Championship.

== Race calendar and winners ==
All races were held in the United Kingdom (excepting Mondello Park round that held in Ireland).

Round	Circuit	Date	Pole position	Winning driver
R1	Mondello Park	21 April	(Republic of Ireland) Damien Faulkner	(United Kingdom) Barry Horne
R2	Brands Hatch (Indy), Kent	5 May	(United Kingdom) Richard Westbrook	(United Kingdom) Richard Westbrook
R3	Thruxton Circuit, Hampshire	26 May	(United Kingdom) David Pinkney	(United Kingdom) David Pinkney (United Kingdom) Barry Horne
R4	Silverstone Circuit (International), Northamptonshire	8 June	(United Kingdom) Richard Westbrook	(United Kingdom) Richard Westbrook (United Kingdom) Barry Horne
R5	Rockingham Motor Speedway (International Super Sports Car Long), Northamptonshire	22 June	(United Kingdom) Barry Horne	(United Kingdom) Barry Horne
R6	Croft Circuit, North Yorkshire	13 July	(Germany) Mike Rockenfeller	(United Kingdom) Richard Westbrook
R7	Snetterton Circuit, Norfolk	9 August	(United Kingdom) Jason Templeman	(United States) Patrick Long
R8	Brands Hatch (Indy), Kent	25 August	(United Kingdom) Richard Westbrook	(United Kingdom) Richard Westbrook
R9	Donington Park (National), Leicestershire	7 September	(United Kingdom) Richard Westbrook	(United Kingdom) Barry Horne (United Kingdom) Tim Harvey
R10	Oulton Park (Island), Cheshire	21 September	(United Kingdom) Richard Westbrook	(United Kingdom) Jason Templeman

== Championship standings ==
=== Drivers' Championship ===
Points were awarded on a 20, 18, 16, 14, 12, 10, 9, 8, 7, 6, 5, 4, 3, 2, 1 basis to the top 15 finishers in each race, with 1 point for the fastest lap in each race and 1 point for pole position in the first race of each meeting.

Pos	Driver	MON		BHI		THR		SIL		ROC		CRO		SNE		BHI		DON		OUL		Pts
1	(United Kingdom) Barry Horne	**2**	**2**	3	3	2	1	2	1	**1**	**1**	**Ret**	Ret	2	**Ret**	2	3	1	**3**	2	2	333
2	(United Kingdom) Richard Westbrook			**1**	**1**	DSQ	Ret	**1**	**3**	2	2	1	**1**	**3**	8	**1**	**1**	**2**	2	**3**	1	306
3	(United Kingdom) Jason Templeman	3	3	2	2	3	Ret	3	2	NC	5	2	3	4	Ret	3	2	4	4	1	**Ret**	277
4	(United Kingdom) Jonathan Cocker			6	5	4	2	10	9	3	3	5	6	7	4	5	5	5	7	10	8	228
5	(United Kingdom) David Pinkney	6	5	5	6	**1**	**4**	NC	10	6	7	3	4			11	Ret	6	5	4	Ret	199
6	(United Kingdom) Andy Britnell	7	7	8	8	6	6	6	7	5	9	10	10	Ret	Ret	Ret	7	9	8	8	10	169
7	(United Kingdom) David Cuff			9	4	7	5	7	5	4	4			8	3	4	4					157
8	(United Kingdom) Jeremy Smith	4	6	11	10	Ret	Ret	5	6	7	6			5	Ret			8	6	12	6	145
9	(United Kingdom) Gary Britnell	8	8	10	9	8	7	8	8	8	11	8	8	Ret	7	8	Ret	12	10	Ret	Ret	141
10	(United Kingdom) Jonathan Rowland			Ret	Ret	DNS	Ret	Ret	11	Ret	12	6	7	9	5	10	6	Ret	13	15	Ret	86
11	(United Kingdom) Jason Young											9	9	10	6	7	9	11	12	13	12	79
12	(United Kingdom) Colin Broster											7	11							11	9	33
13	(United Kingdom) Mark Cole																	Ret	Ret	6	3	29
14	(United Kingdom) Paul Mace															6	8	10	Ret			26
15	(United Kingdom) Phil Hindley																			9	7	21
16	(United Kingdom) Simon Moulton																	Ret	11	14	11	18
17	(United Kingdom) Nigel Kelly																	13	14			9
	(United Kingdom) Richard Marsh			DNS	DNS																	0
	(United Kingdom) Nigel Rice	WD	WD																			0
guest drivers ineligible for points
	(United States) Patrick Long													**1**	**1**							0
	(Republic of Ireland) Damien Faulkner	**1**	**1**																			0
	(United Kingdom) Tim Harvey			4	Ret													3	1			0
	(United Kingdom) Richard Meadon													6	2							0
	(Germany) Mike Rockenfeller											**DNS**	2									0
	(New Zealand) Aaron Slight					5	3															0
	(United Kingdom) Piers Masarati							4	4													0
	(United Kingdom) Ian Flux	5	4																			0
	(Netherlands) Jurgen van den Goorbergh											4	5									0
	(United Kingdom) Gavin Pyper																			5	4	0
	(United Kingdom) Jonny Kane																			7	5	0
	(United Kingdom) Steve Sutcliffe			7	7																	0
	(United Kingdom) Chris Harris																	7	9			0
	(United Kingdom) Gareth Howell									Ret	8											0
	(United Kingdom) James Mills									9	10											0
	(United Kingdom) Vicki Butler-Henderson															9	10					0
	(United Kingdom) Stuart Gallagher							9	12													0
	(United Kingdom) Tiff Needell															Ret	Ret					0
Pos	Driver	MON		BHI		THR		SIL		ROC		CRO		SNE		BHI		DON		OUL		Pts

Colour	Result
Gold	Winner
Silver	Second place
Bronze	Third place
Green	Points classification
Blue	Non-points classification
Blue	Non-classified finish (NC)
Purple	Retired, not classified (Ret)
Red	Did not qualify (DNQ)
Red	Did not pre-qualify (DNPQ)
Black	Disqualified (DSQ)
White	Did not start (DNS)
White	Withdrew (WD)
White	Race cancelled (C)
Blank	Did not practice (DNP)
Blank	Did not arrive (DNA)
Blank	Excluded (EX)

**Bold** – Pole
Italics – Fastest Lap

=== Teams' Championship ===
Pos	Team	Pts
1	Team BCR	511
2	Redline Racing	402
3	Team Parker Racing	333
4	Team SAS/VLR	310
5	Total Control Racing	277
6	Barwell Motorsport	199
7	High Tech	86
8	Pegasus Motorsport/RPM	71
9	Tech 9	21
