= 1992 Italian Superturismo Championship =

Seasons
- ← 1991 1993 →

The 1992 Italian Superturismo Championship was the sixth edition of the Italian Superturismo Championship. The season began in Monza on 21 March and finished on the same racetrack on 18 October, after ten rounds. Nicola Larini won the S1 Class (Group A cars), driving an Alfa Romeo 155 GTA, while Fabrizio Giovanardi won the S2 Class (Super Touring cars).

== Teams and drivers ==
=== S1 Class ===
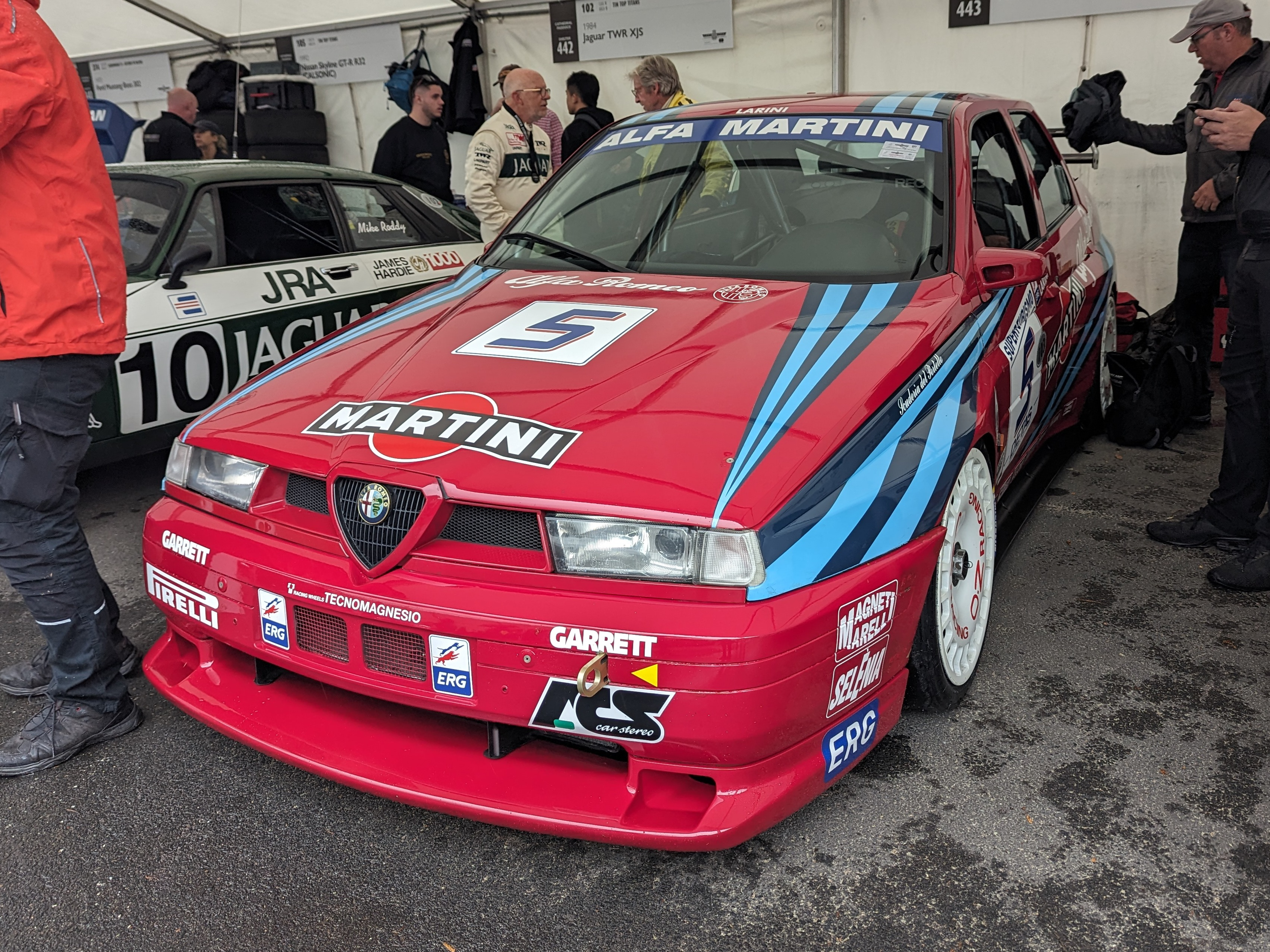
Alfa Romeo 155 GTA of Martini Racing won the 1992 Superturismo, S1 Class with Nicola Larini

Team	Car	No.	Drivers	Rounds
(Germany) Schnitzer Motorsport	BMW M3 Sport Evolution	1	(Italy) Roberto Ravaglia	1, 6, 9-10
(Germany) Schnitzer Motorsport	BMW M3 Sport Evolution	22	(Germany) Joachim Winkelhock	1
(Italy) CiBiEmme Engineering	BMW M3 Sport Evolution	2	(Italy) Emanuele Pirro	1–2, 5, 7
(Italy) CiBiEmme Engineering	BMW M3 Sport Evolution	2	(Switzerland) Andrea Barenghi	3–4, 8
(Italy) CiBiEmme Engineering	BMW M3 Sport Evolution	3	(United Kingdom) Steve Soper	1
(Italy) CiBiEmme Engineering	BMW M3 Sport Evolution	3	(Italy) Gabriele Tarquini	2-10
(Italy) Alfa Corse	Alfa Romeo 155 GTA	4	(Italy) Alessandro Nannini	All
(Italy) Alfa Corse	Alfa Romeo 155 GTA	5	(Italy) Nicola Larini	All
(Italy) Alfa Corse	Alfa Romeo 155 GTA	6	(Italy) Antonio Tamburini	6
(Italy) Alfa Corse	Alfa Romeo 155 GTA	6	(Italy) Luca Cadalora	10
(Italy) Jolly Club	Alfa Romeo 155 GTA	7	(Italy) Antonio Tamburini	1–5, 7-10
(Italy) Jolly Club	Alfa Romeo 155 GTA	8	(Italy) Giorgio Francia	All
(Italy) Jolly Club	Alfa Romeo 155 GTA	9	(Italy) Alessandro Zanardi	6
(Italy) Jolly Club	Alfa Romeo 155 GTA	9	(Italy) Federico d'Amore	6
(Italy) Jolly Club	Alfa Romeo 155 GTA	9	(Italy) Tamara Vidali	10
(Italy) Scuderia Giudici	Alfa Romeo 75 Turbo Evolution	11	(Italy) Gianni Giudici	1, 3, 5–7, 9-10
(Italy) Soli Racing Team	Alfa Romeo 75 Turbo Evolution	12	(Italy) Moreno Soli	All
(Italy) Scuderia San Marco	BMW M3 Sport Evolution	14	(Italy) Ermanno Ronchi	1, 3, 5–6, 9-10
(Italy) Scuderia San Marco	BMW M3 Sport Evolution	15	(Italy) Achille Voltolina	1, 3–5, 7-10
(Italy) Scuderia San Marco	BMW M3 Sport Evolution	?	(Italy) Massimo Piacentini	1
(Italy) Scuderia San Marco	BMW M3 Sport Evolution	?	(Italy) Roberto Del Castello	7
(Italy) AB Motorsport	BMW M3 Sport Evolution	18	(Italy) Marco Antonelli	1–4, 6–7, 9
(Italy) Greyhound Motorsport	Opel Omega 3000 24V Evo500n	19	(Italy) Massimo Pigoli	1-6
(Italy) University Motors	Ford Sierra RS500 Cosworth	21	(Italy) Luca Canni Ferrari	1–7, 9-10
(Italy) Top Run	Alfa Romeo 75 Turbo Evolution	23	(Italy) Roberto Russo	5–8, 10
(Italy) Bora Racing Team	Alfa Romeo 75 Turbo Evolution	24	(Italy) Rinaldo Capello	3
?	Alfa Romeo 75 Turbo Evolution	24	(Italy) Eugenio Corsini	5, 8-10
(Italy) Motorsport Italia Racing	Alfa Romeo 75 Turbo Evolution	25	(Italy) Giovanni Bonanno	2-4
(Italy) Motorsport Italia Racing	Alfa Romeo 75 Turbo Evolution	25	(Italy) Stefano Buttiero	8-10
(Italy) Repetto Motors	Ford Escort RS Cosworth	31	(Brazil) Roberto Moreno	8-10
(Italy) Repetto Motors	Ford Escort RS Cosworth	32	(Italy) Battistino Pregliasco	8-10
(Italy) Conti Racing	Renault 21 Turbo	35	(Italy) Franco de Angelis	10
(Italy) Conti Racing	Renault 21 Turbo	36	(Italy) Maurizio Pitorri	10
?	Alfa Romeo 75 Turbo Evolution	?	(Italy) Ernesto Vita	5
(Italy) Imberti Racing Team	Ford Sierra RS500 Cosworth	?	(Italy) Guido Ghislotti	9
(Italy) Imberti Racing Team	Ford Sierra RS500 Cosworth	?	(Italy) Walter Santus	10
?	Alfa Romeo 75 Turbo Evolution	?	(Italy) Alberto Gatti	10

=== S2 Class ===
Team	Car	No.	Drivers	Rounds
(Italy) Peugeot Talbot Sport	Peugeot 405	51	(Italy) Fabrizio Giovanardi	1-9
(Italy) Peugeot Talbot Sport	Peugeot 405	52	(United Kingdom) Gary Ayles	All
(Italy) Peugeot Talbot Sport	Peugeot 405	53	(Italy) Luigi Giorgio	1–2, 4-9
(Italy) Audi Sport Europa	Volkswagen Golf	54	(Italy) Giuseppe Gabbiani	All
(Italy) 2G Racing	Volkswagen Golf	55	(Italy) Alessandra Persichetti	5, 7
(Italy) Technica Racing Team	Alfa Romeo 33	56	(Italy) Rocco Peduzzi	1, 3
(Italy) Technica Racing Team	Alfa Romeo 33	82	(Italy) Rinaldo Drovandi	3–5, 8, 10
(Italy) Lella Lombardi Autosport	Opel Kadett	57	(Italy) Roberto Macchi	1-3
(Italy) Lella Lombardi Autosport	Opel Calibra	62	(Italy) Roberto Castagna	3–5, 7–8, 10
(Italy) Conrero Squadra Corse	Opel Calibra	58	(Italy) Stefano Buttiero	1, 3-6
(Italy) Conrero Squadra Corse	Opel Kadett	65	(Italy) Filippo Salvarani	1-5
(Italy) Conrero Squadra Corse	Opel Calibra	65	(Italy) Filippo Salvarani	6-10
(Italy) Conrero Squadra Corse	Opel Kadett	?	(Italy) Aldo Bertuzzi	7
(Italy) A-Team Racing	BMW M3	59	(Italy) Luca Maggiorelli	2–7, 9
(Italy) Castelfranco Racing	BMW M3	61	(Italy) Graziano Rossi	3–6, 9-10
(Italy) Castelfranco Racing	BMW M3	69	(Italy) Maurizio Lusuardi	1–5, 7-10
(Italy) Trivellato Racing	BMW M3	63	(Italy) Mauro Trione	1-5
(Italy) ProminvesTeam	Opel Kadett	64	(Italy) Paolo Guaitamacchi	1, 3–6, 8, 10
(Italy) Paon Motorsport	Vauxhall Astra	67	(Italy) Giancarlo Naddeo	1, 3–4, 6
(Italy) Tecno Racing	BMW M3	68	(Italy) Claudio Melotto	1–7, 9-10
(Italy) Santucci Motorsport	BMW M3	84	(Italy) Massimiliano Crinelli	9
?	BMW M3	?	(Italy) Rocco Peduzzi	7, 10
?	Opel Calibra	?	(Italy) Raffaele di Bari	7-10
?	Opel Kadett	?	(Italy) Angelo Rossito	8
?	BMW M3	?	(Italy) Massimo Pigoli	9
?	Volkswagen Golf	?	(Italy) Augusto Rossetti	10

== Race calendar and results ==
Round		Circuit	Date	Pole position	Fastest lap	Winning driver	Winning team	S2 Winner
1	R1	(Italy) Autodromo Nazionale Monza	21 March	(Italy) Nicola Larini	(Italy) Alessandro Nannini	(Italy) Roberto Ravaglia	(Germany) Schnitzer Motorsport	(Italy) Fabrizio Giovanardi (Italy) Filippo Salvarani^{1}
1	R2	(Italy) Autodromo Nazionale Monza	22 March		(Italy) Nicola Larini	(Italy) Nicola Larini	(Italy) Alfa Corse	(Italy) Filippo Salvarani
2	R1	(Italy) Autodromo dell'Umbria	11 April	(Italy) Emanuele Pirro	(Italy) Giorgio Francia	(Italy) Giorgio Francia	(Italy) Jolly Club	(Italy) Fabrizio Giovanardi
2	R2	(Italy) Autodromo dell'Umbria	12 April		(Italy) Emanuele Pirro	(Italy) Emanuele Pirro	(Italy) CiBiEmme Engineering	(Italy) Fabrizio Giovanardi
3	R1	(Italy) Autodromo Internazionale del Mugello	9 May	(Italy) Nicola Larini	(Italy) Nicola Larini	(Italy) Alessandro Nannini	(Italy) Alfa Corse	(Italy) Fabrizio Giovanardi
3	R2	(Italy) Autodromo Internazionale del Mugello	10 May		(Italy) Nicola Larini	(Italy) Alessandro Nannini	(Italy) Alfa Corse	(Italy) Fabrizio Giovanardi
4	R1	(Italy) Autodromo del Levante	23 May	(Italy) Nicola Larini	(Italy) Nicola Larini	(Italy) Nicola Larini	(Italy) Alfa Corse	(Italy) Luca Maggiorelli
4	R2	(Italy) Autodromo del Levante	24 May		(Italy) Nicola Larini	(Italy) Nicola Larini	(Italy) Alfa Corse	(Italy) Fabrizio Giovanardi
5	R1	(Italy) ACI Vallelunga Circuit	6 June	(Italy) Nicola Larini	(Italy) Nicola Larini	(Italy) Nicola Larini	(Italy) Alfa Corse	(Italy) Fabrizio Giovanardi
5	R2	(Italy) ACI Vallelunga Circuit	7 June		(Italy) Nicola Larini	(Italy) Nicola Larini	(Italy) Alfa Corse	(Italy) Luca Maggiorelli
6	R1	(Italy) Autodromo Enzo e Dino Ferrari	20 June	(Italy) Antonio Tamburini	(Italy) Alessandro Nannini	(Italy) Nicola Larini	(Italy) Alfa Corse	(Italy) Fabrizio Giovanardi
6	R2	(Italy) Autodromo Enzo e Dino Ferrari	21 June		(Italy) Antonio Tamburini	(Italy) Nicola Larini	(Italy) Alfa Corse	(Italy) Fabrizio Giovanardi
7	R1	(Italy) Circuito Internazionale Santamonica	18 July	(Italy) Nicola Larini	(Italy) Nicola Larini	(Italy) Nicola Larini	(Italy) Alfa Corse	(Italy) Fabrizio Giovanardi
7	R2	(Italy) Circuito Internazionale Santamonica	19 July		(Italy) Nicola Larini	(Italy) Nicola Larini	(Italy) Alfa Corse	(Italy) Fabrizio Giovanardi
8	R1	(Italy) Autodromo di Pergusa	5 September	(Italy) Nicola Larini	(Italy) Alessandro Nannini	(Italy) Giorgio Francia	(Italy) Jolly Club	(Italy) Fabrizio Giovanardi
8	R2	(Italy) Autodromo di Pergusa	6 September		(Italy) Giorgio Francia	(Italy) Giorgio Francia	(Italy) Jolly Club	(Italy) Filippo Salvarani
9	R1	(Italy) Autodromo Riccardo Paletti	3 October	(Italy) Alessandro Nannini	(Italy) Nicola Larini	(Italy) Alessandro Nannini	(Italy) Alfa Corse	(Italy) Luca Maggiorelli
9	R2	(Italy) Autodromo Riccardo Paletti	4 October		(Italy) Roberto Ravaglia	(Italy) Roberto Ravaglia	(Germany) Schnitzer Motorsport	(United Kingdom) Gary Ayles
10	R1	(Italy) Autodromo Nazionale Monza	17 October	(Italy) Alessandro Nannini	(Italy) Alessandro Nannini	(Italy) Alessandro Nannini	(Italy) Alfa Corse	(Italy) Filippo Salvarani
10	R2	(Italy) Autodromo Nazionale Monza	18 October		(Italy) Alessandro Nannini	(Italy) Antonio Tamburini	(Italy) Jolly Club	(Italy) Giuseppe Gabbiani

Notes:

- ^1 - Fabrizio Giovanardi and Filippo Salvarani were declared winners ex-aequo.

== Championship standings ==
Scoring system

Position	1st	2nd	3rd	4th	5th	6th	7th	8th	9th	10th
Points	20	15	12	10	8	6	4	3	2	1

=== S1 Class ===
Pos	Driver	MON (Italy)		MAG (Italy)		MUG (Italy)		BIN (Italy)		VAL (Italy)		IMO (Italy)		MIS (Italy)		PER (Italy)		VAR (Italy)		MON (Italy)		Pts
1	(Italy) Nicola Larini	**Ret**	1	2	3	**Ret**	2	**1**	**1**	**1**	**1**	1	**1**	**1**	**1**	**4**	Ret	2	2	4	3	284
2	(Italy) Giorgio Francia	2	2	1	**2**	(4)	3	2	2	3	4	2	4	3	(5)	1	**1**	3	3	2	2	260
3	(Italy) Alessandro Nannini	6	12	5	4	1	**1**	4	3	2	2	3	2	Ret	4	2	Ret	**1**	**5**	**1**	**4**	226
4	(Italy) Antonio Tamburini	5	13	6	5	3	4	3	4	5	5	**Ret**	5	2	2	3	2	5	4	3	1	197
5	(Italy) Gabriele Tarquini			4	Ret	2	5	11	Ret	6	11	4	Ret	4	3	5	Ret	6	11	7	13	89
6	(Italy) Emanuele Pirro	4	3	**3**	1					4	3			Ret	6							82
7	(Italy) Roberto Ravaglia	1	**Ret**									5	3					7	1	6	Ret	70
8	(Italy) Moreno Soli	7	5	9	8	Ret	Ret	9	6	8	6	10	Ret	7	9	7	4	10	8	10	Ret	60
9	(Italy) Luca Canni Ferrari	11	Ret	7	6	8	11	6	Ret	11	8	9	7	6	8			9	7	14	Ret	43
10	(Switzerland) Andrea Barenghi					5	6	5	5							Ret	3					42
11	(Brazil) Roberto Moreno															10	5	4	6	5	5	41
12	(Italy) Gianni Giudici	8	8			Ret	9			9	7	8	Ret	5	7			13	13	Ret	8	32
13	(Italy) Marco Antonelli	Ret	DNS	Ret	7	6	7	7	7			7	Ret	9	12			DNS	DNS			28
14	(Italy) Achille Voltolina	12	7			7	8	12	9	12	Ret			11	Ret	9	6	12	9	12	10	24
15	(Italy) Massimo Pigoli	9	6	8	Ret	Ret	Ret	10	Ret	7	Ret	11	8									19
16	(United Kingdom) Steve Soper	3	9																			14
17	(Italy) Battistino Pregliasco															Ret	7	8	Ret	8	9	12
18	(Germany) Joachim Winkelhock	14	4																			10
19	(Italy) Roberto Russo									13	9	Ret	DNS	10	10	6	Ret			15	Ret	10
20	(Italy) Giovanni Bonanno			10	9	Ret	Ret	8	8													9
21	(Italy) Ermanno Ronchi	10	11			9	Ret			10	10	12	9					Ret	DNS	Ret	11	7
22	(Italy) Luca Cadalora																			11	6	6
23	(Italy) Federico d'Amore												6									6
24	(Italy) Alessandro Zanardi											6										6
25	(Italy) Stefano Buttiero															11	Ret	11	Ret	9	7	6
26	(Italy) Eugenio Corsini									15	12					8	8	Ret	12	Ret	12	6
27	(Italy) Roberto Del Castello													8	11							3
28	(Italy) Massimo Piacentini	13	10																			1
29	(Italy) Guido Ghislotti																	Ret	10			1
30	(Italy) Rinaldo Capello					Ret	10															1
	(Italy) Ernesto Vita									14	13											0
	(Italy) Tamara Vidali																			13	Ret	0
	(Italy) Walter Santus																			17	14	0
	(Italy) Maurizio Pitorri																				15	0
	(Italy) Franco de Angelis																			16		0
	(Italy) Alberto Gatti																			18	Ret	0
Pos	Driver	MON (Italy)		MAG (Italy)		MUG (Italy)		BIN (Italy)		VAL (Italy)		IMO (Italy)		MIS (Italy)		PER (Italy)		VAR (Italy)		MON (Italy)		Pts

Colour	Result
Gold	Winner
Silver	Second place
Bronze	Third place
Green	Points classification
Blue	Non-points classification
Blue	Non-classified finish (NC)
Purple	Retired, not classified (Ret)
Red	Did not qualify (DNQ)
Red	Did not pre-qualify (DNPQ)
Black	Disqualified (DSQ)
White	Did not start (DNS)
White	Withdrew (WD)
White	Race cancelled (C)
Blank	Did not practice (DNP)
Blank	Did not arrive (DNA)
Blank	Excluded (EX)

**Bold** – Pole
Italics – Fastest Lap

=== S2 Class ===
Pos	Driver	MON (Italy)		MAG (Italy)		MUG (Italy)		BIN (Italy)		VAL (Italy)		IMO (Italy)		MIS (Italy)		PER (Italy)		VAR (Italy)		MON (Italy)		Pts
1	(Italy) Fabrizio Giovanardi	1^{1}	DSQ	1	1	1	1	2	1	1	2	1	1	1	1	1	Ret	9	Ret			**260**^{2}
2	(United Kingdom) Gary Ayles	3	Ret	Ret	8	3	Ret	3	3	Ret	3	3	3	4	2	2	2	2	1	2	Ret	**192**
3	(Italy) Filippo Salvarani	1^{1}	1	6	Ret	9	4	11	5	10	Ret	2	2	2	Ret	3	1	6	11	1	Ret	**167,5**
4	(Italy) Luca Maggiorelli			DSQ	3	Ret	DNS	1	2	3	1	4	Ret	3	3			1	2			**148**
5	(Italy) Luigi Giorgio	4	DSQ	2	2			4	4	2	4	6	4	Ret	4	Ret	3	Ret	5			**126**^{2}
6	(Italy) Giuseppe Gabbiani	7	4	3	Ret	Ret	DNS	Ret	Ret	8	Ret	5	Ret	9	5	4	Ret	Ret	3	3	1	**101**
7	(Italy) Claudio Melotto	11	6	5	5	7	Ret	7	8	11	7	9	6	Ret	9			4	4	7	4	**81**
8	(Italy) Stefano Buttiero	8	Ret	Ret	4	2	2	5	Ret	6	8	8	Ret									**63**
9	(Italy) Graziano Rossi					4	3	13	7	4	6	Ret	5					8	9	6	Ret	**61**
10	(Italy) Maurizio Lusuardi	10	Ret	7	Ret	8	6	10	11	5	5			Ret	7	6	5	5	10	9	Ret	**60**
11	(Italy) Mauro Trione	9	5	4	6	6	7	6	6	DNS	DNS											**48**
12	(Italy) Giancarlo Naddeo	6	2			Ret	5	8	Ret			7	Ret									**36**
13	(Italy) Rocco Peduzzi	13	Ret			Ret	DNS							6	8					4	2	**34**
14	(Italy) Roberto Macchi	5	3	Ret	7	5	Ret															**32**
15	(Italy) Roberto Castagna					Ret	Ret	9	10	7	9			7	11	Ret	4			10	Ret	**24**
16	(Italy) Paolo Guaitamacchi	12	Ret			Ret	Ret	Ret	9	12	11	Ret	Ret			Ret	Ret			5	3	**22**
17	(Italy) Raffaele di Bari													8	Ret	5	Ret	10	7	8	Ret	**19**
18	(Italy) Massimiliano Crinelli																	3	8			**15**
19	(Italy) Aldo Bertuzzi													5	6							**14**
20	(Italy) Massimo Pigoli																	7	6			**10**
21	(Italy) Angelo Rossito															Ret	6					**6**
22	(Italy) Rinaldo Drovandi					Ret	8	12	Ret	Ret	10					Ret	Ret			12	Ret	**4**
23	(Italy) Alessandra Persichetti									9	Ret			Ret	10							**3**
	(Italy) Augusto Rossetti																			11	Ret	**0**
Pos	Driver	MON (Italy)		MAG (Italy)		MUG (Italy)		BIN (Italy)		VAL (Italy)		IMO (Italy)		MIS (Italy)		PER (Italy)		VAR (Italy)		MON (Italy)		Pts

Colour	Result
Gold	Winner
Silver	Second place
Bronze	Third place
Green	Points classification
Blue	Non-points classification
Blue	Non-classified finish (NC)
Purple	Retired, not classified (Ret)
Red	Did not qualify (DNQ)
Red	Did not pre-qualify (DNPQ)
Black	Disqualified (DSQ)
White	Did not start (DNS)
White	Withdrew (WD)
White	Race cancelled (C)
Blank	Did not practice (DNP)
Blank	Did not arrive (DNA)
Blank	Excluded (EX)

**Bold** – Pole
Italics – Fastest Lap

Notes:

- **^1** - Fabrizio Giovanardi and Filippo Salvarani were declared winners ex-aequo.
- **^2** - Fabrizio Giovanardi and Luigi Giorgio were disqualified from the second race of the first Monza round and their race-1 points were halved.
