= Andy Wallace (racing driver) =

British racing driver (born 1961)

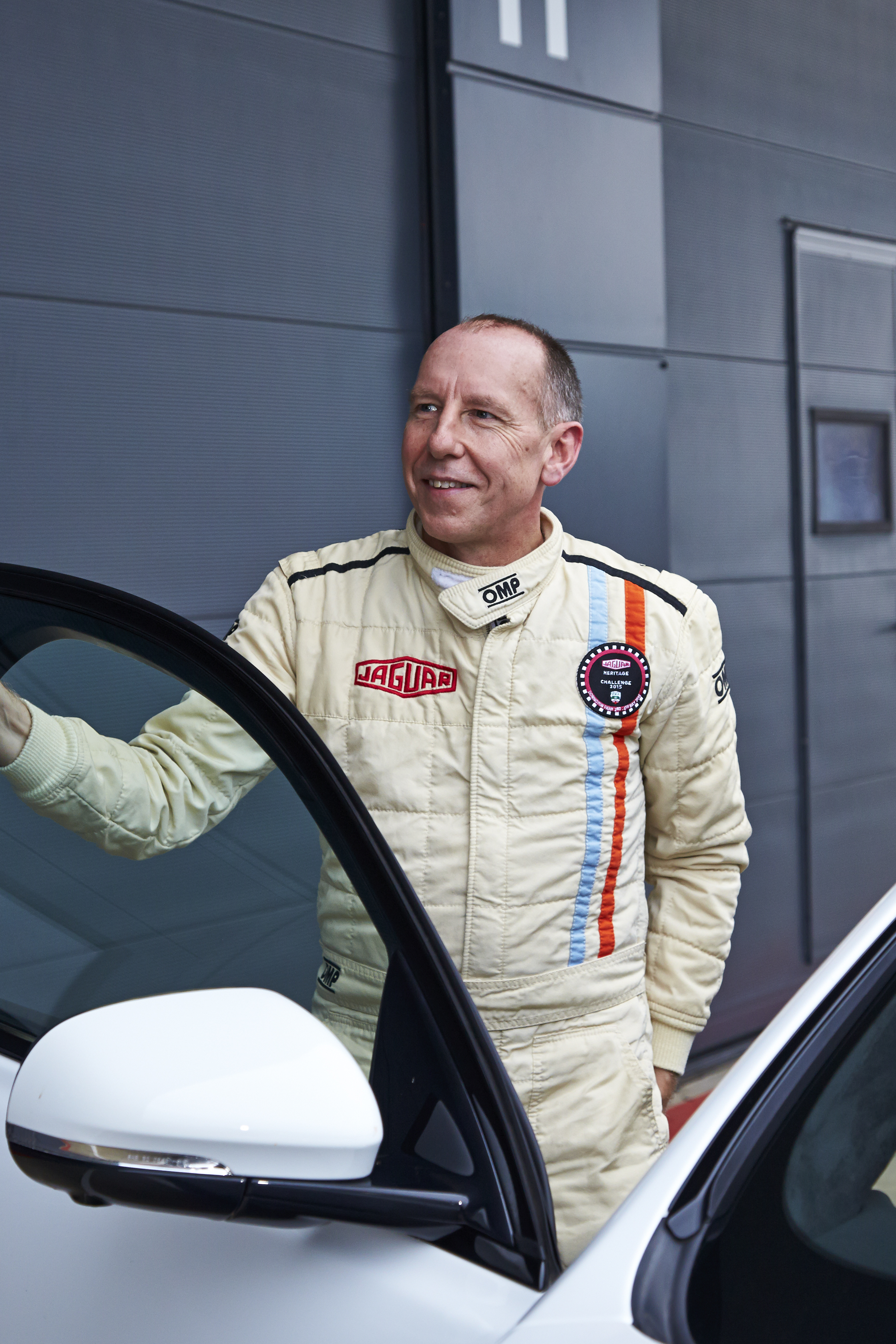
- Wallace in 2015
- Nationality: (United Kingdom) British
- Born: Andrew Steven Wallace; 19 February 1961 (age 65); Oxford, England

24 Hours of Le Mans career
- Years: 1988 - 1993, 1995 – 2008, 2010
- Teams: Silk Cut Jaguar; Toyota Team Tom's; Harrods Mach One Racing; David Price Racing; Panoz Motorsports; Audi Sport UK; Team Cadillac; Team Bentley; Racing for Holland; Zytek Engineering; Creation Autosportif; RML
- Best finish: 1st (1988)
- Class wins: 4 (1988, 2001, 2002, 2006)

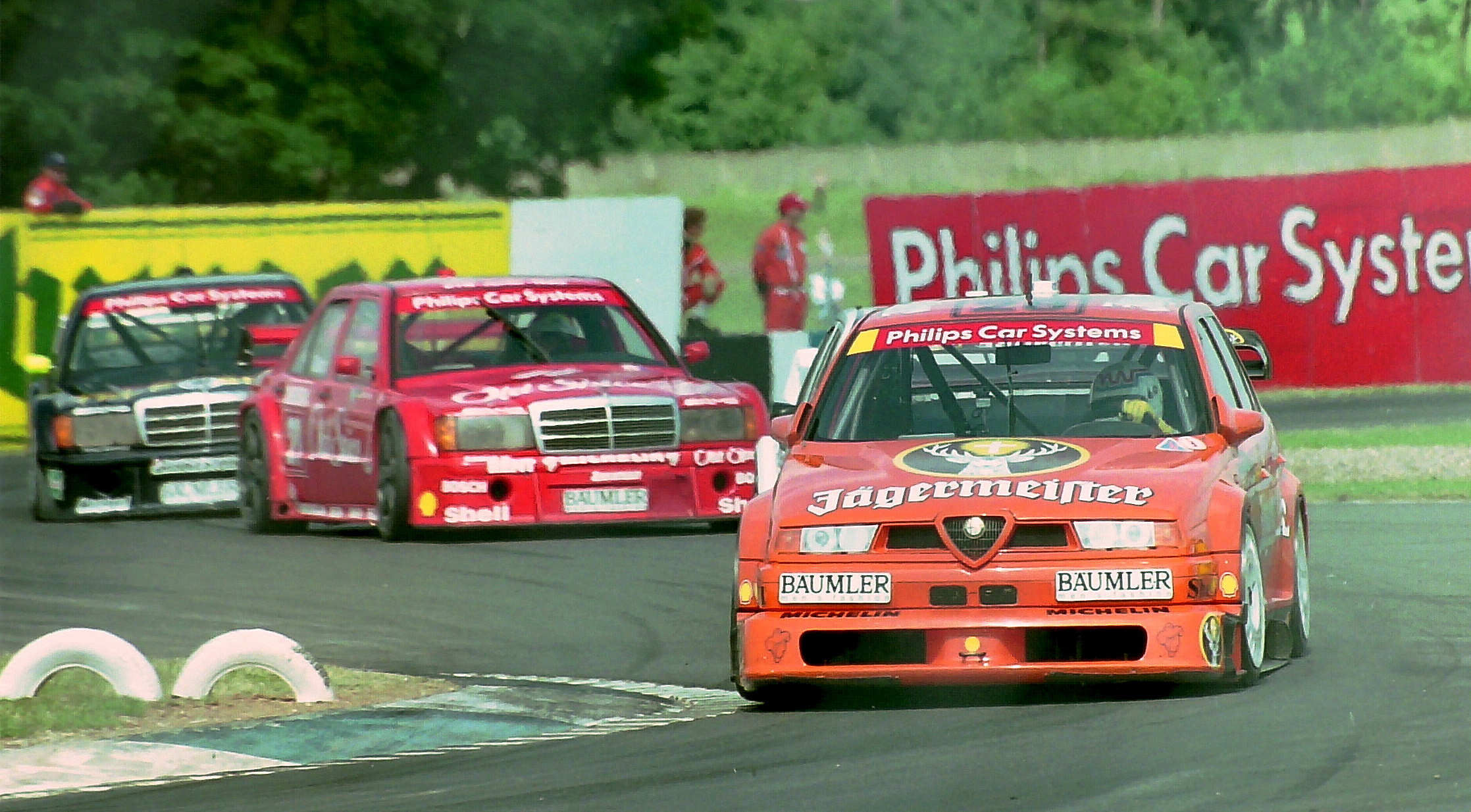
Andy Wallace - Team Jagermeister-Schubel - Alfa Romeo 155 V6 TI 93, Donington DTM 1994

Andrew Steven Wallace (born 19 February 1961) is a professional racing driver from the United Kingdom, who has been racing since 1979.

== Biography ==
In 1976, Wallace attended the Jim Russell Racing Drivers' School. He is the current official Bugatti test driver. He has raced prototype sports cars since 1988, becoming the sixth driver to complete the informal triple Crown of endurance racing, and winning over 25 International Sports car races including:

- 24 Hours of Le Mans
- 24 Hours of Daytona (three times)
- 12 Hours of Sebring (two times)
- Petit Le Mans 1,000 miles (1,600 km).

Wallace was also the driver for the then record-setting speed of 386.4 km/h (240.1 mph) in a McLaren F1, which for over 11 years was the world record for the fastest production car. According to the Autosport's Le Mans supplement, he liked the place so much that he became resident there.

Wallace drove for Dyson Racing in the American Le Mans Series through the 2007 racing season.

In January 2008, Wallace drove for Alex Job Racing in the #23 Porsche-powered Daytona Prototype backed by Ruby Tuesday in the 24 Hours of Daytona, finishing in 36th place with engine problems.

On 2 August 2019, Wallace set a record of 300 mph in a Bugatti Chiron Super Sport 300+. It was revealed by Top Gear on 2 September in a Youtube video, showing a certified speed of 490.48 km/h (304.77 mph) and happened on the Ehra-Lessien test track owned by VW.

== Racing record ==
=== Complete British Formula 3 results ===
(key) (Races in bold indicate pole position) (Races in italics indicate fastest lap)

Year	Team	Engine	Class	1	2	3	4	5	6	7	8	9	10	11	12	13	14	15	16	17	18	DC	Pts
1985	Swallow Racing	VW	A	SIL; 1	THR; DNS	SIL; 2	THR; 3	DON; 1	ZOL; 2	THR; 2	THR; 1	SIL; 6	BRH; Ret	SIL; 14	DON; 4	SNE; 6	OUL; Ret	SIL; 2	SPA; 3	ZAN; 2	SIL; 2	2nd	76
1986	Madgwick Motorsport	VW	A	**THR**; 2	SIL; 1	THR; 7	SIL; 3	**BRH**; 1	THR; 2	DON; Ret	**SIL**; 2	**SIL**; 1	**OUL**; 2	**ZAN**; 1	**DON**; 2	**SNE**; Ret	**SIL**; 2	**BRH**; 1	**SPA**; 1	**ZOL**; 1	**SIL**; 1	1st	121

=== Complete Japanese Formula 3 results ===
(key) (Races in bold indicate pole position) (Races in italics indicate fastest lap)

Year	Team	Engine	1	2	3	4	5	6	7	8	9	10	DC	Pts
1987	TOM'S	Toyota	SUZ	TSU	FUJ	SUZ; 6	SUG; 15	SEN; 1	NIS; 14	TSU	SUZ	SUZ; 16	8th	26

=== 24 Hours of Le Mans results ===
Year	Team	Co-Drivers	Car	Class	Laps	Pos.	Class Pos.
1988	(United Kingdom) Silk Cut Jaguar (United Kingdom) Tom Walkinshaw Racing	(Netherlands) Jan Lammers (United Kingdom) Johnny Dumfries	Jaguar XJR-9LM	C1	394	**1st**	**1st**
1989	(United Kingdom) Silk Cut Jaguar (United Kingdom) Tom Walkinshaw Racing	(Denmark) John Nielsen (United States) Price Cobb	Jaguar XJR-9LM	C1	215	DNF	DNF
1990	(United Kingdom) Silk Cut Jaguar (United Kingdom) Tom Walkinshaw Racing	(Netherlands) Jan Lammers (Austria) Franz Konrad	Jaguar XJR-12	C1	355	**2nd**	**2nd**
1991	(United Kingdom) Silk Cut Jaguar (United Kingdom) Tom Walkinshaw Racing	(United Kingdom) Derek Warwick (Denmark) John Nielsen	Jaguar XJR-12	C2	356	4th	4th
1992	(Japan) Toyota Team Tom's	(Netherlands) Jan Lammers (Italy) Teo Fabi	Toyota TS010	C1	331	8th	5th
1993	(Japan) Toyota Team Tom's	(France) Pierre-Henri Raphanel (United Kingdom) Kenny Acheson	Toyota TS010	C1	212	DNF	DNF
1995	(United Kingdom) Harrods Mach One Racing (United Kingdom) David Price Racing	(United Kingdom) Derek Bell (United Kingdom) Justin Bell	McLaren F1 GTR	GT1	296	**3rd**	**2nd**
1996	(United Kingdom) Harrods Mach One Racing (United Kingdom) David Price Racing	(France) Olivier Grouillard (United Kingdom) Derek Bell	McLaren F1 GTR	GT1	328	6th	5th
1997	(United Kingdom) David Price Racing	(United Kingdom) James Weaver (United States) Butch Leitzinger	Panoz Esperante GTR-1	GT1	236	DNF	DNF
1998	(United States) Panoz Motorsports	(Australia) David Brabham (United Kingdom) Jamie Davies	Panoz Esperante GTR-1	GT1	335	7th	7th
1999	(United Kingdom) Audi Sport UK Ltd.	(United Kingdom) James Weaver (United Kingdom) Perry McCarthy	Audi R8C	LMGTP	198	DNF	DNF
2000	(United States) Team Cadillac	(France) Franck Lagorce (United States) Butch Leitzinger	Cadillac Northstar LMP	LMP900	291	21st	11th
2001	(United Kingdom) Team Bentley	(Belgium) Eric van de Poele (United States) Butch Leitzinger	Bentley EXP Speed 8	LMGTP	306	**3rd**	**1st**
2002	(United Kingdom) Team Bentley	(Belgium) Eric van de Poele (United States) Butch Leitzinger	Bentley EXP Speed 8	LMGTP	362	4th	**1st**
2003	(Netherlands) Racing for Holland	(Netherlands) Jan Lammers (Netherlands) John Bosch	Dome S101-Judd	LMP900	360	6th	4th
2004	(United Kingdom) Zytek Engineering	(Australia) David Brabham (Japan) Hayanari Shimoda	Zytek 04S	LMP1	167	DNF	DNF
2005	(United Kingdom) Creation Autosportif	(France) Nicolas Minassian (United Kingdom) Jamie Campbell-Walter	DBA 03S-Judd	LMP1	322	14th	7th
2006	(United Kingdom) Ray Mallock Ltd.	(United Kingdom) Mike Newton (Brazil) Thomas Erdos	MG-Lola EX264-AER	LMP2	343	8th	**1st**
2007	(United Kingdom) Ray Mallock Ltd.	(United Kingdom) Mike Newton (Brazil) Thomas Erdos	MG-Lola EX264-AER	LMP2	251	DNF	DNF
2008	(United Kingdom) Ray Mallock Ltd.	(United Kingdom) Mike Newton (Brazil) Thomas Erdos	MG-Lola EX265-AER	LMP2	100	DNF	DNF
2010	(United Kingdom) RML	(United Kingdom) Mike Newton (Brazil) Thomas Erdos	Lola B08/80-HPD	LMP2	358	8th	**3rd**

=== Complete Asia-Pacific Touring Car Championship results ===
(key) (Races in bold indicate pole position) (Races in italics indicate fastest lap)

Year	Team	Car	1	2	3	4	DC	Points
1988	(Australia) Holden Special Vehicles	Holden VL Commodore SS Group A SV	BAT	WEL; Ret	PUK	FJI	NC	0

=== Complete British Touring Car Championship results ===
(key) (Races in bold indicate pole position) (Races in italics indicate fastest lap)

Year	Team	Car	1	2	3	4	5	6	7	8	9	10	11	12	13	14	15	16	17	Pos	Pts
1993	Team Dynamics	BMW 318is	SIL	DON	SNE	DON	OUL; 11	BRH; 1	BRH; 2	PEM	SIL	KNO; 1	KNO; 2	OUL	BRH	THR	DON; 1	DON; 2	SIL	NC	0

=== Complete Deutsche Tourenwagen Meisterschaft results ===
(key) (Races in bold indicate pole position) (Races in italics indicate fastest lap)

Year	Team	Car	1	2	3	4	5	6	7	8	9	10	11	12	13	14	15	16	17	18	19	20	21	22	23	24	Pos.	Pts
1994	Schübel Engineering	Alfa Romeo 155 V6 Ti	ZOL; 1 DNS	ZOL; 2 DNS	HOC; 1 Ret	HOC; 2; 15	NÜR; 1; 16	NÜR; 2; 20	MUG; 1; 14	MUG; 2 Ret	NÜR; 1; 11	NÜR; 2 Ret	NOR; 1 Ret	NOR; 2 DNS	DON; 1; 13	DON; 2; 5	DIE; 1	DIE; 2	NÜR; 1	NÜR; 2	AVU; 1	AVU; 2	ALE; 1	ALE; 2	HOC; 1	HOC; 2	NC	0

Awards and achievements
Preceded by Andy Rouse	Autosport; National Racing Driver of the Year; 1986	Succeeded by Johnny Herbert
Sporting positions
Preceded by Maurício Gugelmin	British Formula Three Champion; 1986	Succeeded by Johnny Herbert
Preceded by Maurício Gugelmin	Macau Grand Prix; Winner; 1986	Succeeded by Martin Donnelly
Preceded by Derek Bell; Hans-Joachim Stuck; Al Holbert	Winner of the 24 Hours of Le Mans; 1988 with: Jan Lammers; Johnny Dumfries	Succeeded by Jochen Mass; Manuel Reuter; Stanley Dickens
