= Nicola Larini =

Italian racing driver (born 1964)

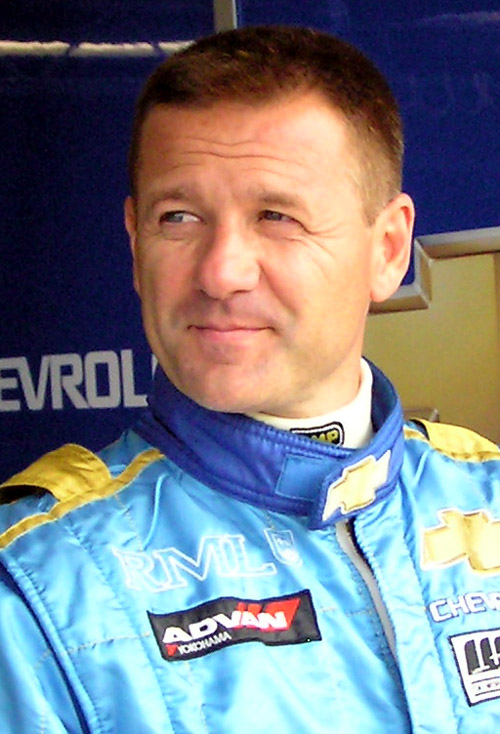
- Larini in 2006
- Born: Nicola Giuseppe Larini; 19 March 1964 (age 62); Lido di Camaiore, Tuscany, Italy

Formula One World Championship career
- Nationality: (Italy) Italian
- Active years: 1987–1992, 1994, 1997
- Team(s): Coloni, Osella, Ligier, Modena, Ferrari, Sauber
- Entries: 75 (49 starts)
- Championships: 0
- Wins: 0
- Podiums: 1
- Career points: 7
- Pole positions: 0
- Fastest laps: 0
- First entry: 1987 Italian Grand Prix
- Last entry: 1997 Monaco Grand Prix

World Touring Car Championship career
- Years active: 1987, 2005–2009
- Teams: Alfa Romeo, Chevrolet
- Starts: 109
- Championships: 0
- Wins: 1
- Podiums: 14
- Poles: 2
- Fastest laps: 2
- Best finish: 5th in 2007

European Touring Car Championship career
- Years active: 2000–2003
- Teams: Nordauto
- Starts: 79
- Championships: 0
- Wins: 8
- Podiums: 38
- Poles: 10
- Fastest laps: 10
- Best finish: 2nd in 2001

DTM career
- Years active: 1993–1995
- Teams: Alfa Romeo
- Starts: 58
- Championships: 1 (1993)
- Wins: 14
- Podiums: 26
- Poles: 13
- Fastest laps: 17

Italian Superturismo Championship career
- Years active: 1992, 1998–1999
- Teams: Alfa Romeo, Nordauto
- Starts: 60
- Championships: 1 (1992)
- Wins: 15
- Podiums: 41
- Poles: 16
- Fastest laps: 16
- Best finish: 1st in 1992 (S1)

Nicola Giuseppe Larini (born 19 March 1964) is an Italian former racing driver, who competed in Formula One between 1987 and 1997. (Note: The exact years Larini competed in Formula One: 1987–1992, 1994, 1997.) In touring car racing, Larini won the Deutsche Tourenwagen Meisterschaft in 1993 and the Italian Superturismo Championship in 1992, both with Alfa Romeo.

Larini participated in 75 Formula One Grands Prix, debuting at the 1987 Italian Grand Prix. He finished second in the tragic 1994 San Marino Grand Prix as a substitute for Ferrari, but only scored points once more in his career. He enjoyed greater success in touring car racing, primarily for Alfa Romeo.

== Early career ==
Born in Lido di Camaiore, Tuscany, Larini began car racing in Formula Italia in 1983, then moved up to Formula Abarth in 1984, placing third overall. He also started in Italian Formula Three the same season. In 1986, he won the title for Coloni in a Dallara, and briefly drove for the same team in Formula 3000 the following year.

== Formula One ==
Larini's rapid ascendancy in motorsport continued when Coloni entered the final two European rounds of the 1987 Formula One season. Larini failed to qualify for the Italian Grand Prix, but got into the Spanish Grand Prix, only to retire early on.

For the 1988 season, Larini was signed by the Osella Formula One team, and drew good notices for his valiant performances in the hugely uncompetitive car, with a best result of 9th in the Monaco Grand Prix. He would continue with Osella in the 1989 season, their much-improved car suffering from the lottery of pre-qualifying. However, Larini continued to shine, running 6th at the San Marino Grand Prix until a hub failure, and running third at the Canadian Grand Prix until an electrical failure. He would also qualify tenth for the Japanese Grand Prix.

The 1990 Formula One season saw a move up the grid to the Ligier team, but the well-funded French team were at a creative dead-end and the car was a distinct midfielder. A brace of seventh places were Larini's best results in a low-key year, although he easily outshone Philippe Alliot in the other Ligier.

Larini then moved to the new Modena team for the 1991 season, once again having to face pre-qualifying. He got through in the opening round, the United States Grand Prix, and held on for seventh place, but the team would develop acute financial difficulties, and were unable to progress. As a result, Larini would only qualify for four more races.

For the 1992 season, Larini was out of luck for a Grand Prix drive, but was signed by Ferrari to develop their active suspension system. Larini kept his racing instincts sharp by winning the Italian Touring Car Championship for Alfa Romeo, and was called up to the Ferrari Formula One team for the end of the year, replacing Ivan Capelli to race-test the active suspension car. He made a fair impression, but started both races from the back of the grid for technical reasons. However, 1993 saw more Ferrari testing and touring cars, this time taking the Deutsche Tourenwagen Meisterschaft title in Germany for Alfa Romeo.

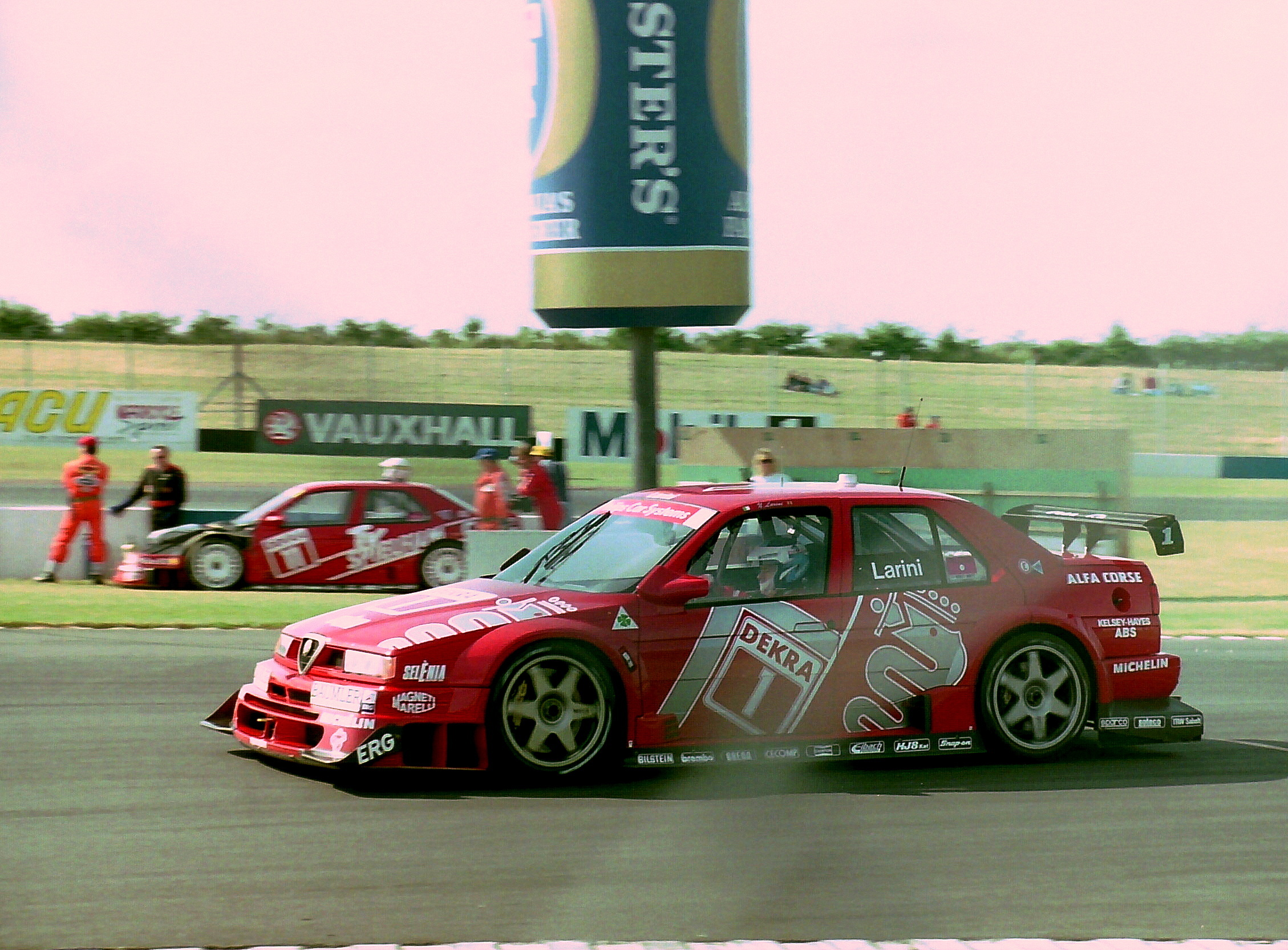
Nicola Larini - Alfa Corse - Alfa Romeo 155 V6 TI 94, 1994 DTM Donington Park

In 1994, Larini would have another chance with Ferrari in Formula One, replacing the injured Jean Alesi early in the season. He qualified seventh at the Pacific Grand Prix, but along with Ayrton Senna was eliminated at the first corner by Mika Häkkinen. Then at the San Marino Grand Prix, he took second place, but his first points score was overshadowed by the tragic deaths of Roland Ratzenberger and Ayrton Senna. It was back to touring cars with Alfa for the rest of the year, with Larini placing third in the German series.

Alfa would drop off the pace for the next two years, with Larini placing sixth in the German series in 1995, and 11th in the ITC in 1996. However, 1997 would see his Ferrari connections land him a seat with Sauber, who were using rebranded Ferrari engines. Larini scored a point on his return at the Australian Grand Prix, but left after five races after a series of disagreements with Peter Sauber.

== Later career ==
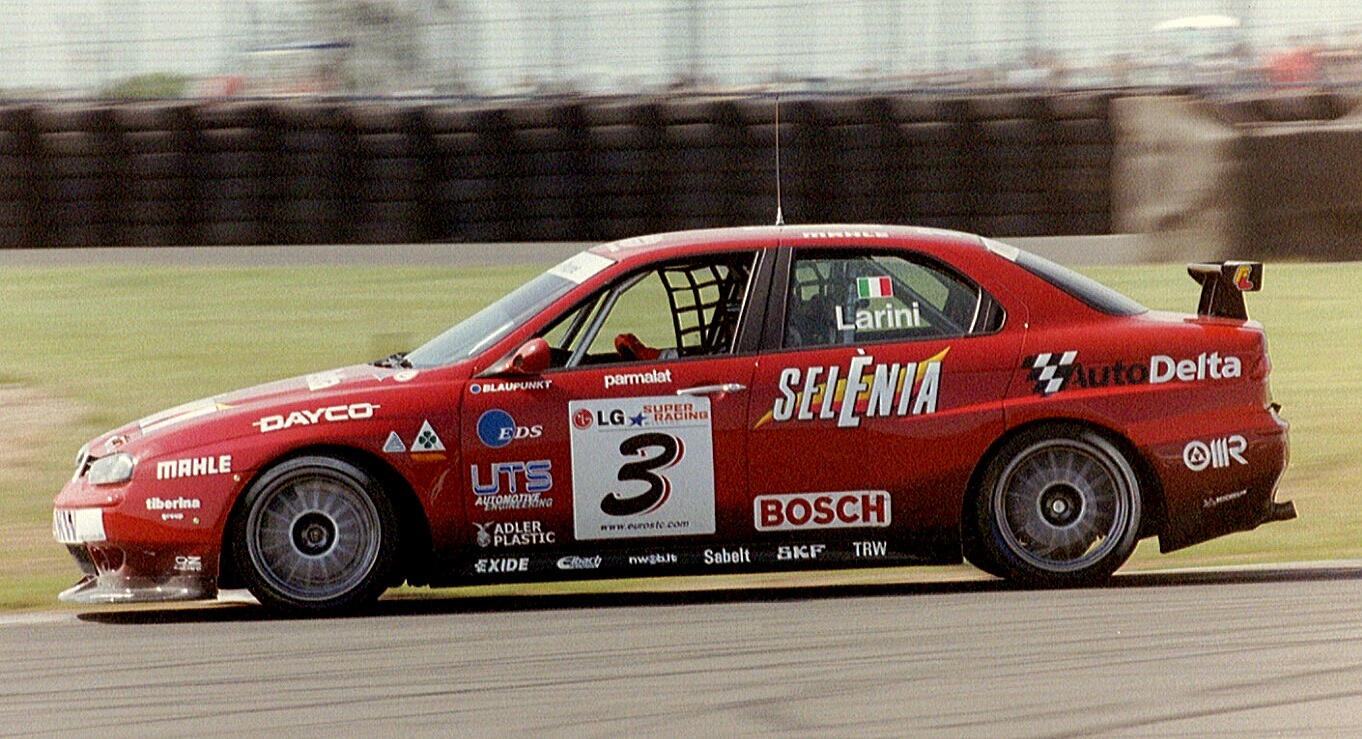
Larini -Alfa Romeo 156 GTA in Donington 2003 ETCC

After that, Larini was a stalwart in touring cars, for Alfa Romeo for many years in the European Touring Car Championship, and between 2005 and 2009 for Chevrolet in the WTCC (World Touring Car Championship). On November 21, 2009, he announced that he would quit his professional racing driver career, but would not stop racing completely. For example, in 2016, he won Race 1 in Imola at the European Lotus Cup, in 2017, made his NASCAR Whelen Euro Series debut at Autodromo di Franciacorta, driving the No. 1 Ford Mustang for Alex Caffi Motorsport.

== Championships ==
- 1986 – Italian Formula 3 Champion – Dallara Alfa Romeo Marlboro
- 1992 – Italiano Superturismo Champion – Alfa Romeo 155 GTA turbo
- 1992 – Monza Rally Show Winner
- 1993 – DTM Champion – Alfa Romeo 155 V6 2.5 TI DTM

== Racing record ==
=== Career summary ===
Season	Series	Team	Races	Wins	Poles	F/Laps	Podiums	Points	Position
1985	FIA European Formula 3 Cup	Team Gulf Coloni	1	0	0	0	0	N/A	4th
1986	FIA European Formula 3 Cup	Team Gulf Coloni	1	0	0	0	1	N/A	**3rd**
1986	International Formula 3000 Championship	Coloni Racing	1	0	0	0	0	0	NC
1987	International Formula 3000 Championship	Forti Corse	4	0	0	0	0	0	NC
1987	World Touring Car Championship	Alfa Corse	2	0	0	0	1	30	35th
1987	Formula One	Enzo Coloni Racing Car Systems	1	0	0	0	0	0	NC
1988	Formula One	Osella Squadra Corse	10	0	0	0	0	0	NC
1989	Formula One	Osella Squadra Corse	8	0	0	0	0	0	NC
1990	Formula One	Équipe Ligier Gitanes	16	0	0	0	0	0	NC
1991	Formula One	Modena Team SpA	5	0	0	0	0	0	NC
1992	Italian Superturismo Championship	Alfa Corse	20	10	7	10	15	284	**1st**
1992	Formula One	Scuderia Ferrari	2	0	0	0	0	0	NC
1993	Deutsche Tourenwagen Meisterschaft	Alfa Corse	22	11	3	12	15	261	**1st**
1993	FIA Touring Car Challenge	Alfa Corse	2	0	0	0	2	54	**2nd**
1994	Deutsche Tourenwagen Meisterschaft	Alfa Corse	18	2	1	5	8	150	**3rd**
1994	Formula One	Scuderia Ferrari	2	0	0	0	1	6	14th
1995	Deutsche Tourenwagen Meisterschaft	Alfa Corse	14	0	1	1	5	71	6th
1995	International Touring Car Championship	Alfa Corse	9	1	2	3	3	59	4th
1996	International Touring Car Championship	Martini Alfa Corse	26	2	1	2	4	95	11th
1997	Formula One	Red Bull Sauber Petronas	5	0	0	0	0	1	19th
1998	Italian Superturismo Championship	Nordauto Engineering	20	3	0	2	13	331	**3rd**
1998	Super Tourenwagen Cup	Alfa Corse	2	0	0	1	0	23	26th
1999	Italian Superturismo Championship	Nordauto Engineering	20	3	1	4	13	343	4th
1999	SportsRacing World Cup	Target 24	4	0	2	1	2	27	17th
1999	Super Tourenwagen Cup	Alfa Corse	2	0	0	0	1	20	26th
2000	European Touring Car Championship	Nordauto Engineering	20	0	0	3	9	195	4th
2001	European Touring Car Championship	Alfa Romeo Team Nordauto	20	3	1	4	11	604	**2nd**
2002	European Touring Car Championship	GTA Racing Team Nordauto	19	4	2	4	11	86	**3rd**
2003	European Touring Car Championship	GTA Racing Team Nordauto	20	1	4	2	7	92	4th
2004	Porsche Supercup	Porsche AG	1	0	0	0	0	0	NC
2005	World Touring Car Championship	Chevrolet RML	19	0	0	0	0	9	16th
2006	World Touring Car Championship	Chevrolet RML	18	0	0	0	2	24	12th
2006	TC 2000 Championship	Chevrolet Pro Racing	1	0	0	0	0	0	NC
2007	World Touring Car Championship	Chevrolet RML	22	0	0	0	6	71	5th
2008	World Touring Car Championship	Chevrolet RML	24	0	1	2	4	48	11th
2009	World Touring Car Championship	Chevrolet RML	24	1	0	0	1	27	13th
2010	Superstars Series	Rangoni Motorsport	1	0	0	0	0	0	NC
2011	24 Hours of Nürburgring - E1-XP2	Scuderia Cameron Glickenhaus	1	0	0	0	1	N/A	**2nd**
2011	Volkswagen Scirocco R-Cup	N/A	1	0	0	1	1	0	NC
2012	24 Hours of Nürburgring - E1-XP	Global Partner Enterprise SA	1	1	0	0	1	N/A	**1st**
2012	Volkswagen Scirocco R-Cup	N/A	1	0	0	0	1	0	NC
2013	Superstars Series	Petri Corse	2	0	0	0	0	3	31st
2013	Volkswagen Scirocco R-Cup	N/A	2	1	1	0	1	0	NC
2016	Lamborghini Super Trofeo Europe - Pro	Petri Corse	5	0	0	0	0	26	11th
2017	NASCAR Whelen Euro Series	Alex Caffi Motorsport	2	0	0	0	0	116	29th
2018	Italian GT Championship - GT3	Petri Corse Motorsport	2	0	0	0	0	6	30th
2018	24 Hours of Nürburgring - TCR	Hyundai Motorsport N	1	0	0	0	1	N/A	**2nd**
2026	Italian GT Championship Sprint Cup - GT Cup Div.2	A2 Motorsport							

=== Complete International Formula 3000 results ===
(key) (Races in bold indicate pole position; races in italics indicate fastest lap.)

Year	Entrant	Chassis	Engine	1	2	3	4	5	6	7	8	9	10	11	Pos.	Pts
1986	Coloni Racing	March 85B	Cosworth	SIL	VAL	PAU	SPA	IMO	MUG	PER; Ret	ÖST	BIR	BUG	JAR	NC	0
1987	Forti Corse	Dallara 3087	Cosworth	SIL	VAL	SPA	PAU	DON	PER; Ret	BRH; 16	BIR	IMO; Ret	BUG	JAR; Ret	NC	0

=== Complete Formula One results ===
(key) (Races in bold indicate pole position, races in italics indicate fastest lap)

Year	Entrant	Chassis	Engine	1	2	3	4	5	6	7	8	9	10	11	12	13	14	15	16	17	WDC	Pts
1987	Enzo Coloni Racing Car Systems	Coloni FC-187	Ford Cosworth DFZ 3.5 V8	BRA	SMR	BEL	MON	DET	FRA	GBR	GER	HUN	AUT	ITA; DNQ	POR	ESP; Ret	MEX	JPN	AUS		NC	0
1988	Osella Squadra Corse	Osella FA1I	Osella 890T 1.5 V8t	BRA; DNQ																	NC	0
1988	Osella Squadra Corse	Osella FA1L	Osella 890T 1.5 V8t		SMR; EX	MON; 9	MEX; DNQ	CAN; DNQ	DET; Ret	FRA; Ret	GBR; 19	GER; Ret	HUN; DNPQ	BEL; Ret	ITA; Ret	POR; 12	ESP; Ret	JPN; Ret	AUS; DNPQ		NC	0
1989	Osella Squadra Corse	Osella FA1M89	Ford Cosworth DFR 3.5 V8	BRA; DSQ	SMR; 12	MON; DNPQ	MEX; DNPQ	USA; DNPQ	CAN; Ret	FRA; DNPQ	GBR; Ret	GER; DNPQ	HUN; DNPQ	BEL; DNPQ	ITA; Ret	POR; DNPQ	ESP; Ret	JPN; Ret	AUS; Ret		NC	0
1990	Equipe Ligier Gitanes	Ligier JS33B	Ford Cosworth DFR 3.5 V8	USA; Ret	BRA; 11	SMR; 10	MON; Ret	CAN; Ret	MEX; 16	FRA; 14	GBR; 10	GER; 10	HUN; 11	BEL; 14	ITA; 11	POR; 10	ESP; 7	JPN; 7	AUS; 10		NC	0
1991	Modena Team SpA	Lambo 291	Lamborghini 3512 3.5 V12	USA; 7	BRA; DNPQ	SMR; DNPQ	MON; DNPQ	CAN; DNPQ	MEX; DNPQ	FRA; DNPQ	GBR; DNPQ	GER; Ret	HUN; 16	BEL; DNQ	ITA; 16	POR; DNQ	ESP; DNQ	JPN; DNQ	AUS; Ret		NC	0
1992	Scuderia Ferrari	Ferrari F92AT	Ferrari 038 3.5 V12	RSA	MEX	BRA	ESP	SMR	MON	CAN	FRA	GBR	GER	HUN	BEL	ITA	POR	JPN; 12	AUS; 11		NC	0
1994	Scuderia Ferrari	Ferrari 412T1	Ferrari 041 3.5 V12	BRA	PAC; Ret	SMR; 2	MON	ESP	CAN	FRA	GBR	GER	HUN	BEL	ITA	POR	EUR	JPN	AUS		14th	6
1997	Red Bull Sauber Petronas	Sauber C16	Petronas SPE-01 3.0 V10	AUS; 6	BRA; 11	ARG; Ret	SMR; 7	MON; Ret	ESP	CAN	FRA	GBR	GER	HUN	BEL	ITA	AUT	LUX	JPN	EUR	19th	1

=== Complete Deutsche Tourenwagen Meisterschaft results ===
(key) (Races in bold indicate pole position) (Races in italics indicate fastest lap)

Year	Team	Car	1	2	3	4	5	6	7	8	9	10	11	12	13	14	15	16	17	18	19	20	21	22	23	24	Pos.	Pts
1993	Alfa Corse	Alfa Romeo 155 V6 Ti	**ZOL**; **1**; 1	**ZOL**; **2**; 1	HOC; 1; 9	HOC; 2; 2	NÜR; 1; 1	**NÜR**; **2** Ret	**WUN**; **1**; 1	**WUN**; **2** Ret	NÜR; 1; 1	**NÜR**; **2**; 1	NOR; 1; 1	**NOR**; **2**; 1	DON; 1; 3	DON; 2; 1	DIE; 1; 10	DIE; 2; 1	**ALE**; **1**; 1	**ALE**; **2**; 2	AVU; 1; 6	AVU; 2; 3	HOC; 1; 4	HOC; 2; 19			1st	261
1994	Alfa Corse	Alfa Romeo 155 V6 Ti	**ZOL**; **1** Ret	ZOL; 2; 8	HOC; 1; 3	HOC; 2 DNS	NÜR; 1; 4	NÜR; 2; 1	MUG; 1; 4	MUG; 2 Ret	NÜR; 1 Ret	NÜR; 2 Ret	NOR; 1; 1	**NOR**; **2**; 2	DON; 1; 3	DON; 2 DNS	DIE; 1; 3	DIE; 2 Ret	NÜR; 1 Ret	NÜR; 2 DNS	AVU; 1; 3	AVU; 2; 6	ALE; 1; 1	**ALE**; **2**; 1	HOC; 1 Ret	HOC; 2 Ret	3rd	150
1995	Alfa Corse	Alfa Romeo 155 V6 Ti	**HOC**; **1**; 10	HOC; 2 Ret	AVU; 1 Ret	AVU; 2; 6	NOR; 1; 8	NOR; 2; 10†	DIE; 1; 3	DIE; 2; 2	NÜR; 1; 2	NÜR; 2; 3	ALE; 1; 3	ALE; 2 Ret	HOC; 1 Ret	HOC; 2 Ret											6th	71
Sources:

- † — Retired, but was classified as he completed 90% of the winner's race distance.

=== Complete International Touring Car Championship results ===
(key) (Races in bold indicate pole position) (Races in italics indicate fastest lap)

Year	Team	Car	1	2	3	4	5	6	7	8	9	10	11	12	13	14	15	16	17	18	19	20	21	22	23	24	25	26	Pos.	Pts
1995	Alfa Corse	Alfa Romeo 155 V6 Ti	MUG; 1; 2	MUG; 2; 5	HEL; 1; 7	HEL; 2; 1	DON; 1 Ret	DON; 2; 12	**EST**; **1**; 3	EST; 2 Ret	**MAG**; **1** Ret	MAG; 2 DNS																	4th	59
1996	Martini Alfa Corse	Alfa Romeo 155 V6 Ti	**HOC**; **1**; 11	HOC; 2; 12	NÜR; 1 Ret	NÜR; 2; 7	EST; 1 Ret	EST; 2 Ret	HEL; 1 Ret	HEL; 2; 6	NOR; 1 Ret	NOR; 2 Ret	DIE; 1 Ret	DIE; 2 DNS	SIL; 1; 3	SIL; 2 Ret	NÜR; 1; 6	NÜR; 2; 15	**MAG**; **1**; 2	MAG; 2 Ret	**MUG**; **1**; 1	**MUG**; **2** Ret	HOC; 1 Ret	HOC; 2 Ret	INT; 1 Ret	INT; 2; 1	SUZ; 1; 6	SUZ; 2; 6	11th	95

=== Complete Super Tourenwagen Cup results ===
(key) (Races in bold indicate pole position) (Races in italics indicate fastest lap)

Year	Team	Car	1	2	3	4	5	6	7	8	9	10	11	12	13	14	15	16	17	18	19	20	Pos.	Pts
1998	Alfa Corse	Alfa Romeo 156	HOC; 1	HOC; 2	NÜR; 1	NÜR; 2	SAC; 1	SAC; 2	NOR; 1; 12	NOR; 2; 14	REG; 1	REG; 2	WUN; 1	WUN; 2	ZWE; 1	ZWE; 2	SAL; 1	SAL; 2	OSC; 1	OSC; 2	NÜR; 1	NÜR; 2	26th	23
1999	Alfa Corse	Alfa Romeo 156	SAC; 1	SAC; 2	ZWE; 1	ZWE; 2	OSC; 1	OSC; 2	NOR; 1	NOR; 2	MIS; 1; 2	MIS; 2 Ret	NÜR; 1	NÜR; 2	SAL; 1	SAL; 2	OSC; 1	OSC; 2	HOC; 1	HOC; 2	NÜR; 1	NÜR; 2	26th	20

=== Complete Italian Superturismo Championship results ===
Year	Team	Car	Class	1	2	3	4	5	6	7	8	9	10	11	12	13	14	15	16	17	18	19	20	DC	Pts
1992	Alfa Corse	Alfa Romeo 155 GTA	S1	**MNZ**; **1** Ret	MNZ; 2; 1	MAG; 1; 2	MAG; 2; 3	**MUG**; **1** Ret	MUG; 2; 2	**BIN**; **1**; 1	**BIN**; **2**; 1	**VAL**; **1**; 1	**VAL**; **2**; 1	IMO; 1; 1	**IMO**; **2**; 1	**MIS**; **1**; 1	**MIS**; **2**; 1	**PER**; **1**; 4	PER; 2 Ret	VAR; 1; 2	VAR; 2; 2	MNZ; 1; 4	MNZ; 2; 3	1st	284
1998	Nordauto Engineering	Alfa Romeo 156		BIN; 1; 5	BIN; 2; 3	IMO; 1; 4	IMO; 2; 4	MNZ; 1; 1	**MNZ**; **2**; 2	VAR; 1; 3	VAR; 2; 3	VAL; 1; 4	VAL; 2 Ret	MAG; 1; 2	MAG; 2; 10	PER; 1; 3	PER; 2; 2	MIS; 1; 2	MIS; 2 DSQ	MNZ; 1; 2	MNZ; 2; 3	VAL; 1; 1	**VAL**; **2**; 1	3rd	331
1999	Nordauto Engineering	Alfa Romeo 156		**MIS**; **1**; 3	MIS; 2; 3	BIN; 1; 5	BIN; 2; 5	IMO; 1; 4	IMO; 2 Ret	PER; 1; 3	PER; 2; 2	MAG; 1; 8	MAG; 2; 3	MUG; 1 Ret	MUG; 2; 2	MIS; 1; 1	**MIS**; **2**; 3	VAR; 1; 1	**VAR**; **2**; 3	MNZ; 1; 2	MNZ; 2; 2	VAL; 1; 1	**VAL**; **2**; 4	4th	343

=== Complete European Touring Car Championship results ===
(key) (Races in bold indicate pole position) (Races in italics indicate fastest lap)

Year	Team	Car	1	2	3	4	5	6	7	8	9	10	11	12	13	14	15	16	17	18	19	20	DC	Pts
2000	Nordauto Engineering	Alfa Romeo 156	MUG; 1; 2	MUG; 2; 2	PER; 1; 3	PER; 2; 6	A1R; 1; 4	A1R; 2; 3	MNZ; 1; 14	MNZ; 2 Ret	HUN; 1; 5	HUN; 2; 5	IMO; 1; 5	IMO; 2; 4	MIS; 1; 5	MIS; 2; 5	BRN; 1; 3	BRN; 2; 6	VAL; 1; 2	VAL; 2; 2	MOB; 1; 2	MOB; 2; 3	4th	195
2001	Alfa Romeo Team Nordauto	Alfa Romeo 156	MNZ; 1; 1	MNZ; 2; 2	BRN; 1; 1	BRN; 2; 2	**MAG**; **1**; 2	MAG; 2; 2	SIL; 1; 5	SIL; 2; 3	ZOL; 1 Ret	ZOL; 2; 3	HUN; 1; 12	**HUN**; **2**; 2	A1R; 1; 14	**A1R**; **2**; 2	NÜR; 1; 1	NÜR; 2; 5	JAR; 1; 4	JAR; 2; 5	EST; 1; 4	EST; 2; 5	2nd	604
2002	GTA Racing Team Nordauto	Alfa Romeo 156 GTA	MAG; 1; 2	MAG; 2; 2	SIL; 1; 1	SIL; 2; 2	BRN; 1; 3	BRN; 2; 3	JAR; 1; 2	JAR; 2; 1	**AND**; **1**; 1	AND; 2; 5	OSC; 1; 6	**OSC**; **2**; 6	**SPA**; **1**; 1	SPA; 2; 9	PER; 1; 2	PER; 2; 4	DON; 1 Ret	DON; 2 DNS	EST; 1 Ret	EST; 2; 6	3rd	86
2003	GTA Racing Team Nordauto	Alfa Romeo 156 GTA	VAL; 1; 7	VAL; 2; 6	**MAG**; **1**; 2	MAG; 2; 2	PER; 1; 7	PER; 2; 5	BRN; 1; 13	BRN; 2; 5	**DON**; **1**; 2	DON; 2; 4	SPA; 1; 4	SPA; 2; 2	**AND**; **1**; 6	AND; 2; 1	OSC; 1; 17†	OSC; 2; 8	**EST**; **1**; 2	EST; 2; 2	MNZ; 1; 10†	MNZ; 2; 4	4th	92

=== Complete World Touring Car Championship results ===
(key) (Races in bold indicate pole position) (Races in italics indicate fastest lap)

Year	Team	Car	1	2	3	4	5	6	7	8	9	10	11	12	13	14	15	16	17	18	19	20	21	22	23	24	DC	Pts
1987	Alfa Corse	Alfa Romeo 75 Turbo	MNZ	JAR	DIJ	NÜR	SPA	BRN; Ret	SIL; 3	BAT	CLD	WEL	FUJ														35th	30
2005	Chevrolet	Chevrolet Lacetti	ITA; 1; 24	ITA; 2; 15	FRA; 1; 17	FRA; 2; 13	GBR; 1 Ret	GBR; 2 DNS	SMR; 1; 13	SMR; 2; 11	MEX; 1; 10	MEX; 2; 7	BEL; 1; 17	BEL; 2; 18	GER; 1; 17	GER; 2; 11	TUR; 1 NC	TUR; 2 Ret	ESP; 1; 7	ESP; 2 Ret	MAC; 1; 4	MAC; 2; 10					16th	9
2006	Chevrolet	Chevrolet Lacetti	ITA; 1; 27	ITA; 2; 7	FRA; 1; 11	FRA; 2; 8	GBR; 1 NC	GBR; 2; 12	GER; 1; 14	GER; 2; 21	BRA; 1 Ret	BRA; 2 DNS	MEX; 1; 15	MEX; 2 Ret	CZE; 1; 11	CZE; 2; 7	TUR; 1; 7	TUR; 2; 3	ESP; 1; 3	ESP; 2; 4	MAC; 1; 22	MAC; 2 DNS					12th	24
2007	Chevrolet	Chevrolet Lacetti	BRA; 1 Ret	BRA; 2; 10	NED; 1; 2	NED; 2; 4	ESP; 1; 2	ESP; 2; 5	FRA; 1 Ret	FRA; 2; 11	CZE; 1; 5	CZE; 2; 6	POR; 1; 3	POR; 2; 20	SWE; 1; 7	SWE; 2; 2	GER; 1 Ret	GER; 2; 21	GBR; 1 Ret	GBR; 2; 12	ITA; 1; 4	ITA; 2; 2	MAC; 1; 7	MAC; 2; 2			5th	71
2008	Chevrolet	Chevrolet Lacetti	BRA; 1 Ret	BRA; 2; 12	MEX; 1; 3	MEX; 2 Ret	ESP; 1; 6	ESP; 2; 9	FRA; 1; 7	FRA; 2; 2	CZE; 1; 11	CZE; 2; 11	**POR**; **1**; 2	POR; 2; 6	GBR; 1; 23	GBR; 2; 12	GER; 1 Ret	GER; 2; 11	EUR; 1; 6	EUR; 2; 4	ITA; 1; 5	ITA; 2; 3	JPN; 1; 16	JPN; 2; 12	MAC; 1; 9	MAC; 2 Ret	11th	48
2009	Chevrolet	Chevrolet Cruze LT	BRA; 1; 15	BRA; 2; 15	MEX; 1; 8	**MEX**; **2**; 10	MAR; 1; 6	MAR; 2; 1	FRA; 1 NC	FRA; 2; 9	ESP; 1; 11	ESP; 2; 13	CZE; 1 Ret	CZE; 2; 13	POR; 1; 5	POR; 2 Ret	GBR; 1; 22	GBR; 2; 17	GER; 1; 15	GER; 1; 6	ITA; 1 Ret	ITA; 2; 16	JPN; 1; 12	JPN; 2; 5	MAC; 1; 12	MAC; 2; 7	13th	27

=== Complete International Superstars Series results ===
(key) (Races in bold indicate pole position) (Races in italics indicate fastest lap)

Year	Team	Car	1	2	3	4	5	6	7	8	9	10	11	12	13	14	15	16	Pos.	Pts
2010	Rangoni Motorsport	Mercedes C63 AMG	MNZ; 1	MNZ; 2	IMO; 1	IMO; 2	ALG; 1	ALG; 2	HOC; 1	HOC; 2	CPR; 1	CPR; 2	VAL; 1 Ret	VAL; 2 DNS	KYA; 1	KYA; 2			50th	0
2013	Petri Corse	Porsche Panamera S	MNZ; 1	MNZ; 2	BRN; 1	BRN; 2	SVK; 1	SVK; 2	ZOL; R1; 10	ZOL; R2; Ret	ALG; R1; DNS	ALG; R2; DNS	DON; 1	DON; 2	IMO; 1	IMO; 2	VAL; 1	VAL; 2	32nd	3

== Notes ==
Sporting positions
Preceded by Franco Forini	Italian Formula Three Championship; Champion; 1986	Succeeded by Enrico Bertaggia
Preceded by Roberto Ravaglia	Italia Superturismo Championship; Champion; 1992	Succeeded by Roberto Ravaglia
Preceded by Klaus Ludwig	Deutsche Tourenwagen Meisterschaft; Champion; 1993	Succeeded by Klaus Ludwig
