= Barry Horne (racing driver) =

British racing driver (born 1977)

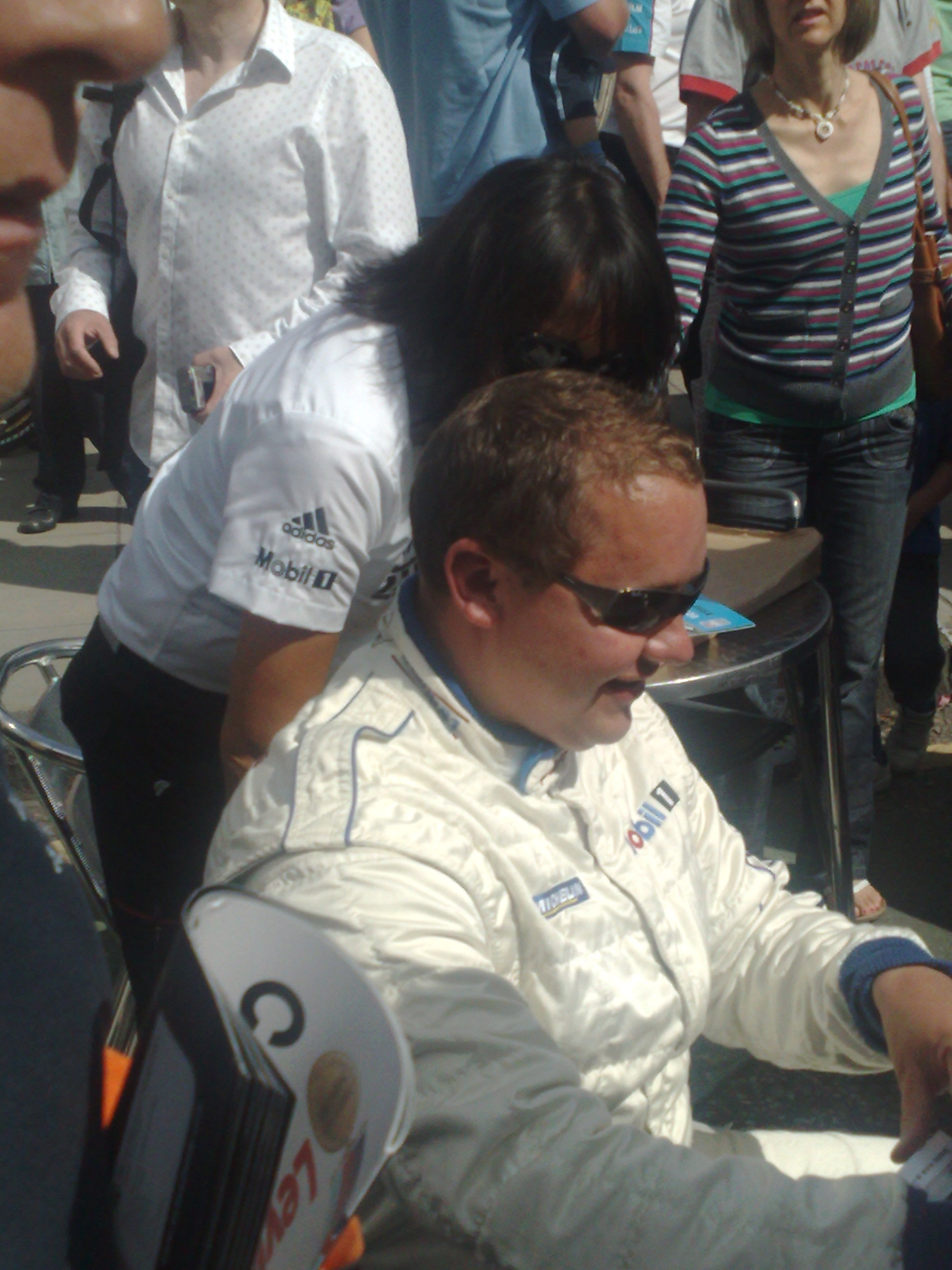
- Horne at the British Touring Car Championship Festival in Edinburgh in 2009.
- Nationality: (United Kingdom) British
- Born: 21 November 1977 (age 48) Dunfermline, Scotland

British Touring Car Championship career
- Debut season: 2015
- Current team: Dextra Racing
- Car number: 114
- Starts: 3
- Wins: 0
- Poles: 0
- Fastest laps: 0
- Best finish: 25th in 2015

Previous series
- 2003-04 2003 1998-99: Porsche Supercup; Porsche Carrera Cup GB; British Formula Ford Championship

Championship titles
- 2003: Porsche Carrera Cup GB

Barry Horne (born 21 November 1977) is a British racing driver currently competing in the British Touring Car Championship. He made his debut in 2015.

== Racing career ==
Horne began his career in the 1998 British Formula Ford Championship, he raced in the championship from 1998–1999 ending eighth in the standings in 1998. He switched to the Porsche Carrera Cup GB for the 2003 season, he won the championship that year, with 333 points. From 2003–2004, Horne also raced in the Porsche Supercup. In August 2015, it was announced that Horne would make his British Touring Car Championship debut with Dextra Racing driving a Ford Focus ST, replacing Alex Martin at Snetterton.

== Racing record ==
=== Complete British Touring Car Championship results ===
(key) (Races in bold indicate pole position – 1 point awarded just in first race; races in italics indicate fastest lap – 1 point awarded all races; * signifies that driver led race for at least one lap – 1 point given all races)

Year	Team	Car	1	2	3	4	5	6	7	8	9	10	11	12	13	14	15	16	17	18	19	20	21	22	23	24	25	26	27	28	29	30	DC	Pts
2015	Dextra Racing	Ford Focus ST	BRH; 1	BRH; 2	BRH; 3	DON; 1	DON; 2	DON; 3	THR; 1	THR; 2	THR; 3	OUL; 1	OUL; 2	OUL; 3	CRO; 1	CRO; 2	CRO; 3	SNE; 1; 20	SNE; 2; 13	SNE; 3 Ret	KNO; 1	KNO; 2	KNO; 3	ROC; 1	ROC; 2	ROC; 3	SIL; 1	SIL; 2	SIL; 3	BRH; 1	BRH; 2	BRH; 3	25th	3
