= Reynard 853 =

- Category: Formula 3
- Constructor: Reynard
- Designer: Adrian Reynard

Technical specifications
- Chassis: Carbon fiber honeycomb monocoque with rear sub-frame
- Length: 4,150 mm (163 in)
- Width: 1,800 mm (71 in)
- Height: 960 mm (38 in)
- Axle track: 1,750 mm (69 in) (front); 1,700 mm (67 in) (rear)
- Wheelbase: 2,505 mm (98.6 in)
- Engine: Mid-engine, longitudinally mounted, Alfa Romeo/Volkswagen/Saab, 2.0 L (122.0 cu in), SOHC/DOHC I4, NA,
- Transmission: Hewland 5-speed manual
- Power: 160–172 hp (119–128 kW); 223–244 N⋅m (164–180 lb⋅ft)
- Weight: 486 kg (1,071 lb)
- Brakes: Disc brakes
- Tyres: Michelin

Competition history
- Debut: 1985

The Reynard 853 is an open-wheel Formula 3 race car, designed, developed, and built by Reynard in 1985.
