= Reynard 863 =

- Category: Formula 3
- Constructor: Reynard
- Designer(s): Adrian Reynard

Technical specifications
- Chassis: Carbon fiber honeycomb monocoque with rear sub-frame
- Length: 4,150 mm (163 in)
- Width: 1,800 mm (71 in)
- Height: 960 mm (38 in)
- Wheelbase: 2,045 mm (80.5 in)
- Engine: Mid-engine, longitudinally mounted, Alfa Romeo/Volkswagen, 2.0 L (122.0 cu in), SOHC/DOHC I4, NA
- Transmission: Hewland 5-speed manual
- Power: 172–174 hp (128–130 kW)
- Weight: 470 kg (1,040 lb)
- Brakes: Disc brakes

Competition history
- Debut: 1986

The Reynard 863 is an open-wheel Formula 3 race car, designed, developed and built by Reynard in 1986.
