= 1988 International Gold Cup =

The 13th round of the 1988 B.A.R.C./B.R.D.C. Lucas Formula Three British Championship, saw the series visit Oulton Park for the 23rd International Gold Cup, on 21 August.

== Report ==
=== Entry ===
A total of 33 F3 cars were entered for this round of the British F3 Championship. Come race weekend only 27 arrived in Cheshire for qualifying.

=== Qualifying ===
JJ Lehto took pole position for Pacific Racing Team in their Toyota-engined Reynard 883, averaging a speed of 109.608 mph.

=== Race ===
The race was held over 20 laps of the Oulton Park circuit. Gary Brabham took the winner spoils for the Bowman Racing team, driving their Ralt-Volkswagen RT32. The Aussie won in a time of 30:29.17mins., averaging a speed of 108.967 mph. Brabham's victory will 21 years after his father, Sir Jack Brabham, last won the Gold Cup. Second place went to JJ Lehto in Pacific Racing Team's Reynard-Toyota 883, who was only 1.4 of a second behind. Another son of a famous racer, Damon Hill completed the podium for the Cellnet Ricoh Racing/Intersport Racing Team in his Toyota engined Ralt RT32. Completing the Brabham family domination of the race, Gary's younger brother, David won the National Class, also in a Jack Brabham Racing prepared Ralt-Volkswagen.

== Classification ==
=== Race ===
Class winners in bold

Pos.	No.	Class	Driver	Entrant	Car - Engine	Time, Laps	Reason Out
1st	**5**	**A**	(Australia) **Gary Brabham**	**Bowman Racing**	**Ralt-Volkswagen RT32**	**30:29.17**	
2nd	9	A	(Finland) JJ Lehto	Pacific Racing Team	Reynard-Toyota 883	30:30.57	
3rd	29	A	(United Kingdom) Damon Hill	Cellnet Ricoh Racing / Intersport Racing	Ralt-Toyota RT32	30:44.36	
4th	2	A	(United Kingdom) Eddie Irvine	West Surrey Racing	Ralt-Alfa Romeo RT32	30:48.54	
5th	24	A	(Switzerland) Philippe Favre	Alan Docking Racing	Reynard-Alfa Romeo 883	30:52.68	
6th	27	A	(United Kingdom) Jason Elliott	Eddie Jordan Racing	Reynard-Volkswagen 883	30:55.10	
7th	11	A	(Portugal) Antonio Simoes	West Surrey Racing	Ralt-Alfa Romeo RT32	31:09.10	
8th	30	A	(United Kingdom) Phil Andrews	Middlebridge Racing	Reynard-Toyota 883	31:11.81	
9th	4	A	(Netherlands) Peter Kox	Cellnet Ricoh Racing / Intersport Racing	Ralt-Toyota RT31	31:12.37	
10th	28	A	(United Kingdom) Perry McCarthy	Madgwick Motorsport	Reynard-Alfa Romeo 883	31:12.79	
11th	**59**	**Nat.**	(Australia) **David Brabham**	**Jack Brabham Racing**	**Ralt-Volkswagen RT31**	**31:23.72**	
12th	61	Nat.	(Republic of Ireland) Rowan Dewhurst	Eddie Jordan Racing	Reynard-Volkswagen 873	31:24.82	
13th	14	A	(France) Raphaël Real del Sarte	TechSpeed Racing	Reynard-Toyota 883	31:25.37	
14th	51	Nat.	(United Kingdom) Alistair Lyall	Swallow Racing	Reynard-Volkswagen 873	31:34.84	
15th	15	A	(United States) John Hotchkiss	TechSpeed Racing	Reynard-Toyota 883	31:44.38	
16th	77	Nat.	(United Kingdom) Scott Stringfellow	Jim Lee Racing	Reynard-Volkswagen 873	31:44.72	
17th	68	Nat.	(United Kingdom) Don Hardman	Industrial Process	Reynard-Volkswagen 853/863	19	
18th	86	Nat.	(United Kingdom) Geoffrey Janes	Autospeed Tyres	Reynard-Volkswagen 863	19	
DNF	58	Nat.	(United Kingdom) John Penfold	Jack Brabham Racing	Ralt-Volkswagen RT31	18	Suspension
DNF	54	Nat.	(United Kingdom) Gary Ward	RGS Racing	Ralt-Volkswagen RT31	13	Suspension
DNF	26	A	(Switzerland) Alain Menu	Harvey Office Furniture	Ralt-Volkswagen RT32	7	Crash
DNF	1	A	(United Kingdom) Paul Warwick	Eddie Jordan Racing	Reynard-Volkswagen 883	7	Crash
DNF	16	A	(United Kingdom) Ross Hockenhull	Bowman Racing	Ralt-Volkswagen RT32	3	Crash
DNF	71	Nat.	(Sweden) Robert Amrén	Alan Docking Racing	Reynard-Volkswagen 873	3	Crash
DNF	85	Nat.	(United Kingdom) Robert Murphy	Jim Lee Racing	Reynard-Volkswagen 873	0	Spin
DNS	18	A	(United Kingdom) John Alcorn	Middlebridge Racing	Reynard-Toyota 883		
DNS	52	Nat.	(Australia) Tomas Mezera	Peter Lea Racing	Reynard-Volkswagen 873		

- Fastest lap: JJ Lehto, 1:30.68ecs. (109.874 mph)
