= 1988 Cellnet Superprix =

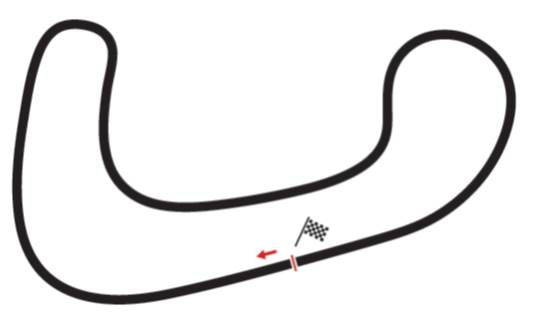
Layout of the Brands Hatch Indy Circuit (1976–1998)

After the 18th and final round of the 1988 B.A.R.C./B.R.D.C. Lucas Formula Three British Championship, the mobile telephone company Cellnet, who were already sponsoring the Intersport Racing team, organised an invitation non championship, end of season race. This race was held at Brands Hatch, on 9 October. Although Avon Tyres still supplied the tyres, Cellnet decided to increase interest by introducing a compulsory wheel change mid-race. They requested that the changes should be visible to spectators, so Avon came up with the idea of painting the whole side of the tyres.

== Report ==
=== Entry ===
A total of 39 F3 cars were entered for this event. Come race weekend eights cars failed to arrive in Kent for qualifying.

=== Qualifying ===
John Alcorn took pole position for Pacific Racing Team in their Toyota-engined Reynard 883, averaging a speed of 95.862 mph.

=== Race ===
The race was held over 45 wet laps of the Brands Hatch Indy circuit. With a full grid of 28 cars, the start was quite a fraught affair as various drivers, with nothing to lose, took risks not usually attempted during a championship race. This ended in tears for some. Damon Hill didn't even finish the first lap and Kenny Bräck and Jonathan Bancroft went out in the next lap. During the race, the wheel changing was full of drama as the teams finally put into practice what they had been learning, some successfully, others not! Paul Warwick in his Eddie Jordan Racing Reynard was also victim retiring after an overheated engine. Gary Brabham took the winner spoils for the Bowman Racing team, driving their Ralt-Volkswagen RT32. The Aussie won in a time of 37:10.92mins., averaging a speed of 87.436 mph. Second place went to Jason Elliott and Sweden's Rickard Rydell finishing third. The ‘fastest wheel change’ prize of £1,000 in loose £1 coins in a sack, was won by Middlebridge Racing which was a bit of a bonus a their driver, Phil Andrews, had driven a good race to finish 5th.

== Classification ==
=== Race ===
Class winners in bold

Pos.	No.	Class	Driver	Entrant	Car - Engine	Time, Laps	Reason Out
1st	**5**	**A**	(Australia) **Gary Brabham**	**Bowman Racing**	**Ralt-Volkswagen RT32**	**37:10.92**	
2nd	27	A	(United Kingdom) Jason Elliott	Eddie Jordan Racing	Reynard-Volkswagen 883	37:33.31	
3rd	8	A	(Sweden) Rickard Rydell	Picko Troberg Racing	Reynard-Volkswagen 883	37:33.72	
4th	4	A	(Netherlands) Peter Kox	Cellent Ricoh Racing / Intersport Racing	Ralt-Toyota RT32	37:38.73	
5th	30	A	(United Kingdom) Phil Andrews	Middlebridge Racing	Reynard-Toyota 883	44	
6th	15	A	(Austria) Roland Ratzenberger	TechSpeed Racing	Reynard-Toyota 883	44	
7th	**59**	**Nat.**	(Australia) **David Brabham**	**Jack Brabham Racing**	**Ralt-Volkswagen RT31**	**44**	
8th	24	A	(Switzerland) Philippe Favre	Alan Docking Racing	Reynard-Alfa Romeo 883	43	
9th	43	A	(United States) Dennis Vitolo	Concept 3 Racing	Reynard-Alfa Romeo 883	43	
10th	88	Nat.	(United Kingdom) Pete Boutwood	Terropol Promotions	Ralt-Volkswagen RT30	42	
11th	14	A	(France) Raphaël Real del Sarte	TechSpeed Racing	Reynard-Toyota 873	42	
12th	77	Nat.	(United Kingdom) Scott Stringfellow	Jim Lee Racing	Reynard-Volkswagen 873	41	
13th	90	A	(Netherlands) Harry van den Berg	Cellnet Ricoh Racing / Intersport Racing	Ralt-Toyota RT32	41	
14th	85	Nat.	(United Kingdom) Robert Murphy	Jim Lee Racing	Reynard-Volkswagen 873	40	
DNF	16	A	(United Kingdom) Ross Hockenhull	Bowman Racing	Ralt-Volkswagen RT32	44	Crash
DNF	71	Nat.	(Sweden) Robert Amrén	Alan Docking Racing	Reynard-Volkswagen 873	40	Crash
DNF	33	A	(United Kingdom) Jeremy Payne	Anglia Cars Racing	Ralt-Toyota RT32	37	Spin
DNF	2	A	(United Kingdom) Eddie Irvine	West Surrey Racing	Ralt-Alfa Romeo RT32	35	Misfire
DNF	10	A	(United Kingdom) John Alcorn	Pacific Racing Team	Reynard-Toyota 883	34	Engine
DNF	1	A	(United Kingdom) Paul Warwick	Eddie Jordan Racing	Reynard-Volkswagen 883	33	Overheating
DNF	6	A	(Italy) Giovanna Amati	Cellent Ricoh Racing / Intersport Racing	Ralt-Toyota RT32	30	Engine
DNF	58	Nat.	(United Kingdom) John Penfold	Jack Brabham Racing	Ralt-Volkswagen RT31	29	Crash
DNF	36	Nat.	(United Kingdom) Giles Butterfield	GB Motorsport	Reynard-Volkswagen 863	26	Crash
DNF	26	A	(Brazil) Oswaldo Negri	Racefax Motorsport	Ralt-Volkswagen RT32	18	Stuck throttle
DNF	89	Nat.	(United Kingdom) Tom Brown	JB Race Hire	Reynard-Volkswagen 873	17	Spin
DNF	3	A	(United Kingdom) Jonathan Bancroft	Madgwick Motorsport	Reynard-Alfa Romeo 883	2	Crash
DNF	35	A	(Sweden) Kenny Bräck	Formula Services	Reynard-Toyota 883	2	Crash
DNF	29	A	(United Kingdom) Damon Hill	Cellnet Ricoh Racing / Intersport Racing	Ralt-Toyota RT32	0	Crash
DNQ	78	Nat.	(United Kingdom) Charles Rickett	Jim Lee Racing	Reynard-Volkswagen 863		
DNQ	63	Nat.	(United Kingdom) Ronnie Grant	Ronnie Grant	Ralt-Volkswagen RT30		
DNQ	45	A	(Italy) Guido Basile	Terropol Promotions	Ralt-Volkswagen RT32		

- Fastest lap: Eddie Irvine, 44.34secs. (95.545 mph)
