= 1988 Macau Grand Prix =

Motor sport competition

Race details
Date	27 November 1988
Location	Guia Circuit, Macau
Course	Temporary street circuit 6.120 km (3.803 mi)
Distance	Leg 1; 12 laps, 73.44 km (45.63 mi); Leg 2; 15 laps, 91.8 km (57.0 mi)
- Leg 1

Pole
Driver	(United Kingdom) Eddie Irvine
Time	2:22.60

Fastest Lap
Driver	(United Kingdom) Eddie Irvine
Time	2:22.31

Podium
First	(United Kingdom) Eddie Irvine
Second	(France) Jean Alesi
Third	(Sweden) Rickard Rydell
- Leg 2

Pole
Driver	(United Kingdom) Eddie Irvine

Fastest Lap
Driver	(Germany) Otto Rensing
Time	2:22.49

Podium
First	(Germany) Otto Rensing
Second	(Italy) Enrico Bertaggia
Third	(United Kingdom) Damon Hill
- Overall Results
First	(Italy) Enrico Bertaggia
Second	(United Kingdom) Damon Hill
Third	(Germany) Otto Rensing

The 1988 Macau Grand Prix Formula Three was the 35th Macau Grand Prix race to be held on the streets of Macau on 27 November 1988. It was the fifth edition for Formula Three cars and was given the grand title of FIA Formula 3 Intercontinental Cup.

== Entry list ==
Team	No	Driver	Vehicle	Engine
(Hong Kong) Marlboro Theodore Racing w/ Eddie Jordan Racing	1	(France) Bertrand Gachot	Reynard 883	Volkswagen
(British Hong Kong) Marlboro Theodore Racing w/ Pacific Racing	2	(Finland) JJ Lehto	Reynard 883	Toyota
(British Hong Kong) Marlboro Theodore Racing w/ West Surrey Racing	3	(United Kingdom) Eddie Irvine	Ralt RT32	Alfa Romeo
(United Kingdom) West Surrey Racing	29	(Portugal) Antonio Simoes	Ralt RT32	Alfa Romeo
(United Kingdom) Flying Tigers Intersport Racing	5	(Netherlands) Jan Lammers	Ralt RT32	Toyota
(United Kingdom) Flying Tigers Intersport Racing	6	(United Kingdom) Damon Hill	Ralt RT32	Toyota
(United Kingdom) Intersport Racing	12	(France) Didier Artzet	Ralt RT32	Toyota
(United Kingdom) Kawai Steel w/ Bowman Racing	7	(Australia) Gary Brabham	Ralt RT32	Volkswagen
(United Kingdom) Bowman Racing	8	(United Kingdom) Ross Hockenhull	Ralt RT32	Volkswagen
(Republic of Ireland) Camel Eddie Jordan Racing	9	(United Kingdom) Martin Donnelly	Reynard 883	Volkswagen
(Republic of Ireland) Camel Eddie Jordan Racing	10	(Sweden) Stefan Johansson	Reynard 883	Volkswagen
(Germany) Camel WTS Equipe	11	(Germany) Joachim Winkelhock	Reynard 883	Volkswagen
(France) Team KTR	15	(France) Érik Comas	Ralt RT32	Volkswagen
(Italy) Forti Corse	16	(Italy) Enrico Bertaggia	Dallara 388	Alfa Romeo
(Italy) Forti Corse	17	(Italy) Gianni Morbidelli	Dallara 388	Alfa Romeo
(Germany) Camel Volkswagen Motorsport	18	(Germany) Otto Rensing	Reynard 883	Volkswagen
(Germany) Camel Volkswagen Motorsport	19	(Germany) Frank Krämer	BSR KS388	Volkswagen
(Italy) Prema Racing	20	(Italy) Fabrizio Giovanardi	Reynard 883	Alfa Romeo
(Italy) Prema Racing	21	(Italy) Gabriele Tarquini	Reynard 883	Alfa Romeo
(France) Alesi Junior Team	22	(France) Jean Alesi	Dallara 388	Alfa Romeo
(France) Equipe Serge Saulnier	23	(France) Christian Vidal	Ralt RT32	Alfa Romeo
(France) DG Racing	25	(France) Philippe Gache	Dallara 388	Volkswagen
(France) DG Racing	26	(France) Jacques Goudchaux	Dallara 388	Volkswagen
(Sweden) Tommy Jagerwall	27	(Sweden) Michael Johansson	Ralt RT31	Alfa Romeo
(Sweden) Picko Troberg Racing	28	(Sweden) Rickard Rydell	Reynard 883	Alfa Romeo
(Germany) Mönninghoff Racing	30	(Germany) Frank Biela	Reynard 883	Volkswagen
(Sweden) The Swedish Lions	31	(Sweden) Hakan Olausson	Reynard 883	Volkswagen
(United Kingdom) JTR	32	(Japan) Kiyoshi Misaki	Ralt RT32	Toyota
(Japan) JAX Racing	33	(Japan) Hideki Noda	Reynard 873	Toyota
(Austria) Marko RSM	35	(Austria) Karl Wendlinger	Ralt RT32	Alfa Romeo

=== Race ===
Pos.	No.	Driver	Team	Laps	Race Time
1	16	(Italy) Enrico Bertaggia	Forti Corse	27	1:05:00.890
2	6	(United Kingdom) Damon Hill	Intersport Racing	27	1:05:09.100
3	18	(Germany) Otto Rensing	Volkswagen Motorsport	27	1:05:09.920
4	30	(Belgium) Frank Biela	Mönninghoff Racing	27	1:05:24.870
5	7	(Australia) Gary Brabham	Bowman Racing	27	1:05:29.540
6	5	(Netherlands) Jan Lammers	Intersport Racing	27	1:05:36.890
7	17	(Italy) Gianni Morbidelli	Forti Corse	27	1:05:44.890
8	10	(Sweden) Stefan Johansson	Eddie Jordan Racing	27	1:05:47.740
9	21	(Italy) Gabriele Tarquini	Prema Racing	27	1:05:49.610
10	15	(France) Érik Comas	KTR Racing	27	1:05:57.410
11	22	(France) Jean Alesi	Alesi Junior Team	27	1:06:03.330
12	8	(United Kingdom) Ross Hockenhull	Bowman Racing	27	1:06:07.780
13	26	(France) Jacques Goudchaux	DG Racing	27	1:06:35.380
14	27	(Sweden) Michael Johansson	Tommy Jagerwall	27	1:07:12.460
15	31	(Sweden) Håkan Olausson	Swedish Lions	27	1:08:22.320
DNF	20	(Italy) Fabrizio Giovanardi	Prema Racing	23	56:55.410
DNF	29	(Portugal) Antonio Simoes	West Surrey Racing	22	53:52.080
DNF	1	(France) Bertrand Gachot	Theodore Racing	20	49:01.320
DNF	12	(France) Didier Artzet	Intersport Racing	19	47:23.910
DNF	28	(Sweden) Rickard Rydell	Picko Troberg Racing	19	45:49.970
DNF	35	(Austria) Karl Wendlinger	RSM Marko	15	36:50.990
DNF	23	(France) Christian Vidal	DG Racing	13	33:21.160
DNF	32	(Japan) Kiyoshi Misaki	JTR	12	30:10.640
DNF	2	(Finland) JJ Lehto	Pacific Racing	12	28:56.070
DNF	3	(United Kingdom) Eddie Irvine	West Surrey Racing	12	28:45.930
DNF	33	(Japan) Hideki Noda	JAX Racing	7	28:45.950
DNF	25	(France) Philippe Gache	DG Racing	6	15:56.270
DNF	9	(United Kingdom) Martin Donnelly	Eddie Jordan Racing	1	2:42.230
DNF	11	(Germany) Joachim Winkelhock	WTS Motorsport	-	-
DNF	19	(Germany) Frank Krämer	Volkswagen Motorsport	-	-
