= 1987 British Formula Three Championship =

Motor racing competition

1987 British Formula 3 International Series

Seasons
- ← 1986 1988 →

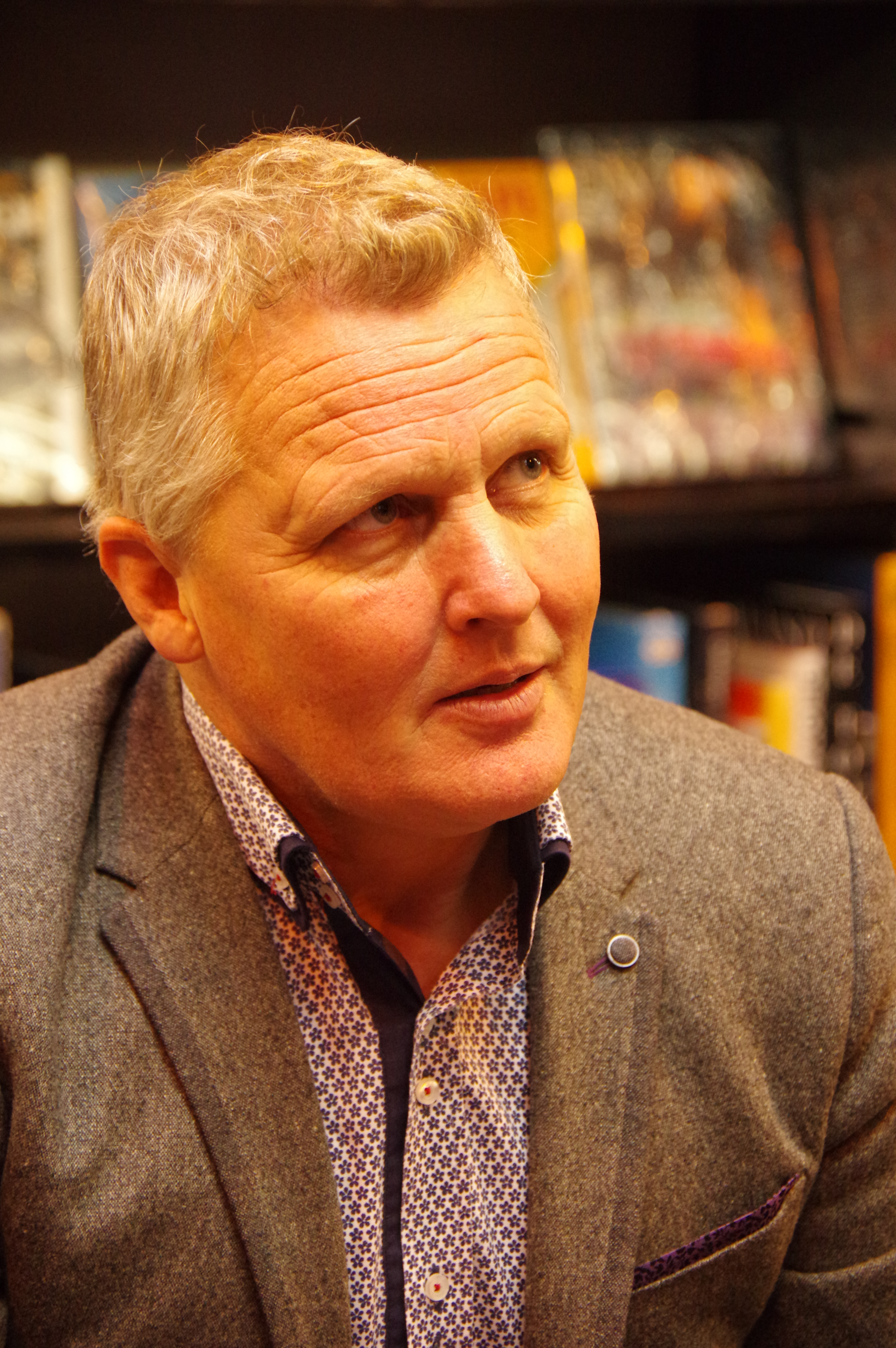
1987 champion, Johnny Herbert

The 1987 British Formula Three season was the 37th season of the British Formula Three Championship. Johnny Herbert took the BARC/BRDC Lucas British Formula 3 Championship. There was also a "Class B" championship for older cars, called "National Class', which was won by British driver Gary Dunn, driving a Reynard 863-Volkswagen for Swindon Motorsport.

The season saw chassis from both Ralt and Reynard Motorsport prove competitive, with TOM's-tuned Toyota engines, Spiess-tuned Volkswagen engines, and twinspark Alfa Romeo engines all competitive options.

The scoring system was 9-6-4-3-2-1 points awarded to the first six finishers, with one extra point added to the driver who set the fastest lap of the race.

== BARC/BRDC Lucas British F3 Championship ==
Champion: (United Kingdom) Johnny Herbert

Runner Up: (Belgium) Bertrand Gachot

National Champion: (United Kingdom) Gary Dunn

== Results ==
=== Lucas British Formula 3 Championship ===
Date	Round	Circuit	Winning driver	Winning team	Winning car
15/03/1987	Rd.1	(United Kingdom) Thruxton	(United Kingdom) Johnny Herbert	Eddie Jordan Racing	Reynard 873-Volkswagen
05/04/1987	Rd.2	(United Kingdom) Brands Hatch	(United Kingdom) Johnny Herbert	Eddie Jordan Racing	Reynard 873-Volkswagen
12/04/1987	Rd.3	(United Kingdom) Silverstone	(Australia) Gary Brabham	Jack Brabham Racing	Ralt RT31-Volkswagen
20/04/1987	Rd.4	(United Kingdom) Thruxton	(United Kingdom) Johnny Herbert	Eddie Jordan Racing	Reynard 873-Volkswagen
04/05/1987	Rd.5	(United Kingdom) Silverstone	(United Kingdom) Johnny Herbert	Eddie Jordan Racing	Reynard 873-Volkswagen
17/05/1987	Rd.6	(United Kingdom) Brands Hatch	(Belgium) Bertrand Gachot	West Surrey Racing	Ralt RT31-Alfa Romeo
25/05/1987	Rd.7	(United Kingdom) Thruxton	(Sweden) Thomas Danielsson	Madgwick Motorsport	Reynard 873-Alfa Romeo
07/06/1987	Rd.8	(United Kingdom) Silverstone	(United Kingdom) Johnny Herbert	Eddie Jordan Racing	Reynard 873-Volkswagen
26/06/1987	Rd.9	(Netherlands) Zandvoort	(United Kingdom) Damon Hill	Intersport Racing	Ralt RT31-Toyota
05/07/1987	Rd.10	(United Kingdom) Donington Park	(Switzerland) Philippe Favre	Reynard R+D	Reynard 873-Alfa Romeo
12/07/1987	Rd.11	(United Kingdom) Silverstone	(Belgium) Bertrand Gachot	West Surrey Racing	Ralt RT31-Alfa Romeo
02/08/1987	Rd.12	(United Kingdom) Snetterton	(Sweden) Thomas Danielsson	Madgwick Motorsport	Reynard 873-Alfa Romeo
21/08/1987	Rd.13	(United Kingdom) Donington Park	(Australia) Gary Brabham	Jack Brabham Racing	Ralt RT31-Volkswagen
15/08/1987	Rd.14	(United Kingdom) Oulton Park	(United Kingdom) Martin Donnelly	Intersport Racing	Ralt RT31-Toyota
31/08/1987	Rd.15	(United Kingdom) Silverstone	(Sweden) Thomas Danielsson	Madgwick Motorsport	Reynard 873-Alfa Romeo
06/09/1987	Rd.16	(United Kingdom) Brands Hatch	(United Kingdom) Martin Donnelly	Intersport Racing	Ralt RT31-Toyota
13/09/1987	Rd.17	(Belgium) Spa-Francorchamps	(United Kingdom) Damon Hill	Intersport Racing	Ralt RT31-Toyota
18/10/1987	Rd.18	(United Kingdom) Thruxton	(Belgium) Bertrand Gachot	West Surrey Racing	Ralt RT31-Alfa Romeo

=== Valid for the 1987 EFDA Formula 3 Euroseries ===
Date	Race	Circuit	Winning driver	Winning team	Winning car
11/10/1987	Cellnet Superprix	(United Kingdom) Brands Hatch	(United Kingdom) Johnny Herbert	Eddie Jordan Racing	Reynard-Volkswagen 873

== Championship Tables ==
=== Class A ===
Place	Driver	Entrant	Total
1	(United Kingdom) Johnny Herbert	Eddie Jordan Racing	79
2	(Belgium) Bertrand Gachot	West Surrey Racing	64
3	(United Kingdom) Martin Donnelly	Swallow Racing; Intersport Racing	61
4	(Sweden) Thomas Danielsson	Madgwick Motorsport	56
5	(United Kingdom) Damon Hill	Intersport Racing	49
6	(Australia) Gary Brabham	Jack Brabham Racing	37
7	(Switzerland) Philippe Favre	Reynard R+D	23
8	(United Kingdom) Perry McCarthy	Madgwick Motorsport	22
9	(United Kingdom) Steve Kempton	Terropol Promotions; Reynard R+D	18
10	(Netherlands) Peter Kox	Mick Rowe Racing	17
10	(Sweden) Niclas Schönström	Swallow Racing	17
12	(Austria) Roland Ratzenberger	West Surrey Racing	10
13	(United Kingdom) Mark Blundell	TOM’S GB	6
14	(United Kingdom) Ross Hockenhull	Richard Dutton Racing	3
15	(Switzerland) Jean-Denis Délétraz	KTR Racing	2
15	(United Kingdom) Graham de Zille	Pegasus Motorsport	2
17	(United Kingdom) Phil Andrews	Isis F3 Racing; Madgwick Motorsport	1
17	(Republic of Ireland) Mark Galvin	Alan Docking Racing	1
17	(Belgium) André Malherbe	Sport Auto Racing	1
17	(Brazil) Oswaldo Negri	Techspeed Racing	1

=== National Class ===
Place	Driver	Entrant	Total
1	(United Kingdom) Gary Dunn	Swallow Racing	138
2	(United Kingdom) Alastair Lyall	Gerard Racing	84
3	(United Kingdom) Gary Ward	RGS Racing	69
4	(United Kingdom) Peter Boutwood	Roger Cowman Racing	19
etc.
