= 1988 Scottish Superprix =

Layout of the Knockhill (1974–present)

The 1988 Scottish Superprix, saw the cars from the British Formula Three series visit Knockhill, north of Dunfermline, for a non-championship race, on 7 August.

== Report ==
=== Entry ===
A total of just eight F3 cars were entered for this the first of two non-British Championship races in 1988.

=== Qualifying ===
Gary Brabham took pole position for Jack Brabham Racing team in their Volkswagen-engined Ralt RT32, averaging a speed of 89.821 mph.

=== Race ===
The race was held over 25 laps of the Knockhill circuit. Gary Brabham took the winner spoils for the Jack Brabham Racing team, driving their Ralt-Volkswagen RT32. The Australian won in a time of 22:10.8mins., averaging a speed of 87.911 mph. Second place went to Ross Hockenhull in Bowman Racing’s Ralt-Volkswagen RT32, who was 5.1s behind. The Reynard 873 of Scott Stringfellow completed the podium for the Jim Lee Racing.

== Classification ==
=== Race ===
Pos.	Driver	Entrant	Car - Engine	Time, Laps	Reason Out
1st	(Australia) Gary Brabham	Jack Brabham Racing	Ralt-Volkswagen RT32	22.10.8	
2nd	(United Kingdom) Ross Hockenhull	Bowman Racing	Ralt-Volkswagen RT32	22:15.9	
3rd	(United Kingdom) Scott Stringfellow	Jim Lee Racing/Hippodrome	Reynard-Volkswagen 873	22:38.2	
4th	(United Kingdom) Sandy McEwan	Jupiter Racing	Ralt-Volkswagen RT30	22:56.3	
5th	(United Kingdom) John Fyda	Jupiter Racing	Ralt-Volkswagen RT30	24	
DNF	(United Kingdom) Tom Brown	JB Racing	Reynard-Volkswagen 873	9	Misfire
DNF	(United Kingdom) Martin Donnelly	Cellnet Ricoh Racing/Intersport Racing	Ralt-Toyota RT31	0	Crash
DNF	(United Kingdom) Damon Hill	Cellnet Ricoh Racing/Intersport Racing	Ralt-Toyota RT32	0	Crash

- Fastest lap: Gary Brabham, 52.5ecs. (89.137 mph)
