= 1988 British Formula Three Championship =

1988 British Formula 3 International Series

Seasons
- ← 1987 1989 →

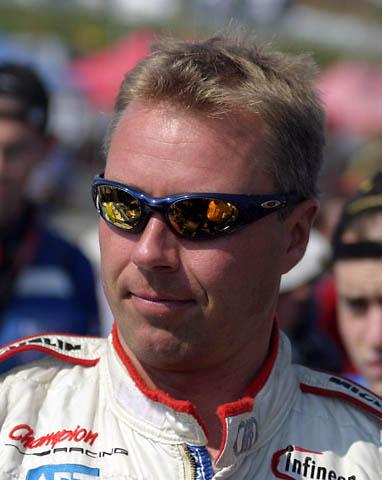
1988 champion, JJ Lehto

The 1988 British Formula Three season was the 38th season of the British Formula Three Championship. JJ Lehto took the BARC/BRDC Lucas British Formula 3 Championship.

The scoring system was 9-6-4-3-2-1 points awarded to the first six classified finishers, with one extra point added to the driver who set the fastest lap of the race. All results counted to the final tally.

== BARC/BRDC Lucas British F3 Championship ==
Champion: (Finland) JJ Lehto

Runner Up: (Australia) Gary Brabham

Class B Champion: (United Kingdom) Alastair Lyall

== Results ==
=== Lucas British Formula 3 Championship ===
Date	Round	Circuit	Winning driver	Winning team	Winning car
13/03/1988	Rd.1	(United Kingdom) Thruxton	(Finland) JJ Lehto	Pacific Racing/Marlboro	Reynard 883-Toyota
27/03/1988	Rd.2	(United Kingdom) Silverstone (short)	(Finland) JJ Lehto	Pacific Racing Team	Reynard 883-Toyota
04/04/1988	Rd.3	(United Kingdom) Thruxton	(United Kingdom) Martin Donnelly	Cellnet Ricoh Racing/Intersport Team	Ralt RT31-Toyota
17/04/1988	Rd.4	(United Kingdom) Brands Hatch	(United Kingdom) John Alcorn	Middlebridge Racing	Reynard 883-Toyota
24/04/1988	Rd.5	(United Kingdom) Donington Park	(United Kingdom) Martin Donnelly	Cellnet Ricoh Racing/Intersport Team	Ralt RT31-Volkswagen
02/05/1988	Rd.6	(United Kingdom) Silverstone (short)	(Finland) JJ Lehto	Pacific Racing Team	Reynard 883-Toyota
22/05/1988	Rd.7	(United Kingdom) Brands Hatch (Indy)	(Finland) JJ Lehto	Pacific Racing Team	Reynard 883-Toyota
30/05/1988	Rd.8	(United Kingdom) Thruxton	(United Kingdom) Damon Hill	Cellnet Ricoh Racing/Intersport Team	Ralt RT32-Toyota
05/06/1988	Rd.9	(United Kingdom) Silverstone	(Finland) JJ Lehto	Pacific Racing Team	Reynard 883-Toyota
03/07/1988	Rd.10	(United Kingdom) Donington Park	(Finland) JJ Lehto	Pacific Racing Team	Reynard 883-Toyota
09/07/1988	Rd.11	(United Kingdom) Silverstone	(United Kingdom) Damon Hill	Cellnet Ricoh Racing/Intersport Team	Ralt RT32-Toyota
31/07/1988	Rd.12	(United Kingdom) Snetterton	(United Kingdom) Martin Donnelly	Cellnet Ricoh Racing/Intersport Team	Ralt RT32-Toyota
21/08/1988	Rd.13	(United Kingdom) Oulton Park	(Australia) Gary Brabham	Bowman Racing	Ralt RT32-Volkswagen
29/08/1988	Rd.14	(United Kingdom) Silverstone (short)	(Finland) JJ Lehto	Pacific Racing Team	Reynard 883-Toyota
04/09/1988	Rd.15	(United Kingdom) Brands Hatch	(Australia) Gary Brabham	Bowman Racing	Ralt RT32-Volkswagen
17/08/1988	Rd.16	(Belgium) Spa-Francorchamps	(Finland) JJ Lehto	Pacific Racing Team	Reynard 883-Toyota
25/09/1988	Rd.17	(United Kingdom) Thruxton	(Australia) Gary Brabham	Bowman Racing	Ralt RT32-Volkswagen
02/10/1988	Rd.18	(United Kingdom) Silverstone	(Australia) Gary Brabham	Bowman Racing	Ralt RT32-Volkswagen

=== Non-Championship Races ===
Date	Race	Circuit	Winning driver	Winning team	Winning car
07/08/88	Scottish Superprix	(United Kingdom) Knockhill	(Australia) Gary Brabham	Jack Brabham Racing	Ralt RT32-Volkswagen
09/10/88	Cellnet Superprix	(United Kingdom) Brands Hatch	(Australia) Gary Brabham	Bowman Racing	Ralt RT32-Volkswagen

== Championship Tables ==
=== Class A ===
Place	Driver	Entrant	Car	Total
1	(Finland) JJ Lehto	Pacific Racing Team	Reynard 883-Toyota	113
2	(Australia) Gary Brabham	Bowman Racing	Ralt RT32-Volkswagen	81
3	(United Kingdom) Damon Hill	Cellnet Ricoh Racing/Intersport Team	Ralt RT32-Toyota	57
4	(United Kingdom) Martin Donnelly	Cellnet Ricoh Racing/Intersport Team	Ralt RT31-Toyota; Ralt RT32-Toyota	54
5	(United Kingdom) Eddie Irvine	West Surrey Racing	Ralt RT32-Alfa Romeo	53
6	(United Kingdom) Ross Hockenhull	Bowman Racing	Ralt RT32-Volkswagen	22
7	(United Kingdom) John Alcorn	Middlebridge Racing	Reynard 883-Toyota	21
8	(United Kingdom) Paul Warwick	Eddie Jordan Racing	Reynard 883-Volkswagen	18
9	(Switzerland) Philippe Favre	Alan Docking Racing	Reynard 883-Alfa Romeo	17
10	(United Kingdom) Jonathan Bancroft	Madgwick Motorsport	Reynard 883-Alfa Romeo	13
11	(United Kingdom) Jason Elliott	Eddie Jordan Racing	Reynard 883-Volkswagen	7
12	(Switzerland) Alain Menu	Anglia Cars Racefax	Ralt RT32-Volkswagen	4
12	(Austria) Roland Ratzenberger	Madgwick Motorsport	Reynard 883-Alfa Romeo	4
14	(Portugal) António Simões	West Surrey Racing	Ralt RT32-Alfa Romeo	2
14	(Netherlands) Peter Kox	Intersport Racing	Ralt RT32-Toyota	2
16	(Sweden) Rickard Rydell	Picko Troberg Racing	Reynard 883-Toyota; Ralt RT32-Volkswagen	1

=== Class B ===
Place	Driver	Entrant	Car	Total
1	(United Kingdom) Alastair Lyall	Swallow Racing	Reynard 873-Volkswagen	93
2	(Republic of Ireland) Rowan Dewhurst	Eddie Jordan Racing	Reynard 873-Volkswagen	91
3	(Australia) David Brabham	Jack Brabham Racing	Ralt RT31-Volkswagen	58
4	(United Kingdom) John Penfold	Jack Brabham Racing	Ralt RT31-Volkswagen	50
5	(United Kingdom) Scott Stringfellow	Jim Lee Racing	Reynard 873-Volkswagen	39
6	(United Kingdom) Gary Ward	RGS Racing	Reynard 873-Volkswagen	20
7	(New Zealand) Craig Simmis	CS Engineering	Reynard 873-Volkswagen	15
8	(United Kingdom) Ringo Hine	NSG Trenchwood	Reynard 873-Volkswagen	12
9	(United Kingdom) Steve Pettit	Jupiter Racing	Reynard 873-Volkswagen	11
10	(United Kingdom) Don Hardman	Don Hardman	Reynard 873-Volkswagen	9
10	(United Kingdom) Steve Bottoms	Vixen Racing	Reynard 873-Volkswagen/Spiess	9
12	(Australia) Tomas Mezera	Peter Lea Racing	Reynard 873-Volkswagen	8
13	(United Kingdom) David Germain	Industrial Process	Reynard 873-Volkswagen	7
13	(United Kingdom) Richard Reynolds	Eddie Jordan Racing	Reynard 873-Volkswagen	7
13	(Sweden) Robert Amrén	Alan Docking Racing	Reynard 873-Volkswagen	7
16	(Brazil) Gil de Ferran	Techspeed Racing	Reynard 873-Volkswagen	6
17	(United Kingdom) Sean Walker	Techspeed Racing	Reynard 873-Volkswagen	4
17	(United Kingdom) Paul Smith	Techspeed Racing	Reynard 873-Volkswagen	4
19	(United Kingdom) Robert Murphy	Jim Lee Racing	Reynard 873-Volkswagen	3
20	(United Kingdom) Eddie Kimbell	Peter Lea Racing	Reynard 873-Volkswagen	2
20	(United Kingdom) Gary Thomas	Richard Dutton Racing	Reynard 873-Volkswagen	2
20	(United Kingdom) Duncan Grey	CS Engineering	Reynard 873-Volkswagen	2
20	(United Kingdom) Geoff Janes	Autospeed Tyres	Reynard 873-Volkswagen	2
24	(United Kingdom) John Robinson	Jack Brabham Racing	Ralt RT31-Volkswagen	1
24	(United Kingdom) Ronnie Grant	Ronnie Grant	Ralt RT30-Volkswagen	1
24	(Italy) Guido Basile	Terropol Promotions	Ralt RT30-Volkswagen	1
