= John Alcorn =

John Alcorn may refer to:

- John Alcorn (singer), Canadian jazz singer
- John Alcorn (racing driver) (born 1964), retired British race car driver
- John Alcorn (artist) (1935–1992), American visual artist
