= 1991 12 Hours of Sebring =

Sports car endurance race

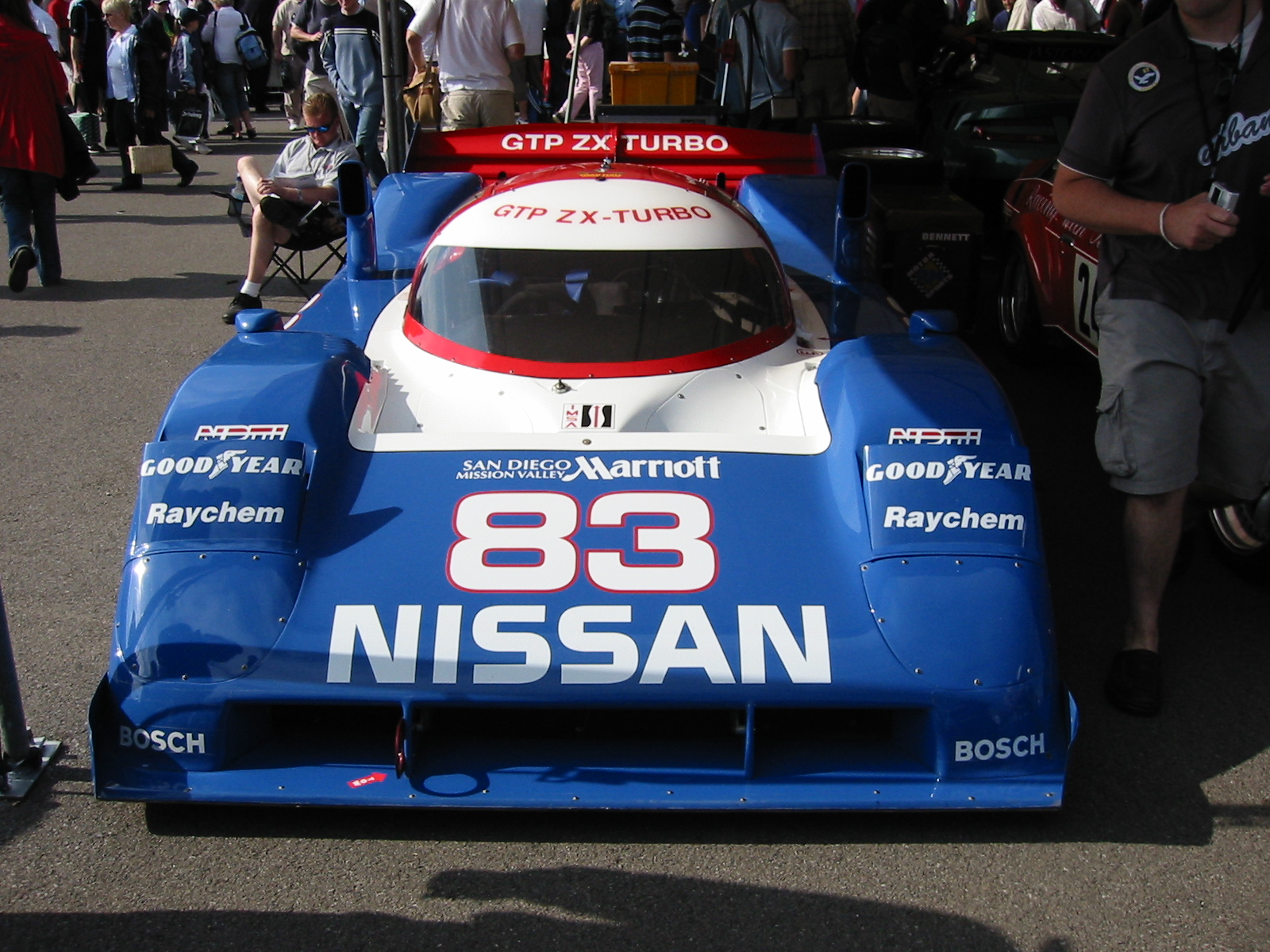
The race winning Nissan NPT-90 of Brabham/Daly/Brabham

The Nissan Present the 39th Annual 12 Hours of Sebring International Grand Prix of Endurance, was the third round of both the 1991 Camel GT Championship and Exxon Supreme GT Series and was held at the Sebring International Raceway, on 16 March.

== Report ==
=== Circuit ===
The Sebring circuit was changed from the previous year, being shortened from 4.11 miles to 3.7 miles, resembling the layout used today (with a few differences).

=== Entry ===
A total of 54 cars were entered for the event, across four classes ranging through GTO /GTU up to GTP. Of these 51 cars practised.

=== Qualifying ===
The Nissan NPT-90 of Geoff Brabham, partnered by Derek Daly and his younger brother, Gary Brabham took pole position. They were joined on the front row by their Nissan Performance team-mates Chip Robinson, Bob Earl and Julian Bailey.

=== Race ===
In front of a crowd of approximately 80,000, the race was held over 12 Hours, on Sebring International Raceway. The race started in cool conditions, but finished wet. For most of the early running, the #6 Joest Racing Porsche 962C of Bob Wollek, Bernd Schnieder and Massimo Sigala lead. Apart from pit stops, this car lead until lap 80, when the pole winning Nissan took control of the race. The Brabham brothers and Daly would lead from lap 81 until their saw the flag on lap 298. In between, their team-mates (Robinson/Earl/Bailey) would lead a total of 41 laps, losing the lead for the last time, just six laps from home. During the race, there were seven full-course cautions covering 54 laps, lasting a total of 3 hours and 14 minutes. Despite this Brabham/Daly/Brabham took the winner spoils for Don Devendorf’s Nissan Performance Technology Inc. team. This partnership, driving their Nissan NPT-90, won in a time of 12hr 02:01.391mins., averaging a speed of 91.626 mph. They covered a distance of 1,102.6 miles. One lap adrift in second place was their fellow Nissan NPT-90 of Robinson/Earl/Bailey. Early front runners, Wolleck/Schnieder/Sigala brought their Porsche home at third just another lap further back. Another Porsche from Joest came home in fourth, driven by Frank Jelinski, Henri Pescarolo and ”John Winter”.

The top Jaguar was fifth in the hands of Davy Jones, Raul Boesel and John Nielsen.

== Classification ==
=== Sebring 12 hours ===
Class Winners are in Bold text.

Pos	Class	No	Team	Drivers	Chassis	Tyre	Laps
Pos	Class	No	Team	Drivers	Engine	Tyre	Laps
1	**GTP**	**83**	**(United States) Nissan Performance Technology**	**(Australia) Geoff Brabham (Republic of Ireland) Derek Daly (Australia) Gary Brabham**	**Nissan NPT-90**	G	**298**
1	**GTP**	**83**	**(United States) Nissan Performance Technology**	**(Australia) Geoff Brabham (Republic of Ireland) Derek Daly (Australia) Gary Brabham**	**Nissan 3.0L Turbo V6**	G	**298**
2	GTP	84	(United States) Nissan Performance Technology	(United States) Chip Robinson (United States) Bob Earl (United Kingdom) Julian Bailey	Nissan NPT-90	G	297
2	GTP	84	(United States) Nissan Performance Technology	(United States) Chip Robinson (United States) Bob Earl (United Kingdom) Julian Bailey	Nissan 3.0L Turbo V6	G	297
3	GTP	6	(Germany) Joest Porsche Racing	(France) Bob Wollek (Germany) Bernd Schneider (Italy) Massimo Sigala	Porsche 962C	G	296
3	GTP	6	(Germany) Joest Porsche Racing	(France) Bob Wollek (Germany) Bernd Schneider (Italy) Massimo Sigala	Porsche 3.0L Turbo Flat-6	G	296
4	GTP	7	(Germany) Joest Porsche Racing	(Germany) Frank Jelinski (France) Henri Pescarolo (Germany) "John Winter"	Porsche 962C	G	295
4	GTP	7	(Germany) Joest Porsche Racing	(Germany) Frank Jelinski (France) Henri Pescarolo (Germany) "John Winter"	Porsche 3.0L Turbo Flat-6	G	295
5	GTP	3	(United Kingdom) Bud Light/Jaguar Racing	(United States) Davy Jones (Brazil) Raul Boesel (Denmark) John Nielsen	Jaguar XJR-12D	G	284
5	GTP	3	(United Kingdom) Bud Light/Jaguar Racing	(United States) Davy Jones (Brazil) Raul Boesel (Denmark) John Nielsen	Jaguar 6.5L V12	G	284
6	GTP	4	(United States) Tom Milner Racing	(United States) Brian Bonner (United States) Scott Sharp (United States) Jeff Kline	Spice SE89P	G	283
6	GTP	4	(United States) Tom Milner Racing	(United States) Brian Bonner (United States) Scott Sharp (United States) Jeff Kline	Chevrolet 6.0L V8	G	283
7	**Lights**	**8**	**(United States) Essex Racing**	**(United States) Charles Morgan (United States) Jim Pace**	**Kudzu DG-1**	G	**280**
7	**Lights**	**8**	**(United States) Essex Racing**	**(United States) Charles Morgan (United States) Jim Pace**	**Buick 3.0L V6**	G	**280**
8	**GTO**	**15**	**(United States) Roush Racing**	**(United States) Max Jones (United States) Robby Gordon**	**Ford Mustang**	G	**279**
8	**GTO**	**15**	**(United States) Roush Racing**	**(United States) Max Jones (United States) Robby Gordon**	**Ford 6.0L V8**	G	**279**
9	GTP	10	(United States) Hotchkiss Racing	(United States) Chris Cord (Brazil) Jim Adams (United States) John Hotchkiss	Spice SE90P	G	278
9	GTP	10	(United States) Hotchkiss Racing	(United States) Chris Cord (Brazil) Jim Adams (United States) John Hotchkiss	Pontiac 6.0L V8	G	278
10	GTP	30	(Germany) Momo/Gebhardt Racing	(Italy) Giampiero Moretti (Germany) Hellmut Mundas (Sweden) Stanley Dickens	Porsche 962C	G	277
10	GTP	30	(Germany) Momo/Gebhardt Racing	(Italy) Giampiero Moretti (Germany) Hellmut Mundas (Sweden) Stanley Dickens	Porsche 3.0L Turbo Flat-6	G	277
11	GTO	75	(United States) Clayton Cunningham Racing	(Canada) Jeremy Dale (New Zealand) Steve Millen (United States) Johnny O'Connell	Nissan 300ZX	Y	277
11	GTO	75	(United States) Clayton Cunningham Racing	(Canada) Jeremy Dale (New Zealand) Steve Millen (United States) Johnny O'Connell	Nissan 2.8L Turbo V6	Y	277
12	GTO	63	(United States) Mazda USA	(United States) John O'Steen (United States) Price Cobb	Mazda RX-7	G	284
12	GTO	63	(United States) Mazda USA	(United States) John O'Steen (United States) Price Cobb	Mazda 2.6L 4-rotor	G	284
13	GTO	12	(United States) Roush Racing	(United States) Dorsey Schroeder (United States) John Fergus	Ford Mustang	G	271
13	GTO	12	(United States) Roush Racing	(United States) Dorsey Schroeder (United States) John Fergus	Ford 6.0L V8	G	271
14	GTO	62	(United States) Mazda USA	(United Kingdom) Calvin Fish (United States) Pete Halsmer (United States) John Morton	Mazda RX-7	G	270
14	GTO	62	(United States) Mazda USA	(United Kingdom) Calvin Fish (United States) Pete Halsmer (United States) John Morton	Mazda 2.6L 4-rotor	G	270
15	Lights	33	(United Kingdom) Spice Engineering USA	(Italy) Almo Coppelli (United States) Jay Hill	Spice SE90P	G	265
15	Lights	33	(United Kingdom) Spice Engineering USA	(Italy) Almo Coppelli (United States) Jay Hill	Buick 3.0L V6	G	265
16	GTO	92	(United States) Morrison Motorsports	(United Kingdom) Andy Pilgrim (United States) R. K. Smith	Chevrolet Corvette ZR-1	G	260
16	GTO	92	(United States) Morrison Motorsports	(United Kingdom) Andy Pilgrim (United States) R. K. Smith	Chevrolet 5.7L V8	G	260
17	**GTU**	**95**	**(United States) Leitzinger Racing**	**(United States) Bob Leitzinger (United States) David Loring**	**Nissan 240SX**	T	**257**
17	**GTU**	**95**	**(United States) Leitzinger Racing**	**(United States) Bob Leitzinger (United States) David Loring**	Nissan 3.0L V6	T	**257**
18 DNF	GTP	99	(United States) All American Racers	(Argentina) Juan Manuel Fangio II (United States) Willy T. Ribbs	Eagle-Toyota HF90	G	256
18 DNF	GTP	99	(United States) All American Racers	(Argentina) Juan Manuel Fangio II (United States) Willy T. Ribbs	Toyota 3S-GTM 2.1L Turbo I4	G	256
19	GTO	90	(United States) Roush Racing	(United States) Jim Stevens (United States) James Jaeger (United States) Don Walker	Ford Mustang	G	250
19	GTO	90	(United States) Roush Racing	(United States) Jim Stevens (United States) James Jaeger (United States) Don Walker	Ford 6.0L V8	G	250
20	GTU	26	(United States) Alex Job Racing	(United States) Alex Job (United States) Peter Kraft (United States) Jack Refenning	Porsche 911	G	247
20	GTU	26	(United States) Alex Job Racing	(United States) Alex Job (United States) Peter Kraft (United States) Jack Refenning	Porsche 3.2L Flat-6	G	247
21	Lights	18	(United States) Carlos Bobeda Racing	(United States) Andy Evans (United States) George Robinson (United States) Carlos Bobeda	Spice SE90P	G	236
21	Lights	18	(United States) Carlos Bobeda Racing	(United States) Andy Evans (United States) George Robinson (United States) Carlos Bobeda	Buick 3.0L V6	G	236
22	GTU	69	(United States) North Coast Racing	(United States) Brad Hoyt (United States) Leighton Reese	Mazda RX-7	F	234
22	GTU	69	(United States) North Coast Racing	(United States) Brad Hoyt (United States) Leighton Reese	Mazda 1.3L 2-rotor	F	234
23	GTU	82	(United States) Greer Racing	(United States) Dick Greer (United States) Al Bacon (United States) Peter Uria	Mazda RX-7	G	232
23	GTU	82	(United States) Greer Racing	(United States) Dick Greer (United States) Al Bacon (United States) Peter Uria	Mazda 1.3L 2-rotor	G	232
24	Lights	54	(United States) HDF Motorsports	(United States) Michael Dow (Canada) David Tennyson (United States) Ken Knott	Spice SE89P	G	227
24	Lights	54	(United States) HDF Motorsports	(United States) Michael Dow (Canada) David Tennyson (United States) Ken Knott	Buick 3.0L V6	G	227
25 DNF	GTP	24	(United States) John Shapiro	(United Kingdom) James Weaver (United States) John Paul Jr.	Porsche 962 GTi	G	218
25 DNF	GTP	24	(United States) John Shapiro	(United Kingdom) James Weaver (United States) John Paul Jr.	Porsche 3.0L Turbo Flat-6	G	218
26	GTU	57	(United States) Kryderacing	(United States) Reed Kryder (United States) Frank Del Vecchio (United States) Joe Danaher	Nissan 240SX	G	207
26	GTU	57	(United States) Kryderacing	(United States) Reed Kryder (United States) Frank Del Vecchio (United States) Joe Danaher	Nissan 3.0L V6	G	207
27 DNF	Lights	48	(United States) Comptech Racing	(United States) Parker Johnstone (United States) Doug Peterson	Spice SE90P	BF	204
27 DNF	Lights	48	(United States) Comptech Racing	(United States) Parker Johnstone (United States) Doug Peterson	Acura 3.0L V6	BF	204
28	GTO	04	(United States) Henry Brosnaham	(United States) Henry Brosnaham (United States) Steve Roberts (United States) Bobby Scolo (United States) Paul Mazzacane (Canada) Richard Andison	Chevrolet Camaro	G	166
28	GTO	04	(United States) Henry Brosnaham	(United States) Henry Brosnaham (United States) Steve Roberts (United States) Bobby Scolo (United States) Paul Mazzacane (Canada) Richard Andison	Chevrolet 5.9L V8	G	166
29 DNF	GTP	5	(United States) Tom Milner Racing	(United States) Tim McAdam (United States) Jeff Purner (United States) Fred Phillips	Spice SE89P	G	165
29 DNF	GTP	5	(United States) Tom Milner Racing	(United States) Tim McAdam (United States) Jeff Purner (United States) Fred Phillips	Chevrolet 6.0L V8	G	165
30 DNF	Lights	80	(Canada) Bieri Racing	(Italy) Ruggero Melgrati (Italy) Martino Finotto (Spain) Fermín Vélez	Spice SE89P	G	147
30 DNF	Lights	80	(Canada) Bieri Racing	(Italy) Ruggero Melgrati (Italy) Martino Finotto (Spain) Fermín Vélez	Ferrari 3.0L V8	G	147
31 DNF	GTU	37	(Colombia) Botero Racing	(New Zealand) Rob Wilson (Colombia) Felipe Solano (Colombia) Francisco López (Colombia) Honorato Espinosa	Mazda MX-6	Y	140
31 DNF	GTU	37	(Colombia) Botero Racing	(New Zealand) Rob Wilson (Colombia) Felipe Solano (Colombia) Francisco López (Colombia) Honorato Espinosa	Mazda 1.3L 2-rotor	Y	140
32 DNF	Lights	40	(Canada) Bieri Racing	(Canada) Uli Bieri (Canada) John Graham	Alba AR2	G	138
32 DNF	Lights	40	(Canada) Bieri Racing	(Canada) Uli Bieri (Canada) John Graham	Ferrari 3.0L V8	G	138
33 DNF	GTO	91	(United States) Morrison Motorsports	(United States) Scott Hayter (United States) Scott Lagasse (United States) Don Knowles	Chevrolet Corvette ZR-1	G	134
33 DNF	GTO	91	(United States) Morrison Motorsports	(United States) Scott Hayter (United States) Scott Lagasse (United States) Don Knowles	Chevrolet 5.7L V8	G	134
34 DNF	Lights	9	(United States) Essex Racing	(United States) Tom Hessert (Greece) Costas Los	Kudzu DG-1	G	128
34 DNF	Lights	9	(United States) Essex Racing	(United States) Tom Hessert (Greece) Costas Los	Buick 3.0L V6	G	128
35 DNF	GTU	94	(United States) Guy W. Church	(United States) E. J. Generotti (United States) Paul Tavilla (United States) Guy W. Church	Mazda RX-7	G	113
35 DNF	GTU	94	(United States) Guy W. Church	(United States) E. J. Generotti (United States) Paul Tavilla (United States) Guy W. Church	Mazda 1.3L 2-rotor	G	113
36 DNF	GTO	53	(United States) Bill McDill	(United States) Richard McDill (United States) Bill McDill	Chevrolet Camaro	Y	112
36 DNF	GTO	53	(United States) Bill McDill	(United States) Richard McDill (United States) Bill McDill	Chevrolet 6.0L V8	Y	112
37 DNF	GTU	72	(United States) Jay Kjoller Motorsports	(United States) Jay Kjoller (United States) Patrick Mooney (United States) Steve Volk	Porsche 911	G	108
37 DNF	GTU	72	(United States) Jay Kjoller Motorsports	(United States) Jay Kjoller (United States) Patrick Mooney (United States) Steve Volk	Porsche 3.2L Flat-6	G	108
38 DNF	GTU	41	(United States) Red Line Racing	(United States) David Russell Jr. (United States) Michael Graham (United States) Cameron Worth	BMW 325i	G	103
38 DNF	GTU	41	(United States) Red Line Racing	(United States) David Russell Jr. (United States) Michael Graham (United States) Cameron Worth	BMW 2.8L I6	G	103
39 DNF	GTP	98	(United States) All American Racers	(United States) Rocky Moran (United Kingdom) Andy Wallace	Eagle-Toyota HF90	G	82
39 DNF	GTP	98	(United States) All American Racers	(United States) Rocky Moran (United Kingdom) Andy Wallace	Toyota 3S-GTE 2.1L Turbo I4	G	82
40 DNF	Lights	09	(United States) R. J. Racing	(United States) Tommy Johnson (United States) Bob Robertson (United Kingdom) John Sheldon	Tiga GC287	G	82
40 DNF	Lights	09	(United States) R. J. Racing	(United States) Tommy Johnson (United States) Bob Robertson (United Kingdom) John Sheldon	Buick 3.0L V6	G	82
41 DNF	GTO	87	(United States) Powertron	(United States) Anthony Puloe (United States) John Annis (United States) Tom Panaggio (United States) Tom Walsh	Chevrolet Camaro	G	75
41 DNF	GTO	87	(United States) Powertron	(United States) Anthony Puloe (United States) John Annis (United States) Tom Panaggio (United States) Tom Walsh	Chevrolet 6.0L V8	G	75
42 DNF	GTP	21	(United States) Alucraft	(United States) Hurley Haywood (Switzerland) René Herzog (South Africa) Wayne Taylor (Switzerland) Daniel Müller	Porsche 962	G	70
42 DNF	GTP	21	(United States) Alucraft	(United States) Hurley Haywood (Switzerland) René Herzog (South Africa) Wayne Taylor (Switzerland) Daniel Müller	Porsche 3.0L Turbo Flat-6	G	70
43 DNF	GTU	96	(United States) Leitzinger Racing	(United States) Bob Leitzinger (United States) Chuck Kurtz (United States) Butch Leitzinger	Nissan 240SX	T	52
43 DNF	GTU	96	(United States) Leitzinger Racing	(United States) Bob Leitzinger (United States) Chuck Kurtz (United States) Butch Leitzinger	Nissan 3.0L V6	T	52
44 DNF	GTO	76	(United States) Clayton Cunningham Racing	(United States) Johnny O'Connell (Canada) Jeremy Dale (New Zealand) Steve Millen	Nissan 300ZX	Y	33
44 DNF	GTO	76	(United States) Clayton Cunningham Racing	(United States) Johnny O'Connell (Canada) Jeremy Dale (New Zealand) Steve Millen	Nissan 3.0L Turbo V6	Y	33
45 DNF	GTP	05	(United States) Tom Milner Racing	(United States) Craig Carter (United States) Les Delano (United States) Andy Petery	Fabcar GTP	G	75
45 DNF	GTP	05	(United States) Tom Milner Racing	(United States) Craig Carter (United States) Les Delano (United States) Andy Petery	Chevrolet 6.0L V8	G	75
46 DNF	GTO	52	(United States) Ken Bupp	(Canada) Robert Peters (Canada) Ken Bupp	Chevrolet Camaro	G	3
46 DNF	GTO	52	(United States) Ken Bupp	(Canada) Robert Peters (Canada) Ken Bupp	Chevrolet 5.9L V8	G	3
DNS	GTP	2	(United Kingdom) Bud Light/Jaguar Racing	(United States) Davy Jones (United Kingdom) Ken Acheson (Brazil) Raul Boesel	Jaguar XJR-12D	G	-
DNS	GTP	2	(United Kingdom) Bud Light/Jaguar Racing	(United States) Davy Jones (United Kingdom) Ken Acheson (Brazil) Raul Boesel	Jaguar 6.5L V12	G	-
DNQ	GTO	17	(United States) Beckett Racing	(United States) Don Beckett (United States) Scott Lieb (United States) Robert McElheny	Chevrolet Corvette		-
DNQ	GTO	17	(United States) Beckett Racing	(United States) Don Beckett (United States) Scott Lieb (United States) Robert McElheny	Chevrolet V8		-
DNQ	GTO	06	(United States) HiTex Corp.	(United States) Oma Kimbrough (United States) Mark Montgomery (United States) Hoyt Overbagh	Chevrolet Camaro	G	-
DNQ	GTO	06	(United States) HiTex Corp.	(United States) Oma Kimbrough (United States) Mark Montgomery (United States) Hoyt Overbagh	Chevrolet 5.9L V8	G	-

- Fastest lap: Bob Wollek, 1:51.120secs. (120.57 mph)

=== Class Winners ===
Class	Winners	
GTP	Brabham / Daly / Brabham	Nissan NPT-90
GTP Lights	Morgan / Pace	Spice-Chevrolet SE89P
GTO	Jones / Gordon	Ford Mustang
GTU	Leitzinger / Loring	Nissan 240SX
