= 1986 British Formula Three Championship =

Motor racing competition

1986 British Formula 3 International Series

Seasons
- ← 1985 1987 →

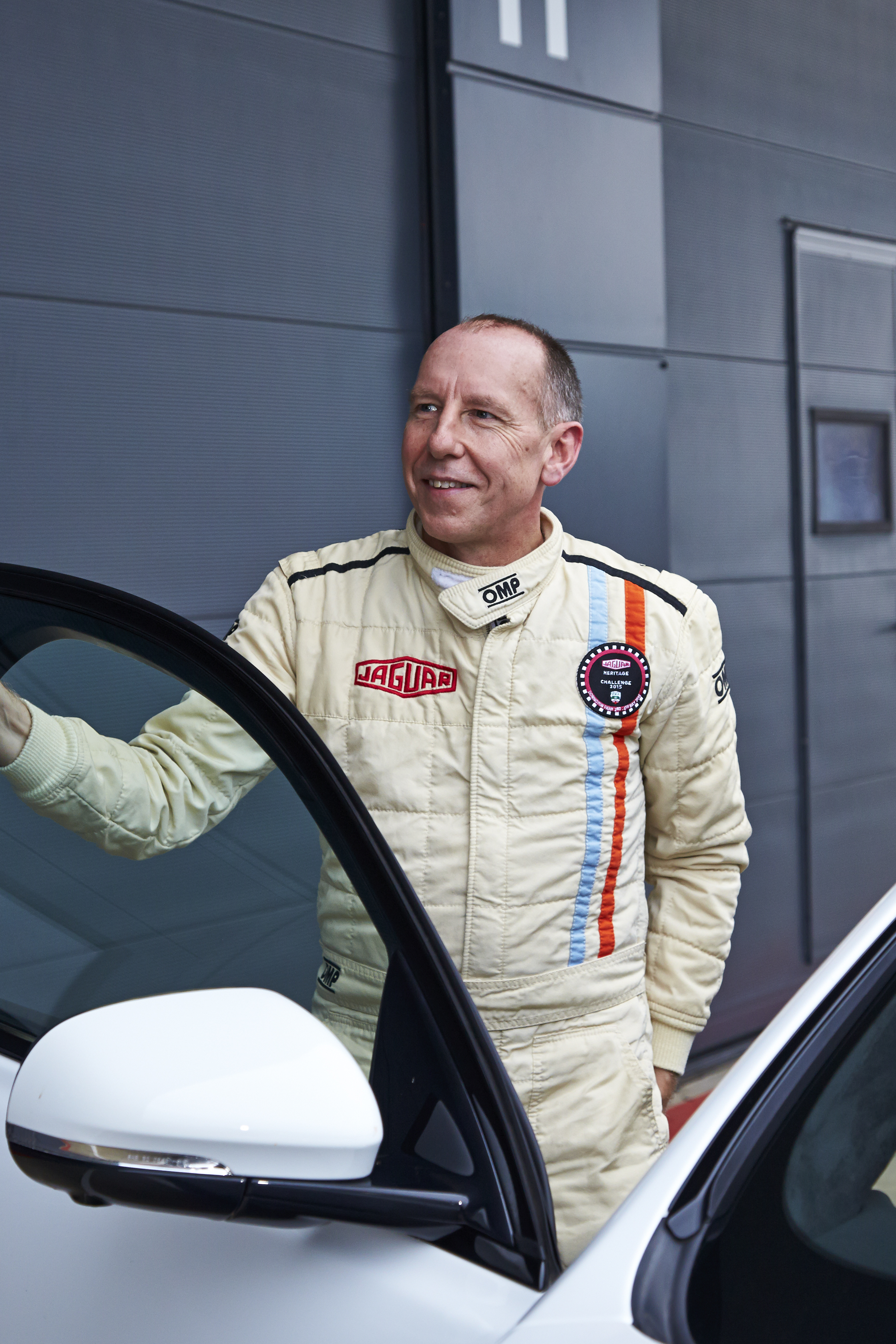
1986 champion, Andy Wallace

The 1986 British Formula Three season (known as the 1986 Lucas British F3 Championship for sponsorship reasons) was the 36th season of the British Formula Three Championship. Madgwick Motorsport's Andy Wallace took home the title after finishing runner-up in 1985. Maurizio Sandro Sala finishing runner-up.

== Race Calendar and Results ==
Round	Circuit	Date	Pole position	Winning driver	Winning team
1	(United Kingdom) Silverstone	2 March	Race cancelled		
2	(United Kingdom) Thruxton	9 March	(United Kingdom) Andy Wallace	(Brazil) Maurizio Sandro Sala	Stelrad Racing with EJR
3	(United Kingdom) Silverstone	23 March	(United Kingdom) Tim Davies	(United Kingdom) Andy Wallace	Madgwick Motorsport
4	(United Kingdom) Thruxton	31 March	(Brazil) Maurizio Sandro Sala	(Brazil) Maurizio Sandro Sala	Stelrad Racing with EJR
5	(United Kingdom) Silverstone	13 April	(Brazil) Maurizio Sandro Sala	(Brazil) Maurizio Sandro Sala	Stelrad Racing with EJR
6	(United Kingdom) Brands Hatch	20 April	(United Kingdom) Andy Wallace	(United Kingdom) Andy Wallace	Madgwick Motorsport
7	(United Kingdom) Thruxton	5 May	(Netherlands) Gerrit van Kouwen	(Netherlands) Gerrit van Kouwen	Pegasus Motorsport/Marlboro
8	(United Kingdom) Donington Park	18 May	(United Kingdom) Martin Donnelly	(United Kingdom) Martin Donnelly	Swallow Racing
9	(United Kingdom) Silverstone	26 May	(United Kingdom) Andy Wallace	(Brazil) Maurizio Sandro Sala	Stelrad Racing with EJR
10	(United Kingdom) Silverstone	8 June	(United Kingdom) Andy Wallace	(United Kingdom) Andy Wallace	Madgwick Motorsport
11	(United Kingdom) Oulton Park	21 June	(United Kingdom) Andy Wallace	(United Kingdom) Martin Donnelly	Swallow Racing
12	(Netherlands) Zandvoort	29 June	(United Kingdom) Andy Wallace	(United Kingdom) Andy Wallace	Madgwick Motorsport
13	(United Kingdom) Donington Park	20 July	(United Kingdom) Andy Wallace	(United States) Dave Simpson	Simpson Racing UK
14	(United Kingdom) Snetterton	11 August	(United Kingdom) Andy Wallace	(Brazil) Maurizio Sandro Sala	Stelrad Racing with EJR
15	(United Kingdom) Silverstone	25 August	(United Kingdom) Andy Wallace	(United Kingdom) Martin Donnelly	Swallow Racing
16	(United Kingdom) Brands Hatch	31 August	(United Kingdom) Andy Wallace	(United Kingdom) Andy Wallace	Madgwick Motorsport
17	(Belgium) Spa-Francorchamps	13 September	(United Kingdom) Andy Wallace	(United Kingdom) Andy Wallace	Madgwick Motorsport
18	(Belgium) Zolder	28 September	(United Kingdom) Andy Wallace	(United Kingdom) Andy Wallace	Madgwick Motorsport
19	(United Kingdom) Silverstone	5 October	(United Kingdom) Andy Wallace	(United Kingdom) Andy Wallace	Madgwick Motorsport

== Championship Standings ==
Place	Driver	Entrant	Total
1	(United Kingdom) Andy Wallace	Madgwick Motorsport	121
2	(Brazil) Maurizio Sandro Sala	Stelrad Racing with EJR	83
3	(United Kingdom) Martin Donnelly	Swallow Racing	59
4	(Netherlands) Gerrit van Kouwen	Pegasus Motorsport/Marlboro	24
5	(Australia) Gary Brabham	Jack Brabham Racing Ltd	22
