= 1987 Macau Grand Prix =

Formula Three motor race

Race details
Date	29 November 1987
Location	Guia Circuit, Macau
Course	Temporary street circuit 6.120 km (3.803 mi)
Distance	Race; 20 laps 122.4 km (76.1 mi) Race reduced to single 20-lap heat because of weather
- Race

Pole
Driver	(United Kingdom) Martin Donnelly	Intersport Engineering
Time	2:24.34

Fastest Lap
Driver	(Germany) Bernd Schneider	Schübel Rennsport Int.
Time	2:23.05

Podium
First	(United Kingdom) Martin Donnelly	Intersport Engineering
Second	(Netherlands) Jan Lammers	Intersport Engineering
Third	(Germany) Bernd Schneider	Schübel Rennsport Int.

The 1987 Macau Grand Prix Formula Three was the 34th Macau Grand Prix race to be held on the streets of Macau on 29 November 1987. It was the fourth edition for Formula Three cars. Heavy rain and strong winds from Typhoon Nina cancelled all of Saturday's activities and the starting order of the race was determined by the fastest lap times of the first practice session. Martin Donnelly of Intersport Engineering led the pack of cars going into Mandarin Oriental bend from pole position and led every lap to win. His teammate Jan Lammers finished second and Schubel Rennsport Int driver Bernd Schneider was third.

== Entry list ==
Team	No	Driver	Vehicle	Engine
(United Kingdom) Watsons Water Racing w/ Madgwick Motorsport	1	(United Kingdom) Andy Wallace	Reynard 873	Alfa Romeo
(United Kingdom) Watsons Water Racing w/ Madgwick Motorsport	2	(Sweden) Thomas Danielsson	Reynard 873	Alfa Romeo
(United Kingdom) Watsons Water Racing w/ Reynard R&D	3	(United Kingdom) Julian Bailey	Reynard 873	Alfa Romeo
(British Hong Kong) Marlboro Theodore Racing w/ West Surrey Racing	5	(Brazil) Maurício Gugelmin	Ralt RT31	Alfa Romeo
(British Hong Kong) Marlboro Theodore Racing w/ West Surrey Racing	6	(France) Bertrand Gachot	Ralt RT31	Alfa Romeo
(British Hong Kong) Marlboro Theodore Racing w/ Eddie Jordan Racing	7	(Italy) Emanuele Pirro	Reynard 873	Volkswagen
(British Hong Kong) Marlboro Theodore Racing w/ Eddie Jordan Racing	8	(United Kingdom) Johnny Herbert	Reynard 873	Volkswagen
(United Kingdom) Flying Tigers w/ Intersport Engineering	9	(Netherlands) Jan Lammers	Ralt RT31	Toyota
(United Kingdom) Flying Tigers w/ Intersport Engineering	10	(United Kingdom) Damon Hill	Ralt RT31	Toyota
(United Kingdom) Mr Juicy w/ Intersport Engineering	11	(United Kingdom) Martin Donnelly	Ralt RT31	Toyota
(Italy) Euroteam Cipa	12	(Italy) Stefano Modena	Reynard 873	Alfa Romeo
(Italy) Euroteam Cipa	14	(Italy) Eugenio Visco	Reynard 873	Alfa Romeo
(United Kingdom) David Price Racing	15	(New Zealand) Mike Thackwell	Reynard 873	Toyota
(France) ORECA	16	(France) Jean Alesi	Dallara 387	Alfa Romeo
(France) ORECA	17	(France) Didier Artzet	Dallara 387	Alfa Romeo
(Germany) Volkswagen Motorsport	18	(United Kingdom) Johnny Dumfries	Ralt RT31	Volkswagen
(Japan) Funaki Racing	20	(United States) Ross Cheever	Ralt RT30	Toyota
(France) Ecurie Elf	21	(France) Éric Bernard	Ralt RT31	Alfa Romeo
(Germany) West Schubel Rennsport Int.	23	(Germany) Bernd Schneider	Dallara 387	Volkswagen
(Germany) West WTS Racing Team	24	(Germany) Joachim Winkelhock	Reynard 873	Volkswagen
(Italy) Forti Corse	25	(Italy) Enrico Bertaggia	Dallara 387	Alfa Romeo
(Italy) Forti Corse	28	(Italy) Mauro Martini	Dallara 387	Alfa Romeo
(France) Equipe Serge Saulnier	26	(France) Fabien Giroix	Dallara 387	Alfa Romeo
(Japan) Team Kitamura	27	(Japan) Akiro Morimoto	Reynard 873	Toyota
Canon Team Sweden	29	(Sweden) Michael Johansson	Ralt RT31	Alfa Romeo
(Sweden) Picko Troberg Racing	30	(Sweden) Rickard Rydell	Reynard 873	Volkswagen
(Germany) Schroder Motorsport	31	(Germany) Hanspeter Kaufmann	Ralt RT31	Volkswagen
(France) DHL Le Mans Motor Corporation	32	(United Kingdom) David Scott	Ralt RT31	Nissan
(France) DHL Le Mans Motor Corporation	33	(Brazil) Maurizio Sandro Sala	Ralt RT31	Nissan
(Belgium) Sport Auto Racing	34	(Belgium) Éric Bachelart	Ralt RT31	Volkswagen
(France) KTR	35	(France) Didier Theys	Ralt RT31	Volkswagen
(Japan) KM2 Motorsport	36	(Japan) Shigeki Matsui	Reynard 873	Volkswagen
(Japan) VW Asia Motorsport	37	(Japan) Akihiko Nakaya	Ralt RT30	Volkswagen
