= Eagle HF89 =

Racing car

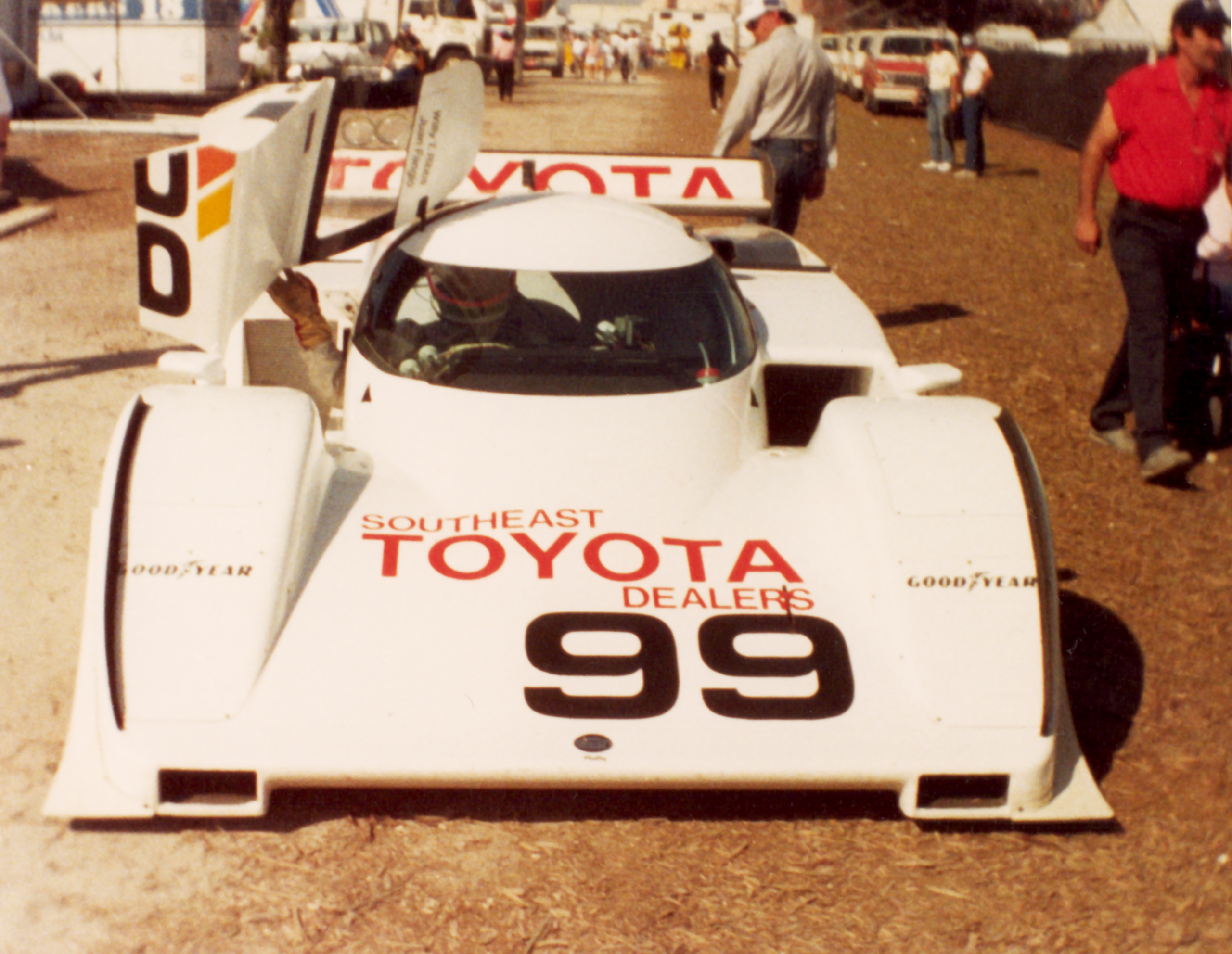
- The No. 99 HF89 at the 1989 Grand Prix of Miami
- Category: IMSA GTP sports prototype
- Constructor: All American Racers
- Designers: Ron Hopkins, Hiro Fujimori
- Successor: Eagle MkIII

Technical specifications
- Chassis: Aluminum honeycomb monocoque, with tubular steel roll cage
- Suspension (front): Double wishbone suspension, coil-spring over damper
- Suspension (rear): Double wishbone suspension, coil-spring over damper
- Engine: Toyota 3S-GTM 2100 cc Inline-4 Turbocharged, mid-mounted
- Transmission: Hewland 6 Manual transmission
- Fuel: Trick
- Tyres: Goodyear

Competition history
- Notable entrants: (United States) All-American Racers
- Notable drivers: (United States) Willy T. Ribbs (United States) Rocky Moran (Argentina) Juan Manuel Fangio II (United States) Chris Cord (United States) Drake Olson
- Debut: 1989 IMSA Grand Prix of Miami
- First win: 1990 Grand Prix of Heartland
- Last win: 1991 Grand Prix of Greater San Diego
- Last event: 1991 Grand Prix of Greater San Diego
Races	Wins	Poles	F/Laps
38	5	3	2
- Constructors' Championships: 0
- Drivers' Championships: 0

The Eagle HF89 and its evolution, the Eagle HF90, is a racing car built and entered by Dan Gurney's All American Racers team, for the IMSA GT Championship. It was raced from 1989 until 1991 in IMSA's premier sports-car racing category, the GTP (Grand Touring Prototype) division. The design was also sometimes called the Eagle MkII.

== Background ==
From 1983 until 1988, Dan Gurney's team entered cars in the IMSA GTO and GTU divisions, with Toyota Celicas as the basis for their cars. After claiming the driver's and constructors' championships in the GTO division in 1987 with driver Chris Cord, and a third place in the division the following year, the AAR team switched to the IMSA GTP division for 1989.

The team used two types of cars; the other chassis was a TOM'S Toyota 88C car (an FIA Group C-based car). Both were powered by a turbocharged, 2.1-liter inline-4 engine producing approximately 600 horsepower, which was similar to the engines AAR used in their IMSA GTO and GTU cars.

The "Eagle" marque was used by Dan Gurney's AAR team to denote their racing cars, the "HF" comes from the initials of the designers' surnames, Hopkins and Fujimori, and 89 from the two-digit year of its initial competition. Four chassis were constructed, and two were modified in 1990 and reclassified as HF90.

== History ==
The car made its debut at the 1989 IMSA Miami GTP race (car #99), but retired from the event with an engine timing belt malfunction. The team concentrated its efforts on the #98 car; AAR would not enter the HF89 until the Lime Rock GTP race. The car then completed its first race with a 5th-place finish at the following event at the Mid-Ohio GTP race. The HF89 did not finish any other races that season.

By 1990, the Eagle HF89 replaced the 88C, and chalked up its first win at the 1990 IMSA Topeka GTP event, with Juan Manuel Fangio II driving. The team followed up with three more wins: Sears Point, as well as temporary street course races at San Antonio and Del Mar.

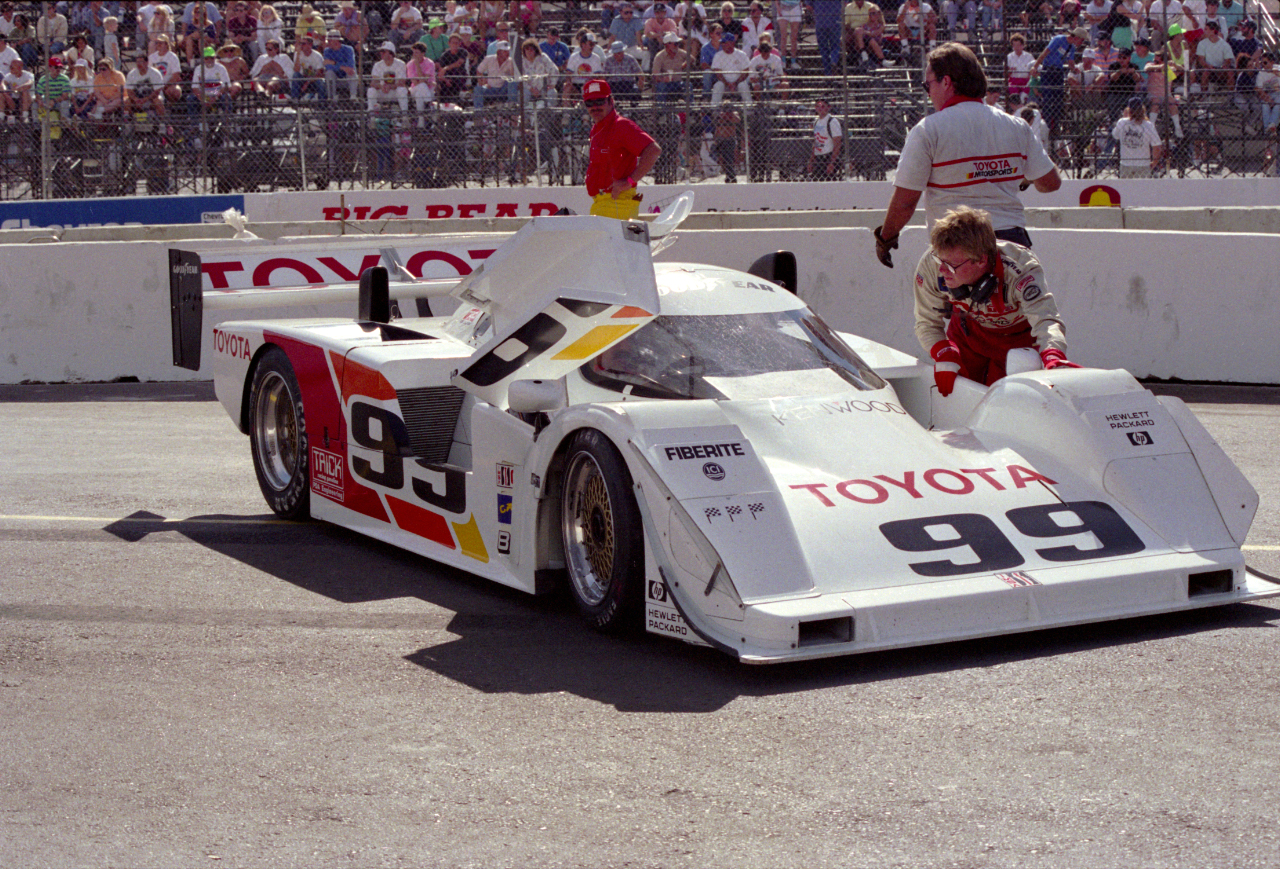
HF90, the evolution of the HF89, pictured at the 1990 Grand Prix of Greater San Diego

While the team experienced some success in 1989 and 1990 with the HF89 and HF90 evolution, the chassis had a very small margin for setup error - in the words of driver Juan Manuel Fangio II, "When were in the window, the car was good in every way, but out of the window, the car was not right at all." This led the team to prepare a clean-sheet design for 1991 - the Eagle MkIII.

In 1991, the HF89 won its final IMSA GTP race with Fangio driving, at the IMSA Camel Continental VIII at Watkins Glen. At the following GTP race at Laguna Seca, the Eagle MkIII made its race debut with AAR, which would eventually replace the Eagle HF89. The final race for the Eagle HF89 was at the IMSA GT race at Portland, where it finished in third place.
