= Gary Brabham =

Australian racing driver (born 1961)

- Born: Gary Thomas Brabham; 29 March 1961 (age 65); Wimbledon, London, England, United Kingdom
- Relatives: Sir Jack Brabham (father); Geoff Brabham (brother); David Brabham (brother); Matthew Brabham (nephew); Sam Brabham (nephew)

Formula One World Championship career
- Nationality: (Australia) Australian
- Active years: 1990
- Team: Life
- Entries: 2 (0 starts)
- Championships: 0
- Wins: 0
- Podiums: 0
- Career points: 0
- Pole positions: 0
- Fastest laps: 0
- First entry: 1990 United States Grand Prix
- Last entry: 1990 Brazilian Grand Prix

Indy Car World Series
- Years active: 1993–94
- Teams: Dick Simon Racing; Bettenhausen Motorsports
- Starts: 2
- Wins: 0
- Poles: 0
- Fastest laps: 0
- Best finish: 40th in 1993

Previous series
- 1982 1985 1986-88 1987 1989 1989-90 1990 1990-91 1991-92 1991: Australian Formula Ford; British Formula Ford 2000; British Formula 3 Championship; British Touring Car Championship; World Touring Car Championship; British Formula 3000 Championship; International Formula 3000; Formula 1 Australian Endurance Championship; IMSA GT Championship; Interserie

Championship titles
- 1988 1988 1988 1989 1991: International Gold Cup; Scottish Superprix; Cellnet Superprix; British Formula 3000; 12 Hours of Sebring

Gary Thomas Brabham (born 29 March 1961) is an Australian former professional racing driver and convicted child rapist. He is the son of three-time World Formula One Champion Sir Jack Brabham and the brother of Le Mans winners Geoff and David Brabham.

Brabham's solitary F1 berth came with Life, a team that failed to prequalify for a single F1 race in its lone season of existence. Brabham's career never fully recovered, despite winning the 1991 Sebring 12 Hours and being the first Australian to start the Gold Coast Indy Grand Prix. After his career, Brabham was convicted of child rape.

== Early life ==
Brabham, born in Wimbledon, England, was the second-born of the triple World Champion Sir Jack Brabham. Despite hopes from his mother that he would avoid the motor-racing scene altogether, he grew up on a diet of Formula Ford in both Australia and the UK.

Brabham made his racing debut in 1982, finishing his first race at Calder Park Raceway in third despite being in a nine-year-old car. He later broke the Formula Ford lap record at the Sandown Raceway in the same car.

== Career ==
=== Starter formulae ===
Later in 1982, Brabham was chosen to go to Europe for 1983. Despite very little support from the Australian public, he raced in the British Formula Ford 2000 Championship for Neil Trundle Racing, in a Reynard SF83. He finishing the season in 11th place. During this season, he also made his sports car-racing début, sharing a March-Ford 83S, with Alo Lawler at Brands Hatch.

For the following season, Brabham remained in the same series, joining Penistone Racing, partnering Julian Bailey in their Reynard SF84. He regularly outpaced his team-mate, and despite team orders not to outperform his team-mate, he still was not disgraced taking sixth overall in the final championship positions. During 1984, he tried his hand at other categories, including racing sport cars in the Thundersports Series, taking his maiden victory at Snetterton, sharing a Tiga-Ford TS84 with Tim Lee-Davey. With no top single-seater drives available for him in 1985, Brabham had a slight reprieve through the Thundersports series, where he raced for the TechSpeed Racing team in a Shrike-Ford P15 alongside Divina Galica, recording five second places.

In 1986, Brabham's father got a team together under the banner of Jack Brabham Racing. Gary raced in 9 of the 18 rounds of the British Formula 3 Championship in a Ralt-Volkswagen RT30, managing some decent results such as second at Silverstone. This was enough to take him to fifth in the championship. For 1987, the team had secured Panasonic backing for 15 of the 19 F3 races, in a Ralt-Volkswagen RT31. Brabham won two races at Silverstone and Donington Park, coming I sixth in the championship. He was threatening Johnny Herbert for the title until his budget tragically ran out.

During the 1987 season, Brabham made one-off appearances at Oulton Park in the British Touring Car Championship, and at Silverstone in the MG Maestro Challenge. In the latter, he notably battled for the lead with future F1 World Champion Damon Hill and won the race, though neither were eligible for points as they were guest drivers. He also contested a Ford Escort Celebrity race at Brands Hatch and finished 4th.

Brabham returned to Australia briefly to race in the 1987 James Hardie 1000 at Bathurst, sharing a works BMW M3 with Juan Manuel Fangio II. The car was up to fifth at one stage before Fangio glanced a stricken car in the rain. Brabham showed his speed late in the race, dicing and passing the Aussie legend Peter Brock. Although Brock would eventually win the race, Brabham and Fangio were classified 16th at the end.

For 1988, Brabham returned to England, joining Bowman Racing for a third season of British Formula 3. Although JJ Lehto won the championship, Brabham stormed home late in the season, winning four races in his Ralt-Volkswagen RT32 to finish second. On his way, he also won the Scottish Superprix and Oulton Park Gold Cup. This earned him his first chance to test a Formula One car. He tested a Benetton B188 at the behest of team manager, Peter Collins, at Jerez.

A chance to move up to International Formula 3000 arose in 1989, but the drive went to Andrea Chiesa, instead. Brabham settled for a drive with Bromley Motorsport, in the British Formula 3000 Championship, in an ex-Roberto Moreno Reynard-Cosworth 88D. He took this car to the inaugural title with four victories and pole positions along the way. During the season, he also managed to secure some outings in the International series for both Bromley and Leyton House teams, his best result being fifth at Brands Hatch.

Also, Brabham finished fifth at the 1988 Formula 3 Macau Grand Prix and sixth in 1989.

=== Life in F1 ===
After more F1 testing for Leyton House and Brabham teams, Brabham also assisted Porsche with their Indy car, before the opportunity arose to race in F1.

Brabham failed to prequalify for two Formula One Grands Prix with the troubled Life project, a team that failed to prequalify for all 14 of its attempts during the 1990 season. Brabham was the second-slowest prequalifier (leading only the Coloni-Subaru of Bertrand Gachot, who recorded a lap time of 5:15.010, but 30 seconds behind the EuroBrun of Claudio Langes) at Phoenix, and the engine gave up after only 400 m in Brazil. One small plus of the car was that it was the sixth-fastest car in a straight line in untimed practice in Brazil. After those two races, when clearly no improvement was forthcoming, Brabham promptly quit the team in disgust. He had a small chance to join the Brabham team at the time, but confusion over his Life contract caused him to lose the seat to his brother David.

=== After Formula One ===
For the remainder of 1990, Brabham raced in F3000 for Middlebridge Racing in their Lola-Mugen T89/50, collecting two third places at Monza and Enna. However, his bad luck continued as he failed to qualify for Pau and Birmingham. He returned to Australia for the Eastern Creek 500, teaming up with his brother David in a Ford Sierra RS500 for Frank Gardner’s team. The brothers finished fourth.

In 1991, Brabham went Stateside to the IMSA championship and drove for Nissan Performance Technology Inc. [NPTI] at the Sebring 12 Hours along his other brother Geoff and Irishman Derek Daly. Starting from pole, they won the race in their Nissan NPT-90. This victory did not open any more doors. Brabham settled for a series of one-off drives: a drive in an older Nissan at Miami, an outing in a Stürtz-BMW SM in an Interserie race at Brands Hatch and another visit to the Bathurst 1000.

Brabham accepted an invitation from NPTI to race in the IMSA Endurance races in 1992 alongside Daly and Steve Millen at Daytona, recording a DNF after running in third. At Sebring, the winning crew from 1991 was joined by Arie Luyendyk. This crew came close to defending the title, finishing second.

In 1993 and 1994, Brabham later raced in CART, becoming the first Australian driver to race the Gold Coast Indycar street race before retiring from racing in 1995 to teach advanced driver training. His pupils have included Rowan Atkinson and Captain Mark Phillips, for celebrities competing in the Australian and British GP celebrity races

== Criminal convictions ==
In 2009, Brabham pleaded guilty to charges of indecent dealing of a child under 12 years. Brabham managed to have his name suppressed as he served out his time in high security at Wacol jail.

In 2016, a Brisbane District Court 12-person jury found Brabham guilty of one charge of rape and one charge of indecent treatment of a child then aged six. The offences occurred between 2003 and 2007 in Brisbane. After the verdict was handed down, the court was told Brabham had a criminal history. In September, an appeal by Brabham against the conviction was unanimously rejected by the Queensland Court of Appeal. He was sentenced to 18 months in jail, but was released after 6 months.

== Racing record ==
=== Career highlights ===
| Season | Series | Position | Car | Team |
|---|---|---|---|---|
| 1982 | TAA Formula Ford Driver to Europe Series | 12th | Birrana-Ford | |
| 1983 | British Formula Ford 2000 Championship | 11th | Reynard SF83-Ford | Neil Trundle Racing |
| 1984 | BBC Grandstand Formula Ford 2000 Championship | 4th | Reynard SF84-Ford | Penistone Racing |
| 1984 | British Formula Ford 2000 Championship | 6th | Reynard SF84-Ford | Penistone Racing |
| 1986 | Lucas British Formula 3 Championship | 5th | Ralt RT30 Volkswagen | Jack Brabham Racing |
| 1987 | Lucas British Formula 3 Championship | 6th | Ralt RT31 Volkswagen | Jack Brabham Racing |
| 1988 | Lucas British Formula 3 Championship | **2nd** | Ralt RT32 Volkswagen | Bowman Racing |
| 1989 | British Formula 3000 Championship | **1st** | Reynard 88D Cosworth | Bromley Motorsport |
| 1989 | International Formula 3000 Championship | 17th | Reynard 88D Cosworth; March 89B Judd | Bromley Motorsport; Leyton House Racing |
| 1990 | Formula One World Championship | NC | Life L190 Life-W12 | Life Racing Engines |
| 1990 | International Formula 3000 Championship | 11th | Lola T90/50 Cosworth | Middlebridge Racing |
| 1990 | Australian Endurance Championship | 17th | Ford Sierra RS500 | Tony Longhurst Racing |
| 1991 | IMSA GTP Championship | 40th | Nissan NPT90; Nissan GTP ZX-T | Nissan Performance Technology |
| 1993 | CART World Series | 40th | Lola T92/00 - Chevrolet | Dick Simon Racing |
| 1994 | CART World Series | 52nd | Penske PC-22 - Ilmor | Bettenhausen Racing |

=== Complete British Formula Three Championship results ===
(key) (Races in bold indicate pole position) (Races in italics indicate fastest lap)

| Year | Entrant | 1 | 2 | 3 | 4 | 5 | 6 | 7 | 8 | 9 | 10 | 11 | 12 | 13 | 14 | 15 | 16 | 17 | 18 | Total | Points |
|---|---|---|---|---|---|---|---|---|---|---|---|---|---|---|---|---|---|---|---|---|---|
| 1986 | Jack Brabham Racing | THR; DNS | SIL; 6 | THR; 11 | SIL; 2 | BRH; 5 | THR | DON; 10 | SIL; 4 | SIL; DNS | OUL | ZAN | DON | SNE | SIL; 5 | BRH; 4 | SPA | ZOL; 15 | SIL; 4 | **5th** | **22** |
| 1987 | Jack Brabham Racing | THR; 5 | BRH; 2 | SIL; 1 | THR; 4 | SIL; Ret | BRH; 4 | THR; 7 | SIL; 9 | ZAN; Ret | DON; DNS | SIL; 33 | SNE; 7 | DON; 1 | OUL; 6 | SIL; 5 | BRH; DNS | SPA | THR | **6th** | **37** |
| 1988 | Bowman Racing | THR; 9 | SIL; 5 | THR; 2 | BRH; 3 | DON; Ret | SIL; 4 | BRH; 21 | THR; 2 | SIL; 4 | DON; 3 | SIL; 2 | SNE; 2 | OUL; 1 | SIL; 8 | BRH; 1 | SPA; 8 | THR; 1 | SIL; 1 | **2nd** | **81** |

=== Complete British Touring Car Championship results ===
(key) (Races in bold indicate pole position in class) (Races in italics indicate fastest lap in class - 1 point awarded)

| Year | Team | Car | Class | 1 | 2 | 3 | 4 | 5 | 6 | 7 | 8 | 9 | 10 | 11 | 12 | DC | Pts | Class |
|---|---|---|---|---|---|---|---|---|---|---|---|---|---|---|---|---|---|---|
| 1987 | Alan Docking Racing | Holden Commodore VK SS Group A | A | SIL | OUL | THR | THR | SIL | SIL | BRH | SNE | DON | OUL; Ret‡ | DON | SIL | NC | 0 | NC |

‡ Endurance driver (Ineligible for points)

=== Complete World Touring Car Championship results ===
(key) (Races in bold indicate pole position) (Races in italics indicate fastest lap)

| Year | Team | Car | 1 | 2 | 3 | 4 | 5 | 6 | 7 | 8 | 9 | 10 | 11 | DC | Points |
|---|---|---|---|---|---|---|---|---|---|---|---|---|---|---|---|
| 1987 | BMW Motorsport | BMW M3 | MNZ | JAR | DIJ | NUR | SPA | BNO | SIL | BAT ovr:16 cls:6 | CLD | WEL | FJI | NC | 0 |

† Not registered for series & points

=== Complete British Formula 3000 results ===
(key) (Races in bold indicate pole position) (Races in italics indicate fastest lap)

| Year | Entrant | 1 | 2 | 3 | 4 | 5 | 6 | 7 | 8 | 9 | Total | Points |
|---|---|---|---|---|---|---|---|---|---|---|---|---|
| 1989 | Bromley Motorsport | BRH; 3 | THR; 1 | **OUL**; 2 | DON; 6 | BRH; 1 | SNE; 5 | **SIL**; 1 | OUL; 2 | BRH; 1 | **1st** | **55** |

=== Complete International Formula 3000 results ===
(key) (Races in bold indicate pole position) (Races in italics indicate fastest lap)

| Year | Entrant | 1 | 2 | 3 | 4 | 5 | 6 | 7 | 8 | 9 | 10 | 11 | DC | Points |
|---|---|---|---|---|---|---|---|---|---|---|---|---|---|---|
| 1989 | Bromley Motorsport | SIL; Ret | VAL; 8 | PAU | JER; 13 | PER | | | | | | | 18th | 2 |
| 1989 | Leyton House Racing | | | | | | BRH; 5 | BIR; DNQ | SPA; 11 | BUG; Ret | DIJ; Ret | | 18th | 2 |
| 1990 | Middlebridge Racing | DON | SIL; Ret | PAU; DNQ | JER; 12 | MNZ; 3 | PER; 3 | HOC; 14† | BRH; 8 | BIR; DNQ | BUG; 8 | NOG; 11 | 11th | 8 |

=== Complete Formula One results ===
(key)

| Year | Entrant | Chassis | Engine | 1 | 2 | 3 | 4 | 5 | 6 | 7 | 8 | 9 | 10 | 11 | 12 | 13 | 14 | 15 | 16 | WDC | Points |
|---|---|---|---|---|---|---|---|---|---|---|---|---|---|---|---|---|---|---|---|---|---|
| 1990 | Life Racing Engines | Life L190 | Life W12 | USA; DNPQ | BRA; DNPQ | SMR | MON | CAN | MEX | FRA | GBR | GER | HUN | BEL | ITA | POR | ESP | JPN | AUS | NC | 0 |

=== Complete Australian Endurance Championship results ===
(key) (Races in bold indicate pole position) (Races in italics indicate fastest lap)

| Year | Team | Car | 1 | 2 | 3 | DC | Points |
|---|---|---|---|---|---|---|---|
| 1990 | Benson & Hedges Racing | Ford Sierra RS500 | SAN | BAT | ECK; 4 | 17th | 10 |
| 1991 | Allan Moffat Enterprises | Ford Sierra RS500 | SAN | BAT; Ret | | NC | 0 |

=== Complete 24 Hours of Le Mans results ===
| Year | Class | No | Tyres | Car | Team | Co-drivers | Laps | Pos. | Class pos. |
|---|---|---|---|---|---|---|---|---|---|
| 1989 | C1 | 55 | **D** | Porsche 962C; Porsche Type-935 3.0L Turbo Flat-6 | (Australia) Team Schuppan | (Australia) Vern Schuppan (Sweden) Eje Elgh | 321 | 13th | 10th |

=== Complete 24 Hours of Daytona results ===
| Year | Class | No | Tyres | Car | Team | Co-drivers | Laps | Pos. | Class pos. |
|---|---|---|---|---|---|---|---|---|---|
| 1992 | GTP | 84 | **G** | Nissan R90CK; Nissan V8/90° 4v 3.0L Turbo | (United States) Nissan Performance Technology Inc. | (Republic of Ireland) Derek Daly (New Zealand) Steve Millen | 150 | DNF | |

=== Complete 12 Hours of Sebring results ===
| Year | Class | No | Tyres | Car | Team | Co-drivers | Laps | Pos. | Class pos. |
|---|---|---|---|---|---|---|---|---|---|
| 1991 | GTP | 83 | **G** | Nissan NPT-90; Nissan V6 3.0L 2x Garrett Turbo | (United States) Nissan Performance Technology Inc. | (Australia) Geoff Brabham (Republic of Ireland) Derek Daly | 298 | **1st** | |
| 1992 | GTP | 1 | **G** | Nissan NPT-91A; Nissan V6 3.0L 2x Garrett Turbo | (United States) Nissan Performance Technology Inc. | (Netherlands) Arie Luyendyk | 20 | DNF | |
| 1992 | GTP | 83 | **G** | Nissan NPT-91A; Nissan V6 3.0L 2x Garrett Turbo | (United States) Nissan Performance Technology Inc. | (Australia) Geoff Brabham (Republic of Ireland) Derek Daly (Netherlands) Arie Luyendyk | 355 | **2nd** | |

=== Complete Bathurst 1000 results ===
| Year | Team | Co-drivers | Car | Class | Laps | Pos. | Class pos. |
|---|---|---|---|---|---|---|---|
| 1987 | (Italy) BMW Motorsport | (Argentina) Juan Manuel Fangio II | BMW M3 | 2 | 146 | 16th | 6th |
| 1991 | (Australia) Allan Moffat Enterprises | (New Zealand) Steve Millen | Ford Sierra RS500 | 1 | 128 | DNF | DNF |
| 1992 | (Australia) Allan Moffat Enterprises | (Australia) Charlie O'Brien | Ford Sierra RS500 | 1 | 124 | 25th | 20th |

=== American Open Wheel racing results ===
(key)

==== CART ====
| Year | Team | No. | 1 | 2 | 3 | 4 | 5 | 6 | 7 | 8 | 9 | 10 | 11 | 12 | 13 | 14 | 15 | 16 | Rank | Points | Ref |
|---|---|---|---|---|---|---|---|---|---|---|---|---|---|---|---|---|---|---|---|---|---|
| 1993 | Dick Simon Racing | 90 | SRF; 14 | PHX | LBH | INDY | MIL | DET | POR | CLE | TOR | MIS | NHM | ROA | VAN | MDO | NZR | LS | **40th** | **0** | |
| 1994 | Bettenhausen Racing | 76 | SRF; 24 | PHX | LBH | INDY | MIL | DET | POR | CLE | TOR | MIS | MDO | NHM | VAN | ROA | NZR | LS | **52nd** | **0** | |

Sporting positions
| Preceded by None | British Formula 3000 champion 1989 | Succeeded by Pedro Chaves |
