= Ross Hockenhull =

British former racing driver (born 1961)

- Nationality: (United Kingdom) British
- Full name: Ross Edwin Hockenhull
- Born: September 29, 1961 (age 65) Buxton, Derbyshire

Previous series
- 1991; 1990; 1989; 1985-1988; 1984-1985: Barber Pro Series; British Formula 3; International Formula 3000; British Formula 3; Formula Ford

Ross Edwin Hockenhull (born 29 September 1961) is a British former racing driver.

== Career ==
Hockenhull began his racing career in Formula Ford, competing in the 1600 series in 1984 winning the final round of the season at Thruxton. Hockenhull progressed into the 2000 series the following year, and won the opening round of the BBC Grandstand Formula Ford Festival at Brands Hatch.

Hockenhull raced extensively in the British Formula 3 Championship, initially from 1985 until 1988 and again for one round in 1990. From 1986 until 1988, Hockenhull competed in a Ralt F3 car with Volkswagen power for Richard Dutton Racing and Bowman Racing. In 1988, Hockenhull had his best season with a 6th placed championship finish in a season that included two season place finishes behind JJ Lehto at Silverstone and Spa. Hockenhull would also compete in the 1988 Macau Grand Prix finishing in 12th position behind future Ferrari F1 driver Jean Alesi.

In 1989, Hockenhull joined Cobra Motorsport for three races of the International Formula 3000 season. He retired from his first race due to transmission failure, before finishing eighth in the next round at Brands Hatch. His final International Formula 3000 race came at the Birmingham Superprix.

== Career summary ==
Season	Series	Team	Races	Wins	Poles	F/Laps	Podiums	Points	Position
1985	British Formula 3 - National Class	Richard Dutton Racing	3	1	2	2	3	23	8th
1986	British Formula 3	Richard Dutton Racing	18	0	0	0	0	5	17th
1987	British Formula 3	Richard Dutton Racing	17	0	0	1	0	3	14th
1988	British Formula 3	Bowman Racing	18	0	2	0	0	22	6th
1988	Scottish Superprix	Bowman Racing	1	0	0	0	1	1	2nd
1988	Cellnet Superprix	Bowman Racing	1	0	0	0	0	DNF	NC
1988	Macau Grand Prix	Bowman Racing	1	0	0	0	0	0	12th
1989	International Formula 3000	Cobra Motorsport	3	0	0	0	0	0	NC
1990	British Formula 3	Hepworth Racing	1	0	0	0	0	0	NC
1991	Barber Saab Pro Series		12	0	0	0	0	50	7th
