= Martin Donnelly (racing driver) =

British racing driver (born 1964)

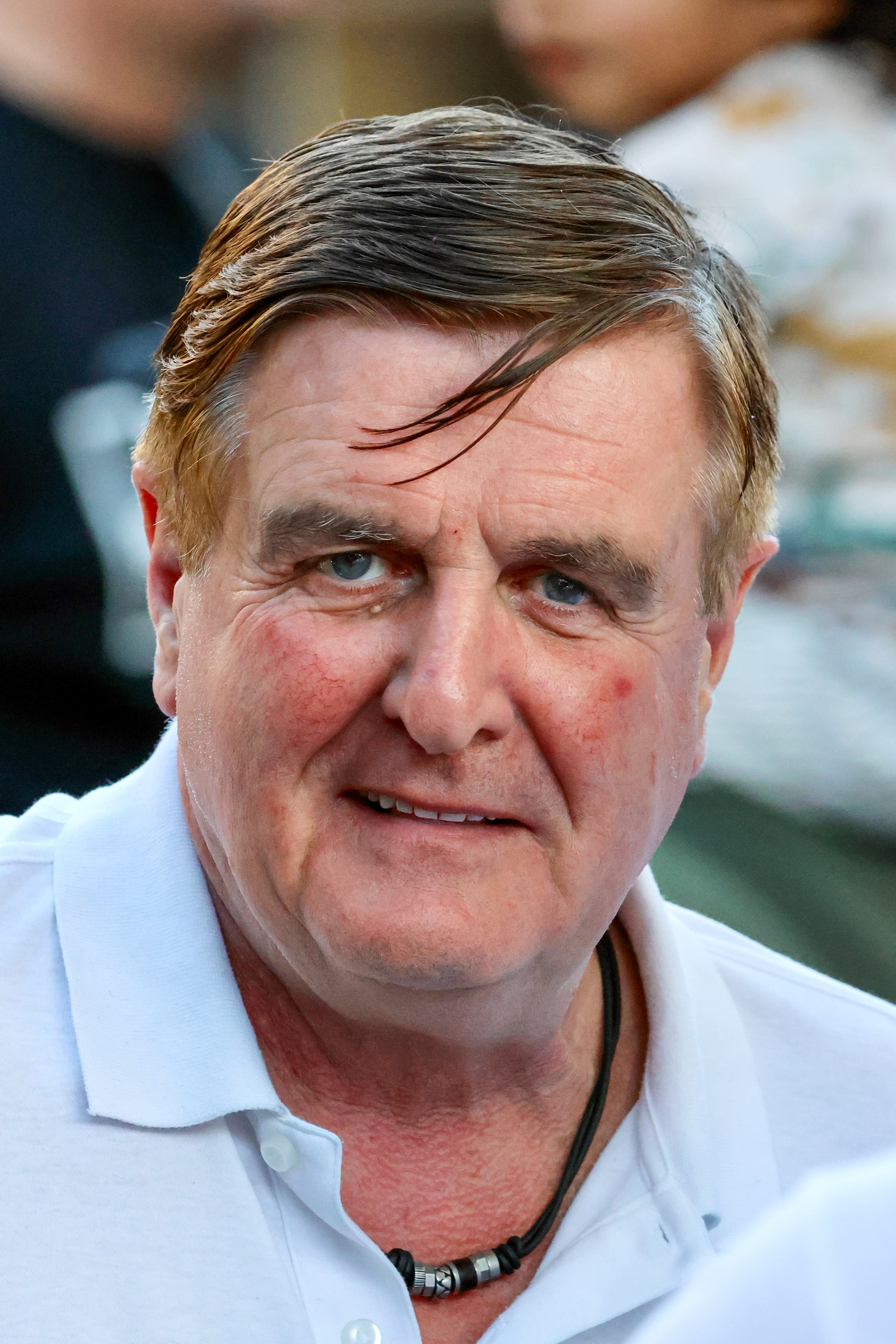
- Donnelly at the 2026 Adelaide Motorsport Festival
- Born: Hugh Peter Martin Donnelly; 26 March 1964 (age 62); Belfast, Northern Ireland
- Spouse: Diane McWhirter (m. 1991)
- Children: 3

Formula One World Championship career
- Nationality: (United Kingdom) British
- Active years: 1989–1990
- Team(s): Arrows, Lotus
- Entries: 15 (13 starts)
- Championships: 0
- Wins: 0
- Podiums: 0
- Career points: 0
- Pole positions: 0
- Fastest laps: 0
- First entry: 1989 French Grand Prix
- Last entry: 1990 Spanish Grand Prix

Previous series
- 2015; 1988–1989; 1988; 1983–1988 (Note: The exact years Donnelly competed in British F3: 1983, 1986–1988.); 1983–1985: BTCC; International F3000; World Sportscar; British F3; British FFord

Championship titles
- 1987: Macau Grand Prix

Hugh Peter Martin Donnelly (/ˈdɒnəli/; born 26 March 1964) is a British former racing driver from Northern Ireland who competed in Formula One at 15 Grands Prix from 1989 and 1990.

Donnelly competed in Formula Three and International Formula 3000, where he won three races, including the 1987 Macau Grand Prix. In 1988, he placed third in International F3000 after only competing in the final five rounds. He raced in Formula One in 1989 and 1990 for Arrows and Lotus, until a serious crash during practice at the latter Spanish Grand Prix ended his Formula One career.

After leaving Formula One, Donnelly has become a driving coach and retains a close association with Lotus Cars. He returned to professional racing in 2015, competing at Thruxton in the British Touring Car Championship. His career inspired the backstory of Sonny Hayes in F1 (2025).

== Racing career ==
=== Formula One ===
During 1988, as well as his racing commitments, Donnelly was the test driver for Lotus Formula One team. But it was during 1989 that Donnelly got his first race start when he substituted for Arrows driver Derek Warwick at the 1989 French Grand Prix after Warwick injured his back in a non-competitive karting accident. He impressed in France qualifying 14th compared to his much more experienced teammate Eddie Cheever who started 25th on the grid. Donnelly finished his first F1 race three laps down in 12th place and was the last car running to finish while Cheever's experience told and he had a better race finishing only one lap down in seventh place.

In 1990, Donnelly continued in F1 with Lotus though this time not as a test driver but as a race driver alongside new teammate Derek Warwick. However, it was a frustrating season of scoring no points driving the V12 powered Lotus-Lamborghini which often saw him retire with engine failure. Donnelly's performance in the Lotus drew interest from several more competitive teams, prompting Lotus to renegotiate his contract for 5.6 million pounds, to prevent him from being bought out.

==== Jerez accident ====
At the 1990 Spanish Grand Prix held at the Jerez circuit, Donnelly suffered a serious crash caused by suspension failure during practice, with his Lotus hitting the wall at an estimated speed of 160 mph (260 km/h). This caused his car to break apart and the safety cell to split open, which ejected Donnelly from the wreckage. Donnelly was sent across the live track as cars were still racing around it. He sustained multiple injuries, including brain and lung contusions as well as severe leg fractures, the latter of which almost necessitated the amputation of his right leg. Sid Watkins and medics rushed to the scene to save Donnelly's life on the race track, and he was airlifted to hospital. Watkins applied his skills upon arrival as it is reported Donnelly had swallowed his tongue on impact and was struggling to breathe. His friend Ayrton Senna watched on in horror and with concern for Donnelly. His condition was critical, and he was placed in a medically induced coma as his organs started to fail, with his heart stopping twice. His injuries were so severe that he was read the last rites by a priest. With extensive physiotherapy and further surgeries to his badly damaged leg, Donnelly was able to walk again.

In 1993, Donnelly had a brief test with Jordan, but due to the severity of his injuries and self-doubt due to the horrific nature of his crash, his Formula One career was over.

Footage from the crash was used in the 2025 film F1 as a major plot point.

=== After Formula One ===
In 1992, Donnelly returned to racing in rallycross, competing in the Vauxhall Nova Challenge.

In 1995, Donnelly scored a single win in the short-lived Formula Classic series.

Donnelly has since raced in smaller club events, and owned a Formula Vauxhall and Formula Three team, Martin Donnelly Racing. In 2004, Donnelly raced a Mazda RX-8 in a Silverstone 24-Hour race, finishing in 27th place. 2006 saw Donnelly return to Lotus, participating in a track day sponsored by a Lotus owner's club. In September 2007, Donnelly beat 35 other Lotus Elises to win Class A in the Donington Park round of the Elise Trophy. This class win was closely followed by the race win in the 2nd Elise Trophy race of the day. Later in the season he raced at Spa-Francorchamps and in 2008, campaigned in a Lotus 2-Eleven. Donnelly continues to have a close relationship with Elise Trophy organisers LoTRDC, racing in a Lotus Evora in 2012 and he is currently working as a club steward for Lotus Cup Europe. In 2017 Donnelly raced in the FIA Lotus Cup Europe in a Motul sponsored Lotus Elise.

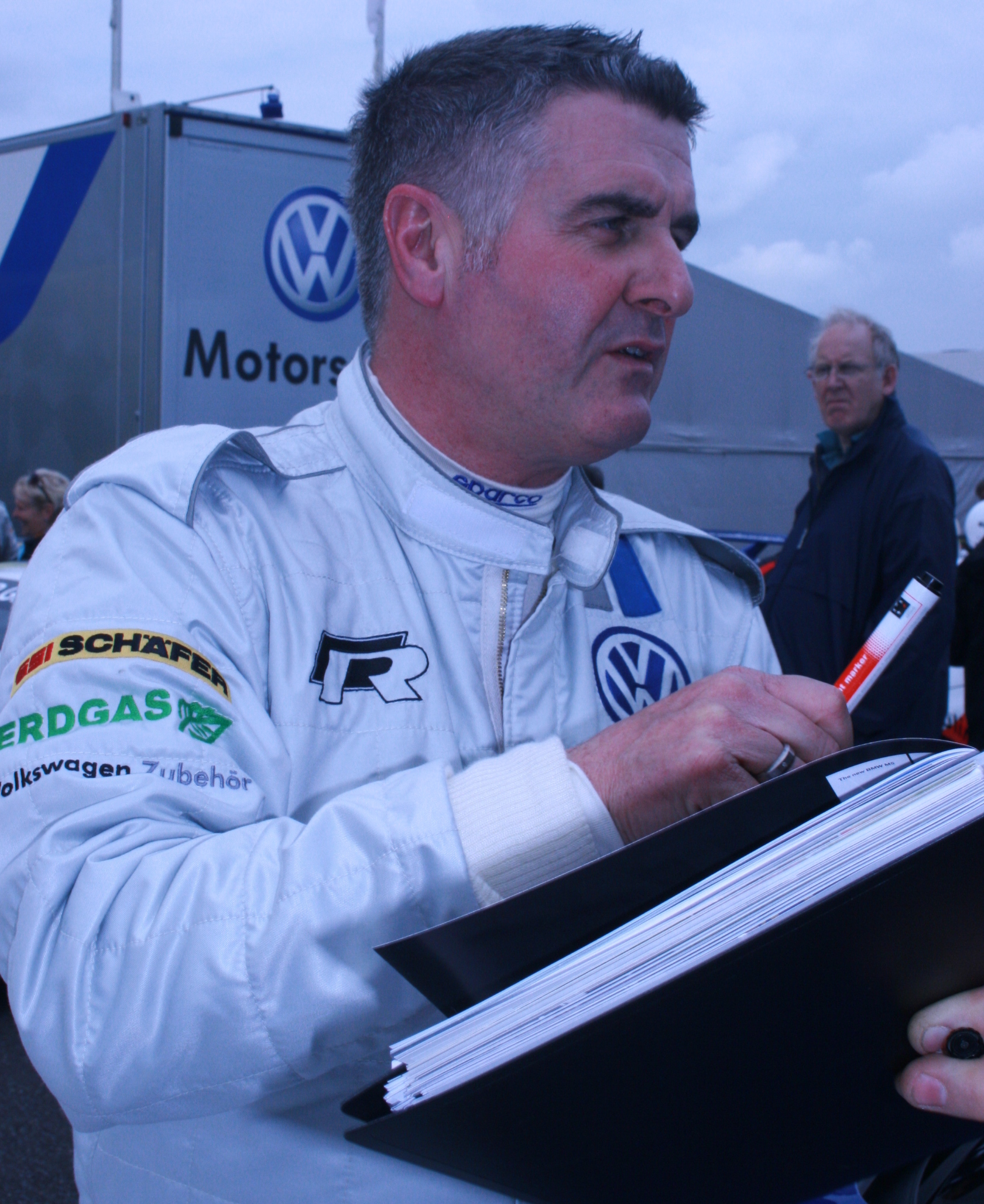
Donnelly in 2012

Donnelly worked as a driver development director for Comtec Racing in 2008. By 2009, Donnelly was no longer associated with Comtec Racing. In June 2010, Donnelly drove as a guest in the Ginetta G50 Cup at Oulton Park. On 2 July 2011 at the Goodwood Festival of Speed, Donnelly drove a Lotus 102 similar to that which nearly took his life. The Lamborghini-powered car was the same specification as the car he drove in 1990, the original car having been completely destroyed in the crash. He has been appointed as the driver representative on the FIA stewards panel for a number of F1 Grand Prix including most recently the 2012 and 2013 Canadian Grand Prix.

Having worked as sporting director and driver development manager at Comtec Racing, Donnelly has recently formed the Donnelly track academy specialising in Lotus trackday events and racing services in Norfolk.

Donnelly made his British Touring Car Championship début in 2015, briefly driving for the works Infiniti-Support Our Paras Racing team, but the team's plans were thrown into disarray by the marque's subsequent withdrawal of its backing from the project, and he was replaced by Max Coates.

In 2019, Donnelly crashed his moped while participating in a charity rally, rebreaking his femur and subsequently suffering from sepsis. As he was unable to work due to his injuries, a successful fundraiser was held, drawing donations from numerous members of the racing community.

== Racing record ==
=== Career summary ===
Season	Series	Team	Races	Wins	Poles	F/Laps	Podiums	Points	Position
1983	British Formula Three	Eddie Jordan Racing	1	0	0	0	0	0	NC
1986	British Formula Three	Swallow Racing	17	4	1	0	7	59	**3rd**
1986	Macau Grand Prix	Swallow Racing	1	0	0	0	0	N/A	DNF
1987	British Formula Three	Swallow Racing/Intersport Racing	18	2	2	1	8	61	**3rd**
1987	Macau Grand Prix	Intersport Engineering w/ Mr Juicy	1	1	1	0	1	N/A	**1st**
1988	British Formula Three	Cellnet Ricoh Racing/Intersport Team	12	3	4	2	7	54	4th
1988	International Formula 3000 Championship	Eddie Jordan Racing	5	2	0	2	4	30	**3rd**
1988	World Sportscar Championship	Richard Lloyd Racing / SARD	3	0	0	0	0	8	59th
1989	International Formula 3000 Championship	Eddie Jordan Racing	10	1	1	1	2	13	8th
1989	Japanese Formula 3000 Championship	Team Kygnus Tonen	3	0	0	0	0	0	NC
1989	Supercup	Nismo	1	1	0	1	1	12	8th
1989	All Japan Sports Prototype Car Endurance Championship	Takefuji Racing Team	1	0	0	0	0	6	29th
1989	Formula One	Arrows Grand Prix International	1	0	0	0	0	0	NC
1989	24 Hours of Le Mans	Nismo	1	0	0	0	0	0	DNF
1990	Formula One	Camel Team Lotus	12	0	0	0	0	0	NC
1990	24 Hours of Le Mans	Nismo	1	0	0	0	0	N/A	DNF
2015	British Touring Car Championship	Infiniti Support Our Paras Racing	3	0	0	0	0	0	35th

=== Complete International Formula 3000 results ===
(key) (Races in bold indicate pole position; races in italics indicate fastest lap)

Year	Entrant	1	2	3	4	5	6	7	8	9	10	11	DC	Points
1988	Jordan Racing	JER	VAL	PAU	SIL	MNZ	PER	BRH; 1	BIR; 2	BUG; 2	**ZOL**; Ret	DIJ; 1	**3rd**	**30**
1989	Jordan Racing	SIL; Ret	**VAL**; DSQ	PAU; Ret	JER; Ret	PER; Ret	BRH; 1	BIR; 3	SPA; Ret	BUG; 7	DIJ; 17		8th	13

=== Complete Japanese Formula 3000 results ===
(key)

Year	Entrant	1	2	3	4	5	6	7	8	DC	Points
1989	Team Kygnus Tonen	SUZ	FUJ	MIN	SUZ; 9	SUG; 7	FUJ; Ret	SUZ	SUZ	NC	0

=== Complete Formula One results ===
(key)

Year	Entrant	Chassis	Engine	1	2	3	4	5	6	7	8	9	10	11	12	13	14	15	16	WDC	Pts.
1989	Arrows Grand Prix International	Arrows A11	Ford V8	BRA	SMR	MON	MEX	USA	CAN	FRA; 12	GBR	GER	HUN	BEL	ITA	POR	ESP	JPN	AUS	NC	0
1990	Camel Team Lotus	Lotus 102	Lamborghini V12	USA; DNS	BRA; Ret	SMR; 8	MON; Ret	CAN; Ret	MEX; 8	FRA; 12	GBR; Ret	GER; Ret	HUN; 7	BEL; 12	ITA; Ret	POR; Ret	ESP; DNS	JPN	AUS	NC	0

=== Complete British Touring Car Championship results ===
(key) (Races in bold indicate pole position – 1 point awarded in first race; races in italics indicate fastest lap – 1 point awarded all races; * signifies that driver lead race for at least one lap – 1 point awarded all races)

Year	Team	Car	1	2	3	4	5	6	7	8	9	10	11	12	13	14	15	16	17	18	19	20	21	22	23	24	25	26	27	28	29	30	Pos	Points
2015	Infiniti Support Our Paras Racing	Infiniti Q50	BRH; 1	BRH; 2	BRH; 3	DON; 1	DON; 2	DON; 3	THR; 1; 20	THR; 2; 19	THR; 3 Ret	OUL; 1	OUL; 2	OUL; 3	CRO; 1	CRO; 2	CRO; 3	SNE; 1	SNE; 2	SNE; 3	KNO; 1	KNO; 2	KNO; 3	ROC; 1	ROC; 2	ROC; 3	SIL; 1	SIL; 2	SIL; 3	BRH; 1	BRH; 2	BRH; 3	35th	0

== Notes ==
Sporting positions
Preceded by Andy Wallace	Macau Grand Prix; Winner; 1987	Succeeded by Enrico Bertaggia
