= Phil Andrews (racing driver) =

British racing driver (born 1966)

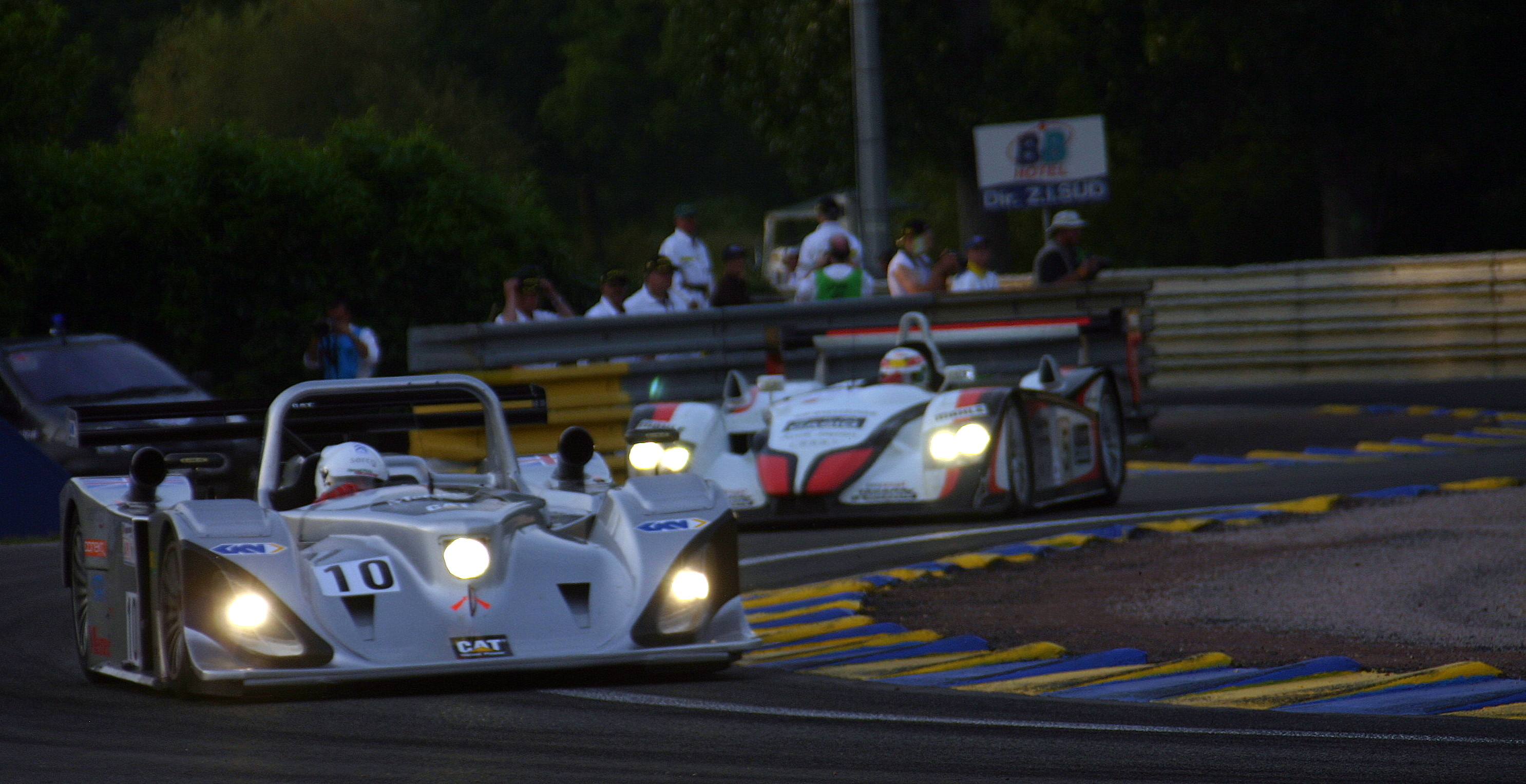
- Andrews leading an Audi R8 LMP1 in 2004.
- Nationality: (United Kingdom) British
- Born: 20 December 1966 (age 59) Walsall, England
- Relatives: David Andrews (father)

Philip David Andrews (born 20 December 1966) is a British former racing driver from Birmingham.

Andrews began his professional career in Formula Ford then raced in the British Formula Three Championship in 1987 where he finished 18th. He returned for a full season in 1988 but failed to score points. In 1989, he raced in International Formula 3000 for Middlebridge and failed to score in nine starts. He returned to the series in 1990 with Superpower Engineering but again failed to score in eight starts. In 1991, he raced in British Formula 3000 for Superpower and finished sixth in points. He returned to International F3000 in 1992 with Vortex and again failed to register points in nine starts. He raced part-time in both International F3000 and British F2 (formerly British F3000) in 1993. He was the runner up in the 1994 British F2 season and drove in his first 24 Hours of Le Mans for ADA Engineering. He made sporadic sports car appearances in 1995 and 1996 and was away from racing until 2000, when he raced in the National Saloon Cup and finished seventh in a Ford Focus.

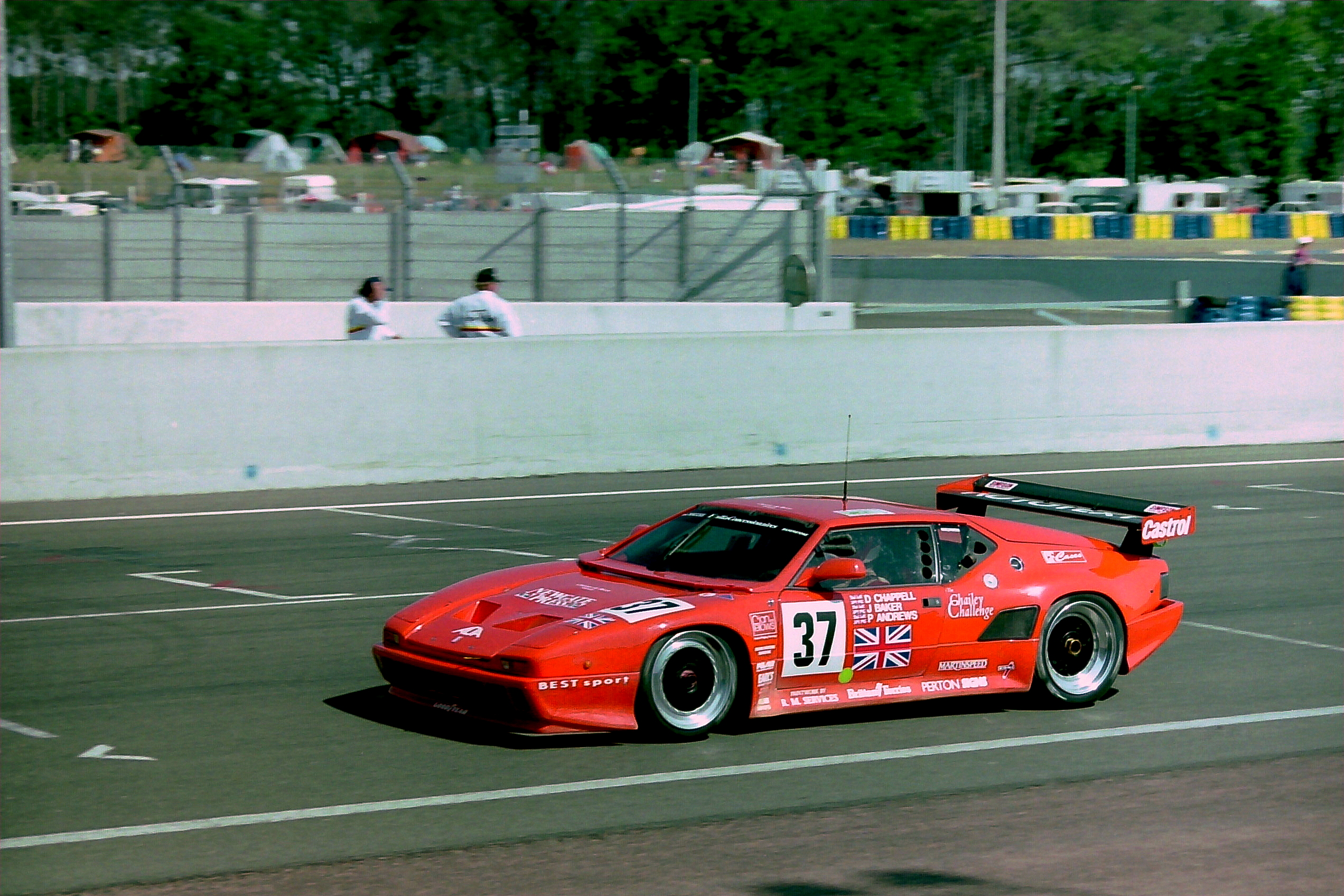
Andrews' De Tomaso Pantera GT1 at the 1994 24 Hours of Le Mans.

Andrews signed to drive a Ford Focus for GR Motorsport in the Production Class in the 2001 British Touring Car Championship but never raced despite being on the official entry list.

In 2002, Andrews raced in EuroBOSS driving a Benetton and finished third in the championship. He made assorted sports car starts for Taurus Sports Racing in 2003 and 2004, including his first American Le Mans Series appearance. In 2006, he competed in Ferrari Challenge Europe, which would be his last racing appearance.

== Complete 24 Hours of Le Mans results ==
Year	Team	Co-Drivers	Car	Class	Laps	Pos.	Class Pos.
1994	(United Kingdom) A.D.A. Engineering Ltd.	(United Kingdom) Dominic Chappell (United Kingdom) Jonathan Baker	De Tomaso Pantera 200	GT1	210	NC	NC
2004	(United Kingdom) Taurus Sports Racing	(United Kingdom) Calum Lockie (Belgium) Anthony Kumpen	Lola B2K/10-Caterpillar	LMP1	35	DNF	DNF
