= Philippe Favre =

Swiss racing driver

- Nationality: Swiss
- Born: December 11, 1961 Geneva, Switzerland
- Died: December 6, 2013 (aged 51) Val Thorens, France

Previous series
- 2006 2004-2005 2003 1997-2001 2000 2000 1998-1999 1997 1992-1993 1989-1990 1987-1988 1984: Ferrari Challenge Europe; Le Mans Endurance Series; FIA Sportscar Championship; French GT Championship; GrandAM; FIA GT; Belgian Procar; BPR International Endurance; Indy Lights; Formula 3000; British F3; Formula Ford France

Philippe Favre (11 December 1961 − 6 December 2013) was a Swiss racing driver who notably competed in Formula 3000 and twice at the 24 Hours of Le Mans.

== Racing career ==
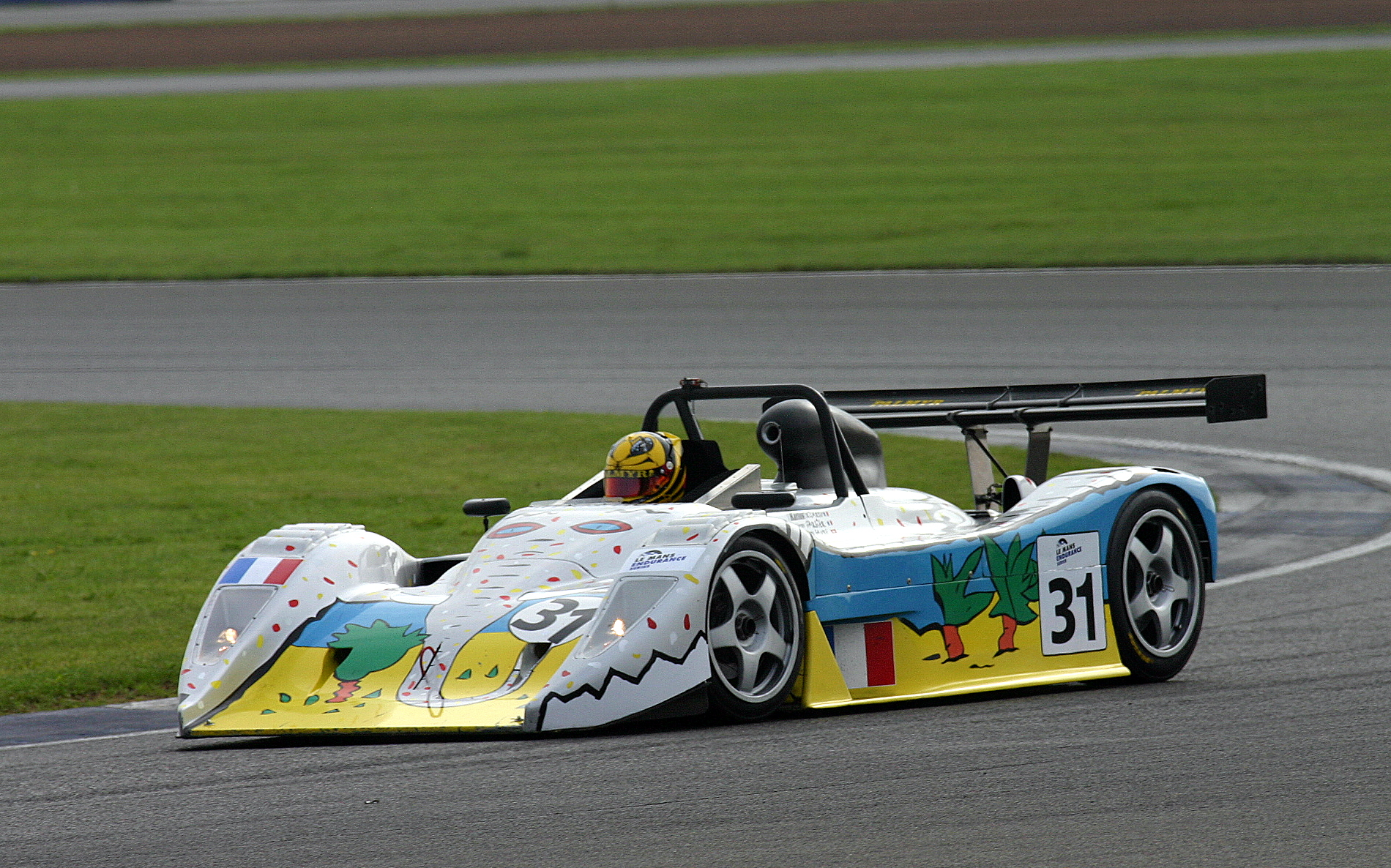
Lucchini SR2000 - Philippe Favre, Christophe Ricard & Gregory Fargier at Luffield at the 2004 Silverstone 1000 km.

Born in Geneva in 1961, Favre began racing in France in the early 1980s, driving Formula Ford before competing at the 1986 Festival, where he narrowly missed victory to future F1 driver Roland Ratzenberger. Remaining in the UK, Favre joined Reynard to compete in the 1987 British F3 series, winning once at Donington Park. Following another season in Britain, Favre joined GA Motorsport for the 1989 Formula 3000 series. He finished 13th with six points scoring one podium. He moved to Leyton House Racing for the start of the 1990 season, narrowly missing a Formula One seat with the team. He would switch to the All-Japan F3000 series for three races before a hiatus from competition in 1991.

For 1992, Favre headed to the United States competing in Indy Lights, before joining Kremer Racing to compete in the 1994 24 Hours of Le Mans driving a Honda NSX. The team finished 7th in their class. Favre returned in 1995, before switching to GT and Sportscar racing starting with the 1996 BPR International Endurance GT Series competing in a Venturi. He would continue competing in the French GT Series racing a Porsche 911 GT2 alongside guest appearances in other European championships. In 2000, Favre competed in the British GT championship with Lister and finished in 11th place. Favre would return to competing in Porsche's across a number of series, before in 2003 joining the FIA Sportscar Championship driving a Lucchini SR2000 alongside Christophe Ricard.

Favre's last full season of racing came in 2006, in the Ferrari Challenge Europe with Kessel Racing finishing in ninth place overall.

== Outside racing ==
In 2002, Favre began working with Exclusive Events, an organizer of motorsport events. This experience, and success as a motorsport coach, led him to found his own events company - Philippe Favre Events S.A. based in Geneva. The organization worked in partnership with the Touring Club Suisse and L'Automobile Club de Suisse, and hired racing drivers including Alex Caffi, Marc Benz and Andrea Chiesa to be part of its events. Favre coached a number of drivers, including Henri Moser.

== Death ==
Favre was killed in a skiing accident at Val Thorens in France five days before his 52nd birthday on 6 December 2013. Countryman Mathias Beche auctioned his 2014 Le Mans 24h winning trophy, donating proceeds to Favre's family.
