= John Alcorn (racing driver) =

British race car driver (born 1964)

- Nationality: (United Kingdom) British
- Born: July 27, 1964 (age 62) Romford, Essex

Previous series
- 1988-89; 1987; 1986-87: British Formula 3; FIA Intercontinental Formula 3000; Formula Ford

John Alcorn (born 27 July 1964 in Romford, Essex) is a retired British race car driver.

== Career ==
Alcorn competed in the 1986 Formula Ford 2000 Europe series, ending the season in 4th place on 65 points. The championship was won by future Formula 1 driver, Mark Blundell. For 1987, Alcorn continued racing in Formula Ford in the European, Dutch and British series. He also attempted to qualify for two rounds of the 1987 International Formula 3000 season for Colin Bennett Racing at Le Mans and Jarama, failing on both occasions.

For 1988, Alcorn joined Middlebridge Racing in British F3, taking victory at the Brands Hatch round of the season. He moved to Pacific, and ultimately finished 7th in the championship. For 1989, he remained in British F3 but now racing for Becsport. Across the 13 race season, Alcorn scored three podium finishes.

== Racing record ==
=== Complete International Formula 3000 results ===
(key) (Races in bold indicate pole position) (Races in italics indicate fastest lap)

| Year | Entrant | Chassis | Engine | Tyres | 1 | 2 | 3 | 4 | 5 | 6 | 7 | 8 | 9 | 10 | 11 | DC | Points |
|---|---|---|---|---|---|---|---|---|---|---|---|---|---|---|---|---|---|
| 1987 | Colin Bennett Racing | March 87B | Ford Cosworth | A | SIL | VAL | SPA | PAU | DON | PER | BRH | BIR | IMO | BUG; DNQ | JAR; DNQ | NC | 0 |
