= Bowman Automotive =

Bowman Automotive is a former racecar constructor and current racing kart producer. Bowman produced cars for Formula Ford, Formula 3, USF2000 and other racing series.

== History ==
Steve Hollman built up experience building PRS Formula Ford cars with his brother Vic and designer Sergio Rinland. After working at Ralt in 1987, running Eddie Jordan Racing, Hollman formed his own racing team: Bowman Racing. The team fielded a Volkswagen powered Ralt RT32 for Gary Brabham in the 1988 British Formula Three season. Brabham won four races and was placed second in the championship standings. The second driver of the team, Ross Hockenhull, finished seventh in the championship standings. In 1989 Bowman Racing won the drivers' championship with David Brabham. 1990 was the last season Bowman Racing entered Ralt cars. Steve Robertson and Peter Kox finished third and fifth in the series standings.

For the 1991 season Steve Hollman built his first Bowman racing car, the BC1. The car was designed by Bruce Cary (BC). Robertson was again the lead driver for the team in the British Formula Three Championship. The team struggled with their alternatively designed car and an engine which was less competitive. Roberston won two races at Thruxton Circuit. For 1992 Bowman built the BC2. Two cars went to race in the French Formula Three Championship. Jean-Christophe Boullion won three races in the championship with the BC2. For 1993 the Bowman chassis were outclassed by Dallara in the French and Japanese Formula 3 championships. Near the end of the season the BC4 emerged. The BC4 was technically identical to the BC3. The aerodynamics were very similar to that of a Dallara of that era.

In 1998 Bowman entered the American USF2000 championship. Highcroft Racing entered the BC5 for Andy Lally, Jeff Shafer and Duncan Dayton. Lally was the most successful driver finishing fourth in the series standings. In the manufacturer's standings Bowman finished third, behind Van Diemen and Tatuus. In 1999 Bowman only appeared in the first and second rounds of the championship. In the second round, in the second race, Lally finished third but pulled out of the championship.

In the late 1990s Hollman entered Bowman Racing team in the National Saloon Car Championship building Peugeot 306 cars for the series. Dan Eaves finished fourth in the series in 1999 and 2000. The operation was taken over by Vic Lee.

Currently the company makes karts for indoor and outdoor competition.

== Racing cars ==
Year	Car	Engine	Class
1991	Bowman BC1	Volkswagen	Formula 3
1992	Bowman BC2	Volkswagen	Formula 3
1993	Bowman BC3	Volkswagen	Formula 3
1993	Bowman BC4	Volkswagen	Formula 3
1998	Bowman BC5	Ford	USF2000
