= 1989 British Formula Three Championship =

1989 British Formula 3 International Series

Seasons
- ← 1988 1990 →

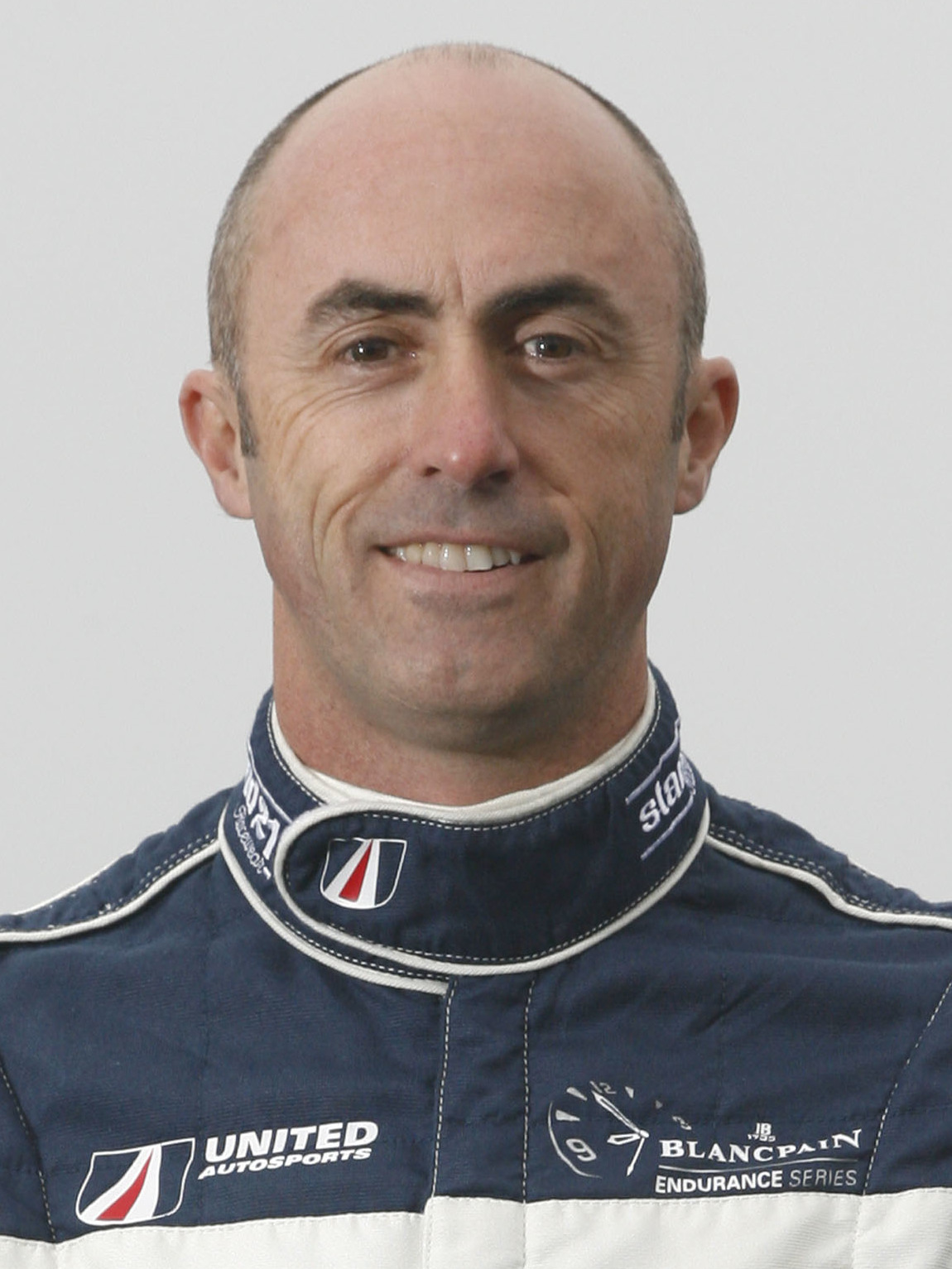
1989 champion, David Brabham

The 1989 British Formula Three season was the 39th season of the British Formula Three Championship, starting at Thruxton on 27 March and concluding there on 15 October after 16 races.

The title battle was largely fought between two sportscar racing stars of the future - West Surrey Racing's Allan McNish and Bowman Racing's David Brabham, both driving Ralt chassis. The former was initially declared champion at the end of the season as a result of Brabham being disqualified from his second-place finish the ninth round of the season at Silverstone and being penalised a further 18 points due to an irregularity with his Volkswagen engine. However, Brabham's points was reinstated following a court hearing in early 1990, giving him the title by a margin of 10 points over McNish.

Other notable drivers in the field included future BTCC champions Rickard Rydell (who would contest the championship again two years later) and Alain Menu, and future Formula One stars Mika Häkkinen and Mika Salo, who would go on to be the title protagonists in 1990.

1989 proved a high-water mark for the series in terms of entry numbers, which regularly exceeded 40 cars. The result of this was the creation of qualifying heats at certain rounds in order to slim the field down prior to the main race. It was also the first year for the Neil Brown Engineering-tuned Mugen-Honda engine, used by McNish among others, which would power all but one British F3 champion from 1990 to 2006. Class B was won by Fernando Plata in a year-old VW-powered Ralt.

The scoring system was 9-6-4-3-2-1 points awarded to the first six classified finishers, with one extra point added to the driver who set the fastest lap of the race. All results counted to the final tally.

== Race calendar and results ==
Round	Circuit	Date	Pole position	Fastest lap	Winning driver	Winning team	Class B winner
1	Thruxton	27 March	(Sweden) Rickard Rydell	(Switzerland) Alain Menu	(Sweden) Rickard Rydell	(Republic of Ireland) Eddie Jordan Racing	(United Kingdom) Eddie Kimbell
2	Silverstone	9 April	(Australia) David Brabham	(Switzerland) Alain Menu	(Australia) David Brabham	(United Kingdom) Bowman Racing	(New Zealand) Craig Simmiss
3^{1}	Brands Hatch	23 April	(Finland) Mika Häkkinen	(Finland) Mika Häkkinen	(Australia) David Brabham	(United Kingdom) Bowman Racing	(United Kingdom) Ken Bowes
4	Silverstone	1 May	(United Kingdom) Steve Robertson	(Republic of Ireland) Derek Higgins	(Republic of Ireland) Derek Higgins	(United Kingdom) West Surrey Racing	(Mexico) Fernando Plata
5	Brands Hatch	21 May	(Finland) Mika Häkkinen	(Germany) Otto Rensing	(Australia) David Brabham	(United Kingdom) Bowman Racing	(Mexico) Fernando Plata
6	Thruxton	29 May	(Republic of Ireland) Derek Higgins	(Republic of Ireland) Derek Higgins	(United Kingdom) Allan McNish	(United Kingdom) West Surrey Racing	(Mexico) Fernando Plata
7	Silverstone	4 June	(United Kingdom) Allan McNish	(Sweden) Rickard Rydell	(United Kingdom) Allan McNish	(United Kingdom) West Surrey Racing	(Mexico) Fernando Plata
8	Donington Park	2 July	(Sweden) Rickard Rydell	(United Kingdom) Allan McNish	(United Kingdom) Allan McNish	(United Kingdom) West Surrey Racing	(Australia) Warwick Rooklyn
9	Silverstone	15 July	(Australia) David Brabham	(Finland) Mika Häkkinen	(United Kingdom) Allan McNish	(United Kingdom) West Surrey Racing	(Mexico) Fernando Plata
10^{1}	Snetterton	6 August	(Australia) David Brabham	(Australia) David Brabham	(United Kingdom) Paul Stewart	(United Kingdom) Paul Stewart Racing	(Mexico) Fernando Plata
11	Oulton Park	13 August	(Australia) David Brabham	(Australia) David Brabham	(Australia) David Brabham	(United Kingdom) Bowman Racing	(Mexico) Fernando Plata
12	Silverstone	28 August	(Australia) David Brabham	(Republic of Ireland) Derek Higgins	(Australia) David Brabham	(United Kingdom) Bowman Racing	(Australia) Warwick Rooklyn
13	Brands Hatch	3 September	(Belgium) Philippe Adams	(United Kingdom) Allan McNish	(Belgium) Philippe Adams	(United Kingdom) Bowman Racing	(Australia) Warwick Rooklyn
14	Donington Park	17 September	(Australia) David Brabham	(United Kingdom) Steve Robertson	(United Kingdom) Steve Robertson	(United Kingdom) Bowman Racing	(United Kingdom) Scott Stringfellow
15	Silverstone	7 October	(United Kingdom) Allan McNish	(United Kingdom) Allan McNish	(Australia) David Brabham	(United Kingdom) Bowman Racing	(Australia) Warwick Rooklyn
16	Thruxton	15 October	(United Kingdom) Allan McNish	(Republic of Ireland) Derek Higgins	(United Kingdom) Allan McNish	(United Kingdom) West Surrey Racing	(Australia) Warwick Rooklyn

^1 These races were shortened due to accidents.

== Championship Standings ==
=== Class A ===
Pos.	Driver	Team	Points
1	(Australia) David Brabham	Bowman Racing	80
2	(United Kingdom) Allan McNish	West Surrey Racing	70
3	(Republic of Ireland) Derek Higgins	West Surrey Racing	46
4	(Sweden) Rickard Rydell	Eddie Jordan Racing	35
5	(United Kingdom) Steve Robertson	Bowman Racing	27
6	(Belgium) Philippe Adams	Bowman Racing	23
7	(Finland) Mika Häkkinen	Dragon Motorsport	18
8	(Switzerland) Alain Menu	Racefax Motorsport	16
9	(Germany) Otto Rensing	Paul Stewart Racing	15
10	(United Kingdom) Paul Stewart	Paul Stewart Racing	13
11	(United Kingdom) John Alcorn	Becsport	12
12	(United Kingdom) Gary Ayles	Jack Brabham Racing	11
13	(United Kingdom) Jason Elliott	Paul Stewart Racing; Swallow Racing	11
14	(Finland) Mika Salo	Alan Docking Racing	10
15	(Sweden) Niclas Schönström	Swallow Racing	9
16	(United Kingdom) Gary Ward	RGS Motorsport	6
17	(United Kingdom) Julian Westwood	Racefax Motorsport	5
18	(United Kingdom) Paul Warwick	Intersport	3
19	(Colombia) John Estupiñan	Bowman Racing	3
20	(Portugal) António Simões	Dawson Auto Developments	3

=== Class B ===
Pos.	Driver	Team	Points
1	(Mexico) Fernando Plata	Bowman Racing	89
2	(Australia) Warwick Rooklyn	Bowman Racing	68
3	(United Kingdom) Scott Stringfellow	Jim Lee Racing	68
4	(United Kingdom) Eddie Kimbell	Peter Lea Racing	32
5	(New Zealand) Craig Simmiss	CS Engineering	27
6	(United Kingdom) Stephen Hepworth	Driver	25
7	(United Kingdom) Ken Bowes	Hi-Tech Motor Sports Development	24
8	(United Kingdom) Chad Wentzel	Hubbard Racing	15
9	(Brazil) Lindoro da Silva	START Racing; Hi-Tech Motor Sports Development	10
10	(United Kingdom) Dominic Chappell	Long Ridge Racing	10
11	(United Kingdom) Charles Rickett	Jim Lee Racing	10
12	(Hong Kong) Darren Shaw	MacDonald Race Engineering	7
13	(Italy) Guido Basile	Terropol Promotions	6
14	(United Kingdom) Paul Smith	Tech-Speed Motorsport	5
15	(United Kingdom) Gary Thomas	CS Engineering	4
16	(United Kingdom) Rob Mears	Cram Motorsport	4
17	(United Kingdom) Chris Needham	Hi-Tech Motor Sport Developments	3
18	(Spain) Juan Serda	Roger Cowman Racing	2
19	(United Kingdom) Alan Tulloch	Peter Lea Racing	1
20	(United Kingdom) Chris Perkins	Royal Air Force MSA	1
