= Dominic Chappell =

British businessman and former racing driver

- Born: Dominic Joseph Andrew Chappell; November 28, 1966; Sunbury-on-Thames, Surrey, England
- Occupations: Businessman; former racing driver
- Known for: Acquisition and collapse of British Home Stores; multiple bankruptcies; tax evasion conviction
- Criminal charges: Tax evasion (2020)
- Criminal penalty: 6 years imprisonment

Dominic Joseph Andrew Chappell (born 28 November 1966) is a British businessman who has been declared bankrupt on three occasions and was convicted for tax evasion. In 2015, his company, Retail Acquisitions Ltd, purchased the now collapsed retail chain British Home Stores from Philip Green for just £1 GBP together with a £10,000,000 equity injection into BHS Group Ltd. 13 months later the company was placed into administration resulting in the closure of 164 stores and the loss of 11,000 jobs.

== Biography ==
Chappell was born in Sunbury-on-Thames, Surrey in 1966. He was educated at Millfield School in Somerset.

Chappell competed as a racing driver from 1986 to 1999, including races in British Formula Ford 2000, and British F3 in 1990, finishing runner-up in the Class B Championship and British Formula 3000. In 1993, Chappell and his British F2 team named Apache contested the final rounds of International Formula 3000 using the rights of team Cobra without scoring noteworthy results. Chappell competed in the 24 Hours of Le Mans race in the GT1 class in 1994 (not classified), 1995 (did not finish) and 1996 (did not finish), and entered in the GT2 class in 1997 but failed to qualify.

Chappell launched the Interactive Sportscar Championship in the UK in 2001. The series folded after one race, leaving almost everybody unpaid, despite promises of payment.

== Business career ==
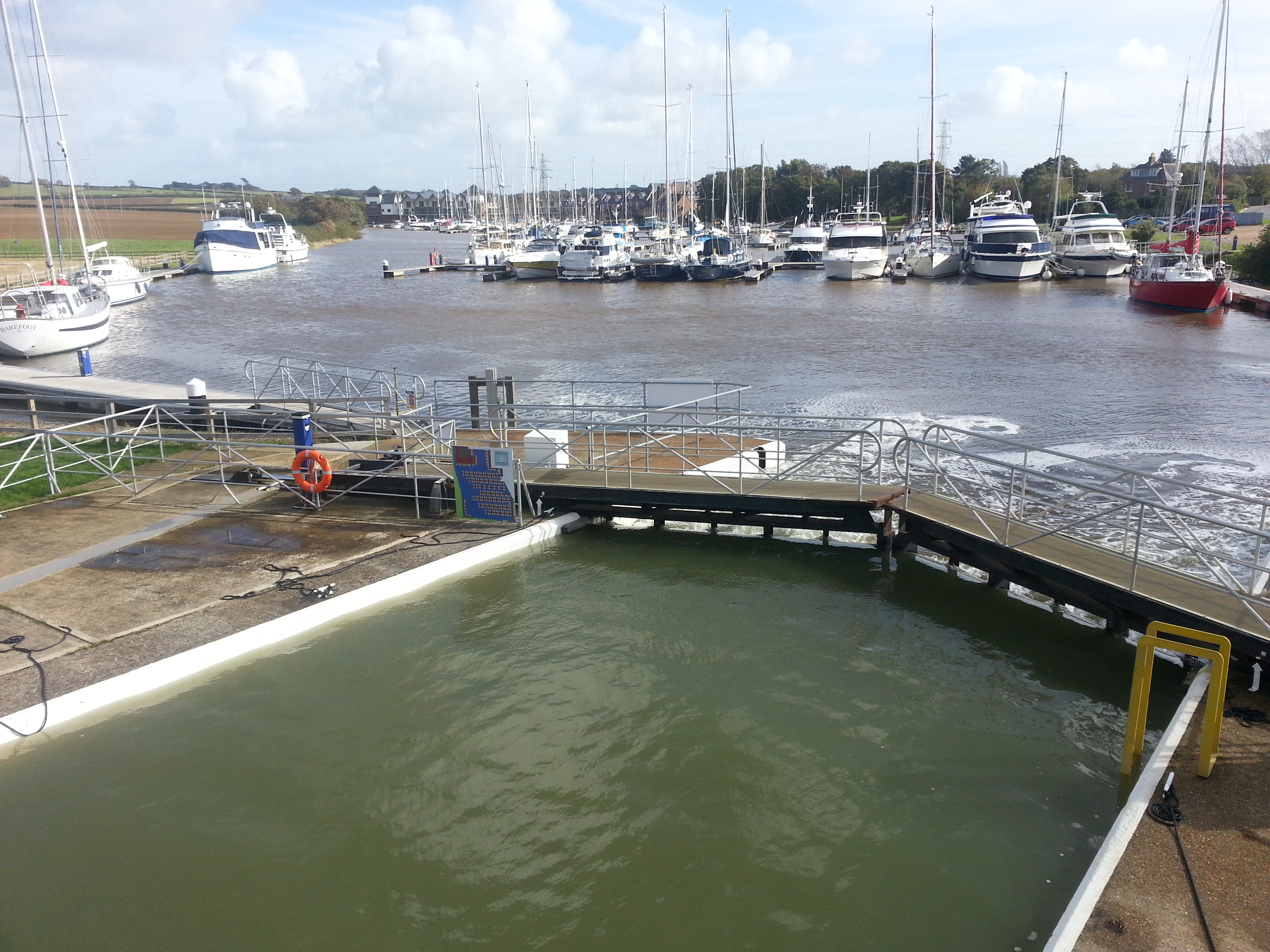
Island Harbour Marina

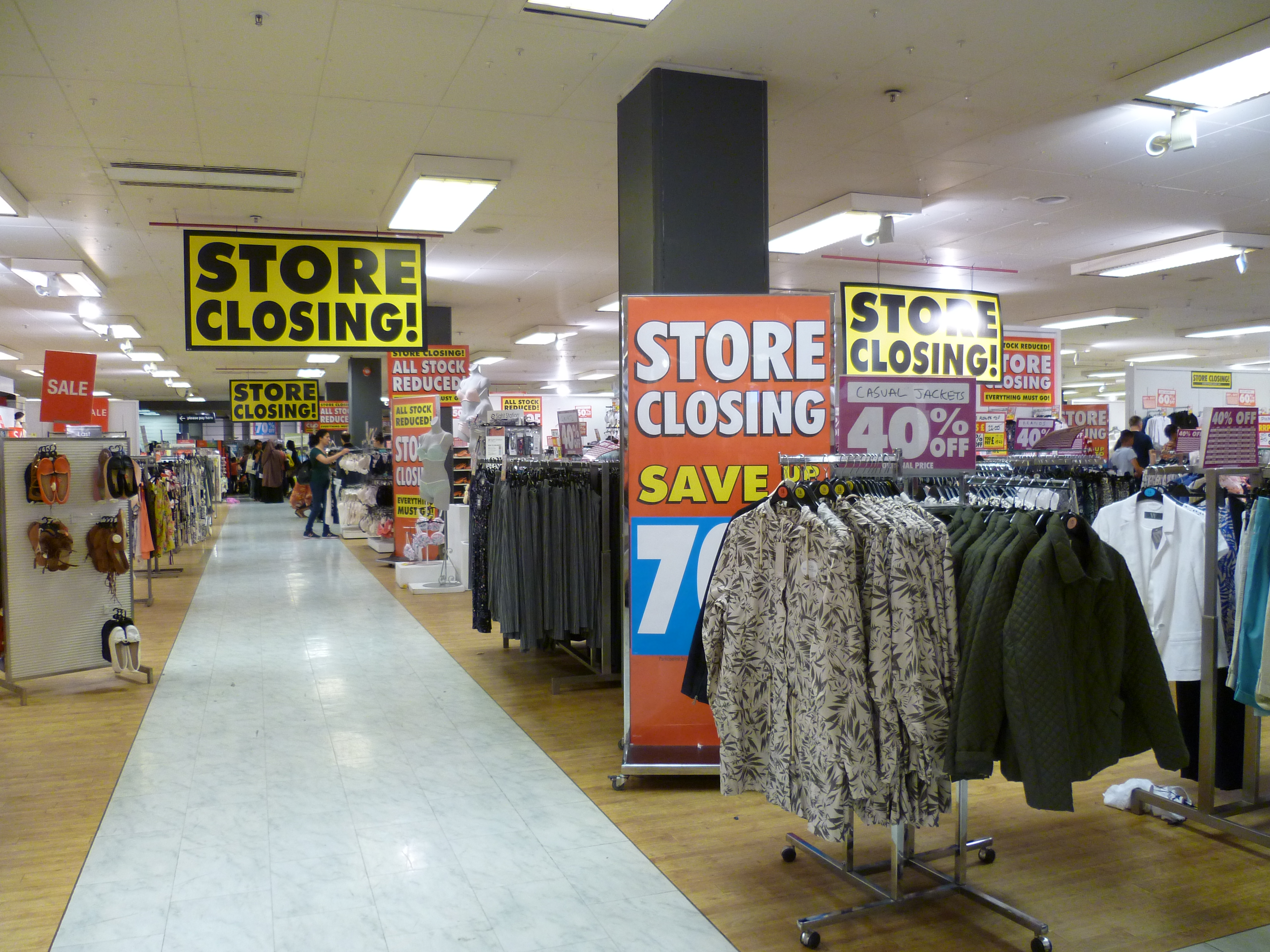
The closing-down sale for a British Home Stores branch in London.

Chappell has been a director of various failed companies, and has been made bankrupt three times and entered into an individual voluntary arrangement once.

He was a majority shareholder and hands on Director in the new housing at the Island Harbour Marina development on the Isle of Wight. His vision was for houses that would sell for up to £1m in 2008 but none have ever sold for more than £600k as of 2022.

It was reported in 2015 that Chappell, with the backing of investors, became the 90% owner of Retail Acquisitions, the firm that acquired British Home Stores (BHS) from Sir Philip Green for £1.

It subsequently transpired that instead of injecting new capital into the cash-strapped company as agreed with Arcadia, Chappell extracted £1,789,250 within three months of acquiring control of BHS.

During the 13-month period he controlled BHS, Chappell by his own admission, extracted a total of £2,627,643 from BHS.

On 26 April 2016, it was reported that when it became likely that BHS would be going into receivership, Chappell had moved £1.5 million from the firm to a company owned by a friend who was also a fellow board member of Retail Acquisitions. The sum had been later refunded at the request of BHS's chief executive Darren Topp (less £50,000 bank transaction fees).

Just days after putting BHS into liquidation, and with its £571m pension deficit absorbed by the UK government's Pension Protection Fund, Chappell was said to be considering re-purchasing some parts of the firm. Reporting on this development, the BBC's Business editor Simon Jack noted: "Sources at BHS treated the announcement with bewilderment. Other very senior retail sources used more colourful language. His credibility has taken a very serious knock. The details that have emerged about Dominic Chappell and his fellow directors' extraction of millions in professional fees has attracted widespread criticism".

On 2 September 2016, another Chappell-owned company, Swiss Rock plc, was put into liquidation. The Statement of Affairs included unpaid VAT debts of £365,000 and outstanding Corporation Tax of £197,306.

Retail Acquisitions Limited, the company used by Chappell to take over BHS in 2015, was wound up by the High Court of Justice on 3 May 2017 on the petition of BHS, owed £6.1M in respect of an unpaid loan. Chappell had previously disclosed that Retail Acquisitions Limited had paid £1.5M to settle a mortgage debt secured on his parents’ home.

Chappell was found guilty of three charges of neglecting or refusing to provide information and documents to The Pensions Regulator at Brighton Magistrates’ Court on 11 January 2018, and ordered to pay a fine of £50,000 and £37,000 court costs. Chappell said he could not pay because he had “no funds”, and claimed he had extensive outgoings, of almost £9,000 per month made up of: £3,800 a month rent on a Dorset mansion; £2,666 a month leasing a 2017-plate Range Rover; and £2,500 a month school fees for his two children, aged eight and 12, on which he was in arrears. In September 2018 he lost an appeal against his sentence.

In 2019 the UK Insolvency Service banned Chappell from company directorships for ten years following its investigation into the collapse of BHS under the Company Directors Disqualification Act 1986. Two other directors, one his father Joseph Chappell, were also banned for five years.

On 5 November 2020, Chappell was found guilty of failing to pay tax of around £584,000, and sentenced to six years in prison.

He was released from HMP Guys Marsh on 3 November 2023, having served half his sentence, as is normal in the UK.

He was returned to prison in March 2024, after breaching a number of his licence conditions while partnering with the chef Marco Pierre White and his son to set up three restaurants.

In June 2024, he was ordered to pay £50m to cover losses that the firm incurred before its collapse. A High Court judge said that Chappell had tried to "plunder the BHS Group whenever possible".

== See also ==
- Paul Alexander Sutton
