= Mika Salo =

Finnish racing driver (born 1966)

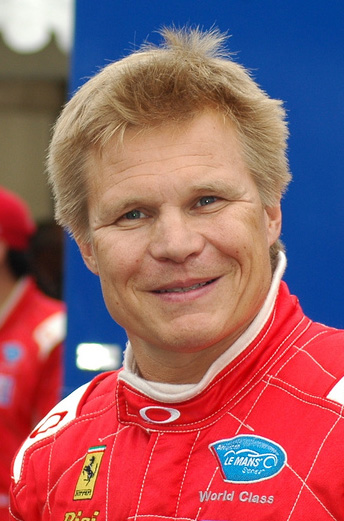
- Salo at the 2009 24 Hours of Le Mans
- Born: Mika Juhani Salo; 30 November 1966 (age 59); Helsinki, Uusimaa, Finland
- Spouses: Noriko Endo (m. 1999; div. 2022); Annica Lindblom (m. 2023)
- Children: 2
- Relatives: Jesse Krohn (godson)

Formula One World Championship career
- Nationality: (Finland) Finnish
- Active years: 1994–2000, 2002
- Team(s): Lotus, Tyrrell, Arrows, BAR, Ferrari, Sauber, Toyota
- Entries: 111 (109 starts)
- Championships: 0
- Wins: 0
- Podiums: 2
- Career points: 33
- Pole positions: 0
- Fastest laps: 0
- First entry: 1994 Japanese Grand Prix
- Last entry: 2002 Japanese Grand Prix

24 Hours of Le Mans career
- Years: 2003, 2007–2010, 2014
- Teams: Audi, Risi, AF Corse, SMP
- Best finish: 18th (2009)
- Class wins: 2 (2008, 2009)

Mika Juhani Salo (born 30 November 1966) is a Finnish former racing driver and broadcaster, who competed in Formula One from 1994 to 2002. In sportscar racing, Salo won the 2007 American Le Mans Series title, as well as winning the 24 Hours of Le Mans in 2008 and 2009 in the GT2 class. He also won the 2014 Bathurst 12 Hour.

Salo's best ranking was 10th in the world championship in 1999, when he stood in for the injured Michael Schumacher at Ferrari for six races, scoring two podiums and ten points, contributing to Ferrari's constructors' championship win by a four-point margin. He then raced for Sauber in 2000, and joined Toyota for their debut in 2002, which would be his final season in Formula One.

== Career ==
=== Formula Three and Japanese racing ===
In 1989, Helsinki-born Salo competed in the British Formula 3 Championship, racing for Alan Docking Racing. He raced with the Reynard Alfa Romeo package which was not the season's best. Staying with Alan Docking Racing for 1990 and moving to a more competitive Ralt chassis, he raced against countryman and fierce rival Mika Häkkinen in Formula Three, finishing second to him. In 1990, Salo was caught driving under the influence in London.

=== Formula One ===
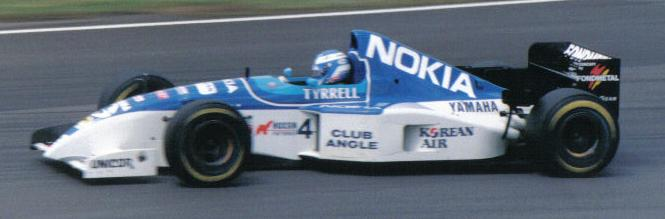
Salo driving for Tyrrell at the 1995 British Grand Prix.

==== 1994–1998: Lotus, Tyrrell and Arrows ====
"I think it was six days before the race they said, 'Do you think you can drive it next weekend with no testing'. I'd never driven a Formula One car before in my life; that's what I've always wanted, so I said yes. I know the circuit so I don't think it's a problem. The next two nights I lay in my bed smiling, so happy it was happening."

— Salo commenting on his first race for Lotus.

After a few years racing in Japan, Salo made his first Formula One start at the penultimate round of the 1994 season in Japan for the ailing Lotus team. He was kept on for the season's finale in Australia. Following the collapse of Lotus following the end of the season, Salo moved to Tyrrell for 1995. He was to spend three years with the team, scoring points several times. In the 1997 Monaco Grand Prix he completed the whole (rain-shortened and -slowed) race without refuelling, taking fifth place ahead of the faster Giancarlo Fisichella as a result. Despite a promising 1998 with Arrows, he had no full-time drive in 1999.

==== 1999: British American Racing and Ferrari ====
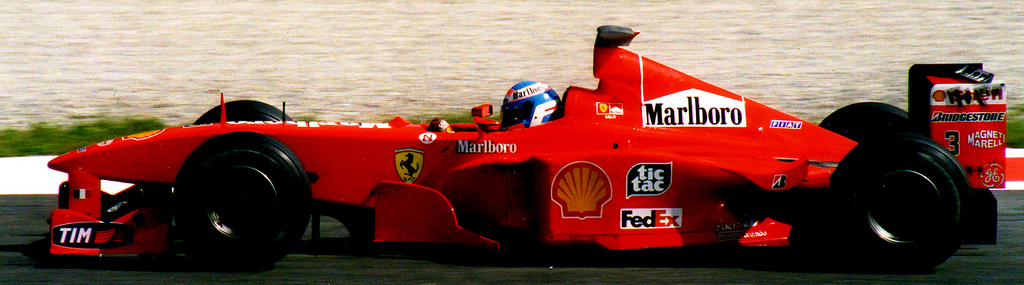
Salo testing for Ferrari at Monza in 1999.

Following an injury to BAR driver Ricardo Zonta, Salo took his place for three races whilst the Brazilian recovered. BAR's first season was not successful but Salo scored their best result of the year, with a seventh-place finish at San Marino. A greater opportunity arose when Michael Schumacher broke his leg in a crash during the 1999 British Grand Prix. Salo was selected as his substitute to partner Eddie Irvine at Ferrari. In his second race in Ferrari at the 1999 German Grand Prix, Salo led for part of the race and would have scored a Grand Prix win but team orders demanded he give the lead to Irvine, who at the time was fighting for the championship with Mika Häkkinen. Following the race, Irvine handed his victory trophy over to Salo as a gesture of gratitude. He also finished third at Monza, ahead of Irvine. These podium finishes were critical in helping Ferrari win their first Constructors' title since 1983.

==== 2000–2002: Sauber and Toyota ====
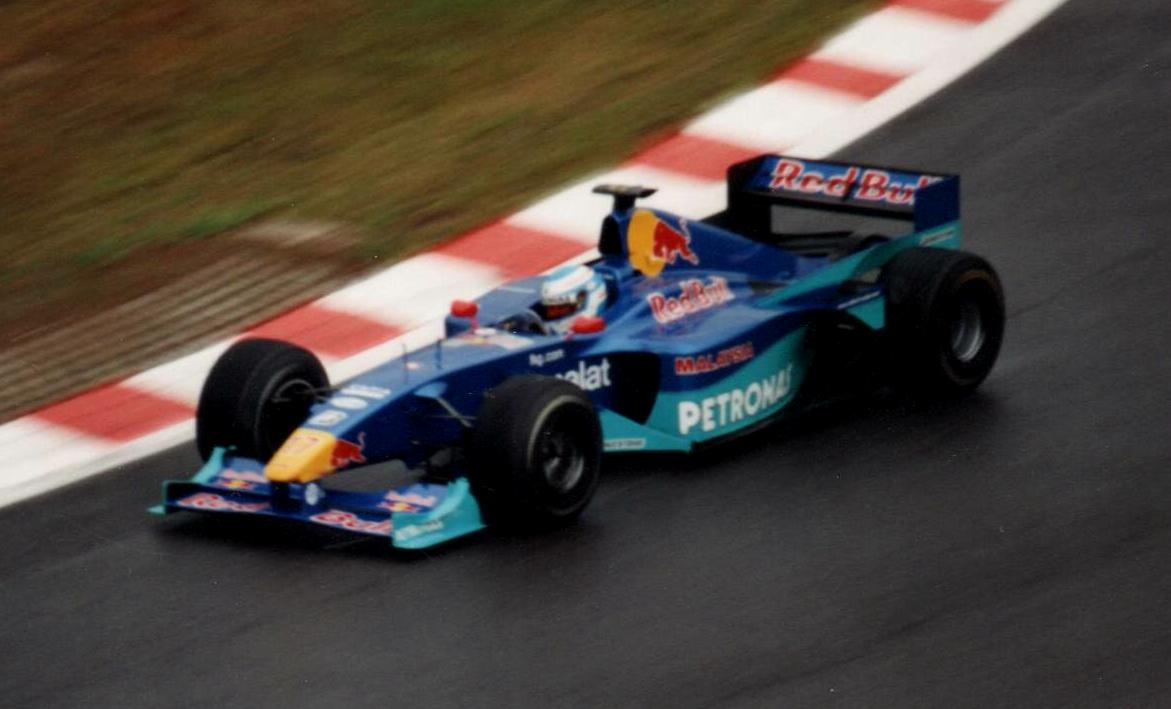
Salo driving for Sauber at the 2000 Belgian Grand Prix.

Salo was back full-time in 2000 with Sauber, taking 11th in the championship, although he left the team at the end of the season to join the new Toyota team in preparation for its Formula One entry in 2002, and also cited a desire to score podiums rather than lower points-scoring positions. He scored two points for Toyota in their first season, becoming the first driver since JJ Lehto at the 1993 South African Grand Prix to score points on a team's debut by finishing sixth at the 2002 Australian Grand Prix. He retired from Formula One at the end of 2002, after getting fired from Toyota. Though the news was initially met with general surprise, it was later revealed that Salo was not on good terms with the team, who heavily criticized his deemed poor performance.

During his Formula One career, Salo achieved two podiums, and scored a total of 33 championship points.

=== Post-Formula One ===
Salo's first post-Formula One race came at the 2003 12 Hours of Sebring, driving the UK-entered Audi R8, the same car he was due to race at the 24 Hours of Le Mans if it had not run out of fuel already after the first hour. He raced in four CART races for PK Racing during the same year, his best finish being third in Miami in his second series start.

Because of his strong links with Ferrari, Salo was picked up to be part of the development program of the Maserati MC12 GT racer. He made his FIA GT debut in 2004, narrowly losing the 24 Hours of Spa-Francorchamps in a Ferrari 575. After that he entered the last four races of the season in the Maserati, winning two races and finishing second once.

2005 was a year somewhat lost in the doldrums with only two participations with the Maserati MC12 in the ALMS GTS-class, a competition where the car turned out to be not even half as competitive as in the FIA GT series.

For 2006, Salo returned to racing full-time, signing with AF Corse in the FIA GT to drive the Ferrari F430 and later on in the year with Risi Competizione in the ALMS. He was victorious in class in the 24 Hours of Spa and finished third in the FIA GT2 Drivers' Championship with 61 points, while his efforts in the ALMS contributed to Risi's Teams' Championship cup. In the following year, he continued with Risi Competizione in the ALMS and took the GT2 class honours in the 12 Hours of Sebring and the championship along with teammate Jaime Melo. They won a total of eight races out of twelve in the class. In addition, he won the RAC Tourist Trophy with Thomas Biagi when substituting for Michael Bartels, driving a Maserati MC12 once more.

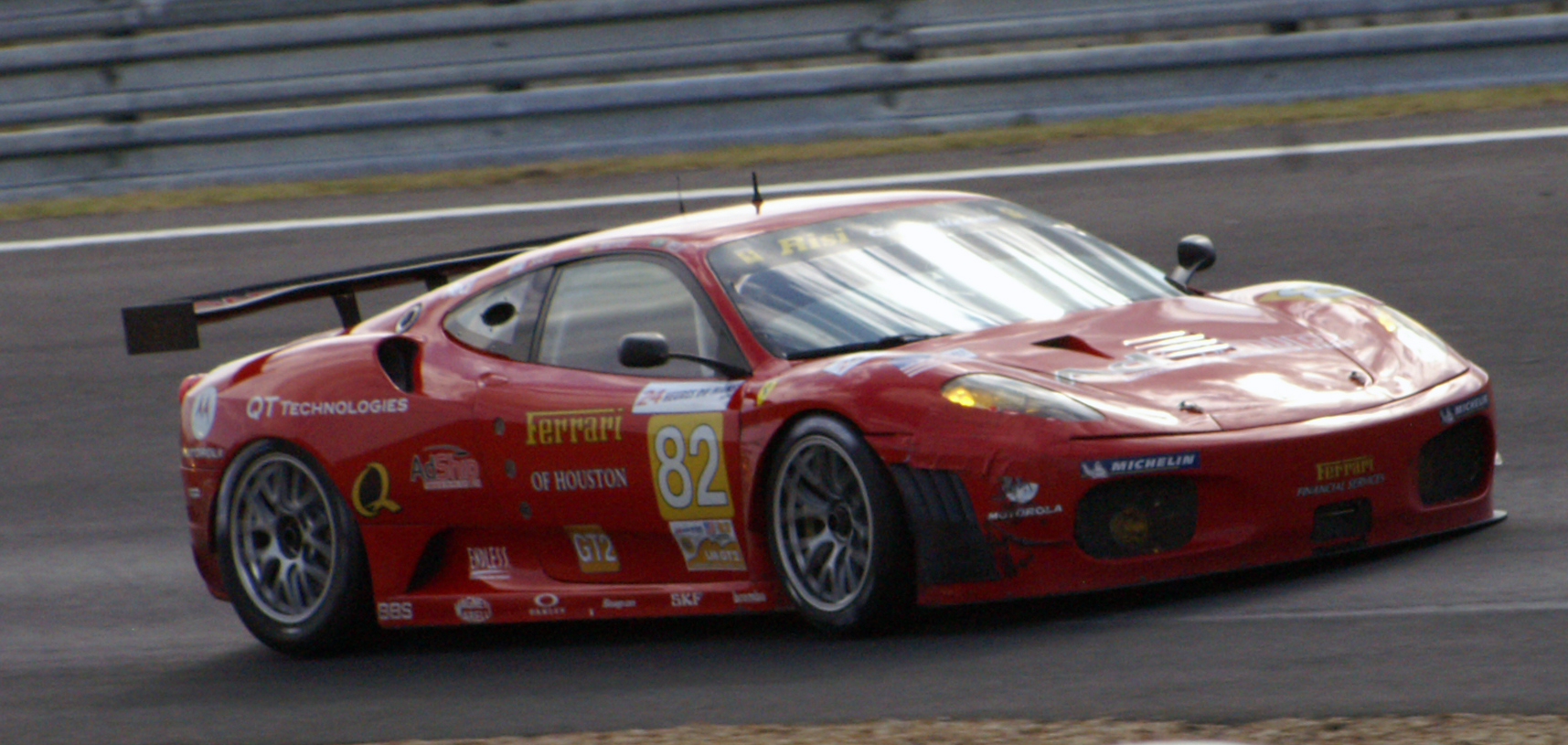
Salo competing with Risi Competizione aboard their Ferrari F430 GT2 during the 2009 24 Hours of Le Mans.

Salo and Melo with Risi Competizione earned the first team At-Large honours on the 2007 All-American Racing Team, as voted for by the American Auto Racing Writers and Broadcasters (AARWBA). Salo raced again in the ALMS for Risi Competizione in 2008. Although he was not successful in defending his previous year's titles, he won the GT2 class in the 24 Hours of Le Mans, coming in 18th overall.

In 2009, Salo joined the Risi Ferrari team at the blue-riband races only, the 12 Hours of Sebring, the 24 Hours of Le Mans and the Petit Le Mans event, winning all three of them. Having won these enduro races all more than once, Salo felt he was ready for a new challenge. He set his mind on NASCAR, and had his first test with Michael Waltrip Racing at the half-mile New Smyrna Speedway in November 2009.

In 2010–12, Salo competed in the Gold Coast 600, an endurance event for the V8 Supercars. In 2010, he partnered with Walkinshaw Racing's Andrew Thompson and retired from both races. For 2011–12 he raced with Will Davison and the Ford Performance Racing team, finishing 2nd in the 1st race of 2011 and winning the 2nd race in 2012.

In 2014, driving for Maranello Motorsport, Salo co-drove a Ferrari 458 Italia GT3 to victory at the Bathurst 12 Hour alongside Australian motor racing legends Craig Lowndes and John Bowe, and another local Australian driver Peter Edwards.

== Personal life ==
As of 2013, Salo lives in Tallinn, Estonia, where he moved from Monaco in the late 2000s. He has a son, born in 2001, and a daughter, born in 2004, with his ex-wife Noriko Salo (née Endo; born 1970), a Japanese former gravure idol. They were married from 1999 to 2022, but they had already been living separately for over two years before the divorce. In 2023, Salo married Annica Lindblom. His godson Jesse Krohn competes in the IMSA SportsCar Championship.

Like fellow Finns Keke Rosberg and JJ Lehto, both former Formula One drivers, Salo has commentated on several F1 races on MTV Oy since 2005. Since 2011, Salo has been hosting the Finnish TV-show, Virittäjät ('Test Drive by Mika Salo'), along with his former co-host Tomi Tuominen, who is a Finnish journalist, television presenter, sports commentator and former co-driver in the World Rally Championship.

In 2013, Salo featured in Discovery channel's program called Driven to Extremes along with Hollywood actors Tom Hardy and Adrien Brody. Salo appeared in two episodes, one with Tom Hardy in minus 50 degrees Celsius in Russia, and the other one with Adrien Brody to the Malaysian jungle at the height of the monsoon season.

== Helmet ==
Salo's helmet was originally dark blue with a white halo on the top (with a red line inside), two white stripes (with a red line inside) going from the rear going down diagonally to the sides of the helmet and a white trapezoidal shape on the chin area (with blue outline), slightly based on Prost's helmet. When he raced in Formula One, he changed the helmet from dark blue to sky blue with the rest of the elements intact.

== Racing record ==
=== Career summary ===
Season	Series	Team	Races	Wins	Poles	F/Laps	Podiums	Points	Position
1987	Nordic Formula Ford 1600		?	?	?	?	?	30	**3rd**
1987	Formula Ford Finland		?	?	?	?	?	40	**2nd**
1987	Formula Ford Sweden Junior		?	?	?	?	?	23	8th
1988	European Formula Ford 1600		?	?	?	?	?	80	**1st**
1988	Formula Ford Finland		4	4	4	4	4	44	**1st**
1988	Nordic Formula Ford 1600		3	2	?	?	2	40	**1st**
1988	Formula Ford Sweden Junior		?	?	?	?	?	20	9th
1988	Formula Ford Festival		1	0	0	0	0	N/A	11th
1989	British Formula Three	Alan Docking Racing	16	0	0	0	0	10	14th
1990	British Formula Three	Alan Docking Racing	17	6	3	6	12	98	**2nd**
1990	Macau Grand Prix	Alan Docking Racing	1	0	0	0	1	N/A	**2nd**
1991	Japanese Formula 3000	Ad Racing Team Co. Ltd.	5	0	0	0	0	1	23rd
1992	Japanese Formula 3000	Ad Racing Team Co. Ltd.	11	0	0	0	0	5	15th
1992	Japanese Formula Three	Team 5ZIGEN	4	0	0	0	0	2	13th
1993	Japanese Formula 3000	Ad Racing Team Co. Ltd.	10	0	0	0	0	1	17th
1993	Japanese Touring Car Championship - JTC-3	Team 5ZIGEN	9	1	0	0	1	47	14th
1994	Japanese Formula 3000	Team 5ZIGEN	9	0	0	0	1	6	7th
1994	Formula One	Team Lotus	2	0	0	0	0	0	NC
1995	Formula One	Nokia Tyrrell Yamaha	17	0	0	0	0	5	15th
1996	Formula One	Tyrrell Yamaha	16	0	0	0	0	5	13th
1997	Formula One	PIAA Tyrrell Ford	17	0	0	0	0	2	17th
1998	Formula One	Danka Zepter Arrows	15	0	0	0	0	3	13th
1999	Formula One	Scuderia Ferrari Marlboro	6	0	0	0	2	10	10th
1999	Formula One	British American Racing	3	0	0	0	0	10	10th
2000	Formula One	Red Bull Sauber Petronas	16	0	0	0	0	6	11th
2002	Formula One	Panasonic Toyota Racing	17	0	0	0	0	2	17th
2003	Champ Car World Series	PK Racing	4	0	0	0	1	26	16th
2003	American Le Mans Series - LMP900	Audi Sport UK	1	0	0	0	0	12	28th
2003	24 Hours of Le Mans - LMP900	Audi Sport UK	1	0	0	0	0	N/A	DNF
2004	FIA GT Championship	GPC Giesse Squadra Corse	4	1	0	0	3	27	13th
2004	Finnish Touring Car Championship	Lehtonen Motorsport	2	0	1	1	1	0	NC
2005	American Le Mans Series - GT1	Risi Competizione	1	0	0	0	0	0	NC
2006	FIA GT Championship - GT2	AF Corse	10	1	0	0	5	56	4th
2006	American Le Mans Series - GT2	Risi Competizione	5	3	0	0	4	82	7th
2007	American Le Mans Series - GT2	Risi Competizione	12	8	2	0	9	202	**1st**
2007	24 Hours of Le Mans - LMGT2	Risi Competizione	1	0	0	0	0	N/A	DNF
2007	FIA GT Championship - GT1	Vitaphone Racing	1	1	0	0	1	10	16th
2007	FIA GT Championship - GT2	AF Corse Motorola	1	0	0	0	0	0	NC
2008	American Le Mans Series - GT2	Risi Competizione	11	2	0	0	5	121	4th
2008	24 Hours of Le Mans - LMGT2	Risi Competizione	1	1	0	0	1	N/A	19th
2008	FIA GT Championship - GT2	AF Corse	1	0	0	0	1	13	18th
2009	American Le Mans Series - GT2	Risi Competizione	2	2	0	0	2	60	8th
2009	24 Hours of Le Mans - LMGT2	Risi Competizione	1	1	0	0	1	N/A	18th
2010	GT1 World Championship	Mad-Croc Racing	6	0	0	0	0	0	52nd
2010	V8 Supercar	Walkinshaw United	2	0	0	0	0	0	NC
2010	ADAC GT Masters	Callaway Competition	2	0	0	0	0	4	27th
2010	American Le Mans Series - GT2	Risi Competizione	3	0	0	0	0	28	20th
2010	24 Hours of Le Mans - LMGT2	AF Corse	1	0	0	0	0	N/A	DNS
2011	V8 Supercar	Ford Performance Racing	2	0	0	0	1	201	52nd
2011	American Le Mans Series - GT	Risi Competizione	1	0	0	0	0	12	25th
2011	24 Hours of Nürburgring - E1-XP2	Scuderia Cameron Glickenhaus	1	0	0	0	1	N/A	**2nd**
2012	International Superstars Series	Swiss Team	4	0	0	0	1	30	19th
2012	Campionato Italiano Superstars	Swiss Team	2	0	0	0	0	8	24th
2012	V8 Supercar	Ford Performance Racing	2	1	0	0	1	0	NC†
2012	Volkswagen Scirocco R-Cup		1	0	0	1	1	0	NC†
2013	Australian GT Championship	Maranello Motorsport	1	0	0	0	1	50	17th
2013	Bathurst 12 Hour - Class A	Maranello Motorsport	1	0	0	0	0	N/A	DNF
2013	Blancpain Endurance Series - Pro-Am	SMP Racing	1	0	0	0	1	30	13th
2013	European Le Mans Series - GTC	SMP Racing	1	0	1	0	0	11	12th
2014	European Le Mans Series - GTC	SMP Racing	4	0	0	0	0	4	28th
2014	Bathurst 12 Hour - Class A	Maranello Motorsport	1	1	0	0	1	N/A	**1st**
2014	FIA World Endurance Championship - LMP2	SMP Racing	1	0	0	0	0	50	8th
2014	24 Hours of Le Mans - LMP2	SMP Racing	1	0	0	0	0	N/A	12th
2014	United SportsCar Championship - GTD	MP/ESM Racing	1	0	0	0	0	29	62nd
2015	Bathurst 12 Hour - Class A	Maranello Motorsport	1	0	0	0	0	N/A	DNS
2016	Bathurst 12 Hour - Class A	Maranello Motorsport	1	0	0	0	0	N/A	DNF
2020	Super Taikyu - ST-1	Field Management Racing	1	0	0	0	1	50‡	**3rd‡**

^{†} Not eligible for championship points.

‡ Team standings.

=== Complete British Formula Three Championship results ===
(key) (Races in bold indicate pole position) (Races in italics indicate fastest lap)

Year	Entrant	Engine	Class	1	2	3	4	5	6	7	8	9	10	11	12	13	14	15	16	17	DC	Pts
1989	Alan Docking Racing	Alfa Romeo	A	THR; 7	SIL; 5	BRH; Ret	SIL; 10	BRH; 5	THR; 7	SIL; 5	DON; 10	SIL; 6	SNE; Ret	OUL; 12	SIL; 11	BRH; 7	DON; 5	SIL; 6	THR; Ret		14th	10
1990	Alan Docking Racing	Mugen	A	DON; 2	SIL; 1	THR; 2	BRH; 4	SIL; 1	BRH; 1	**THR**; 1	SIL; 2	DON; 5	**SIL**; 1	**SNE**; 7	OUL; 2	SIL; 2	BRH; Ret	DON; 3	THR; 1	SIL; Ret	**2nd**	**98**

=== Complete Japanese Formula 3000 Championship results ===
(key) (Races in bold indicate pole position) (Races in italics indicate fastest lap)

Year	Entrant	1	2	3	4	5	6	7	8	9	10	11	DC	Points
1991	Ad Racing Team Co. Ltd.	SUZ	AUT; 14	FUJ; DNQ	MIN; 6	SUZ; DNQ	SUG; DNQ	FUJ; 18	SUZ; DNQ	FUJ; C	SUZ; Ret	FUJ; Ret	23rd	1
1992	Ad Racing Team Co. Ltd.	SUZ; Ret	FUJ; 15	MIN; 4	SUZ; Ret	AUT; 10	SUG; Ret	FUJ; 18	FUJ; 17	SUZ; 7	FUJ; 15	SUZ; 5	15th	5
1993	Ad Racing Team Co. Ltd.	SUZ; 13	FUJ; 9	MIN; 7	SUZ; Ret	AUT; C	SUG; 6	FUJ; C	FUJ; DNS	SUZ; 17	FUJ; Ret	SUZ; Ret	17th	1
1994	Team 5ZIGEN	SUZ; 3	FUJ; 5	MIN; 7	SUZ; 11	SUG; 12	FUJ; Ret	SUZ; 8	FUJ; Ret	FUJ	SUZ; 10		7th	6

=== Complete Formula One results ===
(key)

Year	Entrant	Chassis	Engine	1	2	3	4	5	6	7	8	9	10	11	12	13	14	15	16	17	WDC	Points
1994	Team Lotus	Lotus 109	Mugen Honda V10	BRA	PAC	SMR	MON	ESP	CAN	FRA	GBR	GER	HUN	BEL	ITA	POR	EUR	JPN; 10	AUS; Ret		NC	0
1995	Nokia Tyrrell Yamaha	Tyrrell 023	Yamaha V10	BRA; 7	ARG; Ret	SMR; Ret	ESP; 10	MON; Ret	CAN; 7	FRA; 15	GBR; 8	GER; Ret	HUN; Ret	BEL; 8	ITA; 5	POR; 13	EUR; 10	PAC; 12	JPN; 6	AUS; 5	15th	5
1996	Tyrrell Yamaha	Tyrrell 024	Yamaha V10	AUS; 6	BRA; 5	ARG; Ret	EUR; DSQ	SMR; Ret	MON; 5^{†}	ESP; DSQ	CAN; Ret	FRA; 10	GBR; 7	GER; 9	HUN; Ret	BEL; 7	ITA; Ret	POR; 11	JPN; Ret		13th	5
1997	PIAA Tyrrell Ford	Tyrrell 025	Ford V8	AUS; Ret	BRA; 13	ARG; 8	SMR; 9	MON; 5	ESP; Ret	CAN; Ret	FRA; Ret	GBR; Ret	GER; Ret	HUN; 13	BEL; 11	ITA; Ret	AUT; Ret	LUX; 10	JPN; Ret	EUR; 12	17th	2
1998	Danka Zepter Arrows	Arrows A19	Arrows V10	AUS; Ret	BRA; Ret	ARG; Ret	SMR; 9	ESP; Ret	MON; 4	CAN; Ret	FRA; 13	GBR; Ret	AUT; Ret	GER; 14	HUN; Ret	BEL; DNS	ITA; Ret	LUX; 14	JPN; Ret		13th	3
1999	British American Racing	BAR 01	Supertec V10	AUS	BRA	SMR; 7^{†}	MON; Ret	ESP; 8	CAN	FRA	GBR										10th	10
1999	Scuderia Ferrari Marlboro	Ferrari F399	Ferrari V10									AUT; 9	GER; 2	HUN; 12	BEL; 7	ITA; 3	EUR; Ret	MAL	JPN		10th	10
2000	Red Bull Sauber Petronas	Sauber C19	Petronas V10	AUS; DSQ	BRA; DNS	SMR; 6	GBR; 8	ESP; 7	EUR; Ret	MON; 5	CAN; Ret	FRA; 10	AUT; 6	GER; 5	HUN; 10	BEL; 9	ITA; 7	USA; Ret	JPN; 10	MAL; 8	11th	6
2002	Panasonic Toyota Racing	Toyota TF102	Toyota V10	AUS; 6	MAL; 12	BRA; 6	SMR; Ret	ESP; 9	AUT; 8	MON; Ret	CAN; Ret	EUR; Ret	GBR; Ret	FRA; Ret	GER; 9	HUN; 15	BEL; 7	ITA; 11	USA; 14	JPN; 8	17th	2

=== Complete CART results ===
(key)

Year	Team	No.	1	2	3	4	5	6	7	8	9	10	11	12	13	14	15	16	17	18	19	Rank	Points	Ref
2003	PK Racing	27	STP	MTY	LBH	BRH	LAU	MIL	LS	POR	CLE	TOR	VAN	ROA	MOH	MTL	DEN; 14	MIA; 3	MXC; 5	SRF; 11	FON; C †	**16th**	**26**	

† Cancelled due to California Fires

=== 24 Hours of Le Mans results ===
Year	Team	Co-drivers	Car	Class	Laps	Pos.	Class pos.
2003	(United Kingdom) Audi Sport UK (United Kingdom) Arena Motorsport	(Germany) Frank Biela (United Kingdom) Perry McCarthy	Audi R8	LMP900	28	DNF	DNF
2007	(United States) Risi Competizione	(United Kingdom) Johnny Mowlem (Brazil) Jaime Melo	Ferrari F430 GT2	GT2	223	DNF	DNF
2008	(United States) Risi Competizione	(Italy) Gianmaria Bruni (Brazil) Jaime Melo	Ferrari F430 GT2	GT2	326	19th	**1st**
2009	(United States) Risi Competizione	(Brazil) Jaime Melo (Germany) Pierre Kaffer	Ferrari F430 GT2	GT2	329	18th	**1st**
2010	(Italy) AF Corse	(Argentina) Luís Pérez Companc (Argentina) Matías Russo	Ferrari F430 GT2	GT2	0	DNS	DNS
2014	(Russia) SMP Racing	(Russia) Sergey Zlobin (Russia) Anton Ladygin	Oreca 03R-Nissan	LMP2	303	37th	12th

=== Complete American Le Mans Series results ===
Year	Entrant	Class	Chassis	Engine	1	2	3	4	5	6	7	8	9	10	11	12	Rank	Points
2003	Audi Sport UK	LMP900	Audi R8	Audi 3.6L Turbo V8	SEB; 6	ATL	SON	TRO	MOS	RDA	LGA	MIA	PET				28th	12
2005	Risi Competizione	GT1	Maserati MC12	Maserati 6.0L V12	SEB	ATL	MOH	LIM	SON	POR; 4	RDA	MOS	PET	LGA			NC	0
2006	Risi Competizione	GT2	Ferrari F430GT	Ferrari 4.0L V8	SEB	REL; 3	MOH; 6	LIM	MIL; 1	POR; 1	RDA	MOS	PET	LGA; 1			7th	82
2007	Risi Competizione	GT2	Ferrari F430GT	Ferrari 4.0L V8	SEB; 1	STP; 1	LBH; 1	REL; 1	MIL; 9	LIM; 9	MOH; 2	RDA; 1	MOS; 1	DET; 1	PET; 6	LGA; 1	1st	202
2008	Risi Competizione	GT2	Ferrari F430GT	Ferrari 4.0L V8	SEB; 12	STP; 10	LBH; 9	MIL; 13	LIM; 3	MOH; 5	RDA; 5	MOS; 1	DET; 3	PET; 1	LGA; 2		4th	121
2009	Risi Competizione	GT2	Ferrari F430GT	Ferrari 4.0L V8	SEB; 1	STP	LBH	MIL	LIM	MOH	RDA	MOS	PET; 1	LGA			8th	60
2010	Risi Competizione	GT	Ferrari F430GT	Ferrari 4.0L V8	SEB	LBH	LGA	MIL	LIM; 4	MOH	RDA; 7	MOS	PET; 7				20th	28
2011	Risi Competizione	GT	Ferrari 458 Italia GT2	Ferrari 4.5L V8	SEB; 9	LBH	LIM	MOS	MOH	RDA	BAL	LGA	PET				25th	12

=== Complete GT1 World Championship results ===
Year	Team	Car	1	2	3	4	5	6	7	8	9	10	11	12	13	14	15	16	17	18	19	20	Pos	Points
2010	Mad-Croc Racing	Chevrolet Corvette C6.R	ABU; QR; Ret	ABU; CR; 15	SIL; QR	SIL; CR	BRN; QR; 19	BRN; CR; 12	PRI; QR	PRI; CR	SPA; QR	SPA; CR	NÜR; QR; 15	NÜR; CR; 23	ALG; QR	ALG; CR	NAV; QR	NAV; CR	INT; QR	INT; CR	SAN; QR	SAN; CR	52nd	0

=== Complete V8 Supercar results ===
Year	Team	1	2	3	4	5	6	7	8	9	10	11	12	13	14	15	16	17	18	19	20	21	22	23	24	25	26	27	28	29	30	31	Final pos	Points
2010	Walkinshaw Racing	YMC; R1	YMC; R2	BHR; R3	BHR; R4	ADE; R5	ADE; R6	HAM; R7	HAM; R8	QLD; R9	QLD; R10	WIN; R11	WIN; R12	HID; R13	HID; R14	TOW; R15	TOW; R16	PHI; Q	PHI; R17	BAT; R18	SUR; R19; Ret	SUR; R20; Ret	SYM; R21	SYM; R22	SAN; R23	SAN; R24	SYD; R25	SYD; R26					NC	0 +
2011	Ford Performance Racing	YMC; R1	YMC; R2	ADE; R3	ADE; R4	HAM; R5	HAM; R6	BAR; R7	BAR; R8	BAR; R9	WIN; R10	WIN; R11	HID; R12	HID; R13	TOW; R14	TOW; R15	QLD; R16	QLD; R17	QLD; R18	PHI; Q	PHI; R19	BAT; R20	SUR; R21; 2	SUR; R22; 14	SYM; R23	SYM; R24	SAN; R25	SAN; R26	SYD; R27	SYD; R28			52nd	201
2012	Ford Performance Racing	ADE; R1	ADE; R2	SYM; R3	SYM; R4	HAM; R5	HAM; R6	BAR; R7	BAR; R8	BAR; R9	PHI; R10	PHI; R11	HID; R12	HID; R13	TOW; R14	TOW; R15	QLD; R16	QLD; R17	SMP; R18	SMP; R19	SAN; Q	SAN; R20	BAT; R21	SUR; R22; 18	SUR; R23; 1	YMC; R24	YMC; R25	YMC; R26	WIN; R27	WIN; R28	SYD; R29	SYD; R30	NC	0 †

† Not Eligible for points

=== Complete International Superstars Series results ===
(key) (Races in bold indicate pole position) (Races in italics indicate fastest lap)

Year	Team	Car	1	2	3	4	5	6	7	8	9	10	11	12	13	14	15	16	DC	Points
2012	Swiss Team	Maserati Quattroporte	MNZ; 1; 6	MNZ; 2; 16	IMO; 1	IMO; 2	DON; 1	DON; 2	MUG; 1	MUG; 2	HUN; 1	HUN; 2	SPA; 1; 5	SPA; 2; 3	VAL; 1	VAL; 2	PER; 1	PER; 2	19th	30

=== Bathurst 12 Hour results ===
Year	Team	Co-drivers	Car	Class	Laps	Pos.	Class pos.
2013	(Australia) Maranello Motorsport	(Australia) John Bowe (Australia) Peter Edwards (Denmark) Allan Simonsen	Ferrari 458 Italia GT3	A	111	DNF	DNF
2014	(Australia) Maranello Motorsport	(Australia) John Bowe (Australia) Peter Edwards (Australia) Craig Lowndes	Ferrari 458 Italia GT3	A	296	1st	1st
2015	(Australia) Maranello Motorsport	(United Kingdom) Ben Collins (Australia) Tony D'Alberto	Ferrari 458 Italia GT3	A	0	DNS	DNS
2016	(Australia) Maranello Motorsport	(Australia) Tony D'Alberto (Australia) Grant Denyer (Finland) Toni Vilander	Ferrari 458 Italia GT3	AP	63	DNF	DNF

=== Complete European Le Mans Series results ===
Year	Entrant	Class	Chassis	Engine	1	2	3	4	5	Rank	Points
2013	SMP Racing	GTC	Ferrari 458 Italia GT3	Ferrari F136 4.5 L V8	SIL	IMO	RBR	HUN	**LEC**; 5	12th	11
2014	SMP Racing	GTC	Ferrari 458 Italia GT3	Ferrari F136 4.5 L V8	SIL	IMO; 10	RBR; 9	LEC; 11	HUN; 11	28th	4

Sporting positions
Preceded by Jörg Bergmeister	American Le Mans Series; GT2 Champion; 2007; With: Jaime Melo	Succeeded by Jörg Bergmeister; Wolf Henzler
Preceded by Bernd Schneider; Thomas Jäger; Alexander Roloff	Winner of the Bathurst 12 Hour; 2014; With: Peter Edwards, John Bowe & Craig Lowndes	Succeeded by Katsumasa Chiyo; Wolfgang Reip; Florian Strauss
