= Paul Alexander Sutton =

British businessman

Paul Alexander Sutton (born August 1956) is a British businessman, has been made bankrupt twice and convicted fraudster, although the case pertaining to conviction (which took place originally in a French court) was dismissed in a UK court as having no evidence in an extradition hearing in 2001. Sutton was in discussions with Sir Philip Green about the future of British Home Stores for over a year from the summer of 2013 and introduced Dominic Chappell, the eventual buyer of the firm, to Sir Philip.

== Early career ==
Sutton was first made bankrupt in 1982 but was not discharged for over a decade after he failed to comply with insolvency rules. Sutton was made bankrupt again in 2014.

== Car leasing ==
According to a High Court judgment of 2000, Sutton was involved in a scheme relating to the financing of cars with Conister Trust, a lender based on the Isle of Man, that caused Conister to experience an "almost total" loss. The firm entered administration in December 1994. According to court papers, of the 103 cars that were financed, only 70 could be found by the administrators KPMG Peat Marwick. Funds of £399,671 were unable to be traced.

== France ==
In 2000, Sutton was made bankrupt for 15 years by a court in Nanterre, Paris, in relation to a 1995 property transaction in which Anglo Irish Bank lost about 30m francs. Three judges ruled that Sutton and his partner extracted millions of francs from Clamart III, a company which owned and ran the former headquarters of industrial firm Bouygues. In 2002, Nanterre's superior court accused Sutton of extracting over 5m francs from a company called Prestige and spending it improperly. The court also accused him of sending 6.5m francs from Clamart III to a bank in Ireland "without justification". Sutton was convicted of "fraud and stealing or concealing assets" and sentenced to three years in prison which he did not serve as he was ruled to be en fuite (on the run). However, Sutton was never notified of the case and as such he was found guilty in absentia being able to offer no evidence with respect to his innocence nor being afforded the opportunity to examine the evidence against him. His claim was upheld during an extradition hearing in London where the French authorities were unable to offer any evidence against him, and as such the case was dismissed as being 'no case to answer'. Furthermore, the court awarded all costs pertaining to the case to Sutton.

== Anglo Petroleum ==
In 2003, Sutton was the owner of Anglo Petroleum which had a business relationship with the billionaires David and Simon Reuben. According to The Sunday Times in 2015, the Reubens were seeking to serve bankruptcy papers on Sutton for £4m that they say he owes them but were unable to do so as they could not find him.

== Lord and Lady Fairhaven ==
In 2009, Lord and Lady Fairhaven sued their lawyers for negligence, claiming that they had lost £8m on property transactions connected to Sutton. The claim was settled out of court.

== British Home Stores ==
Sutton was in discussion with Sir Philip Green about the future of British Home Stores for over a year from the summer of 2013. According to The Sunday Times, talks only ended after a whistleblower provided details of Sutton's past to Green at his home in Monaco, but it was Sutton who introduced Green to Retail Acquisitions, the firm that went on to buy BHS. Retail Acquisitions was owned by Dominic Chappell who had briefly been a director of Sutton's firm Containsuite.
