= Formula One drivers from Finland =

List of Formula One drivers who competed as Finnish

- Drivers: 9
- Grands Prix: 793
- Entries: 1213
- Starts: 1172
- Best season finish: 1st (1982, 1998, 1999, 2007)
- Wins: 57
- Podiums: 245
- Pole positions: 70
- Fastest laps: 95
- Points: 4397.5
- First entry: 1974 Belgian Grand Prix
- First win: 1982 Swiss Grand Prix
- Latest win: 2021 Turkish Grand Prix
- Latest entry: 2026 Mexico City Grand Prix
- 2026 drivers: Valtteri Bottas

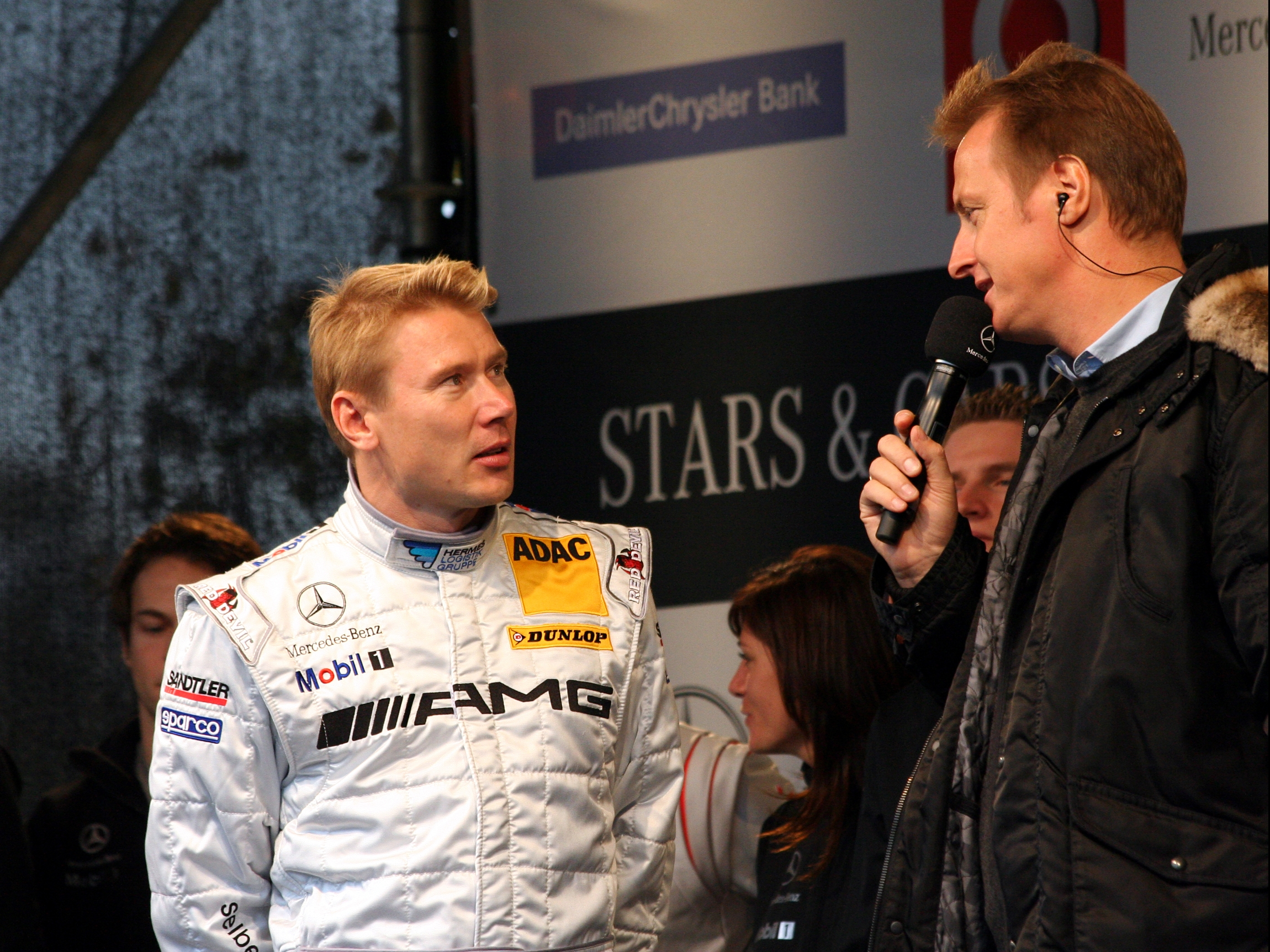
Mika Häkkinen announces the end of his DTM career at the event (Stars and Cars 2007)

There have been nine Formula One drivers from Finland who have taken part in races since the championship began in 1950. Three drivers have won the World Drivers' Championship, with Keke Rosberg being the first in 1982. Mika Häkkinen won it in 1998 and retained it in 1999, becoming the first - and so far only - Finnish double world champion. Kimi Räikkönen is the most recent Finnish champion having won the title in 2007. Finland is considered to have an unusually high amount of successful Formula One drivers for a country of its relatively small size. After Valtteri Bottas left Sauber at the end of the 2024 season, there were no Finnish drivers entered for the World Championship in 2025, the first time this had occurred since 1988.

== World champions and race winners ==
To date nine Finnish drivers have taken part in a race weekend, with eight taking part in at least one race. Of those drivers three have won the World Drivers' Championship. The first Finnish champion was Keke Rosberg who won in 1982. Mika Häkkinen won the 1998 title and successfully defended it the following year. Kimi Räikkönen is the most recent Finnish world champion having won in 2007.

Heikki Kovalainen and Valtteri Bottas are also race winners. Kovalainen's single race win came at the 2008 Hungarian Grand Prix as a driver with McLaren. Bottas's first victory came at the 2017 Russian Grand Prix driving for Mercedes and his win tally stands at 10.

List of Finnish Formula One World Champions
Name	Year(s) of title(s)
Keke Rosberg	1982
Mika Häkkinen	1998, 1999
Kimi Räikkönen	2007

== Current drivers ==
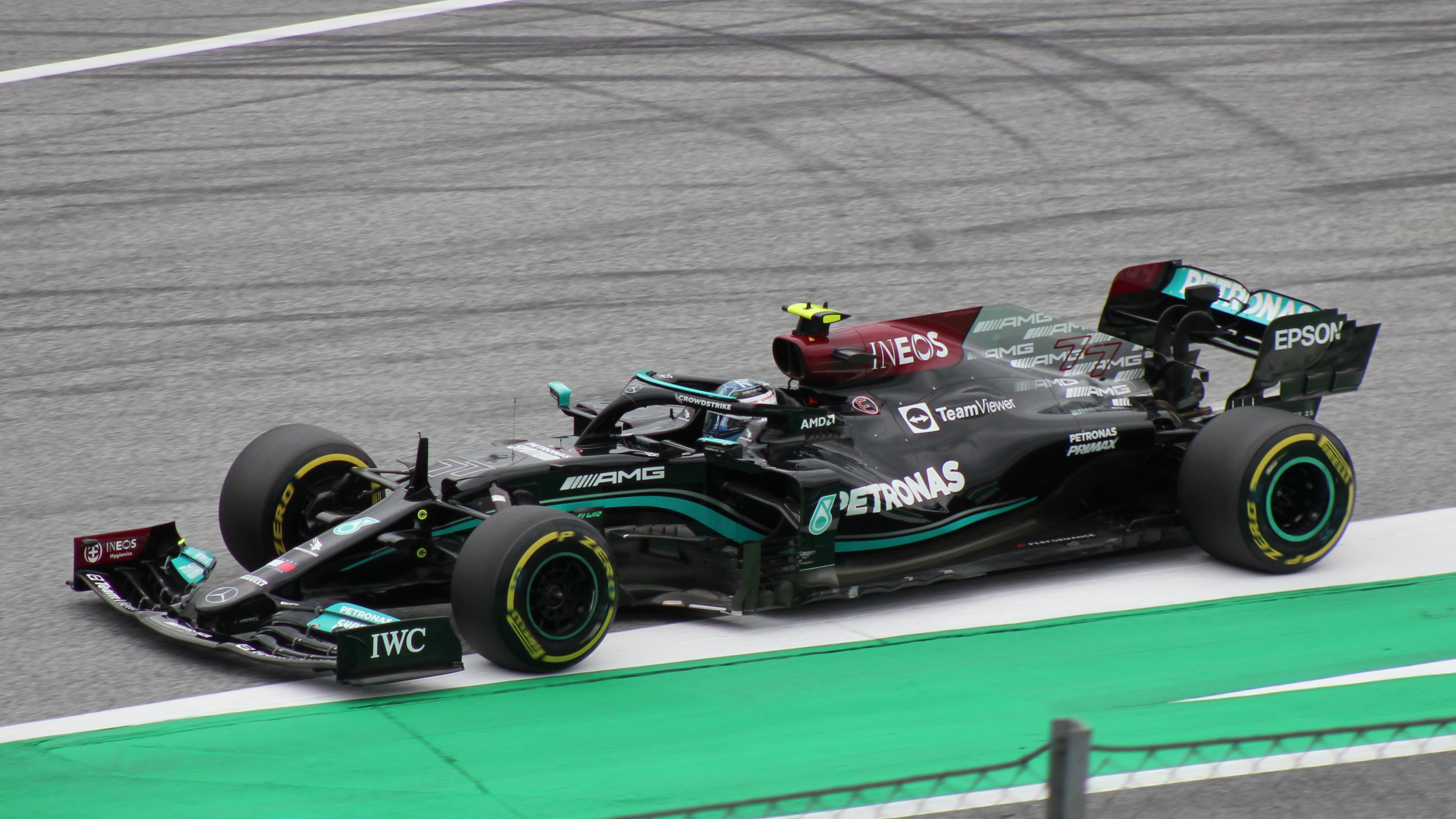
Bottas driving for Mercedes at the 2021 Austrian Grand Prix, in his final season with Mercedes.

Valtteri Bottas is a former GP3 champion. He joined Williams as a test driver in 2010 and remained in the role until the end of the 2012 season, making his race weekend debut at the first practice session for the 2012 Malaysian Grand Prix. On 28 November 2012, it was announced that Bottas would be promoted to a race drive for Williams in 2013, a position he retained for 2014 till 2016. He then moved to Mercedes at the start of the 2017 season and drove for them until the end of 2021, before moving to Alfa Romeo for 2022. He remained at the rebranded Kick Sauber until the end of 2024, before becoming a test driver for Mercedes in 2025. Bottas returned as a full time driver in 2026 for the newly formed Cadillac Formula 1 Team.

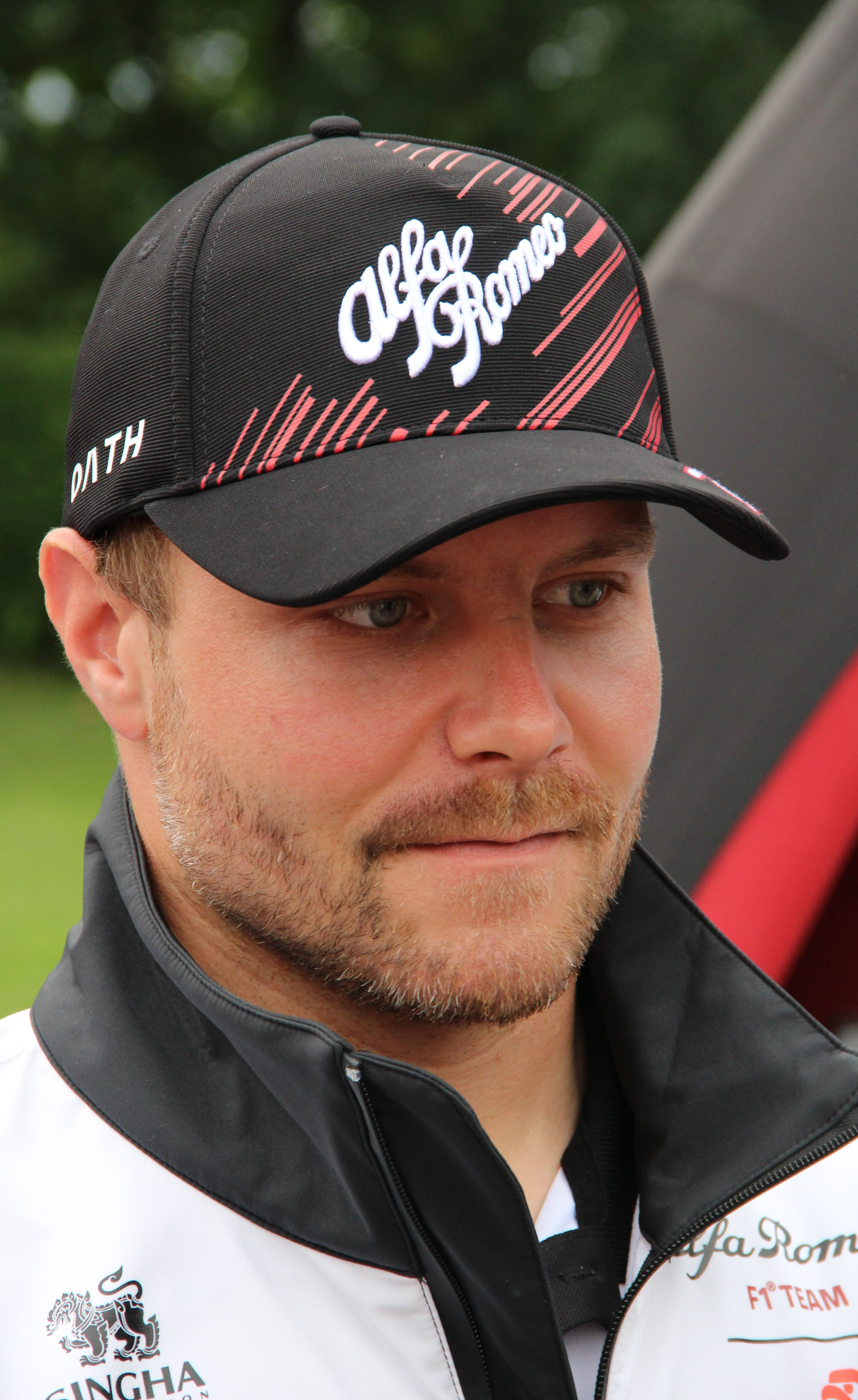
Valtteri Bottas
2026 season position: 23rd

== Former drivers ==
Leo Kinnunen was the first Finnish driver in Formula One. He entered six grand prix in 1974 but was only successful in his qualification for the Swedish Grand Prix, from which he retired eight laps in after an engine failure. Kinnunen was the last Formula One driver to race with an open helmet and goggles.

Mikko Kozarowitzky entered two races in 1977 but failed to qualify for either of them.

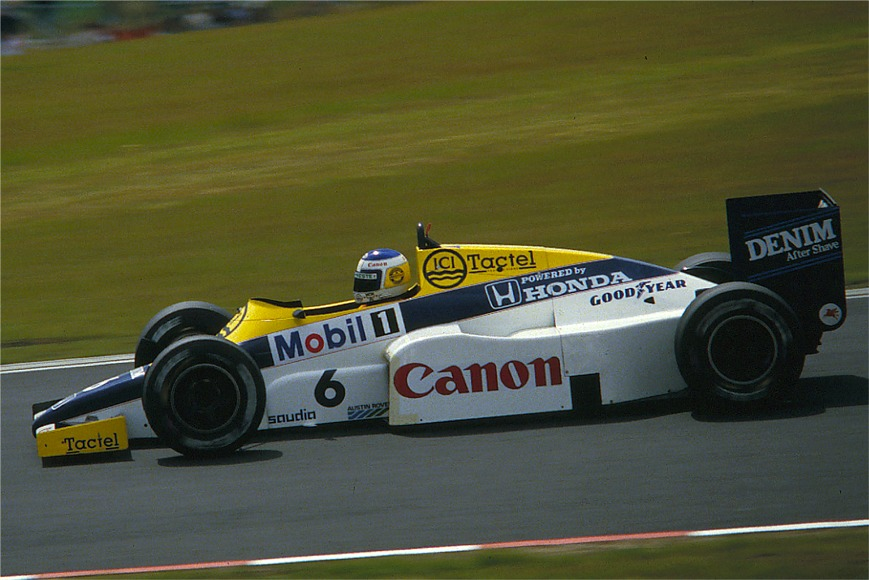
Keke Rosberg in the Williams FW10 in 1985

Keke Rosberg scored his maiden race win in 1982 and, combined with five podium finishes, he also won the Drivers' title. He is one of only two racers to win the championship in a season where he only scored one race victory, the other being Mike Hawthorn. The Autosport survey placed Rosberg in 25th in the top 40 greatest F1 drivers in history. His son and retired driver Nico Rosberg was born in Germany, has German and Finnish citizenship and raced under the German flag.

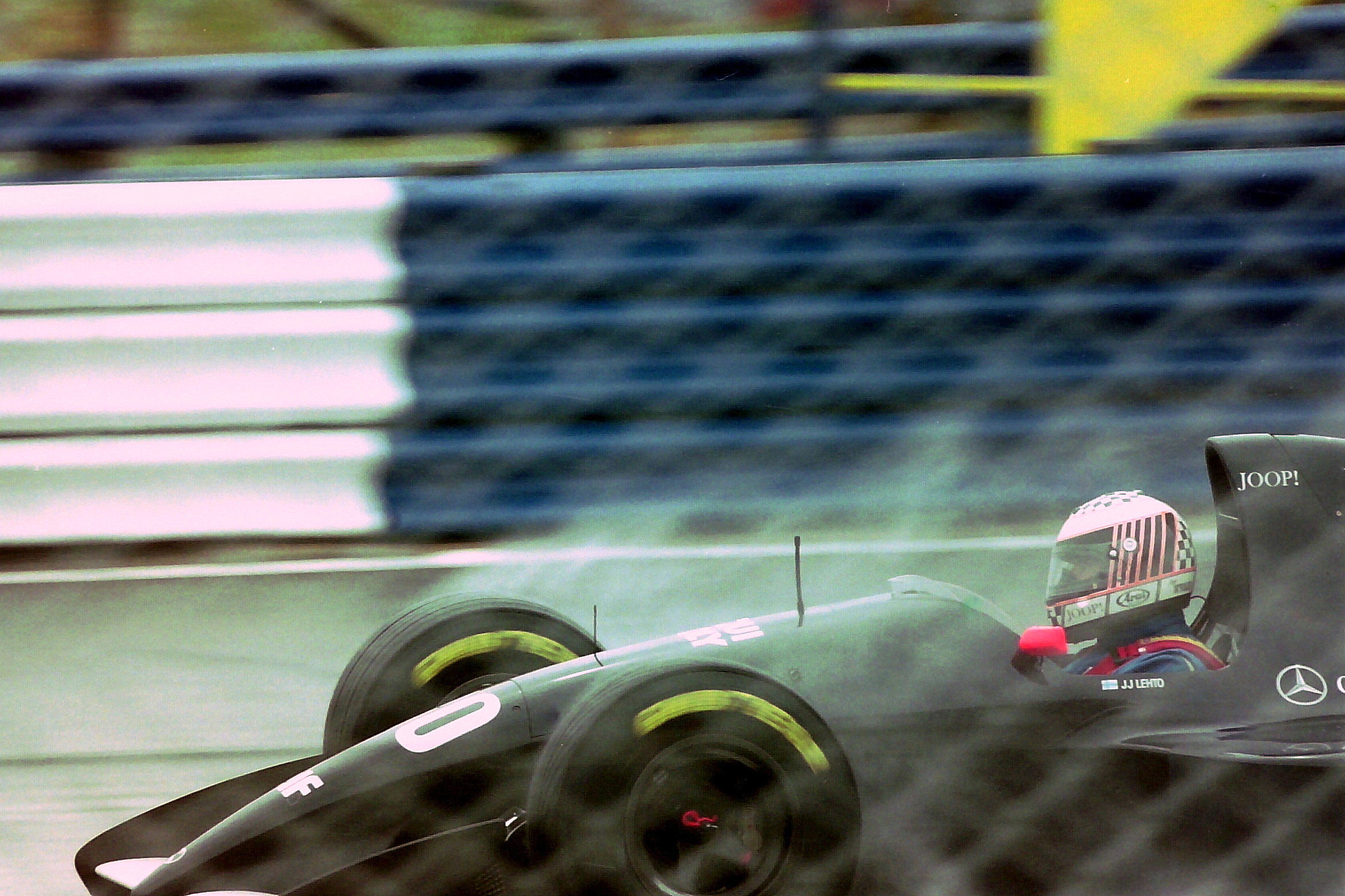
Lehto driving for Sauber at the 1993 British Grand Prix.

JJ Lehto was managed by Keke Rosberg and joined Formula One with Onyx in 1989. He only started two races in the first year and five in his second season, moving to Dallara for 1991. He achieved his career best result of third place but only finished five of the 16 races he started. He left the sport in 1994 and pursued other racing series.

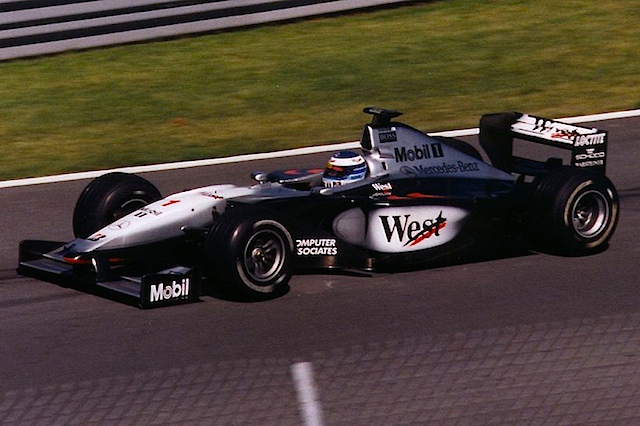
Häkkinen driving for McLaren at the 1999 Canadian Grand Prix, where he drove to his third victory of the season

Mika Häkkinen joined Lotus in 1991 and raced with the team for two seasons. The team was plagued by poor reliability and Häkkinen was only able to finish just over half of the races. He moved to McLaren, initially as a test driver and reserve for Ayrton Senna and Michael Andretti, and was later promoted to the driving seat when Andretti left. On his debut in Portugal, Häkkinen impressed by out-qualifying three-time world champion Senna and was given a permanent seat with the team. He raced with the team for the rest of his career, completing nine more seasons before retiring. However, his career could easily have been cut short at the end of the 1995 season when a crash in the practice sessions for Adelaide took him close to death. An emergency tracheotomy at the circuit saved his life before he was transferred to hospital. During the break between seasons he was able to make an excellent recovery, returning for the first race in 1996. It was not until the final race of the 1997 season that he would score a maiden victory, but that signalled the start of Häkkinen's most successful period in the sport. He became the world champion in 1998 and retained the title the following year. He came close to winning it for a third successive year, finishing second behind Michael Schumacher. After a slightly disappointing 2001 season, during which Häkkinen would visit the podium just three times, he retired from the sport. In the Autosport driver survey Häkkinen was placed as the 15th greatest F1 driver in history, higher than any of his compatriots.

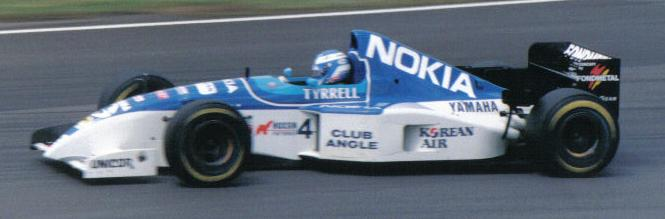
Salo driving for Tyrrell at the 1995 British Grand Prix.

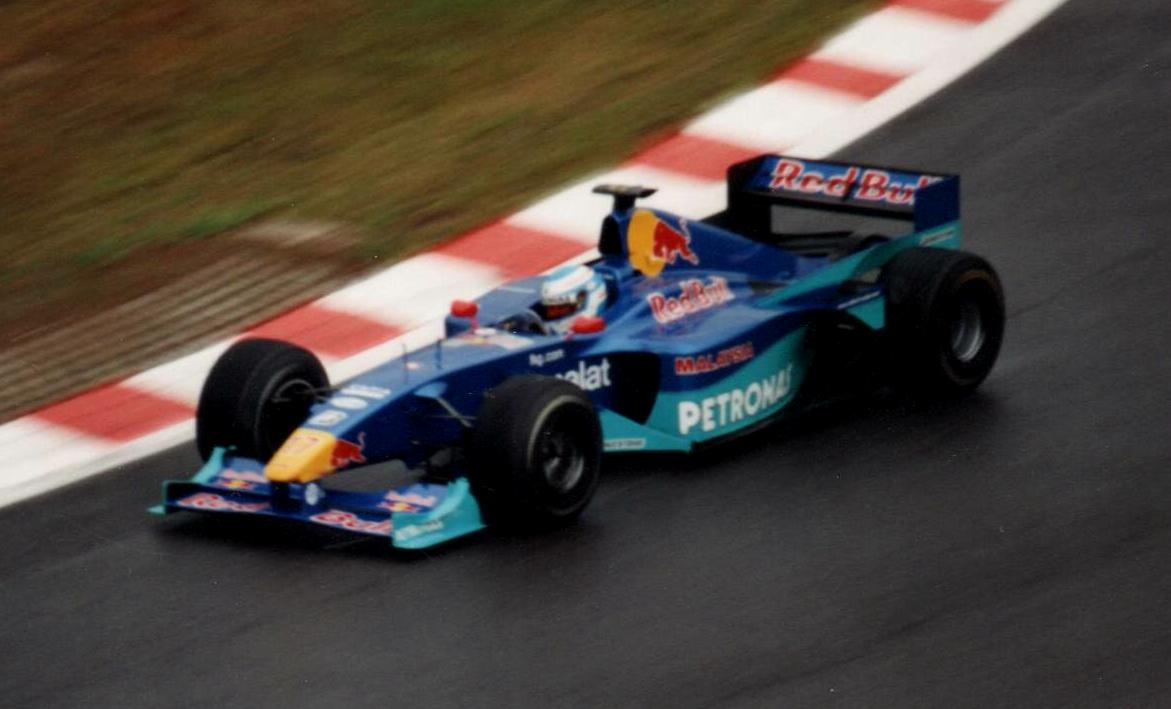
Salo driving for Sauber at the 2000 Belgian Grand Prix

Mika Salo joined the ailing Lotus team for the final two races of the 1994 season. He moved to Tyrrell for three seasons, each year scoring a highest race position of fifth. After spending 1998 with Arrows, Salo had a period where he raced as a stand-in for BAR and Ferrari. It was with Ferrari that Salo, racing instead of an injured Michael Schumacher, could have won the 1999 German Grand Prix had it not been for team orders forcing him to allow teammate Eddie Irvine through to take the victory. He regained a full-time drive in 2000 when he joined the Sauber team, but did not compete in the following year. He returned to lead the Toyota team in 2002 but was bought out of the second year of his contract, ending his Formula One career.

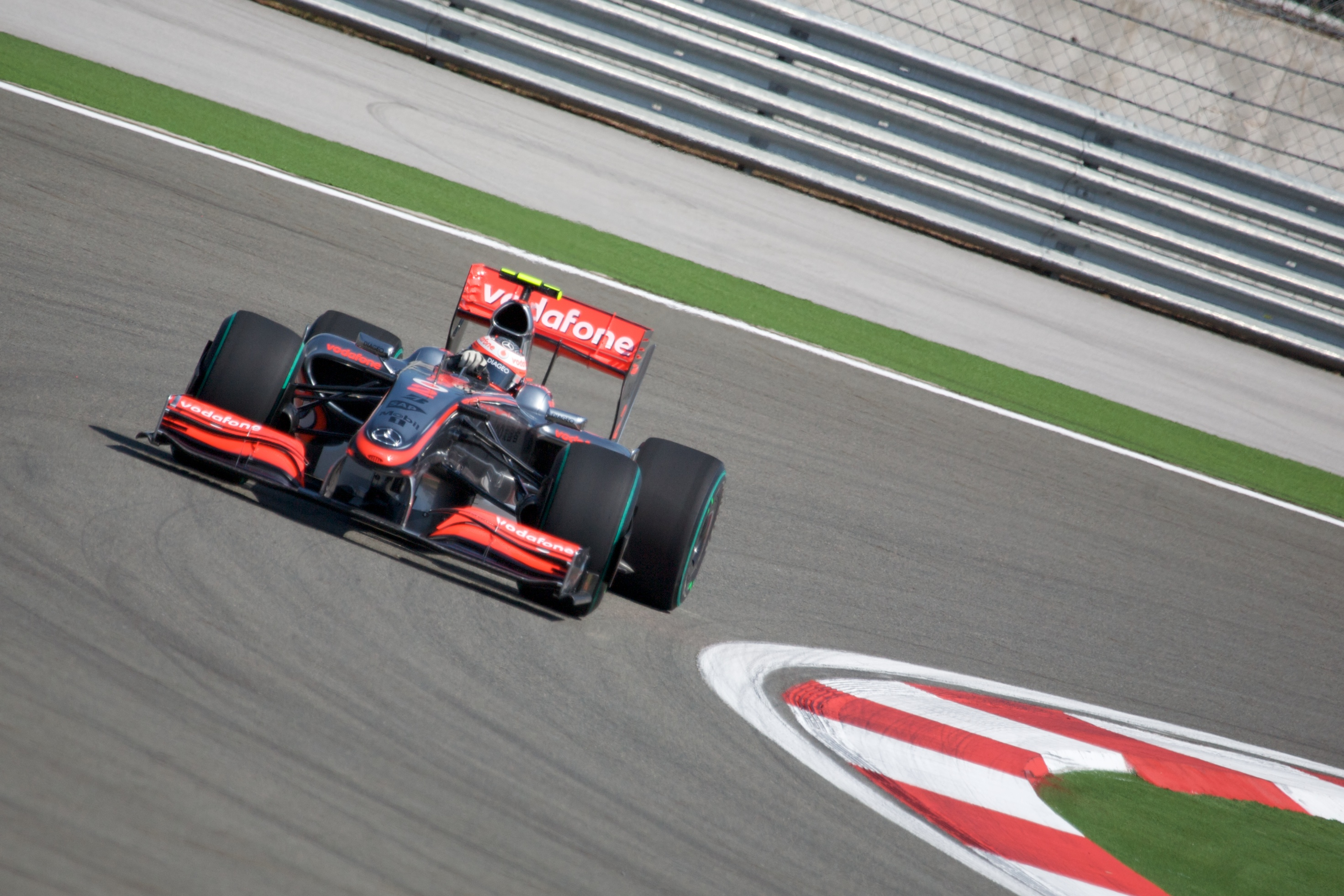
Kovalainen driving for McLaren-Mercedes at the 2009 Turkish Grand Prix

Heikki Kovalainen drove for numerous teams between 2007 and 2013, the highlights of his career being a single pole position and single race victory for McLaren in 2008.

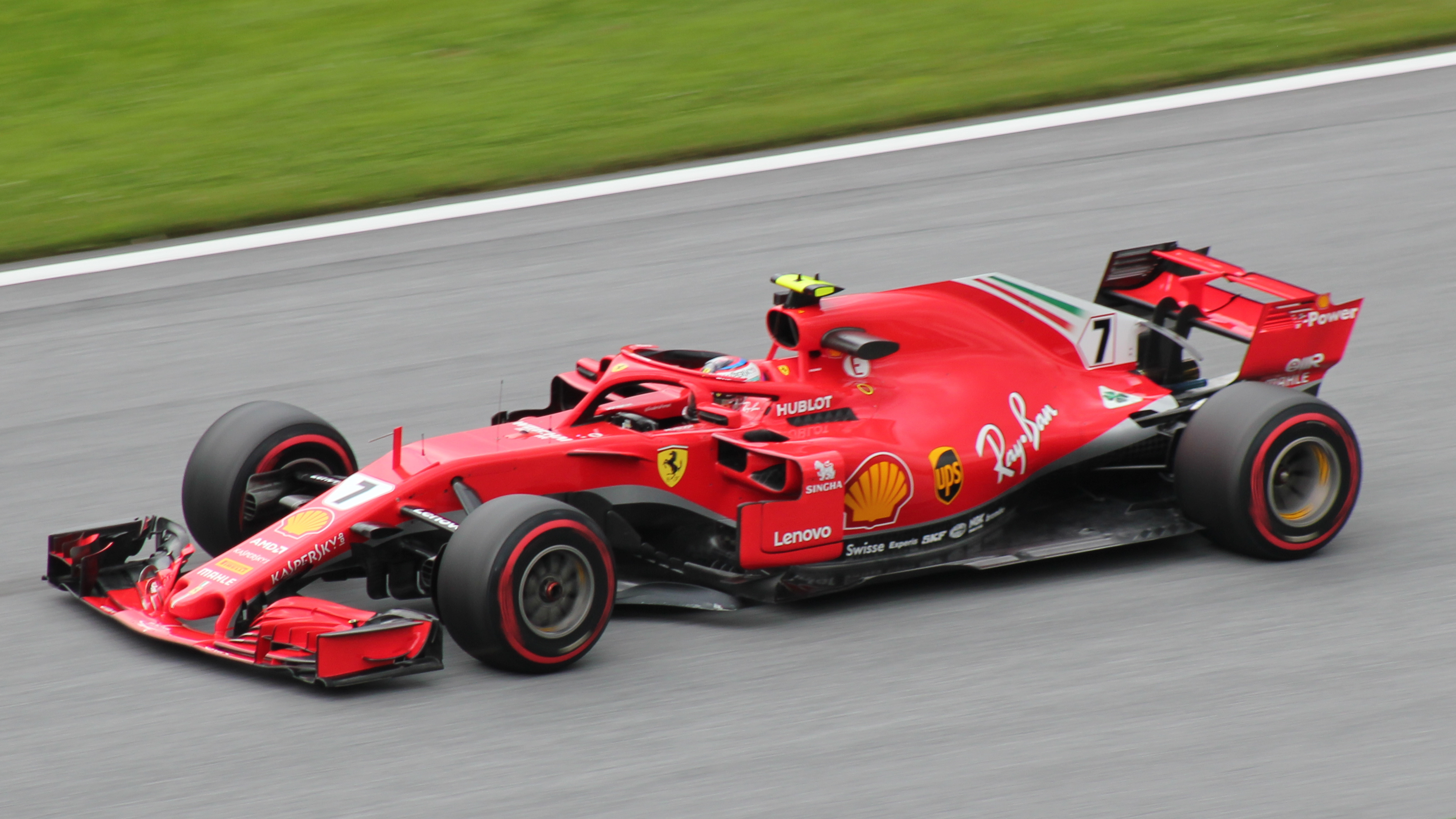
Räikkönen driving for Ferrari at the 2018 Austrian Grand Prix

Kimi Räikkönen made his Formula One debut with Sauber before he secured a seat at McLaren, replacing compatriot Mika Häkkinen. His second season with the team was very successful and Räikkönen took ten podium finishes on the way to second place in the Drivers' Championship. After three further seasons with McLaren, during which he had mixed results, he moved to Ferrari, replacing Michael Schumacher. Räikkönen won the 2007 title, his first year with the team, but he only won three races over the following two years. Ferrari signed Fernando Alonso and released Räikkönen from his contract a year early. He spent two years in other racing categories before returning to Formula One with Lotus in 2012 before moving to Ferrari for the 2014 season, where he stayed until the end of the 2018 season before moving to Alfa Romeo Racing on a two-year contract. An Autosport survey taken by 217 Formula One drivers saw Räikkönen voted as the 22nd greatest F1 driver of all time. Räikkönen retired from Formula One at the end of 2021. He remains the last Ferrari and Finnish driver to win a championship.

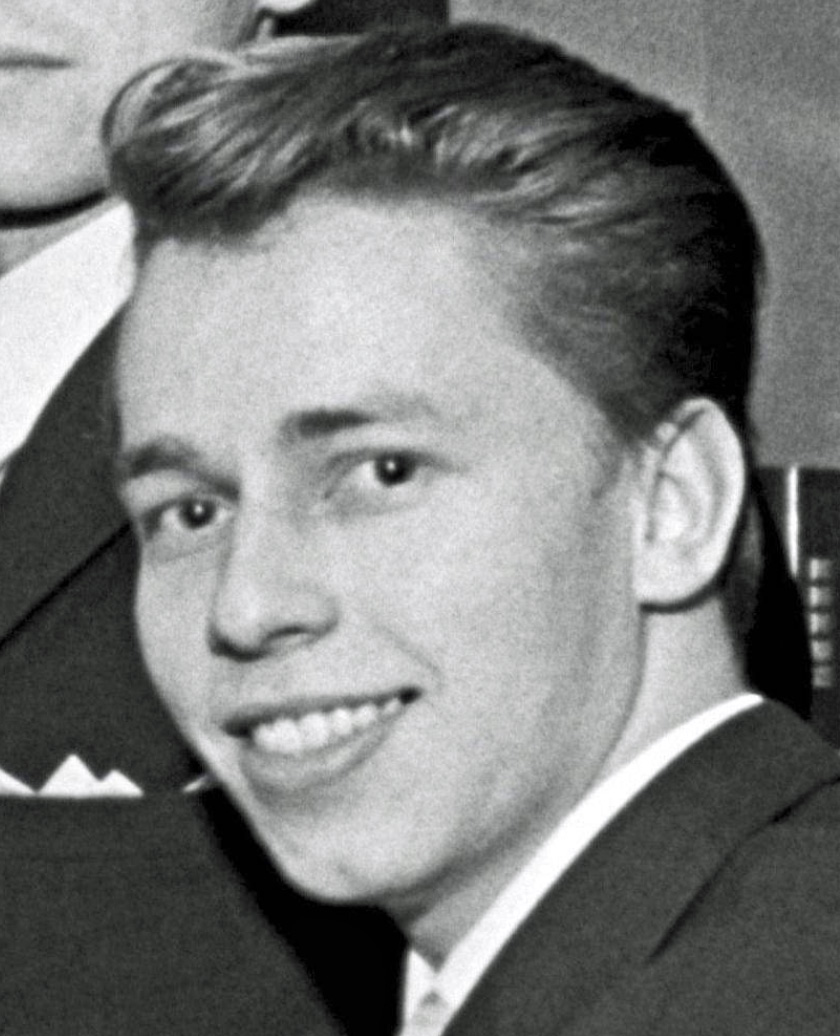
Leo Kinnunen

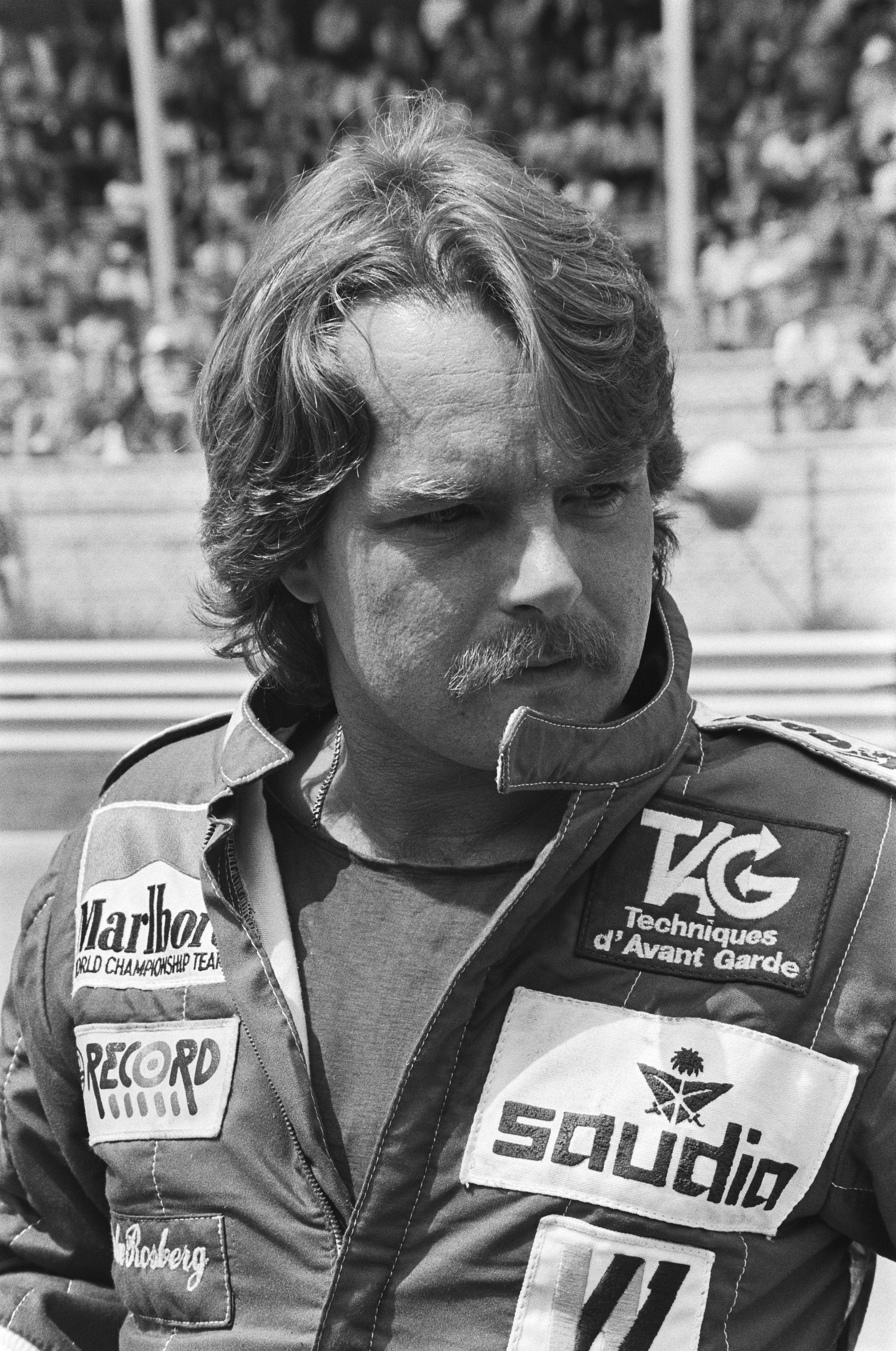
Keke Rosberg

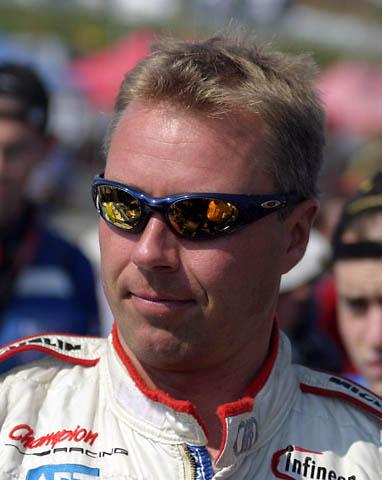
JJ Lehto

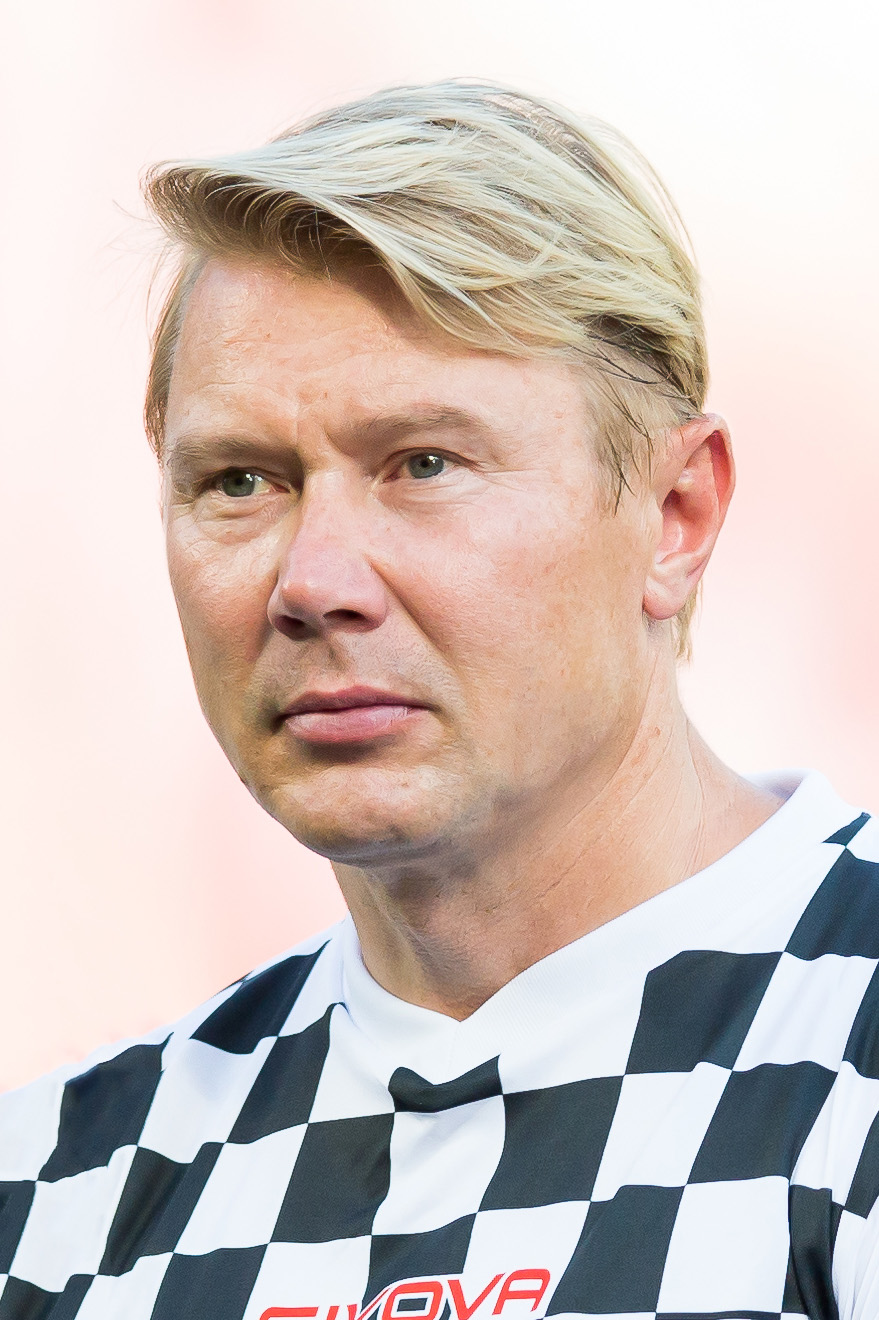
Mika Häkkinen

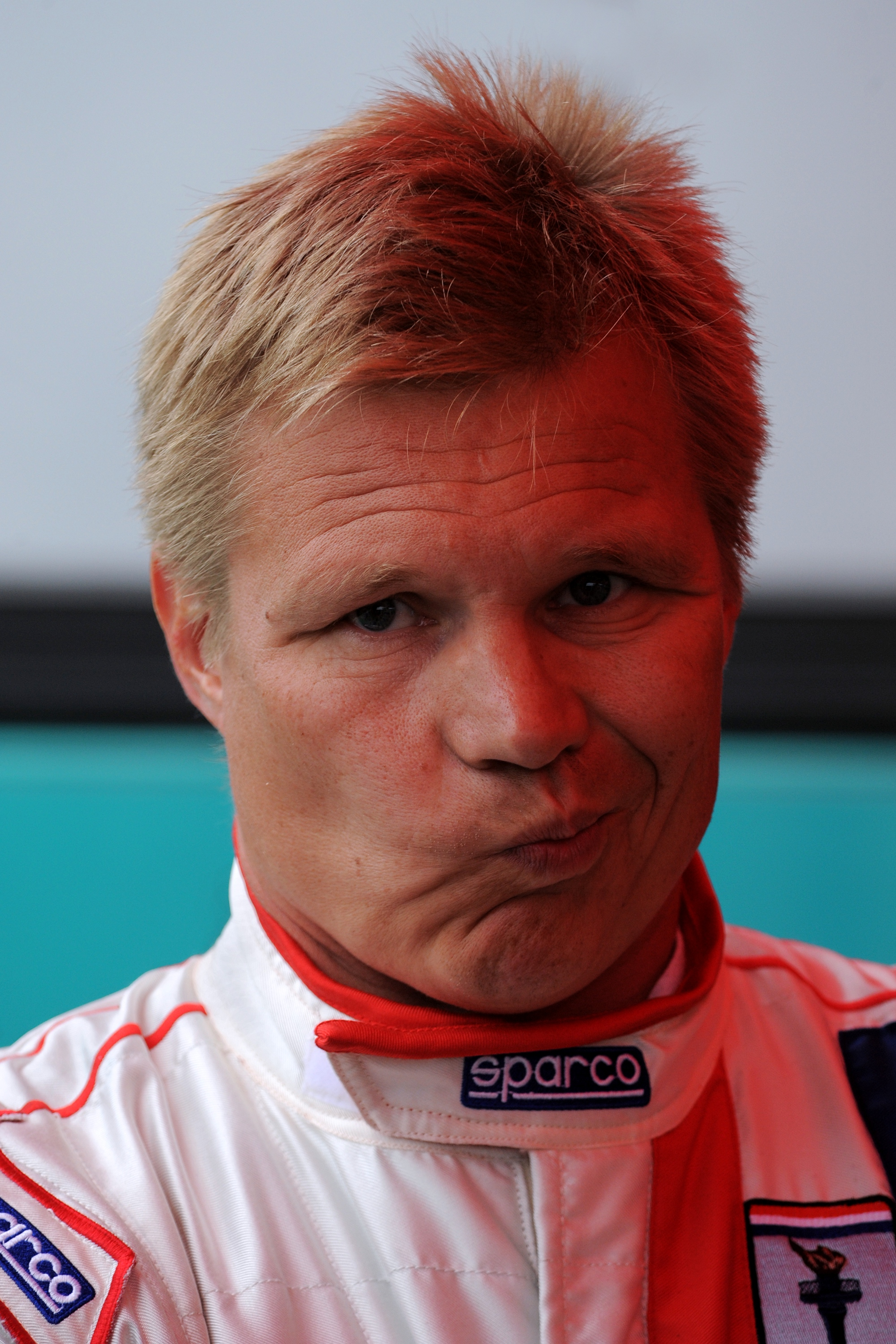
Mika Salo

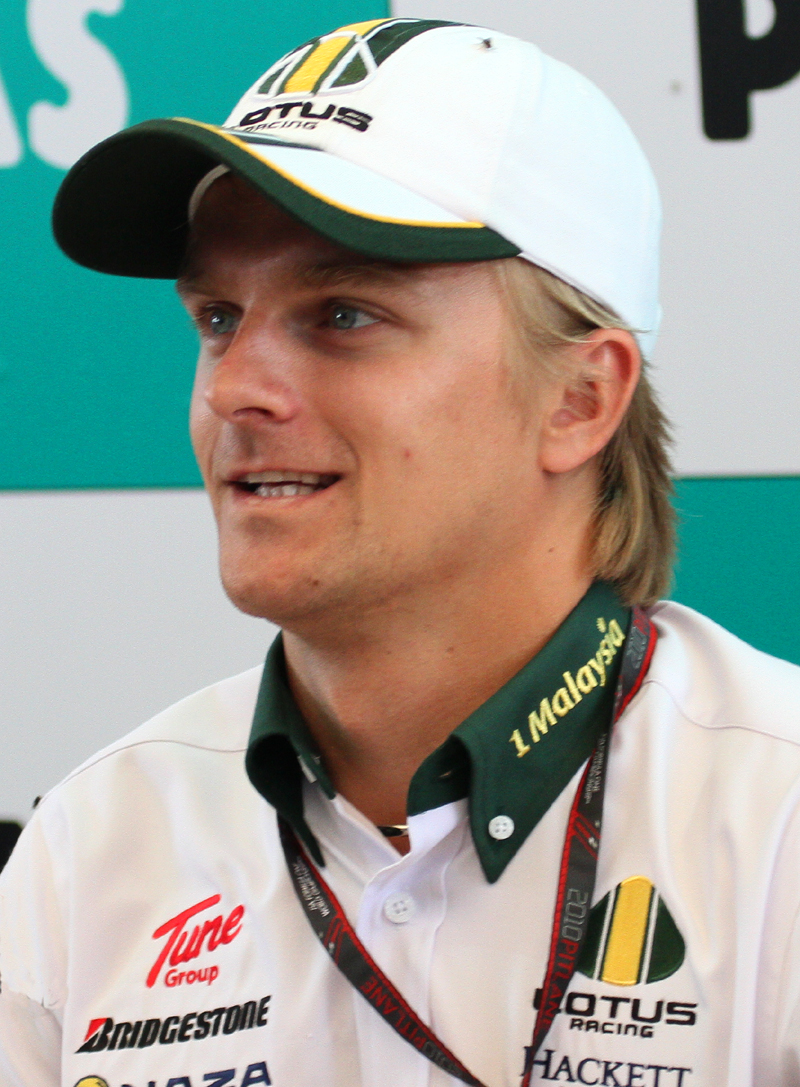
Heikki Kovalainen

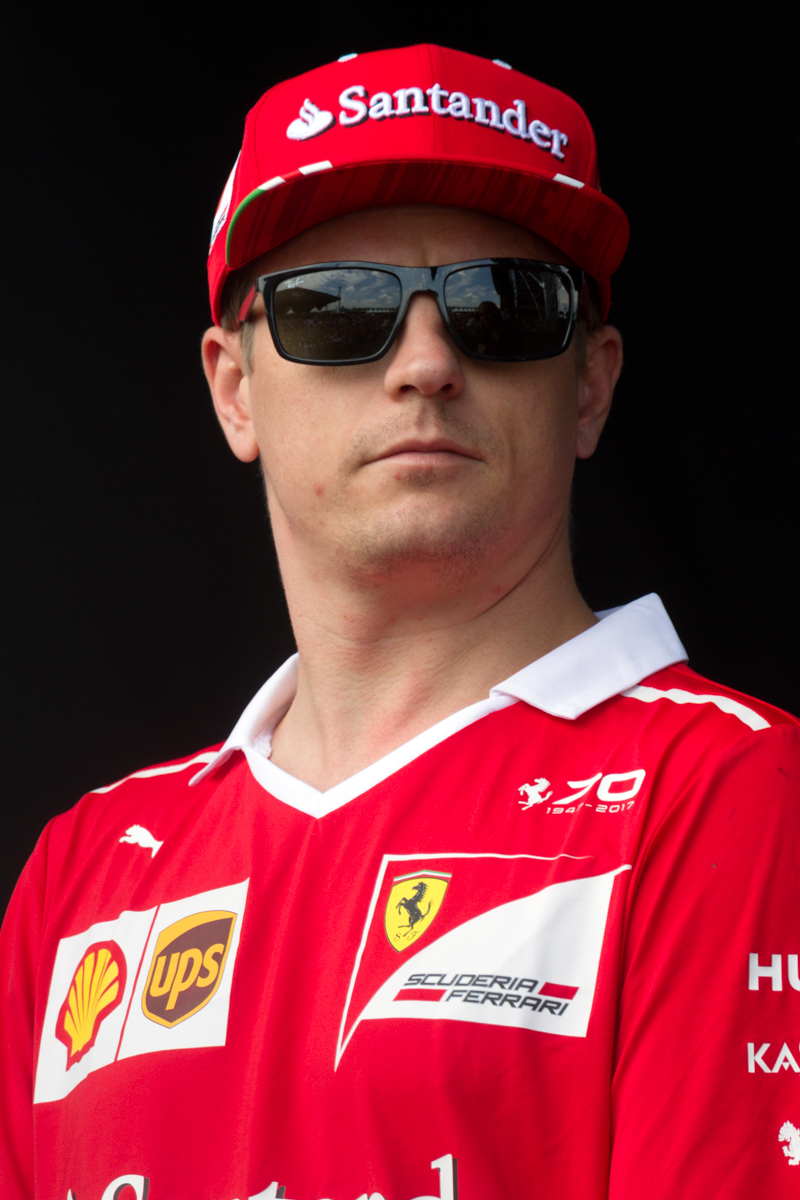
Kimi Räikkönen

== Statistics ==
Drivers	Active Years	Entries	Wins	Podiums	Career Points	Poles	Fastest Laps	Championships
Leo Kinnunen	1974	6 (1 start)	0	0	0	0	0	-
Mikko Kozarowitzky	1977	2 (0 starts)	0	0	0	0	0	-
Keke Rosberg	1978–1986	128 (114 starts)	5	17	159.5	5	3	1 (1982)
JJ Lehto	1989–1994	70 (62 starts)	0	1	10	0	0	-
Mika Häkkinen	1991–2001	165 (161 starts)	20	51	420	26	25	2 (1998, 1999)
Mika Salo	1994–2000, 2002	111 (109 starts)	0	2	33	0	0	-
Heikki Kovalainen	2007–2013	112 (111 starts)	1	4	105	1	2	-
Kimi Räikkönen	2001–2009, 2012–2021	353 (349 starts)	21	103	1873	18	46	1 (2007)
Valtteri Bottas	2013–2024, 2026	266 (265 starts)	10	67	1797	20	19	-

== See also ==
- List of Formula One Grand Prix winners
- List of Formula One drivers
