= 1990 British Formula Three Championship =

British Formula Three racing event in 1990

1990 British Formula 3 International Series

Seasons
- ← 1989 1991 →

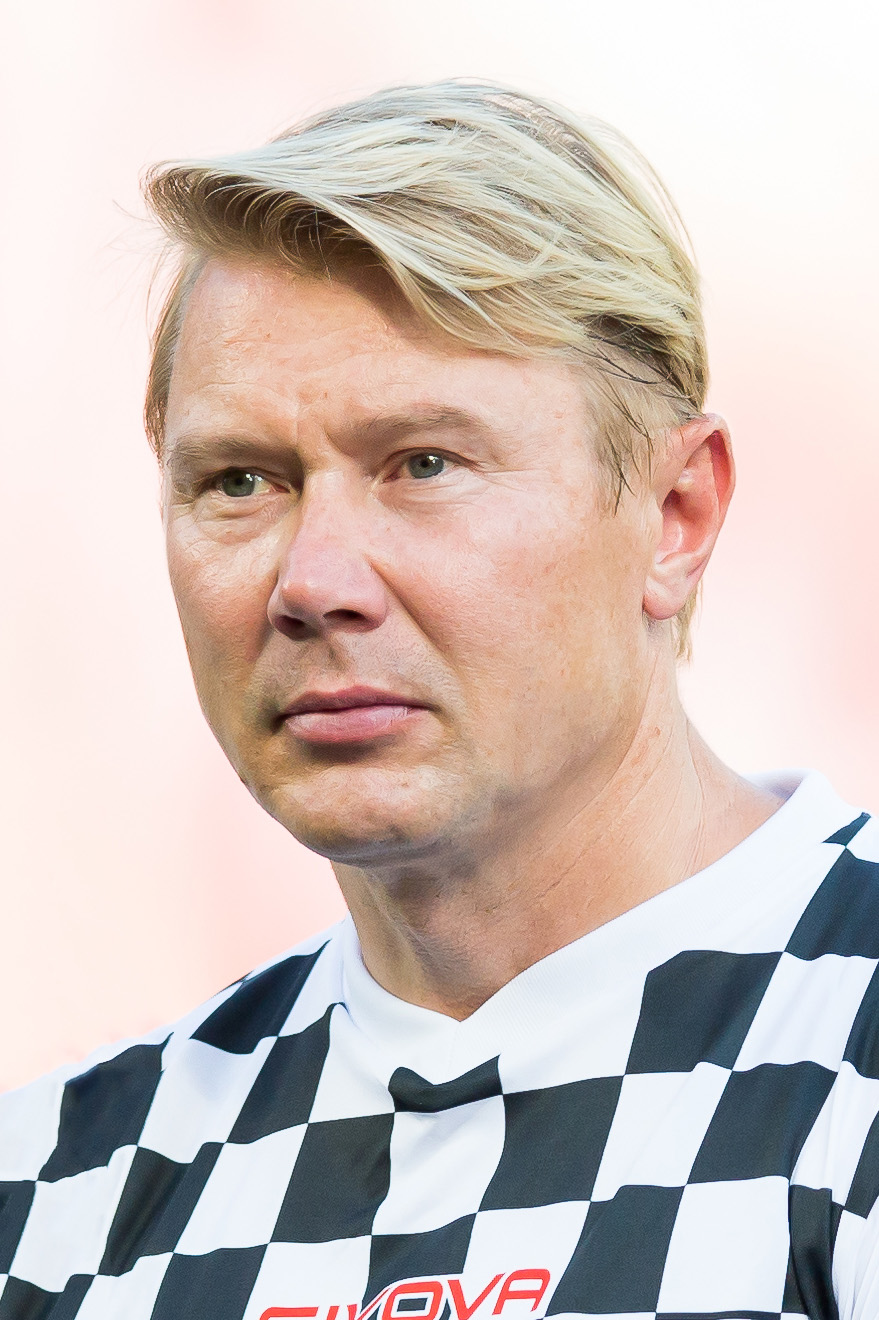
1990 champion, Mika Hakkinen

The 1990 British Formula Three season was the 40th season of the British Formula Three Championship, starting on 1 April at Donington Park and ending on 7 October at Silverstone following 17 races.

The season was notable for its domination by future Formula One champion Mika Häkkinen and fellow Finn and future F1 driver Mika Salo; both drove Mugen-Honda-powered Ralt chassis, prepared by West Surrey Racing and Alan Docking Racing respectively. Häkkinen started the year strongly with three wins from the first four races, but Salo responded with four victories in the next six events to establish an 11-point advantage over his rival. The 11th round of the series at Snetterton proved a turning point, however, as Salo spun out while leading, allowing Häkkinen to begin a sequence of six wins from the final seven rounds which would allow him to seal the title with two rounds to spare.

Häkkinen's reward would be a deal to race with the Lotus F1 team in 1991, although Salo's career momentum was ruined by a drunk-driving charge that forced him to move to Japan to further his career. Other drivers in the field that went on to enjoy success in international motorsport included Christian Fittipaldi, who went on to win the International Formula 3000 championship the following year before enjoying stints in F1 and CART, and future touring car and sportscar driver Peter Kox.

1990 also marked the start of a dominant period for Mugen-Honda engines, which would power each British F3 champion until 2005 with only one exception. Charles Rickett won the Class B title in a year-old Volkswagen-powered Ralt.

The scoring system was 9-6-4-3-2-1 points awarded to the first six finishers, with 1 (one) extra point added to the driver who set the fastest lap of the race.

== Drivers and Teams ==
Team	Chassis	Engine	No.	Driver	Rounds
Class A
Bowman Racing	Ralt RT33	Volkswagen-Spiess	1	(United Kingdom) Steve Robertson	All
Bowman Racing	Ralt RT33	Volkswagen-Spiess	4	(Belgium) Philippe Adams	All
Bowman Racing	Ralt RT33	Volkswagen-Spiess	12	(Mexico) Fernando Plata	1–7
Bowman Racing	Ralt RT33	Volkswagen-Spiess	12	(United Kingdom) Stephen Hepworth	10–17
Bowman Racing	Ralt RT33	Volkswagen-Spiess	14	(Netherlands) Peter Kox	1–10, 12–17
West Surrey Racing	Ralt RT34	Mugen-Honda	2	(Finland) Mika Häkkinen	All
West Surrey Racing	Ralt RT34	Mugen-Honda	3	(Brazil) Christian Fittipaldi	All
West Surrey Racing	Ralt RT34	Mugen-Honda	16	(Japan) Minoru Tanaka	All
Paul Stewart Racing	Reynard 903	Mugen-Honda	5	(United Kingdom) Paul Stewart	1–3
Paul Stewart Racing	Ralt RT34	Mugen-Honda	5	(United Kingdom) Paul Stewart	4–17
Paul Stewart Racing	Reynard 903	Mugen-Honda	6	(Republic of Ireland) Derek Higgins	1–4
Paul Stewart Racing	Ralt RT34	Mugen-Honda	6	(Republic of Ireland) Derek Higgins	5–17
Alan Docking Racing	Ralt RT34	Mugen-Honda	7	(Finland) Mika Salo	All
Alan Docking Racing	Ralt RT34	Mugen-Honda	8	(Japan) Hideki Noda	All
Swallow Racing	Reynard 903	Mugen-Honda	10	(United Kingdom) Julian Westwood	1–4
Swallow Racing	Ralt RT34	Mugen-Honda	10	(United Kingdom) Julian Westwood	5–17
Swallow Racing	Reynard 903	Mugen-Honda	11	(United Kingdom) Jonathan McGall	1–3
Swallow Racing	Ralt RT34	Mugen-Honda	11	(United Kingdom) Jonathan McGall	4–17
Formula Services	Reynard 903	Alfa Romeo	18	(Brazil) Jose Cordova	1–4
Formula Services	Reynard 903	Alfa Romeo	18	(Mexico) Adrián Fernández	5
Hubbard Racing	Reynard 903	Opel	20	(South Africa) Hilton Cowie	5–9, 13–15, 17
Hubbard Racing	Ralt RT33	Opel	94	(South Africa) Hilton Cowie	3
Hubbard Racing	Ralt RT33	Opel	21	(Brazil) Niko Palhares	3–4
Hubbard Racing	Ralt RT34	Opel	21	(Brazil) Niko Palhares	5–9
Racefax Motorsport	Ralt RT32	Mazda	23	(Switzerland) Alain Menu	1–2, 4
Dawson Auto Developments	Reynard 903	Alfa Romeo	25	(Portugal) António Simões	2–3, 5, 10–11, 13, 17
Tech-Speed Motorsport	Reynard 903	Volkswagen-Spiess	27	(United Kingdom) Gary Ayles	1–4, 6–9
Tech-Speed Motorsport	Reynard 903	Volkswagen-Spiess	27	(United Kingdom) Scott Stringfellow	13
Tech-Speed Motorsport	Reynard 903	Volkswagen-Spiess	28	(Spain) Jordi Gené	All
Hepworth Racing	Reynard 903	Volkswagen-Spiess	30	(United Kingdom) Stephen Hepworth	1–6
Hepworth Racing	Reynard 903	Volkswagen-Spiess	30	(United Kingdom) Jason Elliott	9–10
Hepworth Racing	Reynard 903	Volkswagen-Spiess	30	(Denmark) Henrik Larsen	11–14
Hepworth Racing	Reynard 903	Volkswagen-Spiess	30	(United Kingdom) Ross Hockenhull	16
Superpower Engineering	Reynard 903	Volkswagen-Spiess	33	(United Kingdom) Paul Warwick	1
Superpower Engineering	Ralt RT34	Mugen-Honda	33	(United Kingdom) Paul Warwick	2–9
Superpower Engineering	Ralt RT34	Mugen-Honda	33	(Republic of Ireland) Bernard Dolan	10
Superpower Engineering	Ralt RT34	Mugen-Honda	33	(United Kingdom) Gary Ayles	11–17
Team Itchi-Ban	Reynard 903	Mugen-Honda	37	(Sweden) Nic Jönsson	15–16
Team Itchi-Ban	Reynard 903	Mugen-Honda	38	(Sweden) Mikael Gustavsson	15
Team Itchi-Ban	Reynard 903	Mugen-Honda	39	(Sweden) Linus Lundberg	15
G-Son Racing	Reynard 903	Volkswagen-Spiess	40	(Sweden) Fredrik Ekblom	1
Diamond Racing	Reynard 903	Volkswagen-Spiess	44	(Mexico) César Tiberio Jiménez	4
Reynard R&D	Reynard 903B	Mugen-Honda	50	(United Kingdom) Jason Elliott	11, 13, 15–17
Class B
Peter Lea Racing	Reynard 873	Alfa Romeo	51	(United Kingdom) Eddie Kimbell	1–13
Peter Lea Racing	Reynard 873	Alfa Romeo	51	(United States) Sandy Brody	14–17
Peter Lea Racing	Reynard 883	Alfa Romeo	56	(United Kingdom) Alan Tulloch	1–10, 13–17
Stronghold Racing	Ralt RT32	Toyota	52	(United Kingdom) Steve Bradley	1–4, 6, 8–11, 14
Stronghold Racing	Ralt RT33	Volkswagen-Spiess	52	(United Kingdom) Steve Bradley	15, 17
Steve Deeks	Reynard 883	Alfa Romeo	53	(United Kingdom) Steve Deeks	5–8, 10, 17
Bowman Racing	Ralt RT33	Volkswagen-Spiess	54	(United Kingdom) Charles Rickett	1–13
Bowman Racing	Ralt RT33	Volkswagen-Spiess	54	(Hong Kong) Darren Shaw	14, 16
Bowman Racing	Ralt RT33	Volkswagen-Spiess	54	(United States) Dana Brewer	15, 17
Tollbar Racing	Ralt RT32	Volkswagen-Spiess	55	(Spain) Juan Serda	All
Davies Racing	Ralt RT31	Volkswagen-Spiess	57	(United Kingdom) Tony Davies	1, 4–6, 10, 17
Tech-Speed Motorsport	Reynard 873	Volkswagen-Spiess	58	(United Kingdom) Paul Smith	10
G-Son Racing	Reynard 883	Volkswagen-Spiess	60	(Sweden) Monica Stråth	1
Racefax Motorsport	Ralt RT32	Volkswagen-Spiess	61	(United Kingdom) Dominic Chappell	1–3
Racefax Motorsport	Ralt RT33	Volkswagen-Spiess	61	(United Kingdom) Dominic Chappell	4–17
Hubbard Racing	Reynard 893	Volkswagen-Spiess	64	(Finland) Pekka Herva	14–15, 17
Hubbard Racing	Ralt RT33	Opel	91	(Switzerland) Flurin Zegg	4
Zeus Motorsport	Reynard 883	Volkswagen-Spiess	66	(United Kingdom) Peter Sneller	1–2, 4–8, 10–12, 15–17
Petroglobe International	Reynard 893	Alfa Romeo	67	(United States) Dana Brewer	13
Diamond Racing	Reynard 893	Toyota	70	(Mexico) César Tiberio Jiménez	3
Cram Motorsport	Ralt RT33	Toyota	71	(United Kingdom) Rob Mears	All
JWD Motorsport	Ralt RT31	Toyota	83	(United States) Jack Dickenson	4, 9
Carlton Tingling	Reynard 883	Volkswagen-Spiess	85	(Jamaica) Carlton Tingling	15

== Race calendar and results ==
Round	Circuit	Date	Pole position	Fastest lap	Winning driver	Winning team	Class B winner
1	Donington Park	1 April	(Finland) Mika Häkkinen	(Finland) Mika Häkkinen	(Finland) Mika Häkkinen	(United Kingdom) West Surrey Racing	(United Kingdom) Dominic Chappell
2	Silverstone	8 April	(Finland) Mika Häkkinen	(Finland) Mika Salo	(Finland) Mika Salo	(United Kingdom) Alan Docking Racing	(United Kingdom) Charles Rickett
3	Thruxton	16 April	(Finland) Mika Häkkinen	(Finland) Mika Häkkinen	(Finland) Mika Häkkinen	(United Kingdom) West Surrey Racing	(United Kingdom) Charles Rickett
4	Brands Hatch	29 April	(Finland) Mika Häkkinen	(Finland) Mika Häkkinen	(Finland) Mika Häkkinen	(United Kingdom) West Surrey Racing	(United Kingdom) Charles Rickett
5	Silverstone	7 May	(Finland) Mika Salo	(Finland) Mika Salo	(Finland) Mika Salo	(United Kingdom) Alan Docking Racing	(Spain) Juan Serda
6	Brands Hatch	20 May	(Finland) Mika Häkkinen	(Finland) Mika Häkkinen	(Finland) Mika Salo	(United Kingdom) Alan Docking Racing	(United Kingdom) Dominic Chappell
7	Thruxton	28 May	(Finland) Mika Salo	(Finland) Mika Häkkinen	(Finland) Mika Salo	(United Kingdom) Alan Docking Racing	(United Kingdom) Charles Rickett
8	Silverstone	10 June	(Finland) Mika Häkkinen	(Finland) Mika Salo	(United Kingdom) Steve Robertson	(United Kingdom) Bowman Racing	(United Kingdom) Charles Rickett
9	Donington Park	1 July	(Brazil) Christian Fittipaldi	(Brazil) Christian Fittipaldi	(Brazil) Christian Fittipaldi	(United Kingdom) West Surrey Racing	(United Kingdom) Charles Rickett
10	Silverstone	14 July	(Finland) Mika Salo	(Finland) Mika Salo	(Finland) Mika Salo	(United Kingdom) Alan Docking Racing	(United Kingdom) Charles Rickett
11	Snetterton	5 August	(Finland) Mika Salo	(Finland) Mika Häkkinen (Finland) Mika Salo^{1}	(Finland) Mika Häkkinen	(United Kingdom) West Surrey Racing	(United Kingdom) Charles Rickett
12	Oulton Park	12 August	(Finland) Mika Häkkinen	(Finland) Mika Häkkinen	(Finland) Mika Häkkinen	(United Kingdom) West Surrey Racing	(United Kingdom) Charles Rickett
13	Silverstone	27 August	(Finland) Mika Häkkinen	(Finland) Mika Häkkinen	(Finland) Mika Häkkinen	(United Kingdom) West Surrey Racing	(United Kingdom) Charles Rickett
14	Brands Hatch	2 September	(Finland) Mika Häkkinen	(Finland) Mika Häkkinen	(Finland) Mika Häkkinen	(United Kingdom) West Surrey Racing	(Hong Kong) Darren Shaw
15	Donington Park	16 September	(Finland) Mika Häkkinen	(Finland) Mika Häkkinen	(Finland) Mika Häkkinen	(United Kingdom) West Surrey Racing	(United Kingdom) Dominic Chappell
16	Thruxton	23 September	(United Kingdom) Paul Stewart	(Finland) Mika Salo	(Finland) Mika Salo	(United Kingdom) Alan Docking Racing	(Hong Kong) Darren Shaw
17	Silverstone	7 October	(Finland) Mika Häkkinen	(United Kingdom) Steve Robertson	(Finland) Mika Häkkinen	(United Kingdom) West Surrey Racing	(United Kingdom) Peter Sneller

^1 Häkkinen and Salo set identical fastest lap times and were subsequently both awarded an additional point.

== Championship Standings ==
Points in brackets include dropped scores – only the best 14 of 17 scores count towards the championship

Pos.	Driver	DON	SIL	THR	BRH	SIL	BRH	THR	SIL	DON	SIL	SNE	OUL	SIL	BRH	DON	THR	SIL	Pts
Class A
1	(Finland) Mika Häkkinen	1	(3)	1	1	2	2	2	Ret	(6)	2	1	1	1	1	1	2	1	121
2	(Finland) Mika Salo	2	1	2	4	1	1	1	2	5	1	(7)	2	2	Ret	3	1	Ret	98
3	(United Kingdom) Steve Robertson	3	2	Ret	Ret	3	3	Ret	1	Ret	3	2	Ret	4	3	Ret	9	3	49
4	(Brazil) Christian Fittipaldi	4	14	5	6	7	6	4	8	1	6	3	Ret	DSQ	5	Ret	4	2	36
5	(Netherlands) Peter Kox	Ret	4	3	2	5	Ret	6	5	2	Ret		Ret	Ret	Ret	Ret	6	4	28
6	(Belgium) Philippe Adams	11	Ret	6	10	4	20	Ret	9	9	4	4	5	6	2	2	Ret	11	25
7	(United Kingdom) Paul Stewart	6	23	Ret	11	9	Ret	13	4	4	Ret	5	4	3	6	Ret	3	13	21
8	(United Kingdom) Jonathan McGall	Ret	5	Ret	12	10	11	5	3	7	10	17	3	7	7	Ret	Ret	6	13
9	(Republic of Ireland) Derek Higgins	Ret	7	Ret	5	8	4	9	22	3	Ret	Ret	Ret	Ret	4	Ret	Ret	7	12
10	(United Kingdom) Paul Warwick	17	Ret	4	3	Ret	5	7	6	10									10
11	(Japan) Minoru Tanaka	5	8	Ret	8	13	Ret	3	Ret	Ret	5	Ret	Ret	10	12	Ret	5	8	10
12	(Japan) Hideki Noda	7	6	Ret	DNS	6	9	11	16	Ret	Ret	Ret	6	5	11	4	10	Ret	8
13	(United Kingdom) Jason Elliott									Ret	8	DNS		20		5	8	5	4
14	(United Kingdom) Julian Westwood	Ret	12	8	9	14	7	10	7	8	7	Ret	7	8	9	6	7	10	1
15	(Spain) Jordi Gené	10	10	9	13	12	Ret	DSQ	10	Ret	11	6	8	9	10	7	Ret	9	1
16	(Mexico) Fernando Plata	8	9	7	7	11	8	12											0
17	(United Kingdom) Gary Ayles	20	Ret	11	14		Ret	8	14	Ret		Ret	Ret	Ret	8	8	19	12	0
18	(Denmark) Henrik Larsen											8	Ret	11	13				0
19	(United Kingdom) Stephen Hepworth	13	16	15	Ret	15	12				Ret	9	9	Ret	14	15	20	Ret	0
20	(Switzerland) Alain Menu	9	Ret		DNS														0
21	(Republic of Ireland) Bernard Dolan										9								0
22	(Brazil) Niko Palhares			Ret	Ret	Ret	10	NC	11	Ret									0
23	(Brazil) Jose Cordova	DNS	11	10	DNS														0
24	(Portugal) António Simões		13	Ret		Ret					12	10		Ret				Ret	0
25	(South Africa) Hilton Cowie			12		Ret	Ret	DSQ	12	11				12	Ret	Ret		Ret	0
26	(United Kingdom) Ross Hockenhull																11		0
27	(Sweden) Nic Jönsson															Ret	13		0
28	(United Kingdom) Scott Stringfellow													15					0
	(Sweden) Fredrik Ekblom	Ret																	0
	(Mexico) Adrián Fernández					Ret													0
	(Sweden) Linus Lundberg															Ret			0
	(Mexico) César T. Jiménez				DNS														0
	(Sweden) Mikael Gustavsson																DNS		0
Class B
1	(United Kingdom) Charles Rickett	Ret	15	13	15	Ret	21	14	13	12	13	11	10	13					101
2	(United Kingdom) Dominic Chappell	12	19	DNS	Ret	Ret	13	15	15	Ret	15	Ret	11	14	16	9	14	Ret	72
3	(United Kingdom) Eddie Kimbell	Ret	18	14	16	17	16	17	19	15	Ret	12	DNS	16					43
4	(United Kingdom) Rob Mears	18	Ret	16	Ret	Ret	14	Ret	18	13	16	14	Ret	Ret	17	10	15	DSQ	42
5	(United Kingdom) Peter Sneller	Ret	17		DNS	Ret	15	16	Ret		14	15	12			DSQ	16	14	39
6	(Spain) Juan Serda	16	20	20	17	16	18	18	21	16	20	16	13	18	20	DSQ	18	18	33
7	(United Kingdom) Steve Bradley	DSQ	21	18	Ret		17		20	14	19	13			19	12		16	23
8	(Hong Kong) Darren Shaw														15		12		20
9	(United Kingdom) Alan Tulloch	15	22	19	18	18	19	19	Ret	Ret	21			17	21	11	Ret	Ret	20
10	(United States) Sandy Brody														Ret	Ret	17	15	8
11	(United Kingdom) Steve Deeks					Ret	DNS	DNS	17		18							17	8
12	(Sweden) Monica Stråth	14																	6
13	(United Kingdom) Tony Davies	19			19	19	22				22							DNS	6
14	(Finland) Pekka Herva														18	Ret		Ret	4
15	(Mexico) César T. Jiménez			17															3
16	(United States) Dana Brewer													19		14		19	3
17	(United Kingdom) Paul Smith										17								2
18	(Jamaica) Carlton Tingling															13			2
19	(United States) Jack Dickenson				DNS					17									1
	(Switzerland) Flurin Zegg				DNS														0
