= Charles Rickett =

British former racing driver (born 1963)

Charles Michael Rickett (born 13 June 1963) is a British former racing driver.

Rickett was born in London and educated at Stowe School. In 1998, he co-founded V12 Telecom, suppliers of telecommunications services to UK businesses (Voice & Data, SIP, VoIP, Audio & Video Conferencing, High Speed Internet Access, Mobile & SMS).

Rickett competed in the British Formula 3 Championship from 1988 to 1990, winning the 1990 British Formula Three season National class with ten wins, 13 pole positions and three lap records. A three time competitor in 24 Hours of Le Mans: 1991 (Chamberlain Engineering, Spice Engineering, DNF), 1992 (Kremer Racing, Porsche 962, 11th) and 1994 (Bristow Motorsport, Porsche 911 Carrera RSR, DNF). He was elected to the British Racing Drivers' Club in 1994.

== See also ==
- 1991 24 Hours of Le Mans
- 1992 24 Hours of Le Mans
- 1994 24 Hours of Le Mans
- 1990 British Formula Three season
