= Alfa Romeo in motorsport =

Role of Alfa Romeo in different categories of motorsport

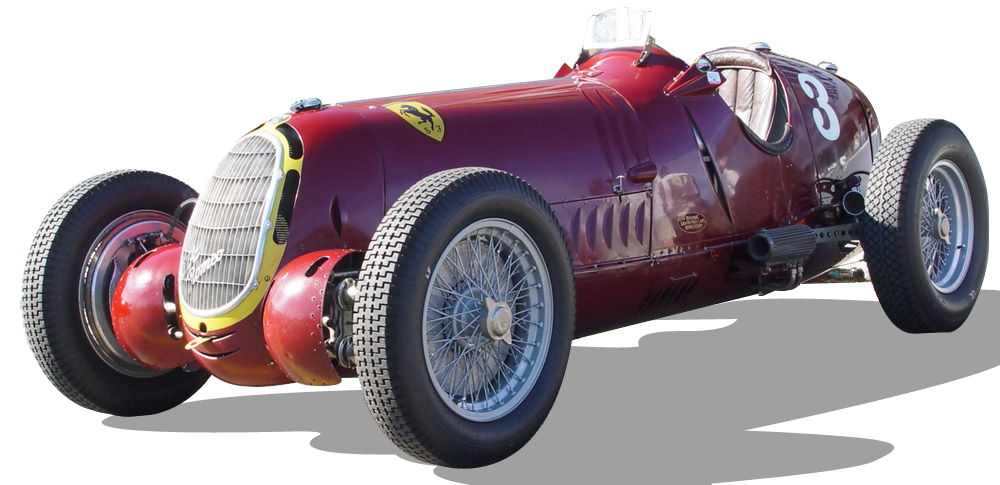
Alfa Romeo 8C-35 Scuderia Ferrari (1935)

During its history, Alfa Romeo has competed successfully in many different categories of motorsport, including Grand Prix motor racing, Formula One, sportscar racing, touring car racing and rallies. They have competed both as a constructor and an engine supplier, via works entries (usually under the name Alfa Corse or Autodelta) and private entries. The first racing car was made in 1913, three years after the foundation of A.L.F.A., the 40/60 HP had 6-litre straight-4 engine. Alfa Romeo quickly gained a good name in motorsport and gave a sporty image to the whole marque.

== Pre-war ==
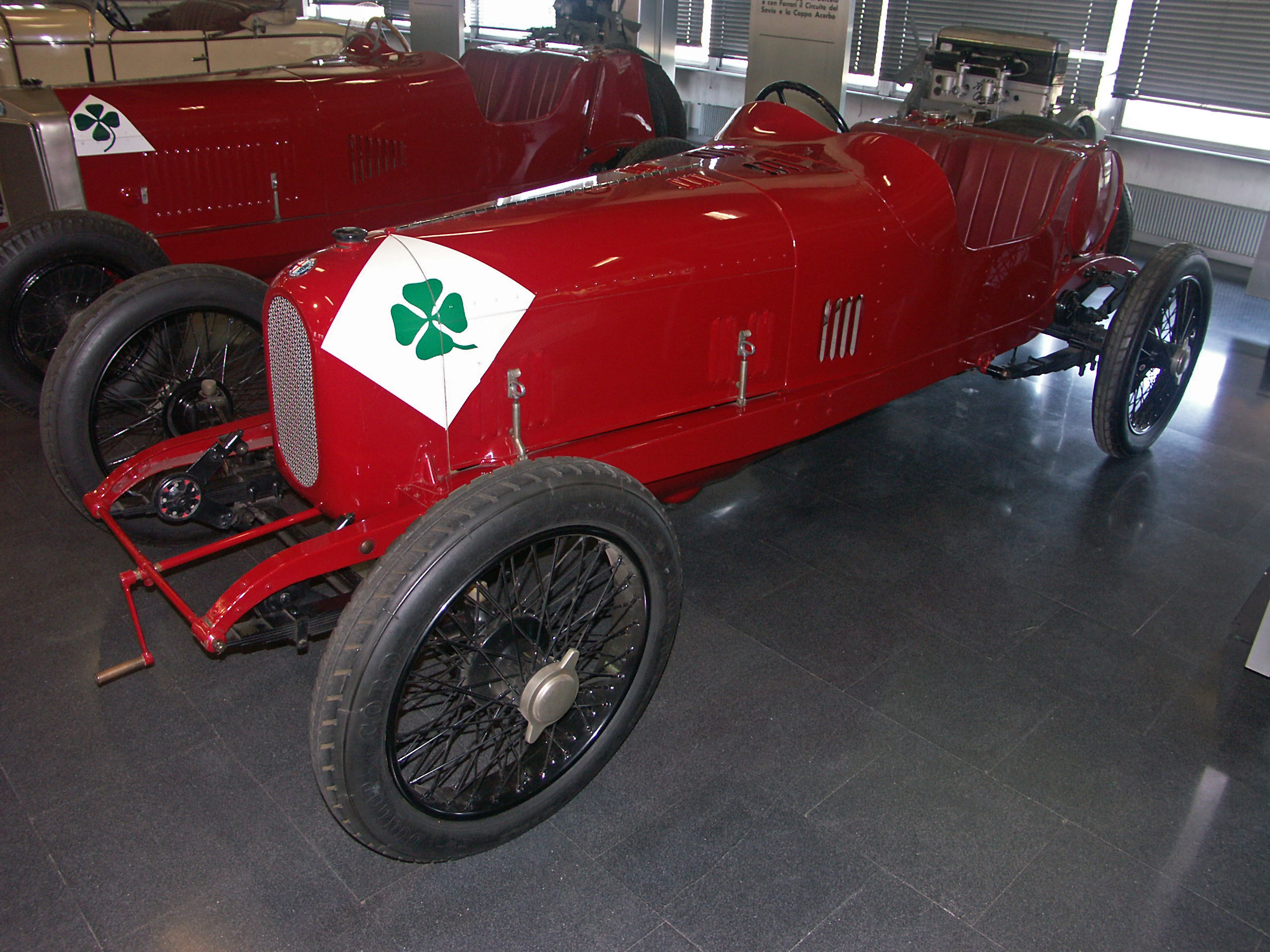
1923 Alfa Romeo RL (Targa Florio racing version).

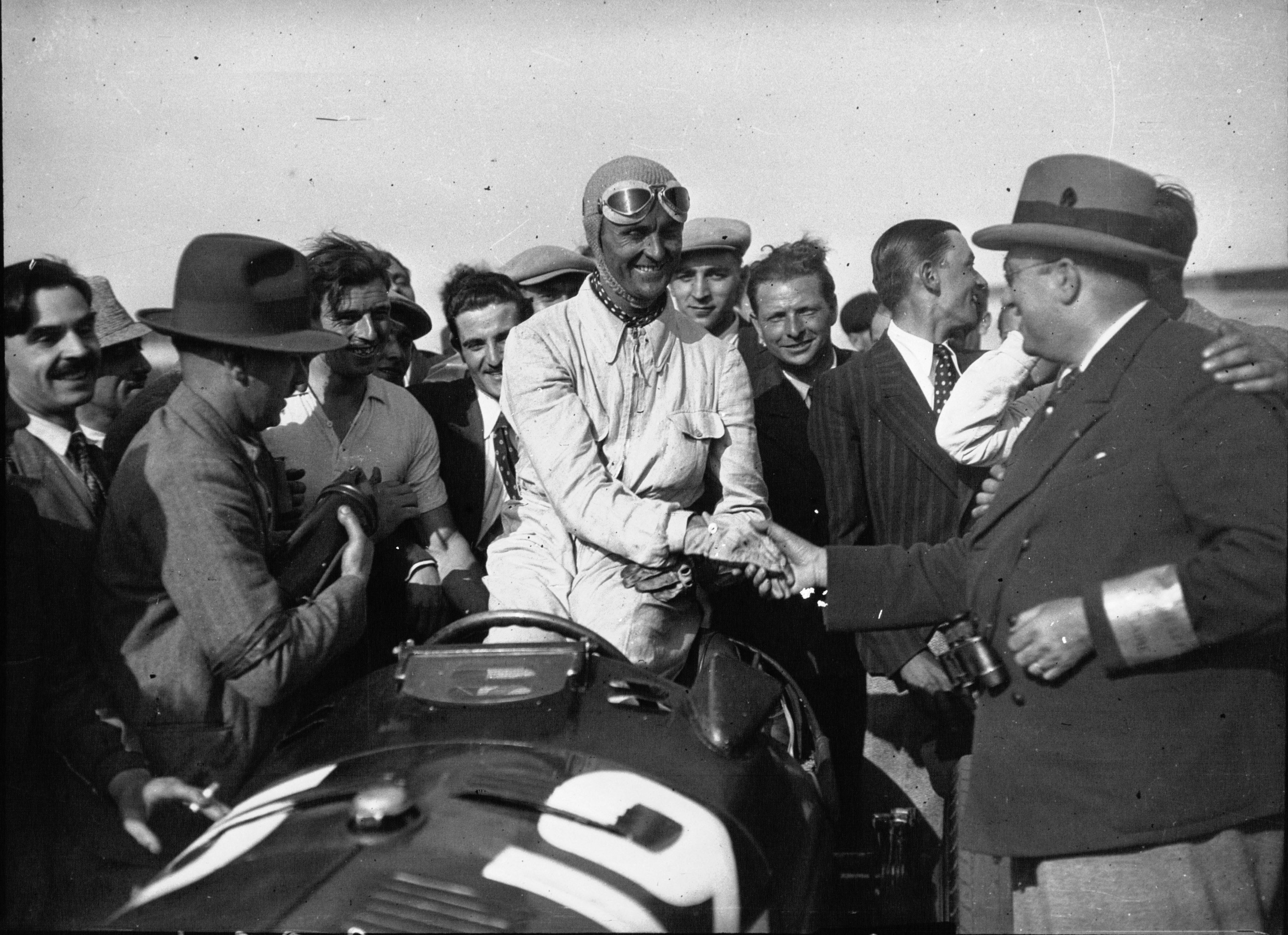
Louis Chiron after winning the 1934 French Grand Prix with an Alfa Romeo P3.

=== Early history ===
Alfa Romeo started motor racing almost immediately after it was founded. A.L.F.A. ventured into motor racing in 1911, with drivers Franchini and Ronzoni competing in the Targa Florio with two 24 HP models. The marque's first success came in 1913 when Nino Franchini finished second in the Parma-Poggio Berceto race with a 40/60 HP. Giuseppe Merosi built a very advanced racing car in 1914, which was named "Grand Prix". In 1920, Giuseppe Campari won the race at Mugello with a 40/60 HP, whilst Enzo Ferrari was second in Targa Florio in the same year. A year later, Giuseppe Campari won at Mugello again. Ugo Sivocci won the 1923 Targa Florio and Antonio Ascari took second, both with an RL. Sivocci's car was painted with the green cloverleaf on a white background that was to become Alfa's symbol on their sportiest models.

=== Grand Prix racing ===
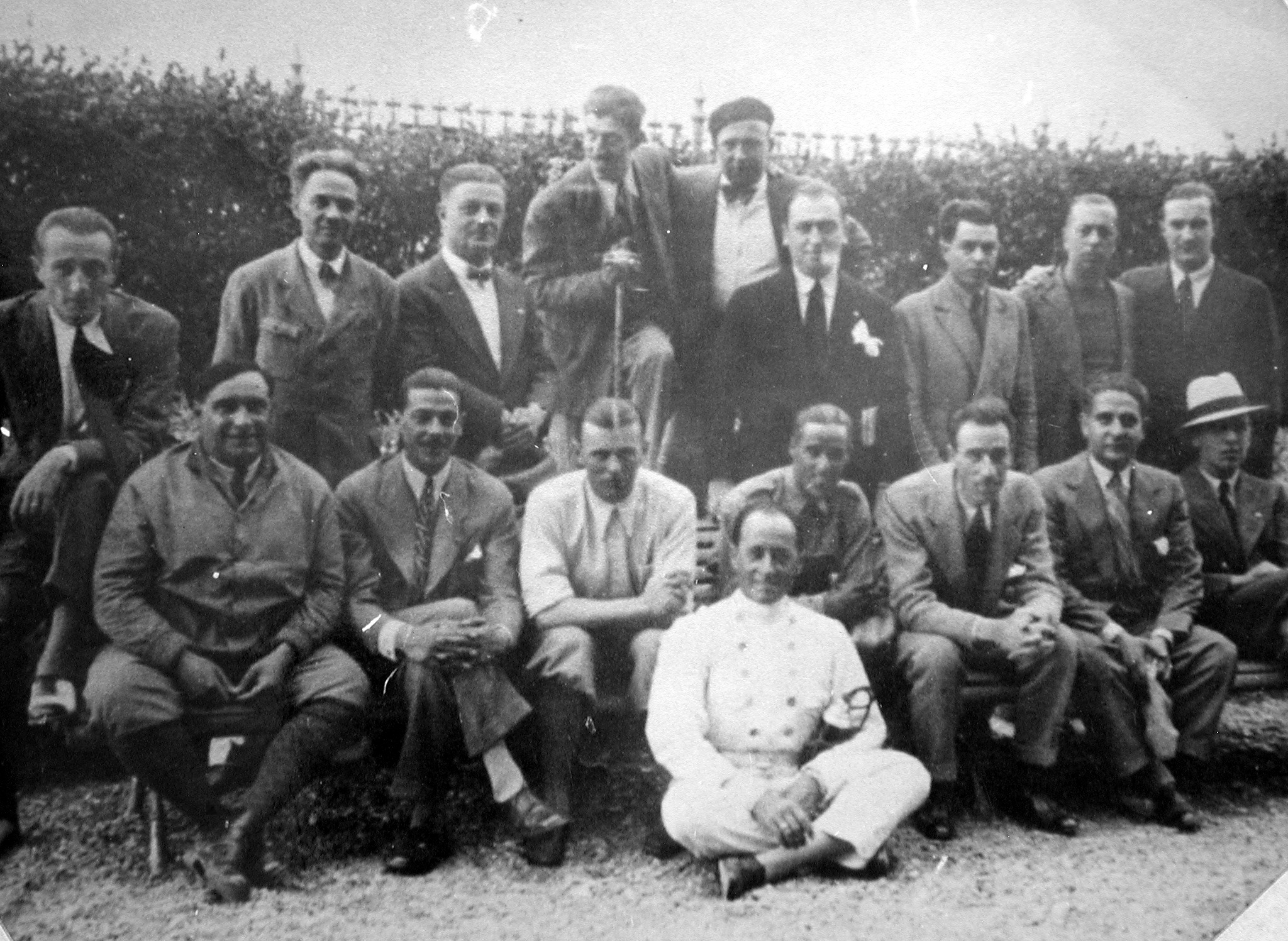
Alfa Romeo team: Giuseppe Campari, Prospero Gianferrari (Managing Director of Alfa Romeo), Achille Varzi, Luigi Arcangeli and Tazio Nuvolari.

In 1923, the automobile designer Vittorio Jano went from FIAT to Alfa, designing the engines that gave Alfa racing success into the late 1930s. In 1925, Alfa Romeo triumphed at the first Automobile World Championship in the history of motorsport, winning the European Grand Prix at Spa and the Italian Grand Prix at Monza.

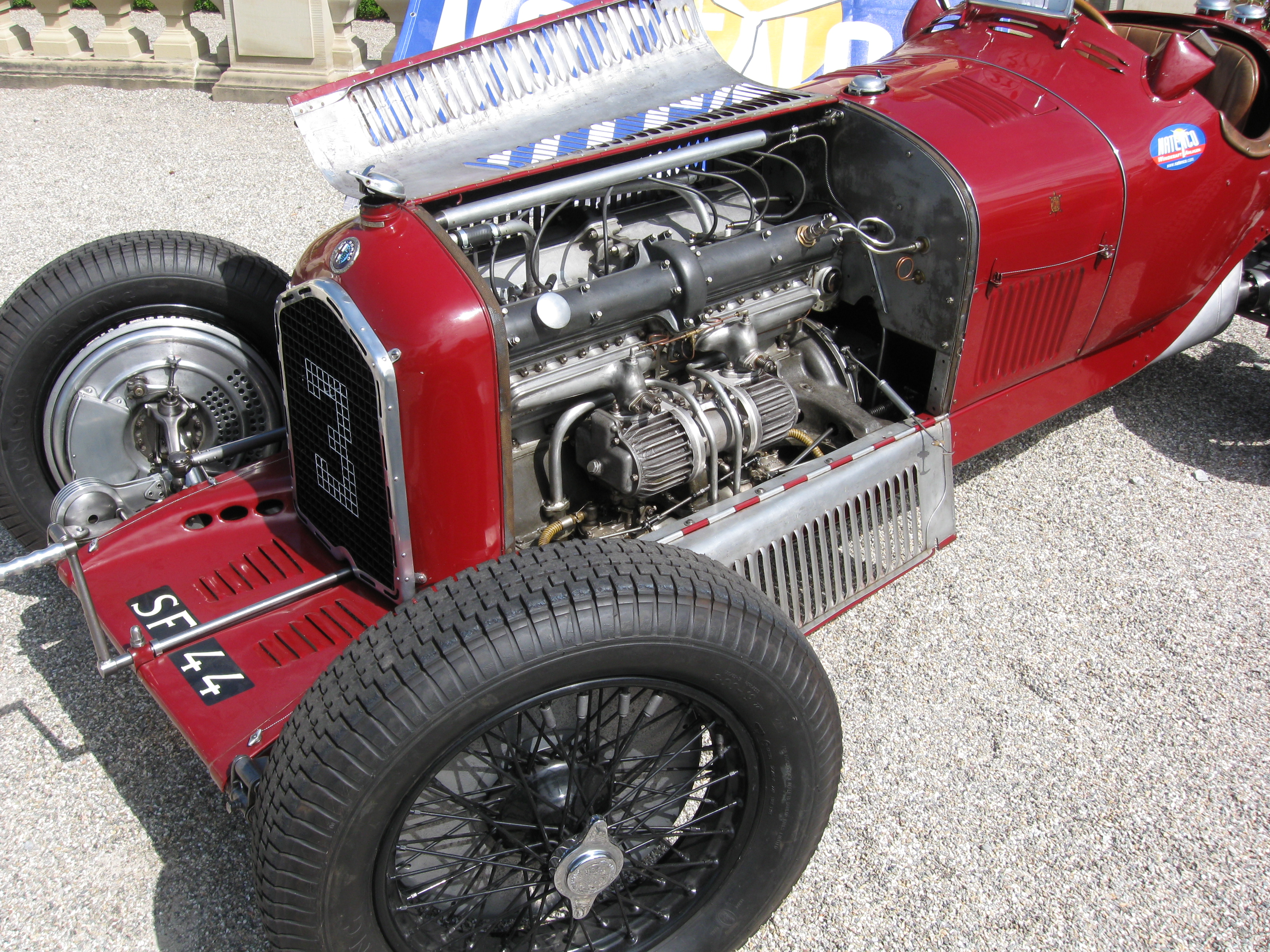
Engine of Jano's Alfa P3 Type B and its twin gear-driven superchargers.

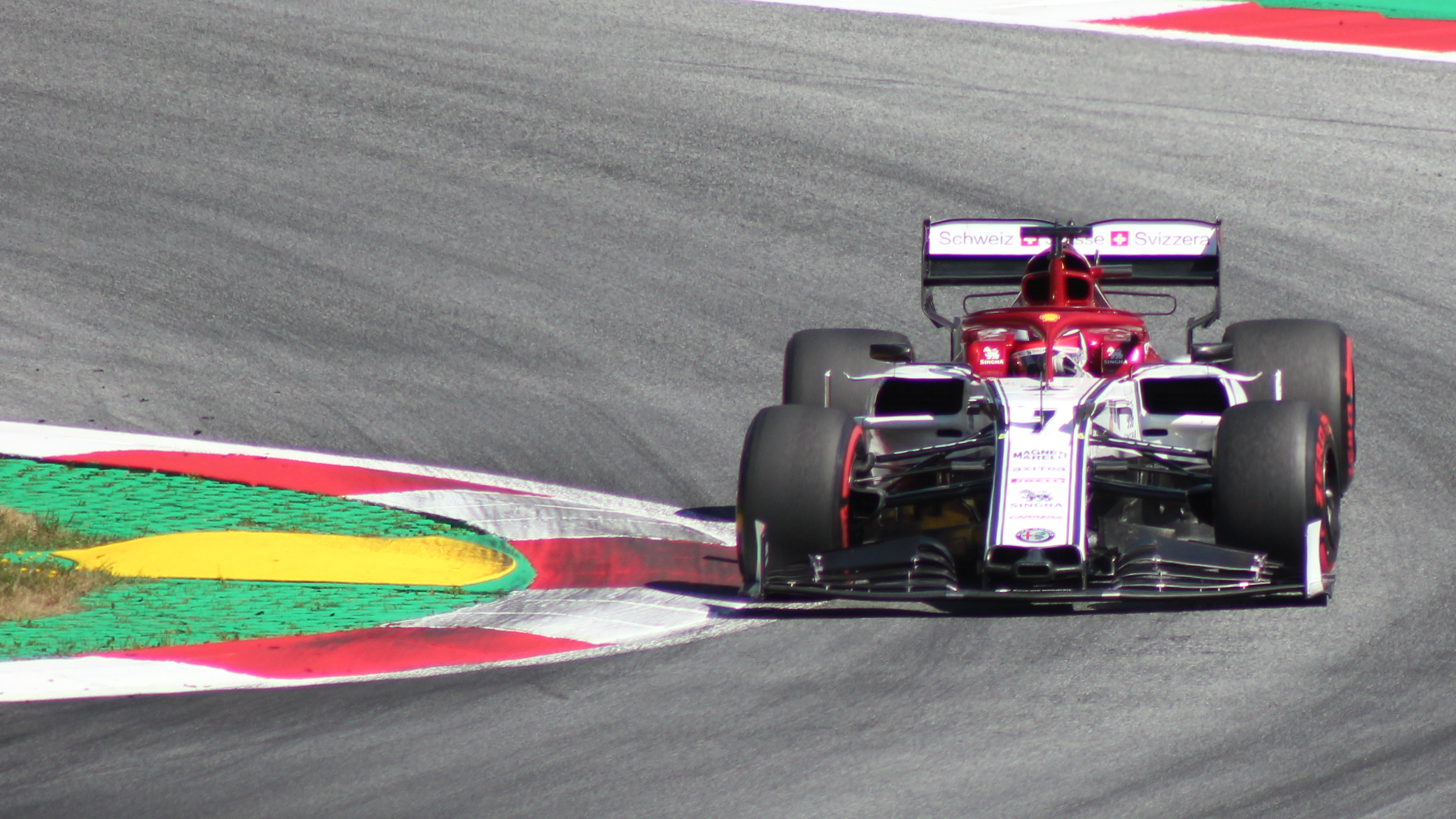
The Alfa Romeo Racing C38, driven by Kimi Räikkönen and Antonio Giovinazzi.

In 1932, Jano designed the sensational P3 which won its first race driven by Tazio Nuvolari at the Italian Grand Prix, as well as 5 more Grands Prix that year between Nuvolari and Rudolf Caracciola. In 1933, Alfa Romeo became insolvent and was transferred to Enzo Ferrari's team Scuderia Ferrari, but the P3 continue to win a variety of races that year, including the Italian and Spanish Grand Prix.

In 1934, Louis Chiron won the French Grand Prix, but the P3 started to lose its edge while the German Silver Arrows began to dominate. However, the P3 still managed to rack up some Grand Prix wins. 1935 was even tougher as the P3 was simply outclassed by the Silver Arrows, but Tazio Nuvolari gave it one of its most memorable victories by winning the 1935 German Grand Prix at the Nürburgring.

=== Sportscar racing ===
Notably, Tazio Nuvolari won the 1930 Mille Miglia in a 6C 1750 after having overtaken Achille Varzi just three kilometres from the finish line with the headlights off at nighttime, having driven that way to let Varzi believe that he was well ahead of Nuvolari. Alfa Romeo's cars won the Targa Florio six times in row in the 1930s and the Mille Miglia every year from 1928 to 1938 except for 1931.

The 8C 2300 won the Le Mans 24 Hours from 1931 to 1934. In 1938, Clemente Biondetti won the Mille Miglia in an 8C 2900B Corto Spider; notably, Biondetti will win the first edition of Mille Miglia post-war (1947) with another 8C 2900B.

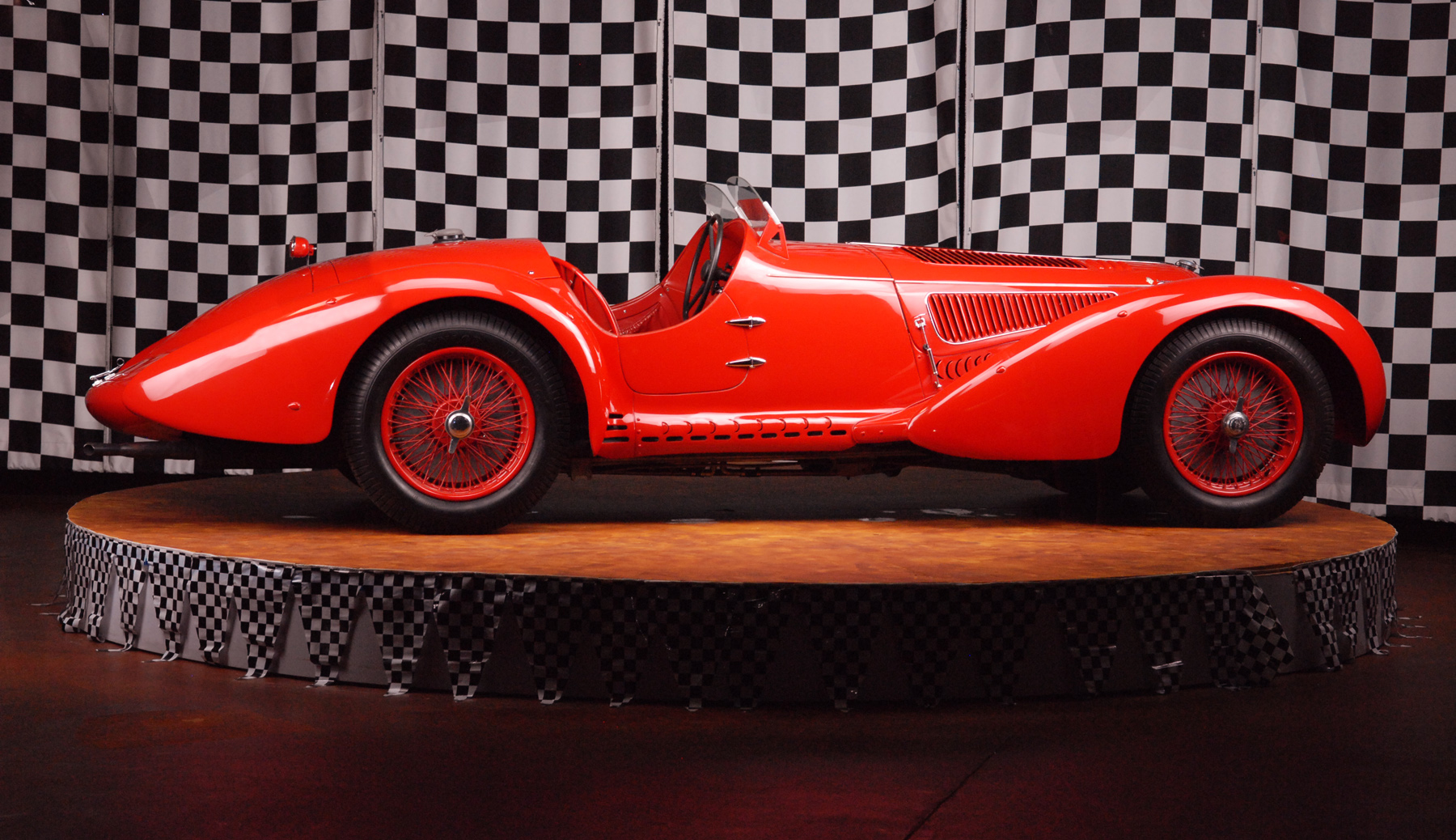
The Alfa Romeo 8C 2900B MM that won the 1938 Mille Miglia driven by Clemente Biondetti at the Simeone Foundation Automotive Museum, Philadelphia, USA.

== Post-war ==
=== Formula One ===
Alfa Romeo participated in Formula One, both as a constructor and engine supplier, from 1950 to 1987.

The works Alfa Romeo team dominated the first two years of the Formula One World Championship, using the pre-war 158/159 Alfetta, but withdrew from Formula One at the end of 1951.

During the 1960s, minor teams such as LDS, Cooper, and De Tomaso used the Alfa Romeo straight-four engines. In the early 1970s, a V8 Alfa Romeo appeared in McLaren and March cars.

The Brabham team used Alfa Romeo engines from 1976 to 1979, foreshadowing a return by Alfa Romeo as a constructor from 1979 to 1985.

Alfa Romeo also supplied engines to the small Italian Osella team from 1983 to 1987. For the 1987 season, Alfa Romeo made a deal to supply engines to Ligier, but both deals were cancelled when Fiat took control of Alfa Romeo.

In November 2017, Sauber signed a multi-year technical and commercial partnership contract with Alfa Romeo, therefore renaming to Alfa Romeo Sauber F1 Team for the 2018 season. On 1 February 2019, Sauber announced that it would compete in the 2019 season as Alfa Romeo Racing, although the ownership, racing licence, and management structure would remain unchanged. Alfa Romeo ended their partnership with Sauber at the end of the 2023 season, where Sauber will compete as the Audi factory team in 2026.

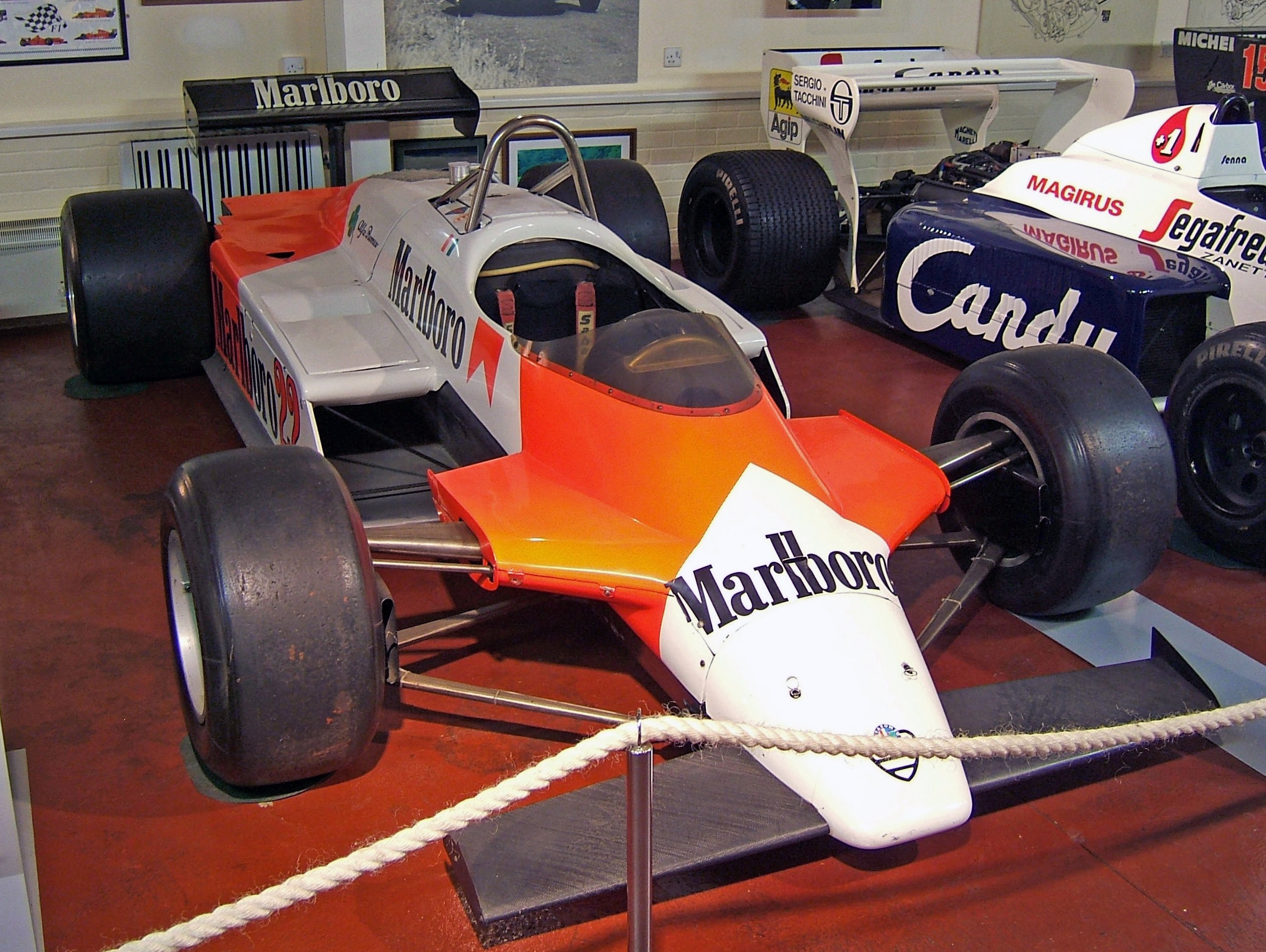
An Alfa Romeo 182 Formula One car (1982) at the Donington Grand Prix Collection, Donington Park, UK.

=== Formula Three ===
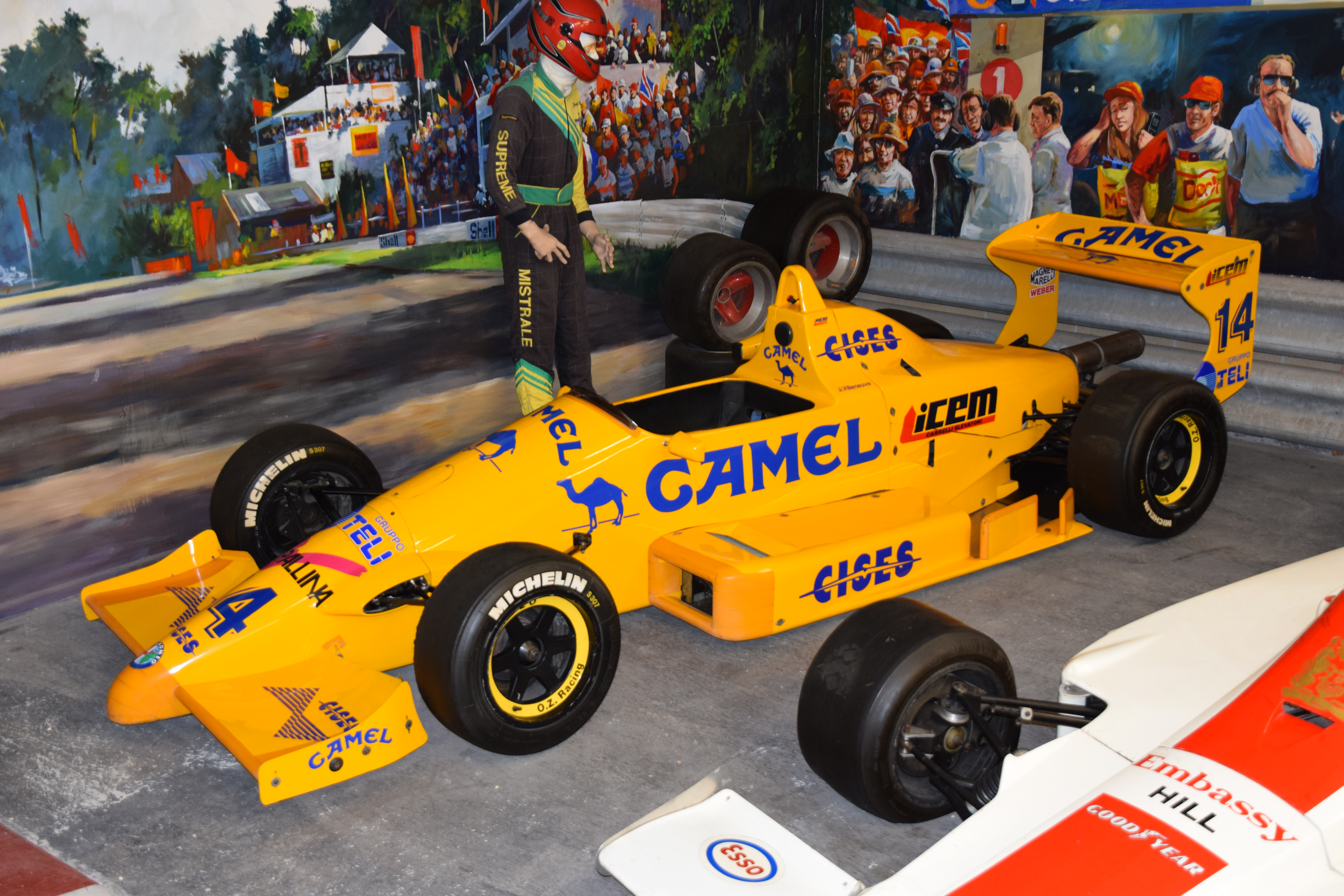
1989 Reynard 893 Alfa Romeo Formula 3 car of Jacques Villeneuve at the Haynes International Motor Museum.

Alfa Romeo has also supplied engines to Formula Three cars.

In Europe, Alfa Romeo won five FIA European Formula 3 Championship and five FIA European Formula 3 Cup as well as a plethora of national championships in Italy (11), France (7), Germany (2), Switzerland (5), Sweden, and Austria (2). Among these, the 1979 Piercarlo Ghinzani victory at the Italian Formula Three Championship driving a Euroracing March 793 with a 2 litre Alfa engine, the four consecutive Italian titles between 1981 and 1984, and Michele Alboreto's 1980 victory at the FIA European Formula 3 Championship with a March-Alfa Romeo. Noteworthy was the adoption of the Twin Spark engine 1987 which fostered this success.

In South America, Alfa Romeo won 4 Formula 3 Sudamericana titles, 7 Mexican Championships, 1 Brazilian Championship, and 3 Chilean Championship.

From 2019 to 2020, a Tatuus T-318 powered by an Autotecnica Motori tuned Alfa Romeo 1.75 L 4-cyl turbocharged engine producing 270 metric horsepower (200 kW) was used in the Formula Regional European Championship, the Formula Regional Asian Championship, and the W Series.

=== Formula Alfa Boxer ===
After the great success of the one-make championship Trofeo Alfasud, in 1987 Alfa Romeo launched the new Formula Alfa Boxer racing car which had an engine derived from the 33 and the Sprint. Amato Ferrari won the debut championship in 1987, followed by Mirko Savoldi in 1988 and Alessandro Zampedri in 1989.

In 1990, this engine was replaced by a more powerful Quadrifoglio Verde engine. In 1992, a European Championship (Formula Boxer Europe) was launched and the choice of chassis was liberalised. The last Formula Alfa Boxer series season was held in 1995.

=== Indycars (1989–1991) ===
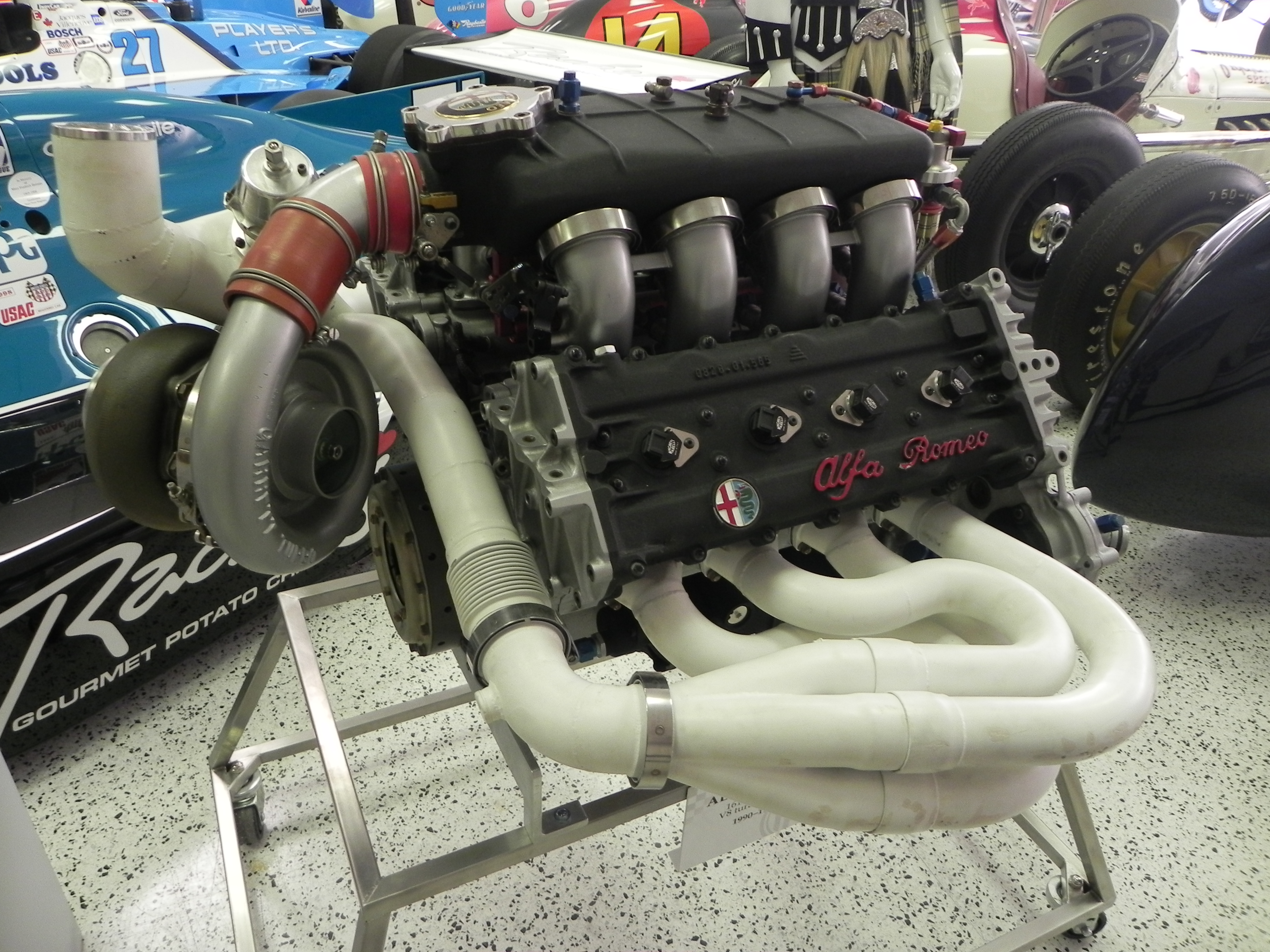
Alfa Romeo Indycar engine

From 1989 to 1991, Alfa Romeo participated in the PPG Indy Car World Series. The 2648 cc, turbocharged V8 engine produced 720 bhp. In the 1989 season, the engine was mated to a chassis specially built by March and prepared by Alex Morales Motorsports, with Roberto Guerrero at the wheel. Guerrero only managed a best of 8th place at Detroit, before both driver and engine moved onto Patrick Racing for 1990, again with a March chassis. That season proved to be an improvement, as Guerrero finished 16th place in the points standings, with a best finish of 5th place. The next year would be Alfa's last. The team switched to a Lola chassis, and Danny Sullivan took over the drive, finishing 11th in the points, with a best finish of 4th. In the end, Alfa Romeo would finish its Indy Car project without scoring a single podium, pole position, or race win.

=== Rally ===
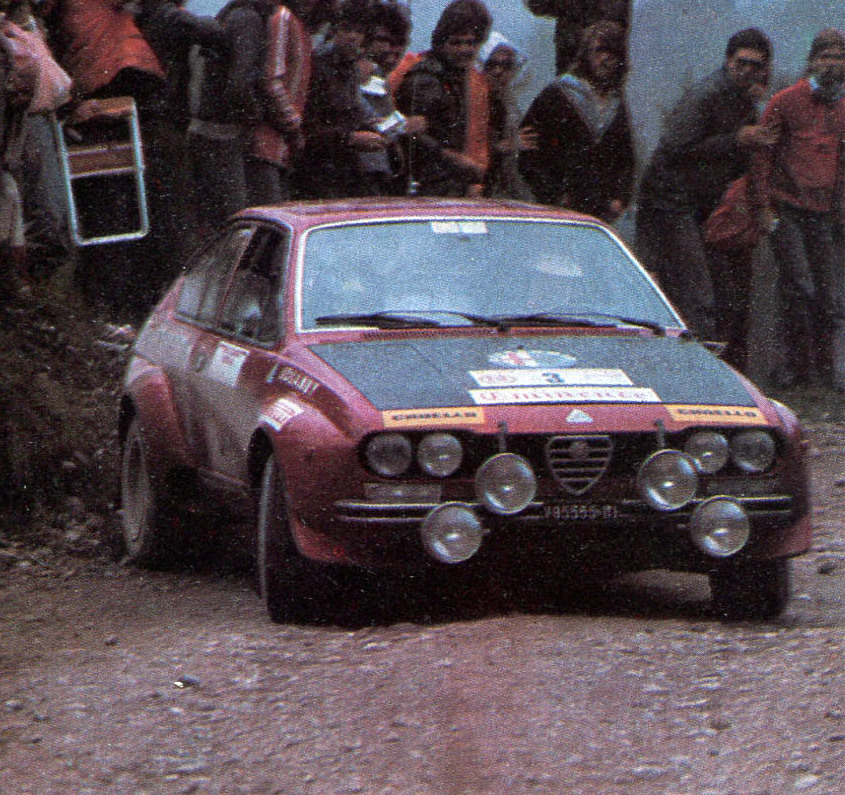
Jean-Claude Andruet and co-driver Yves Jouanny on an Alfa Romeo Alfetta GT (Group 2) at the 1975 Rally of San Martino di Castrozza.

Alfa Romeo cars have also been used in rallying, mostly by private teams.

In the 1950s, Alfa Romeo Giulietta won the 1957 Tour de Corse and the 1958 1000 Lakes Rally, as well as the Alpine Rally in 1956 and 1958. The victories in Alpine Rally were replicated in 1963 (Alfa Romeo Giulietta SZ), 1964 (Alfa Romeo Giulia TZ), 1966 (Alfa Romeo GTA) under the management of the racing department Autodelta, making Alfa Romeo the most successful car maker in this competition.

Racing versions of the Alfetta GT and GTV were built by Autodelta in the 1970s, initially with an aspirated engine from the earlier GTA, for homologation under FIA Group 2. In this form, they were rallied with moderate success in 1975, winning the Elba and Costa Brava rallies overall, as well as winning the Group 2 category in the Tour de Corse. In 1980, the Alfetta GTV Turbodelta was already homologated in FIA Group 4, since the required number of production cars had been built. A racing version campaigned in rallies, but once more the effort was abandoned after a single season, despite scoring a win at the Danube Rally.

In 1986, Alfa Romeo GTV6 was one of the fastest Group A rally cars. However, FIA reclassified it as a Group B car at the end of 1986, changing it from a winning car to a car that was much less competitive. The GTV6 placed 3rd in 1986 Tour de Corse. In 1987, with Greg Carrbehind the wheel, the GTV6 was the last rear-wheel drive car to win the Australian Rally Championship.

=== Sportscars (1967–1977) ===
On March 6, 1963, Alfa Romeo's racing department Autodelta was established to run Alfa Romeo's sportscar programme, directed by ex-Alfa Romeo and Ferrari engineer Carlo Chiti. Competing with the Alfa Romeo TZ, the team began to collect some remarkable wins in its 1.6 category, including in the 1964 Coppa F.I.S.A., the 1964 12 Hours of Sebring, the 48th Targa Florio, the 1964 Nürburgring 1000 km, and the 1964 24 Hours of Le Mans.

In 1967, Carlo Chiti and the Audodelta team designed a new 90-degree V8 engine for their Alfa Romeo Tipo 33 sportscar and ultimately a flat-12 engine for the Alfa Romeo 33TT12. These cars were raced in the World Sportscar Championship from 1967 to 1977, winning the World Championship for Makes in 1975 with the 33TT12 and the World Championship for Sports Cars in 1977 with the Alfa Romeo 33SC12. The company developed a Group C prototype in the early 1990s, codenamed the SE 048SP, but this never raced.

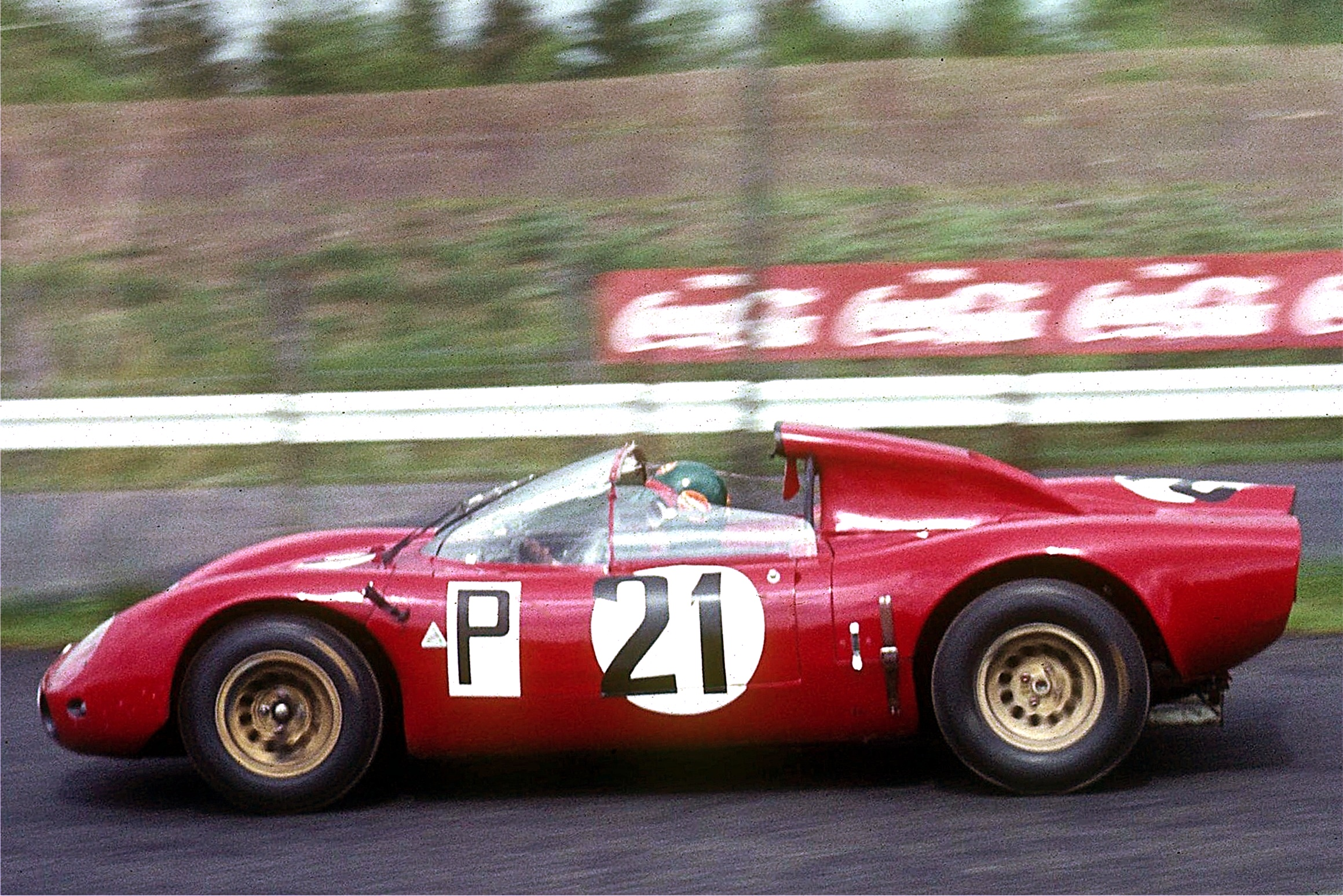
Alfa Romeo Tipo 33/2 during training on the 1000-km race at the Nürburgring, 1967.

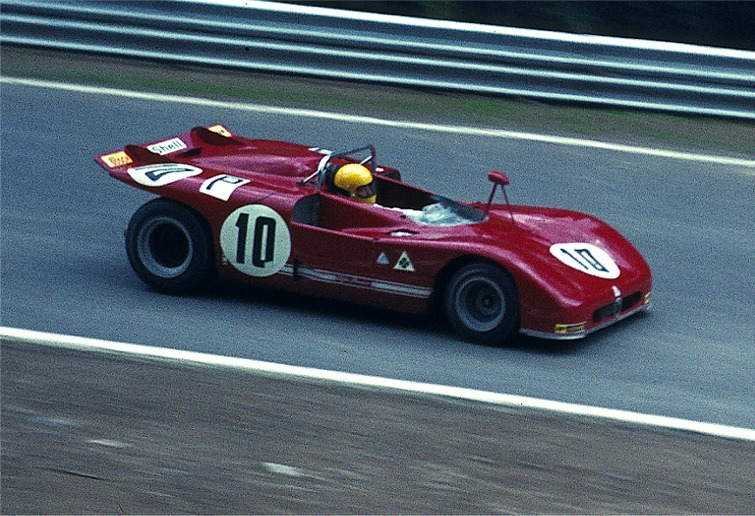
Nanni Galli training with 33/3 at the Nürburgring in 1971.

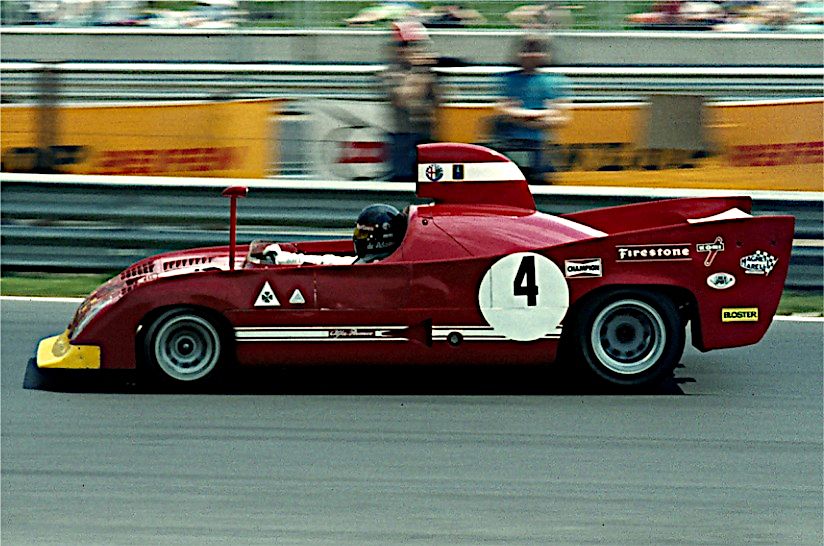
Andrea de Adamich with Alfa Romeo 33TT12 in 1974 at the Nürburgring.

=== Touring cars ===
Starting from the 1960s, Alfa Romeo has won many touring car titles. The Alfa Romeo GTA won the European Touring Car Championship (ETCC) in 1966, 1967 and 1969. The later Alfa Romeo GTAm won further ETCC titles in 1970, 1971 and 1972. Among other victories, the GTA won the inaugural Sports Car Club of America's Under 2 Liter Trans-Am championship in 1966 with Horst Kwech and Gaston Andrey at the wheel. repeating the feat in the 1970 season. The Alfa Romeo Alfetta GTV6 won four consecutive European Touring Car Championship titles between 1982 and 1985. The British Touring Car Championship was won in 1983 by Andy Rouse driving an Alfetta GTV6 and again in 1994 by Gabriele Tarquini with an Alfa Romeo 155.

In 1993, the Deutsche Tourenwagen Meisterschaft (DTM) series was won by Nicola Larini with an Alfa Romeo 155 V6 Ti, also achieving the all-time record wins of championship races in a season (11). The successor of the 155, the Alfa Romeo 156 won the European Touring Car Championship four times in a row from 2000 to 2003, with Fabrizio Giovanardi and Gabriele Tarquini.

From 2007 to 2009, Alfa Romeo's cars (159 and 147) won in Eco Diesel categories (Class G and H) of the Bathurst 12 Hour race on three consecutive occasions.

In recent years, several different drivers and teams have competed with the Alfa Romeo Giulietta in various TCR Touring Car series worldwide:

- Matteo Leone, Riccardo Missiroli, Andrea Bacci, Andrea Mosca, and Gianni Giudici in the 2016 Italian Touring Car Championship.
- Fabio Marchiafava, Loris Cencetti, and Philippe Ménage (competing with the Charleroi on Tracks team) in the 2016 TCR BeNeLux Touring Car Championship.
- Mario Ferraris, Petr Fulín, Andrea Belicchi, and Michela Cerruti (competing with the Mulsanne Racing team) in the 2016 TCR International Series.
- Márk Jedlóczky (competing with the Unicorse Team) and Shota Abkhazava, Davit Kajaia, Dušan Borković, and Michela Cerruti (competing with the GE-Force team) in the 2017 TCR International Series.
- Giacomo Altoè, Joakim Darbom, Tommaso Mosca, and Luigi Ferrara (competing with the V-Action Racing team) and Andrea Bacci and Andrea Mosca (competing with the Etruria team) in the 2017 TCR Italy Touring Car Championship.
- Gianni Morbidelli, Luigi Ferrara, Kevin Ceccon and Fabrizio Giovanardi (competing with the Team Mulsanne) in the 2018 World Touring Car Cup.
- Rob Austin (competing with the DUO Motorsport with HMS Racing team) in the 2018 British Touring Car Championship.
- Adriano Bernazzani and Edoardo Cappello (competing with the Otto Motorsport team) and Kevin Ceccon (competing with the Team Mulsanne) in the 2018 TCR Italy Touring Car Championship.
- Alex Popow, Alex Papadopulos, Mark Kvamme, Trenton Estep, and Ryan Nash (competing with the TMR Engineering and Consulting Inc. team) in the IMSA 2019 Michelin Pilot Challenge.
- Roy Block and Tim Lewis Jr. (competing with the KMW Motorsports with TMR Engineering team) in the IMSA Michelin Pilot Challenge from 2019 to 2023. For the 2024 season, William Tally replaced Roy Block.

In addition, Tecnodom Sport used the Alfa Romeo MiTo in the 2016 season of the Italian Touring Car Championship.

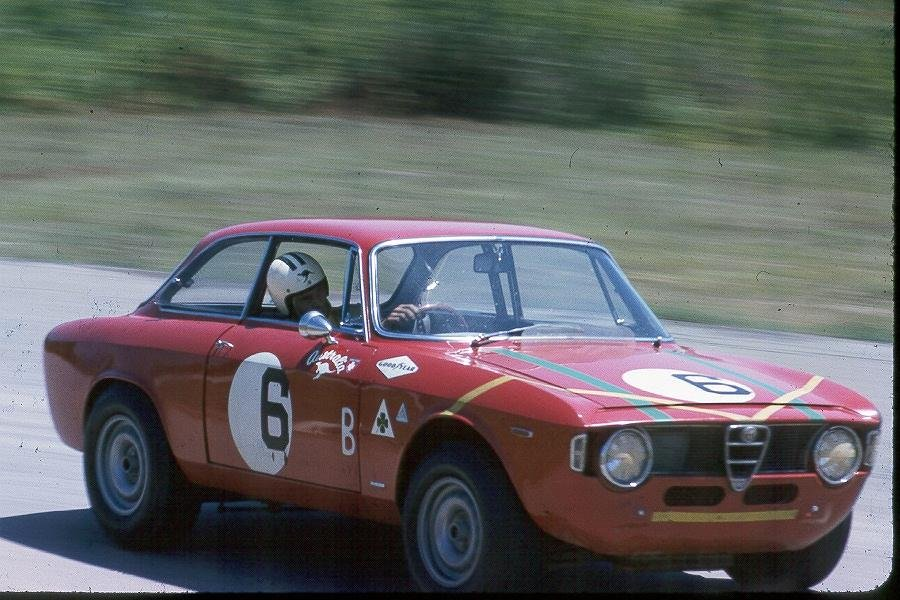
The Alfa Romeo GTA during the 1966 Trans-Am Championship, driven by Horst Kwech and Gaston Andrey.

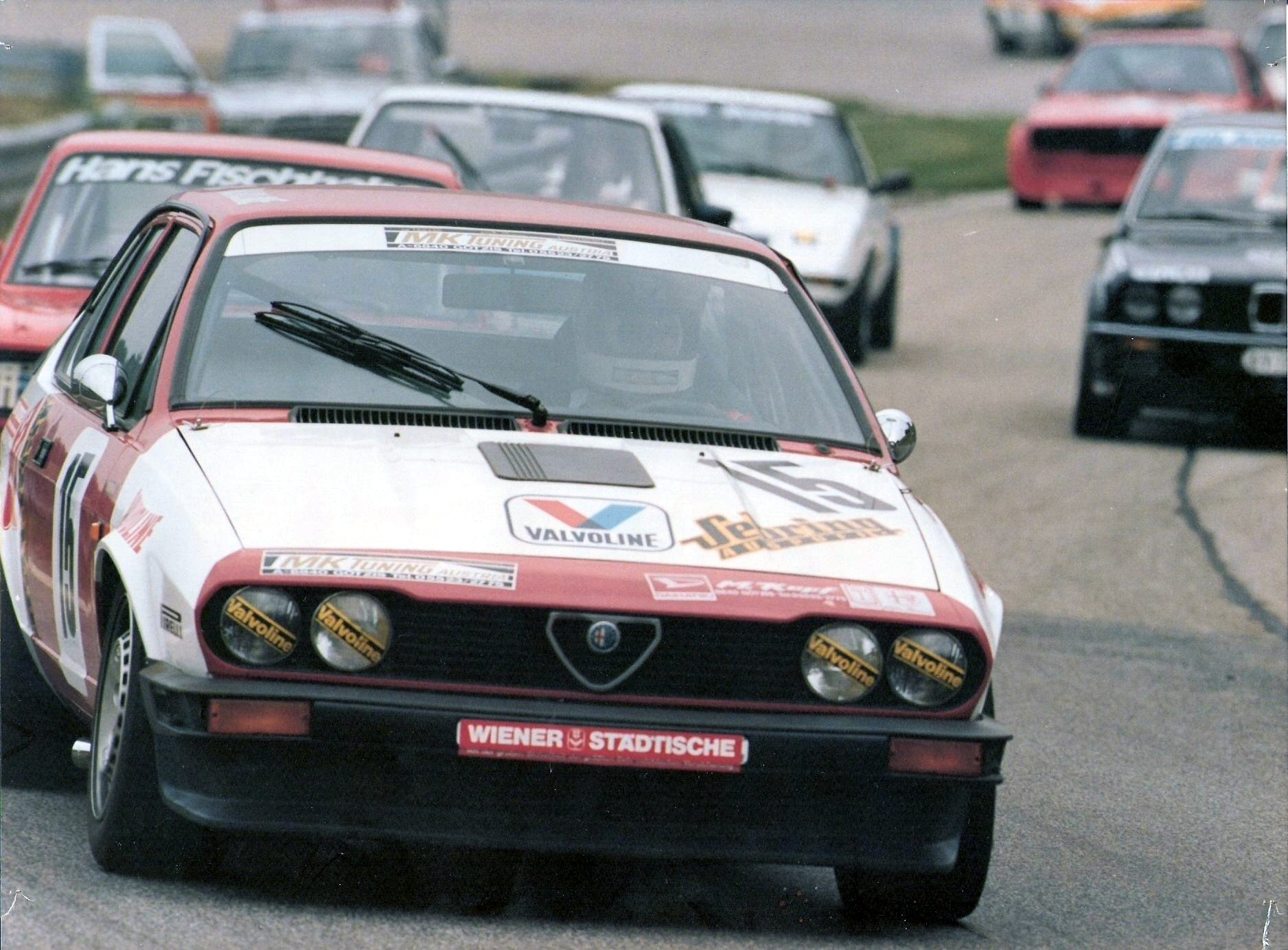
Michael Kopf driving the Alfa Romeo Alfetta GTV6 at Hockenheimring, during the 1984 DTM series.

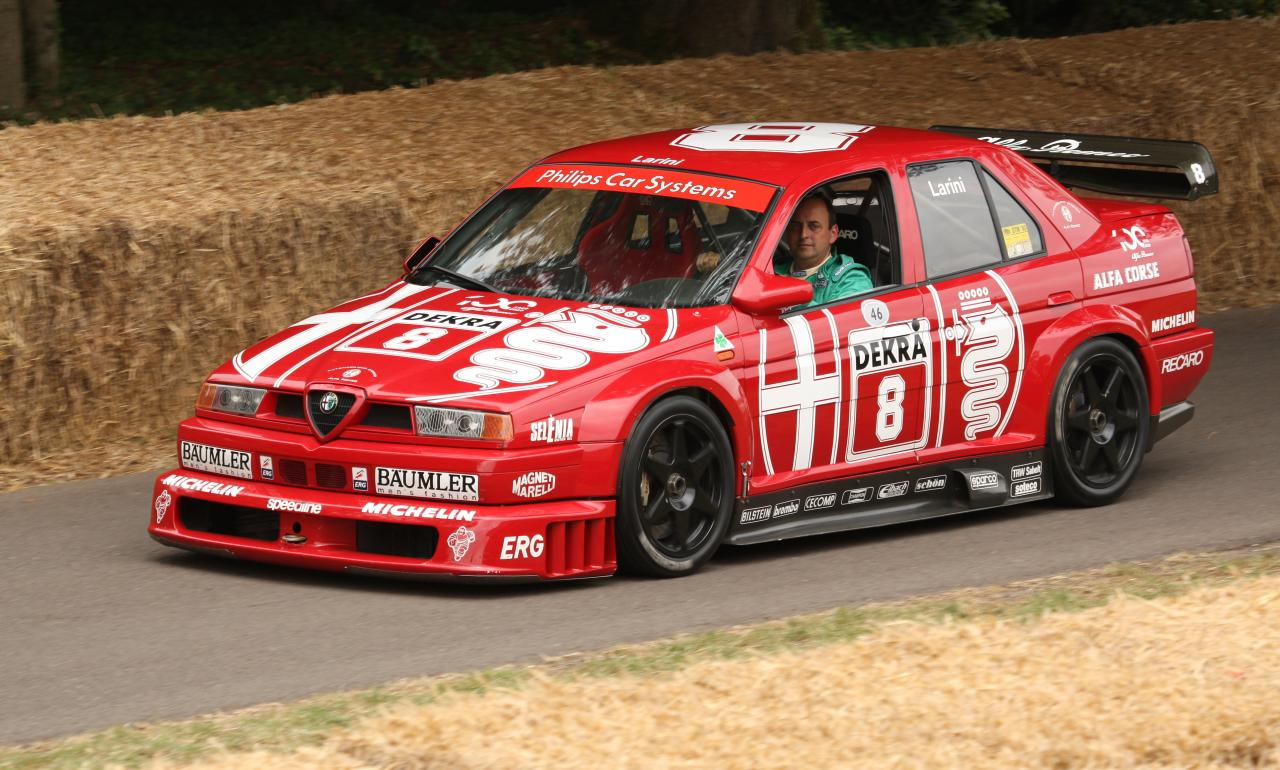
The Alfa Romeo 155 V6 Ti, the 1993 DTM season winner with Nicola Larini, at the 2010 Goodwood Festival of Speed.

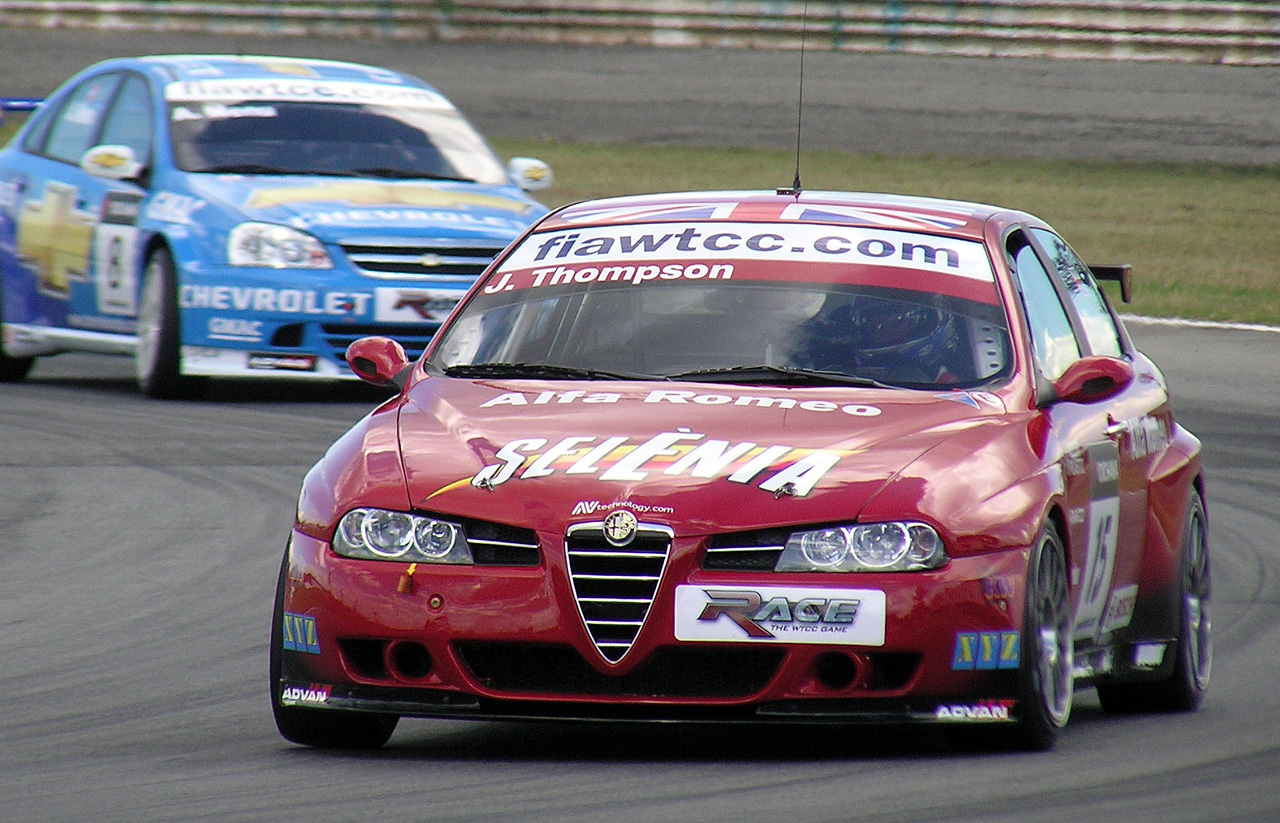
The Alfa Romeo 156, driven by James Thompson, during the 2007 WTCC round at Curitiba.

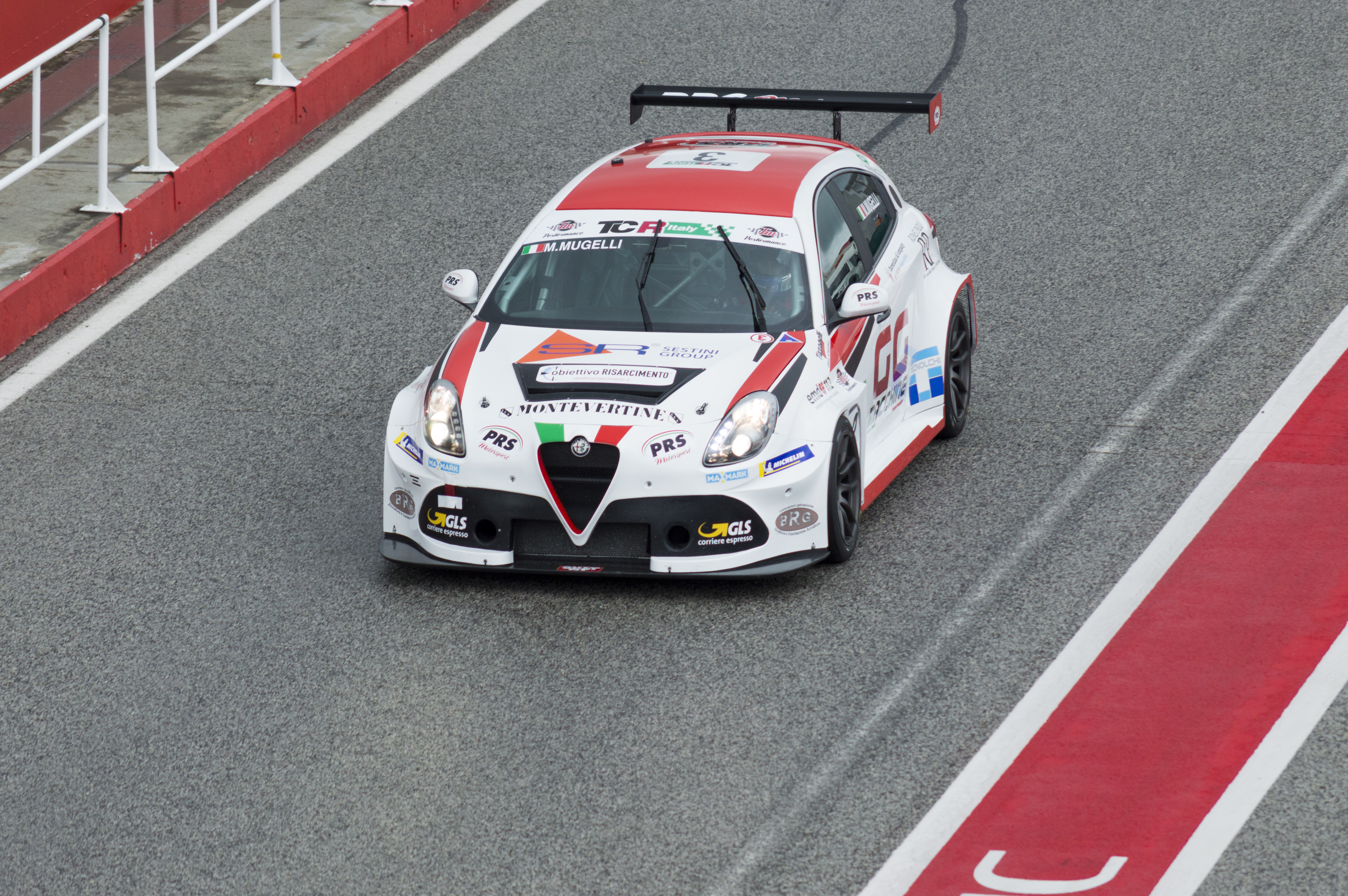
The Alfa Romeo Giulietta TCR, driven by Massimiliano Mugelli, during the 2019 TCR Italy Touring Car Championship at Misano.

== Major victories and championships ==
Alfa Romeo has won the following major trophies and championships:

Year	Competition	Class	Driver(s)	Car(s)	Ref(s)
1923	Targa Florio		Ugo Sivocci	Alfa Romeo RL Targa Florio	
1925	World Manufacturers' Championship		Antonio Ascari, Giuseppe Campari, Gastone Brilli-Peri, Pete DePaolo, Giovanni Minozzi	Alfa Romeo P2	
1928	Mille Miglia		Giuseppe Campari, Giulio Ramponi	Alfa Romeo 6C 1500 Super Sport Spider Zagato	
1929	Mille Miglia (2)		Giuseppe Campari, Giulio Ramponi	Alfa Romeo 6C 1750 Super Sport Spider Zagato	
1930	Mille Miglia (3)		Tazio Nuvolari, Battista Guidotti	Alfa Romeo 6C 1750 Gran Sport Spider Zagato	
1930	Targa Florio (2)		Achille Varzi	Alfa Romeo P2	
1931	AIACR European Championship		Ferdinando Minoia	Alfa Romeo 8C 2300	
1931	24 Hours of Le Mans		Francis Curzon, Henry Birkin	Alfa Romeo 8C 2300 LM	
1931	Targa Florio (3)		Tazio Nuvolari	Alfa Romeo 8C 2300 Monza	
1932	AIACR European Championship (2)		Tazio Nuvolari	Alfa Romeo P3	
1932	European Hill Climb Championship	Racing Cars	Rudolf Caracciola	Alfa Romeo Monza	
1932	24 Hours of Le Mans (2)		Raymond Sommer, Luigi Chinetti	Alfa Romeo 8C 2300 MM	
1932	Mille Miglia (4)		Baconin Borzacchini, Amedeo Bignami	Alfa Romeo 8C 2300 Spider Touring	
1932	Targa Florio (4)		Tazio Nuvolari	Alfa Romeo 8C 2300 Monza	
1933	Mille Miglia (5)		Tazio Nuvolari, Decimo Compagnoni	Alfa Romeo 8C 2300 Spider Zagato	
1933	European Hill Climb Championship (2)	Racing Cars	Carlo Felice Trossi	Alfa Romeo Monza 8C 2600	
1933	European Hill Climb Championship (Sports Cars)		Mario Tadini	Alfa Romeo 8C 2300 Monza	
1933	24 Hours of Le Mans (3)		Raymond Sommer, Tazio Nuvolari	Alfa Romeo 8C 2300 MM-LM	
1933	Targa Florio (5)		Antonio Brivio	Alfa Romeo 8C 2300 Monza	
1934	24 Hours of Le Mans (4)		Luigi Chinetti, Philippe Étancelin	Alfa Romeo 8C 2300	
1934	Mille Miglia (6)		Achille Varzi, Amedeo Bignami	Alfa Romeo 8C 2600 Monza Spider Brianza	
1934	Targa Florio (6)		Achille Varzi	Alfa Romeo P3	
1935	Mille Miglia (7)		Carlo Maria Pintacuda, Alessandro Della Stufa	Alfa Romeo P3	
1935	Targa Florio (7)		Antonio Brivio	Alfa Romeo P3	
1936	Mille Miglia (8)		Antonio Brivio, Carlo Ongaro	Alfa Romeo 8C 2900 A	
1937	Mille Miglia (9)		Carlo Maria Pintacuda, Paride Mambelli	Alfa Romeo 8C 2900 A	
1938	Mille Miglia (10)		Clemente Biondetti, Aldo Stefani	Alfa Romeo 8C 2900 B Spider MM Touring	
1947	Mille Miglia (11)		Clemente Biondetti, Emilio Romano	Alfa Romeo 8C 2900 B Berlinetta Touring	
1950	Formula One World Drivers' Championship		Giuseppe Farina	Alfa Romeo 158	
1950	Targa Florio (8)		Mario Bornigia, Giancarlo Bornigia	Alfa Romeo 6C 2500 Competizione	
1951	Formula One World Drivers' Championship (2)		Juan Manuel Fangio	Alfa Romeo 159	
1954	Giro d'Italia automobilistico		Luigi Taramazzo, Gerino Gerini	Alfa Romeo 1900 SS	
1956	Alpine Rally		Michel Collange	Alfa Romeo Giulietta SZ	
1958	Alpine Rally (2)		Bernard Consten	Alfa Romeo Giulietta SZ	
1960	Alpine Rally (3)		Roger de Lageneste	Alfa Romeo Giulietta SZ	
1962	Italian Rally Championship		Arnaldo Cavallari	Alfa Romeo Giulietta TI	
1963	Alpine Rally (4)		Jean Rolland	Alfa Romeo Giulietta SZ	
1963	Italian Rally Championship (2)		Arnaldo Cavallari	Alfa Romeo Giulietta TI	
1964	Alpine Rally (5)		Jean Rolland	Alfa Romeo Giulia TZ	
1964	Italian Rally Championship (3)		Arnaldo Cavallari	Alfa Romeo Giulia TI Super	
1964	Sandown 6 Hour International	Group 1 Touring cars	Roberto Bussinello, Ralph Sachs	Alfa Romeo Giulia TI Super	
1965	International 6 Hour Touring Car Race	Group 1 Appendix J Touring cars	Frank Gardner, Kevin Bartlett	Alfa Romeo Giulia TI Super	
1966	Alpine Rally (6)		Jean Rolland	Alfa Romeo Giulia GTA	
1966	Australian Touring Car Championship	1501–2000cc	Kevin Bartlett	Alfa Romeo GTA	
1966	European Touring Car Championship (Drivers)	Division 2	Andrea de Adamich	Alfa Romeo 1600 GTA	
1966	European Touring Car Championship (Manufacturers)	Division 2	Various	Alfa Romeo 1600 GTA	
1966	Mitropa Rally Cup		Arnaldo Cavallari	Alfa Romeo GTA	
1966	Trans-Am Series	Under 2-Liter Manufacturers	Horst Kwech, Gaston Andrey	Alfa Romeo GTA	
1967	Australian Touring Car Championship (2)	1501–2000cc	Kevin Bartlett	Alfa Romeo GTA	
1967	European Hill Climb Championship	Serial Cars	Ignazio Giunti	Alfa Romeo GTA	
1967	European Touring Car Championship (Drivers) (2)	Division 2	Andrea de Adamich	Alfa Romeo 1600 GTA	
1967	European Touring Car Championship (Manufacturers)(2)	Division 2	Various	Alfa Romeo 1600 GTA	
1967	Bathurst 500	E	Doug Chivas, Max Stewart	Alfa Romeo 1600 GTA	
1968	Australian Drivers' Championship	Australian National Formula	Kevin Bartlett	Brabham BT23D Alfa Romeo	
1968	Bathurst 500 (2)	E	Kevin Bartlett, Doug Chivas	Alfa Romeo 1600 GTA	
1969	European Touring Car Championship (Drivers) (3)	Division 2	Spartaco Dini	Alfa Romeo 1600 GTA	
1969	European Touring Car Championship (Manufacturers) (3)	Division 2	Various	Alfa Romeo 1600 GTA	
1969	Australian Drivers' Championship (2)	Australian National Formula	Kevin Bartlett	Mildren Mono Alfa Romeo	
1969	Bathurst 500 (3)	E	Kevin Bartlett, Len Goodwin	Alfa Romeo 1750 GTV	
1970	European Touring Car Championship (Drivers) (4)	Division 3	Toine Hezemans	Alfa Romeo 2000 GTAm	
1970	European Touring Car Championship (Manufacturers) (4)	Division 3	Various	Alfa Romeo 2000 GTAm	
1970	Trans-Am Series (2)	Under 2-Liter Manufacturers	Various	Alfa Romeo GTA	
1971	European Touring Car Championship (Manufacturers) (5)	Division 1	Various	Alfa Romeo 1300 GTA Junior	
1971	European Touring Car Championship (Manufacturers) (6)	Division 2	Various	Alfa Romeo Giulia Sprint GT	
1971	Targa Florio (9)		Nino Vaccarella, Toine Hezemans	Alfa Romeo 33/3	
1972	European Touring Car Championship (Manufacturers) (7)	Division 1	Various	Alfa Romeo Giulia GTA 1300 Junior	
1972	Italian Formula Three Championship		Vittorio Brambilla	Birel 71-Alfa Romeo Wainer	
1973	Bathurst 1000 (4)	B	Ray Harrison, Mal Robertson	Alfa Romeo 2000 GTV	
1974	Bathurst 1000 (5)	1301–2000cc	Ray Gulson, David Crowther	Alfa Romeo 2000 GTV	
1975	Targa Florio (10)		Nino Vaccarella, Arturo Merzario	Alfa Romeo 33TT12	
1975	World Championship for Makes		Arturo Merzario, Vittorio Brambilla, Jacques Laffite, Henri Pescarolo, Derek Bell, Jochen Mass	Alfa Romeo 33TT12	
1975	Bathurst 1000 (6)	B	Marie-Claude Beaumont, John Leffler	Alfa Romeo 2000 GTV	
1976	European Touring Car Championship (Manufacturers) (8)	Division 1	Various	Alfa Romeo Giulia GTA 1300 Junior	
1976	European Touring Car Championship (Manufacturers) (9)	Division 2	Various	Alfa Romeo Alfasud Sprint	
1977	European Touring Car Championship (Manufacturers) (10)	Division 1	Various	Alfa Romeo 2000 GTV Alfa Romeo Alfasud Sprint	
1977	World Championship for Sports Cars		Arturo Merzario, Jean-Pierre Jarier, Vittorio Brambilla, Federico Salvati	Alfa Romeo 33SC12	
1977	Bathurst 1000 (7)	Up to 2000cc	Derek Bell, Garry Leggatt	Alfa Romeo 2000 GTV	
1978	European Touring Car Championship (Manufacturers) (11)	Division 1	Various	Alfa Romeo Alfasud Sprint	
1979	Italian Formula Three Championship (2)		Piercarlo Ghinzani	March-Alfa Romeo 793	
1979	European Touring Car Championship (Manufacturers) (12)	Division 1	Various	Alfa Romeo Alfasud Sprint	
1980	FIA Formula 3 European Championship		Michele Alboreto	March 803-Alfa Romeo	
1981	FIA Formula 3 European Championship (2)		Mauro Baldi	March 803-Alfa Romeo	
1981	French Formula Three Championship		Philippe Streiff	Martini MK34-Alfa Romeo	
1981	Italian Formula Three Championship (3)		Eddy Bianchi	Martini MK37-Alfa Romeo	
1982	European Touring Car Championship (Manufacturers) (13)	Division 2	Various	Alfa Romeo Alfetta GTV6	
1982	FIA Formula 3 European Championship (3)		Oscar Larrauri	Euroracing 101-Alfa Romeo	
1982	Italian Formula Three Championship (4)		Enzo Coloni	March-Alfa Romeo 813, Ralt RT3-Alfa Romeo	
1983	British Touring Car Championship		Andy Rouse	Alfa Romeo GTV6	
1983	European Touring Car Championship (Manufacturers) (14)	Division 2	Various	Alfa Romeo Alfetta GTV6	
1983	French Supertouring Championship		Alain Cudini	Alfa Romeo GTV6	
1983	FIA Formula 3 European Championship (4)		Pierluigi Martini	Ralt RT3-Alfa Romeo	
1983	French Formula Three Championship (2)		Michel Ferté	Martini MK39-Alfa Romeo	
1983	Italian Formula Three Championship (5)		Ivan Capelli	Ralt RT3-Alfa Romeo	
1983	Swiss Formula Three Championship		Hans-Peter Kaufmann	Ralt-Alfa Romeo	
1984	European Touring Car Championship (Manufacturers) (15)	Division 2	Various	Alfa Romeo Alfetta GTV6	
1984	FIA Formula 3 European Championship (5)		Ivan Capelli	Martini MK42-Alfa Romeo	
1984	French Formula Three Championship (3)		Olivier Grouillard	Martini MK42-Alfa Romeo	
1984	French Supertouring Championship (2)		Dany Snobeck	Alfa Romeo GTV6	
1984	German Formula Three Championship		Kurt Thiim	Ralt RT3-Alfa Romeo	
1984	Italian Formula Three Championship (6)		Alessandro Santin	Ralt RT3-Alfa Romeo	
1985	European Touring Car Championship (Manufacturers) (16)	Division 2	Various	Alfa Romeo Alfetta GTV6	
1985	FIA European Formula 3 Cup (6)		Alex Caffi	Dallara F385-Alfa Romeo	
1985	French Formula Three Championship (4)		Pierre-Henri Raphanel	Martini MK45-Alfa Romeo	
1985	Bathurst 1000 (8)	B	Colin Bond, Gregg Hansford	Alfa Romeo GTV6	
1986	FIA European Formula 3 Cup (7)		Stefano Modena	Reynard 863-Alfa Romeo	
1986	Italian Formula Three Championship (7)		Nicola Larini	Dallara F386-Alfa Romeo	
1987	Australian Rally Championship		Greg Carr	Alfa Romeo GTV6	
1987	Australian Touring Car Championship (3)	Under 2500cc	Colin Bond	Alfa Romeo 75 Turbo	
1987	FIA European Formula 3 Cup (8)		Steve Kempton	Reynard 873-Alfa Romeo	
1987	French Formula Three Championship (5)		Jean Alesi	Martini MK52-Alfa Romeo, Dallara F386-Alfa Romeo, Dallara F387-Alfa Romeo	
1987	Italian Formula Three Championship (8)		Enrico Bertaggia	Dallara F387-Alfa Romeo	
1987	Swedish Formula 3 Championship		Michael Johansson	Ralt RT31-Alfa Romeo	
1988	Austria Formula 3 Cup		Karl Wendlinger	Ralt RT32-Alfa Romeo	
1988	Formula 3 Sudamericana		Juan Carlos Giacchino	Dallara F388-Alfa Romeo	
1988	French Formula Three Championship (6)		Érik Comas	Dallara F388-Alfa Romeo	
1988	Giro d'Italia automobilistico (2)		Riccardo Patrese, Miki Biasion, Tiziano Siviero	Alfa Romeo 75 Turbo IMSA	
1988	Italian Formula Three Championship (9)		Emanuele Naspetti	Dallara F388-Alfa Romeo	
1988	Italian Superturismo Championship		Gianfranco Brancatelli	Alfa Romeo 75 Turbo	
1988	Swedish Formula 3 Championship (2)		Michael Johansson	Ralt RT31-Alfa Romeo	
1988	Brazilian Formula Three Championship		Christian Fittipaldi	Reynard 883-Alfa Romeo	
1988	Spanish Supertouring Championship		Luis Villamil	Alfa Romeo 33, Alfa Romeo 75 3.0	
1989	FIA European Formula 3 Cup (9)		Gianni Morbidelli	Dallara 389-Alfa Romeo	
1989	Formula 3 Sudamericana (2)		Gabriel Furlán	Dallara F388-Alfa Romeo	
1989	French Formula Three Championship (7)		Jean-Marc Gounon	Reynard 893-Alfa Romeo	
1989	German Formula Three Championship (2)		Karl Wendlinger	Ralt RT33-Alfa Romeo	
1989	Giro d'Italia automobilistico (3)		Giorgio Francia, Dario Cerrato, Giuseppe Cerri	Alfa Romeo 75 Turbo IMSA	
1989	Italian Formula Three Championship (10)		Gianni Morbidelli	Dallara F389-Alfa Romeo	
1989	Swiss Formula Three Championship (2)		Jacques Isler	Foitek Dallara-Alfa Romeo	
1990	FIA European Formula 3 Cup (10)		Alessandro Zanardi	Dallara 390-Alfa Romeo	
1990	Formula 3 Sudamericana (3)		Christian Fittipaldi	Reynard 883-Alfa Romeo	
1990	Italian Formula Three Championship (11)		Roberto Colciago	Reynard 903-Alfa Romeo	
1990	Mexican Formula Three Championship		Carlos Guerrero	Reynard 903-Alfa Romeo	
1990	Swiss Formula Three Championship (3)		Jo Zeller	Zeller Ralt-Alfa Romeo	
1991	Chilean Formula Three Championship		Giuseppe Bacigalupo	Alfa Romeo 33 1.400 c.c.	
1991	Spanish Supertouring Championship (2)		Luis Pérez-Sala	Alfa Romeo 75 America	
1991	Swiss Formula Three Championship (4)		Jo Zeller	Zeller Ralt-Alfa Romeo	
1992	Austria Formula 3 Cup (2)		Philipp Peter	Dallara F392-Alfa Romeo	
1992	Chilean Formula Three Championship (2)		Giuseppe Bacigalupo	Alfa Romeo 33 1.400 c.c.	
1992	Italian Superturismo Championship (2)		Nicola Larini	Alfa Romeo 155 GTA	
1992	Mexican Formula Three Championship (2)		César Tiberio Jiménez	Reynard 903-Alfa Romeo	
1992	Swiss Formula Three Championship (5)		Jo Zeller	Zeller Ralt-Alfa Romeo	
1993	Chilean Formula Three Championship (3)		Giuseppe Bacigalupo	Alfa Romeo 33 1.400 c.c.	
1993	Deutsche Tourenwagen Meisterschaft		Nicola Larini	Alfa Romeo 155 V6 Ti	
1993	Mexican Formula Three Championship (3)		Carlos Guerrero	Reynard 903 + 933-Alfa Romeo	
1994	Australian Sports Sedan Championship (3)		Brian Smith	Alfa Romeo Alfetta GTV-Chevrolet	
1994	British Touring Car Championship		Gabriele Tarquini	Alfa Romeo 155 TS	
1994	Mexican Formula Three Championship (4)		Carlos Guerrero	Reynard 933-Alfa Romeo	
1994	Spanish Supertouring Championship (3)		Adrián Campos	Alfa Romeo 155 TS	
1995	Mexican Formula Three Championship (5)		Derek Higgins	Reynard 933-Alfa Romeo	
1995	Spanish Supertouring Championship (4)		Luis Villamil	Alfa Romeo 155 TS	
1996	Mexican Formula Three Championship (6)		Rod MacLeod	Reynard 933-Alfa Romeo	
1997	Mexican Formula Three Championship (7)		Derek Higgins	Reynard 933-Alfa Romeo	
1997	Spanish Supertouring Championship (5)		Fabrizio Giovanardi	Alfa Romeo 155 TS	
1998	Italian Superturismo Championship (3)		Fabrizio Giovanardi	Alfa Romeo 156	
1999	Italian Superturismo Championship (4)		Fabrizio Giovanardi	Alfa Romeo 156	
2000	European Touring Car Championship (Drivers)		Fabrizio Giovanardi	Alfa Romeo 156 D2	
2000	European Touring Car Championship (Manufacturers)		Various	Alfa Romeo 156 D2	
2001	European Touring Car Championship (Drivers) (2)	Super Touring	Fabrizio Giovanardi	Alfa Romeo 156 D2	
2001	European Touring Car Championship (Manufacturers) (2)		Various	Alfa Romeo 156 D2	
2002	European Touring Car Championship (Drivers) (3)		Fabrizio Giovanardi	Alfa Romeo 156 GTA	
2002	European Touring Car Championship (Manufacturers) (3)		Various	Alfa Romeo 156 GTA	
2003	European Touring Car Championship (Drivers) (4)		Gabriele Tarquini	Alfa Romeo 156 GTA	
2003	Italian Superturismo Championship (5)		Salvatore Tavano	Alfa Romeo 147	
2004	Italian Superturismo Championship (6)		Adriano de Micheli	Alfa Romeo 147	
2005	European Touring Car Cup	Super Production/TC2	Lorenzo Falessi	Alfa Romeo 147 SP	
