= 1988 FIA European Formula 3 Cup =

Race at the Nürburgring

Race details
Date	25 September 1988
Official name	FIA European Formula 3 Cup
Location	Nürburg, Germany
Course	Permanent racing facility 4.556 km (2.831 mi)
Distance	Race; 31 laps, 141.236 km (87.760 mi)
- Race

Pole Position
Driver	(Italy) Gianni Morbidelli	Forti Corse
- 1:04.70

Fastest Lap
Driver	(West Germany) Joachim Winkelhock	W.T.S. Racing
- 1:16.69

Podium
First	(West Germany) Joachim Winkelhock	W.T.S. Racing
Second	(Italy) Mauro Martini	Mauro Martini
Third	(Italy) Emanuele Naspetti	Forti Corse

The 1988 FIA European Formula 3 Cup was the fourth European Formula 3 Cup race and the first to be held at the Nürburgring on 25 September 1988. The race was won by German driver Joachim Winkelhock, driving for W.T.S. Racing Liqui Moly Equipe, who finished ahead of Italians Mauro Martini and Emanuele Naspetti.

== Teams and drivers ==
1988 Entry List
Team	No.	Driver	Chassis	Engine
W.T.S. Racing Liqui Moly Equipe	1	(West Germany) Joachim Winkelhock	Reynard 883	Volkswagen
Volkswagen Motorsport	2	(West Germany) Otto Rensing	Reynard 883	Volkswagen
Volkswagen Motorsport	4	(West Germany) Frank Krämer	BSR KS388	Volkswagen
Team Sonax Autopflege	3	(West Germany) Frank Biela	Martini MK55	Volkswagen
Style Auto Racing Team	5	(West Germany) Wolfgang Kaufmann	Dallara F388	Volkswagen
Malte Bongers Motorsport	6	(West Germany) Michael Bartels	Reynard 883	Volkswagen
Mönninghoff Racing Sympathik Cosmetics	7	(West Germany) Michael Roppes	Reynard 883	Volkswagen
Forti Corse	11	(Italy) Emanuele Naspetti	Dallara F388	Alfa Romeo
Forti Corse	12	(Italy) Gianni Morbidelli	Dallara F388	Alfa Romeo
Prema Racing	14	(Italy) Fabrizio Giovanardi	Reynard 883	Alfa Romeo
Mauro Martini	15	(Italy) Mauro Martini	Dallara F388	Alfa Romeo
Trivellato Racing Team	17	(Italy) Felice Tedeschi	Dallara F388	Alfa Romeo
Team Escolette	18	(Italy) Gianfranco Tacchino	Reynard 883	Volkswagen
Swedish Lions	21	(Sweden) Kenny Bräck	Reynard 883	Toyota
Swedish Lions	41	(Sweden) Håkan Olausson	Reynard 873	Toyota
Gruyere Racing Team	31	(Switzerland) Roland Franzen	Dallara F388	Volkswagen
JSK Generalbau AG	32	(Switzerland) Hanspeter Kaufmann	Dallara F388	Volkswagen
JSK Generalbau AG	33	(Switzerland) René Wartmann	Reynard 873	Volkswagen
Bernal Torantriebe	34	(Switzerland) Gianni Bianchi	Dallara F387	Volkswagen
Svend Hansen	42	(Denmark) Svend Hansen	Reynard 873	Volkswagen

Preceded by 1987 FIA European Formula 3 Cup	FIA European Formula 3 Cup; 1988	Succeeded by 1989 FIA European Formula 3 Cup
