= FIA European Formula 3 Cup =

- Category: Single seater racing
- Region: Europe
- Inaugural season: 1985
- Folded: 2004
- Classes: Formula Three

The FIA European Formula 3 Cup was a Formula Three race held annually in Europe from 1985 to 1990 and 1999 to 2004. The Cup was awarded by the Fédération Internationale de l'Automobile, the world governing body for motorsport, as its main Formula Three title in Europe after the European Formula 3 Championship was cancelled in 1984. A different venue in Europe hosted the Cup each year during its initial run, while the revival in 1999 saw the Cup between the headline event of the Pau Grand Prix.

In 2003, this event was not treated as a non-championship event, since it counted points to the first Formula 3 Euro Series season.

In 2004, the race was again a non-championship event, and this was the last year that the FIA European Formula 3 Cup took place.

== European Formula 3 Cup winners ==
| Year | Circuit | Champion | Team | Car |
|---|---|---|---|---|
| 1985 | Circuit Paul Ricard, France | (Italy) Alex Caffi | (Italy) Gulf-Coloni | Dallara F385/Alfa Romeo Novamotor |
| 1986 | Autodromo Enzo e Dino Ferrari, Italy | (Italy) Stefano Modena | (Italy) Euroteam | Reynard 863/Alfa Romeo Novamotor |
| 1987 | Silverstone Circuit, Great Britain | (United Kingdom) Steve Kempton | (United Kingdom) Reynard R&D | Reynard 873/Alfa Romeo Novamotor |
| 1988 | Nürburgring, West Germany | (Germany) Joachim Winkelhock | (Germany) WTS-Liqui Moly | Reynard 883/Volkswagen Spiess |
| 1989 | Misano World Circuit, Italy | (Italy) Gianni Morbidelli | (Italy) Forti Corse | Dallara F389/Alfa Romeo Novamotor |
| 1990 | Bugatti Circuit, France | (Italy) Alessandro Zanardi | (Italy) RC Motorsport | Dallara F390/Alfa Romeo Novamotor |
| 1991–1998 | Race not held | | | |
| 1999 | Pau Grand Prix, France | (France) Benoît Tréluyer | (France) Signature Compétition | Dallara F399/Renault Sodemo |
| 2000 | Pau Grand Prix, France | (France) Jonathan Cochet | (France) Signature-Elf | Dallara F300/Renault Sodemo |
| 2001 | Pau Grand Prix, France | (United Kingdom) Anthony Davidson | (United Kingdom) Carlin Motorsport | Dallara F301/Honda Mugen |
| 2002 | Pau Grand Prix, France | (France) Renaud Derlot | (France) ARTA-Signature-Elf | Dallara F302/Renault Sodemo |
| 2003 | Pau Grand Prix, France | (Australia) Ryan Briscoe | (Italy) Prema Powerteam | Dallara F303/Opel |
| 2004 | Circuit de Spa-Francorchamps, Belgium | (United Kingdom) Adam Carroll | (United Kingdom) P1 Motorsport | Dallara F304/Honda Mugen |

== Performance by country ==
| Rank | Country | Winning driver | Winning team |
|---|---|---|---|
| 1 | Italy | 4 (1985, 1986, 1989, 1990) | 5 (1985, 1986, 1989, 1990, 2003) |
| 2 | France | 3 (1999, 2000, 2002) | 3 (1999, 2000, 2002) |
| 2 | Great Britain | 3 (1987, 2001, 2004) | 3 (1987, 2001, 2004) |
| 4 | Germany | 1 (1988) | 1 (1988) |
| 5 | Australia | 1 (2003) | |

== See also ==
- FIA European Formula Three Championship
- Formula 3 Euro Series
