= 1987 FIA European Formula 3 Cup =

Race details
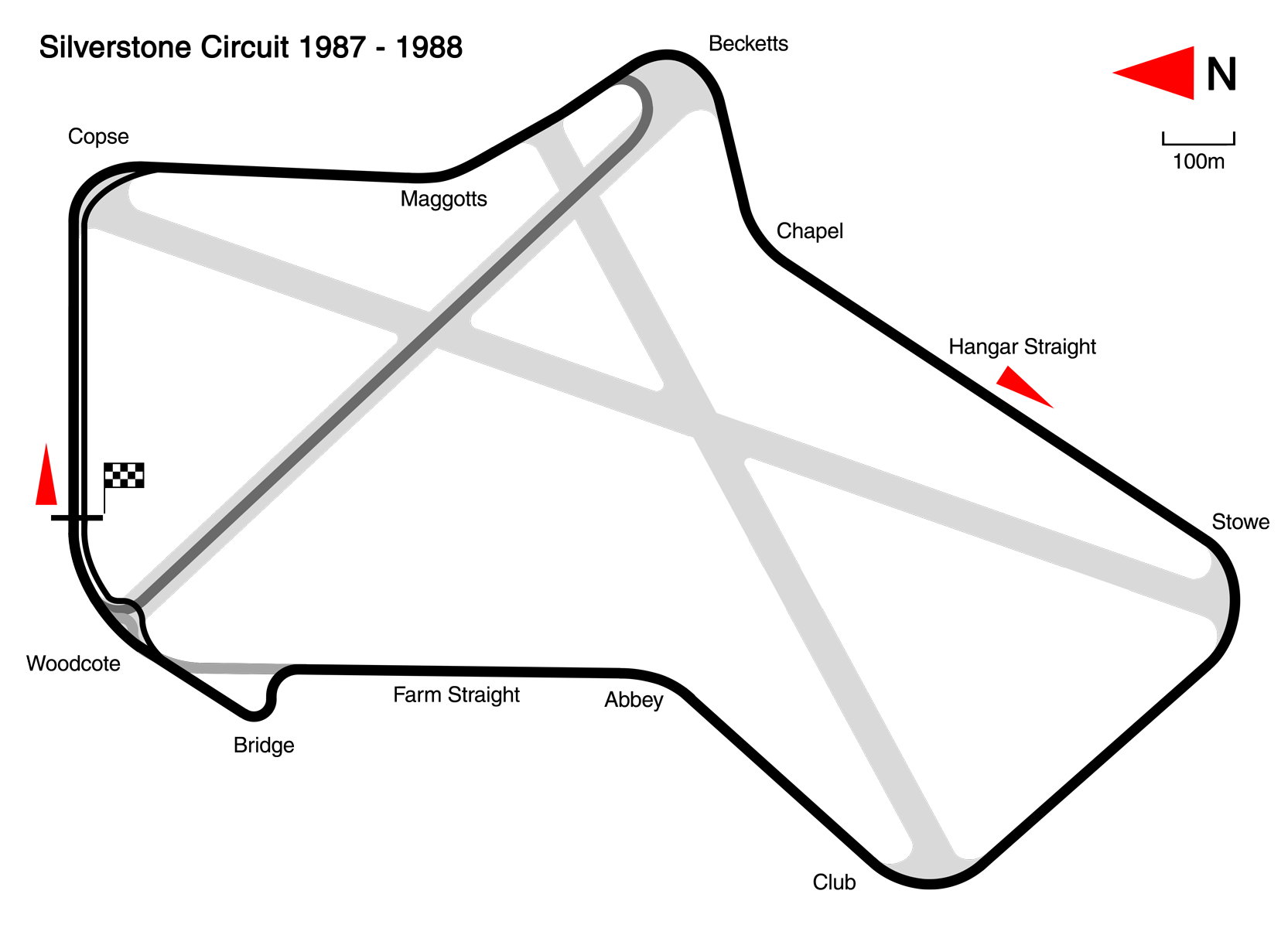
Date	4 October 1987
Official name	FIA European Formula Three Cup
Location	Silverstone, United Kingdom
Course	Permanent racing facility 4.778 km (2.969 mi)
Distance	Race; 22 laps, 105.116 km (65.316 mi)
- Race

Pole Position
Driver	(United Kingdom) Steve Kempton	Reynard R&D
- 1:29.04

Fastest Lap
Driver	(Switzerland) Philippe Favre	Reynard R&D
- 1:29.62

Podium
First	(United Kingdom) Steve Kempton	Reynard R&D
Second	(Italy) Alberto Apicella	Venturini Racing
Third	(France) Bertrand Gachot	West Surrey Racing

The 1987 FIA European Formula Three Cup was the third European Formula Three Cup race and the first to be held at the Silverstone Circuit on October 4, 1987. The race was won by Briton Steve Kempton, driving for Reynard R&D outfit, who finished ahead of Italian Alberto Apicella and Belgian Bertrand Gachot.

== Drivers and teams ==
1987 Entry List
Team	No	Driver	Chassis	Engine
Madgwick Motorsport	1	(United Kingdom) Perry McCarthy	Reynard 873	Alfa Romeo
Madgwick Motorsport	10	(Sweden) Thomas Danielsson	Reynard 873	Alfa Romeo
Eddie Jordan Racing	2	(United Kingdom) Johnny Herbert	Reynard 873	Volkswagen
West Surrey Racing	11	(Belgium) Bertrand Gachot	Ralt RT31	Alfa Romeo
Ronnie Grant	14	(United Kingdom) Ronnie Grant	Ralt RT30	Volkswagen
Mike Rowe Racing	15	(Netherlands) Peter Kox	Reynard 873	Toyota
RGS Racing	16	(United Kingdom) Gary Ward	Ralt RT30	Volkswagen
Giles Butterfield	17	(United Kingdom) Giles Butterfield	Reynard 863	Volkswagen
Reynard R&D	18	(United Kingdom) Steve Kempton	Reynard 873	Alfa Romeo
Reynard R&D	19	(Switzerland) Philippe Favre	Reynard 873	Alfa Romeo
Alan Docking Racing	20	(Republic of Ireland) Mark Galvin	Reynard 873	Alfa Romeo
Enrico Bertaggia	30	(Italy) Enrico Bertaggia	Dallara 387	Alfa Romeo
Mauro Martini	31	(Italy) Mauro Martini	Reynard 873	Alfa Romeo
Euroteam s.r.l.	32	(Italy) Eugenio Visco	Reynard 873	Alfa Romeo
Venturini Racing	33	(Italy) Alberto Apicella	Dallara 387	Alfa Romeo
Cesare Carabelli	34	(Italy) Cesare Carabelli	Reynard 873	Volkswagen
Schübel Rennsport	40	(Germany) Bernd Schneider	Dallara 387	Volkswagen
Schübel Rennsport	49	(Hungary) Csaba Kesjár	Dallara 387	Volkswagen
WTS Racing Team	41	(Germany) Joachim Winkelhock	Dallara 387	Volkswagen
Volkswagen Motorsport	42	(Argentina) Víctor Rosso	Ralt RT31	Volkswagen
Volkswagen Motorsport	46	(Germany) Peter Zakowski	Ralt RT31	Volkswagen
Gipimo Corse	43	(Norway) Harald Huysman	Dallara 387	Alfa Romeo
Otto Rensing	44	(Germany) Otto Rensing	Martini MK49	Volkswagen
Frank Biela	45	(Germany) Frank Biela	Reynard 873	Volkswagen
The Swedish Lions	50	(Sweden) Håkan Olausson	Reynard 873	Volkswagen
The Swedish Lions	51	(Sweden) Johann Rajamäki	Ralt RT30	Volkswagen
Racing Motor Service	60	(Switzerland) Rolf Kuhn	Reynard 873	Volkswagen
Formel Rennsport Club	61	(Switzerland) Jo Zeller	Ralt RT30	Toyota
Formel Rennsport Club	65	(Switzerland) Fritz Augsburger	Reynard 853	Volkswagen
Squadra Foitek	62	(Switzerland) Jacques Isler	Dallara 386	Volkswagen
JSK Generalbau	63	(Switzerland) Hans-Peter Kaufmann	Dallara 386	Volkswagen
Ecurie des 3 Chevrons	64	(Switzerland) Christophe Hurni	Swica 387	Volkswagen

== Classification ==
=== Qualifying ===
Pos	No	Driver	Team	Time	Gap
1	18	(United Kingdom) Steve Kempton	Reynard R&D	1:29.04	
2	1	(United Kingdom) Perry McCarthy	Madgwick Motorsport	1:29.08	+ 0.04 s
3	40	(Germany) Bernd Schneider	Schübel Rennsport	1:29.14	+ 0.10 s
4	33	(Italy) Alberto Apicella	Venturini Racing	1:29.51	+ 0.47 s
5	10	(Sweden) Thomas Danielsson	Madgwick Motorsport	1:29.57	+ 0.53 s
6	2	(United Kingdom) Johnny Herbert	Eddie Jordan Racing	1:29.59	+ 0.55 s
7	32	(Italy) Eugenio Visco	Euroteam s.r.l.	1:29.64	+ 0.60 s
8	31	(Italy) Mauro Martini	Mauro Martini	1:29.81	+ 0.77 s
9	11	(Belgium) Bertrand Gachot	West Surrey Racing	1:29.82	+ 0.78 s
10	19	(France) Philippe Favre	Reynard R&D	1:29.89	+ 0.85 s
11	45	(Germany) Frank Biela	Frank Biela	1:30.09	+ 1.05 s
12	41	(Germany) Joachim Winkelhock	WTS Racing Team	1:30.36	+ 1.32 s
13	20	(Republic of Ireland) Mark Galvin	Alan Docking Racing	1:30.50	+ 1.46 s
14	43	(Norway) Harald Huysman	Gipimo Corse	1:30.81	+ 1.77 s
15	17	(United Kingdom) Giles Butterfield	Giles Butterfield	1:30.92	+ 1.89 s
16	42	(Argentina) Víctor Rosso	Volkswagen Motorsport	1:30.98	+ 1.95 s
17	63	(Switzerland) Hans-Peter Kaufmann	JSK Generalbau	1:31.09	+ 2.05 s
18	60	(Switzerland) Rolf Kuhn	Racing Motor Service	1:31.12	+ 2.08 s
19	46	(Germany) Peter Zakowski	Volkswagen Motorsport	1:31.25	+ 2.21 s
20	44	(Germany) Otto Rensing	Otto Rensing	1:31.26	+ 2.22 s
21	16	(United Kingdom) Gary Ward	RGS Racing	1:31.30	+ 2.26 s
22	49	(Hungary) Csaba Kesjár	Schübel Rennsport	1:31.25	+ 2.23 s
23	61	(Switzerland) Jo Zeller	Formel Rennsport Club	1:31.81	+ 2.77 s
24	50	(Sweden) Håkan Olausson	The Swedish Lions	1:31.89	+ 2.85 s
25	64	(Switzerland) Christophe Hurni	Ecurie des 3 Chevrons	1:32.34	+ 3.30 s
26	51	(Sweden) Johann Rajamäki	The Swedish Lions	1:32.45	+ 3.41 s
27	14	(United Kingdom) Ronnie Grant	Ronnie Grant	1:32.63	+ 3.59 s
28	65	(Switzerland) Fritz Augsburger	Formel Rennsport Club	1:34.08	+ 5.04 s

=== Race ===
Pos	No	Driver	Team	Laps	Time / Retired	Grid
1	18	(United Kingdom) Steve Kempton	Reynard R&D	22	33min 20.54sec	1
2	33	(Italy) Alberto Apicella	Venturini Racing	22	+ 7.54 s	4
3	11	(Belgium) Bertrand Gachot	West Surrey Racing	22	+ 12.54 s	9
4	10	(Sweden) Thomas Danielsson	Madgwick Motorsport	22	+ 17.35 s	5
5	31	(Italy) Mauro Martini	Mauro Martini	22	+ 23.99 s	8
6	45	(Germany) Frank Biela	Frank Biela	22	+ 35.38 s	11
7	20	(Republic of Ireland) Mark Galvin	Alan Docking Racing	22	+ 39.49 s	13
8	41	(Germany) Joachim Winkelhock	WTS Racing Team	22	+ 42.22 s	12
9	17	(United Kingdom) Giles Butterfield	Giles Butterfield	22	+ 44.09 s	15
10	43	(Norway) Harald Huysman	Gipimo Corse	22	+ 44.65 s	14
11	63	(Switzerland) Hans-Peter Kaufmann	Giles JSK Generalbau	22	+ 50.89 s	17
12	61	(Switzerland) Jo Zeller	Formel Rennsport Club	22	+ 53.55 s	23
13	46	(Germany) Peter Zakowski	Volkswagen Motorsport	22	+ 54.54 s	19
14	16	(United Kingdom) Gary Ward	RGS Racing	22	+ 55.17 s	21
15	44	(Germany) Otto Rensing	Otto Rensing	22	+ 1:05.24 s	20
16	49	(Hungary) Csaba Kesjár	Schübel Rennsport	22	+ 1:06.50 s	22
17	51	(Sweden) Johann Rajamäki	The Swedish Lions	22	+ 1:27.05 s	26
18	40	(Germany) Bernd Schneider	Schübel Rennsport	21	+ 1 Lap	3
19	19	(France) Philippe Favre	Reynard R&D	21	+ 1 Lap	10
20	64	(Switzerland) Christophe Hurni	Ecurie des 3 Chevrons	21	+ 1 Lap	25
Ret	2	(United Kingdom) Johnny Herbert	Eddie Jordan Racing	18	Retired	6
Ret	50	(Sweden) Håkan Olausson	The Swedish Lions	17	Retired	24
Ret	1	(United Kingdom) Perry McCarthy	Madgwick Motorsport	15	Retired	2
Ret	32	(Italy) Eugenio Visco	Euroteam s.r.l.	7	Retired	7
Ret	60	(Switzerland) Rolf Kuhn	Racing Motor Service	6	Retired	18
Ret	14	(United Kingdom) Ronnie Grant	Ronnie Grant	4	Retired	27
Ret	65	(Switzerland) Fritz Augsburger	Formel Rennsport Club	3	Retired	28
DNS	15	(Netherlands) Peter Kox	Mike Rowe Racing		Did Not Start	
DNS	30	(Italy) Enrico Bertaggia	Enrico Bertaggia		Did Not Start	
DNS	34	(Italy) Cesare Carrabelli	Cesare Carabelli		Did Not Start	
DNS	62	(Switzerland) Jacques Isler	Squadra Foitek		Did Not Start	

== See also ==
FIA European Formula Three Cup

Preceded by 1986 FIA European Formula Three Cup	FIA European Formula Three Cup; 1987	Succeeded by 1988 FIA European Formula Three Cup
