= 1990 FIA European Formula 3 Cup =

1990 FIA race

Race details
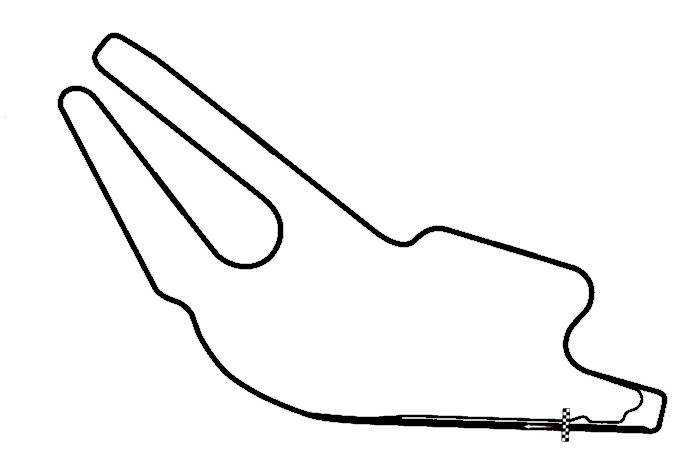
Date	23 September 1990
Official name	FIA European Formula Three Cup
Location	Le Mans, France
Course	Permanent racing facility 4.43 km (2.75 mi)
Distance	Race; 22 laps, 97.46 km (60.56 mi)
- Race

Pole Position
Driver	(Germany) Michael Schumacher	West WTS Racing
- 1:39.36

Fastest Lap
Driver	(Germany) Michael Schumacher	West WTS Racing
- 1:56.27

Podium
First	(Italy) Alessandro Zanardi	RC Motorsport
Second	(Italy) Mirko Savoldi	Prema Powerteam
Third	(France) Yvan Muller	Giovanni Bonanno

The 1990 FIA European Formula Three Cup was the sixth European Formula Three Cup race and the first to be held at the Bugatti Circuit at Le Mans on September 23, 1990. The race was won by Italian Alessandro Zanardi, driving for RC Motorsport outfit after Michael Schumacher was disqualified from the race and stripped of his race win. Italian Mirko Savoldi and Frenchman Yvan Muller completed the podium. Only eleven drivers entered the race. It was the last season of the FIA European Formula 3 Cup, before it reappeared in 1999.

== Drivers and teams ==
1990 Entry List
Team	No	Driver	Chassis	Engine
Forti Corse	1	(Italy) Domenico Schiattarella	Dallara 390	Alfa Romeo
Forti Corse	48	(Italy) Fabiano Vandone	Dallara 390	Alfa Romeo
Italracing F3	2	(Italy) Mirko Savoldi	Dallara 390	Alfa Romeo
RC Motorsport	3	(Italy) Alessandro Zanardi	Dallara 390	Alfa Romeo
West WTS Racing	5	(Germany) Michael Schumacher	Reynard 903	Volkswagen-Opel
Volkswagen Racing	6	(Germany) Otto Rensing	Ralt RT34	Volkswagen
ONS Nachwuchsteam; Bongers Motorsport	7	(Germany) Jörg Müller	Dallara 390	Alfa Romeo
Venturini Racing	15	(Italy) Massimiliano Angelelli	Dallara 390	Alfa Romeo
Alan Howell	21	(France) Yvan Muller	Ralt RT34	Alfa Romeo
Jacky Carmignon	24	(France) Jérôme Policand	Dallara 390	Alfa Romeo
Prema Powerteam	43	(Italy) Roberto Colciago	Reynard 903	Alfa Romeo

== Classification ==
=== Qualifying ===
Pos	No	Driver	Team	Time	Gap
1	5	(Germany) Michael Schumacher	West WTS Racing	1:39.36	
2	15	(Italy) Massimiliano Angelelli	Venturini Racing	1:39.69	+ 0.33 s
3	3	(Italy) Alessandro Zanardi	RC Motorsport	1:39.96	+ 0.60 s
4	1	(Italy) Domenico Schiattarella	Forti Corse	1:40.13	+ 0.77 s
5	2	(Italy) Mirko Savoldi	Italracing F3	1:40.24	+ 0.88 s
6	43	(Italy) Roberto Colciago	Prema Powerteam	1:40.27	+ 0.91 s
7	21	(France) Yvan Muller	Alan Howell	1:40.40	+ 1.24 s
8	6	(Germany) Otto Rensing	Volkswagen Racing	1:40.78	+ 1.42 s
9	24	(France) Jérôme Policand	Jacky Carmignon	1:41.04	+ 1.68 s
10	48	(Italy) Fabiano Vandone	Forti Corse	1:42.20	+ 2.84 s

=== Race ===
Pos	No	Driver	Team	Laps	Time / Retired	Grid
1	3	(Italy) Alessandro Zanardi	RC Motorsport	22	43min 28.26sec	3
2	2	(Italy) Mirko Savoldi	Italracing F3	22	+ 21.81 s	5
3	21	(France) Yvan Muller	Alan Howell	22	+ 32.10 s	7
4	24	(France) Jérôme Policand	Jacky Carmignon	22	+ 54.31 s	9
5	48	(Italy) Fabiano Vandone	Forti Corse	22	+ 1:10.76 s	10
DSQ	5	(Germany) Michael Schumacher	West WTS Racing	22	Disqualified	1
Ret	1	(Italy) Domenico Schiattarella	Forti Corse	17	Retired	4
Ret	43	(Italy) Roberto Colciago	Prema Powerteam	11	Retired	6
DNS	15	(Italy) Massimiliano Angelelli	Venturini Racing		Did not start	
DNS	6	(Germany) Otto Rensing	Volkswagen Racing		Did not start	
DNQ	7	(Germany) Jörg Müller	ONS Nachwuchsteam		Did not qualify	

== See also ==
FIA European Formula Three Cup

Preceded by 1989 FIA European Formula Three Cup	FIA European Formula Three Cup; 1990	Succeeded by 1999 FIA European Formula Three Cup
