= 1989 FIA European Formula 3 Cup =

Race details
Date	15 October 1989
Official name	FIA European Formula Three Cup
Location	Misano World Circuit Marco Simoncelli, Misano Adriatico, Province of Rimini, Emilia-Romagna, Italy
Course	Permanent racing facility 3.488 km (2.167 mi)
Distance	Race; 29 laps, 101.152 km (62.853 mi)
- Race

Pole Position
Driver	(Italy) Antonio Tamburini	Prema Powerteam
- 1:12.88

Fastest Lap
Driver	(Italy) Gianni Morbidelli	Forti Corse
- 1:13.92

Podium
First	(Italy) Gianni Morbidelli	Forti Corse
Second	(Italy) Antonio Tamburini	Prema Powerteam
Third	(Italy) Giovanni Bonanno	Giovanni Bonanno

The 1989 FIA European Formula Three Cup was the fifth European Formula Three Cup race and the first to be held at the Misano World Circuit on October 15, 1989. The race was won by Italian Gianni Morbidelli, driving for Forti Corse outfit, who finished ahead of fellow Italians Antonio Tamburini and Giovanni Bonanno.

== Drivers and teams ==
1989 Entry List
Team	No	Driver	Chassis	Engine
Forti Corse	1	(Italy) Gianni Morbidelli	Dallara 389	Alfa Romeo
Forti Corse	48	(Italy) Fabiano Vandone	Dallara 389	Alfa Romeo
Roberto Colciago	2	(Italy) Roberto Colciago	Reynard 893	Alfa Romeo
Prema Powerteam	3	(Italy) Antonio Tamburini	Reynard 893	Alfa Romeo
Giovanni Bonanno	4	(Italy) Giovanni Bonanno	Dallara 389	Alfa Romeo
Ecurie des Ordons	5	(Switzerland) Roland Bossy	Reynard 893	Alfa Romeo
Christophe Hurni	6	(Switzerland) Christophe Hurni	Reynard 893	Alfa Romeo
Euroteam	7	(Italy) Andrea Montermini	Reynard 893	Alfa Romeo
Wittwer Racing	8	(Switzerland) Rolf Kuhn	Reynard 893	Volkswagen
EC Motorsport	9	(Italy) Eugenio Visco	Dallara 389	Alfa Romeo
Formel Rennsport Club	11	(Switzerland) Jo Zeller	Ralt RT32	Toyota
Formel Rennsport Club	18	(Switzerland) Gianni Bianchi	Dallara 389	Volkswagen
Formel Rennsport Club	19	(Switzerland) Rene Wartmann	Dallara 389	Volkswagen
Jacques Isler	12	(Switzerland) Jacques Isler	Dallara 388	Alfa Romeo
WTS Racing	13	(Germany) Michael Schumacher	Reynard 893	Volkswagen
Bongers Motorsport	14	(Germany) Michael Bartels	Reynard 893	Volkswagen
Style Auto Racing Team	15	(Germany) Wolfgang Kaufmann	Dallara 388	Volkswagen
Peter Zakowski Racing	16	(Germany) Peter Zakowski	Reynard 893	Volkswagen
Ecurie Elf	20	(France) Yvan Muller	Dallara 389	Alfa Romeo
Erre 3 Racing	21	(Italy) Alessandro Zanardi	Ralt RT33	Toyota
Becsport	22	(United Kingdom) John Alcorn	Reynard 893	Toyota
Svend Hansen	23	(Denmark) Svend Hansen	Reynard 883	Volkswagen
Olivier Beretta	31	(Monaco) Olivier Beretta	Dallara 389	Alfa Romeo
Luigi Monti	32	(Italy) Fabrizio Bettini	Dallara 389	Alfa Romeo

== Classification ==
=== Qualifying ===
Pos	No	Driver	Team	Time	Gap
1	3	(Italy) Antonio Tamburini	Prema Powerteam	1:12.88	
2	7	(Italy) Andrea Montermini	Euroteam	1:13.01	+ 0.13 s
3	1	(Italy) Gianni Morbidelli	Forti Corse	1:13.19	+ 0.31 s
4	2	(Italy) Roberto Colciago	Roberto Colciago	1:13.37	+ 0.49 s
5	4	(Italy) Giovanni Bonanno	Giovanni Bonanno	1:13.38	+ 0.50 s
6	48	(Italy) Fabiano Vandone	Forti Corse	1:13.42	+ 0.54 s
7	9	(Italy) Eugenio Visco	EC Motorsport	1:13.47	+ 0.59 s
8	20	(France) Yvan Muller	Ecurie Elf	1:13.59	+ 0.71 s
9	13	(Germany) Michael Schumacher	WTS Racing	1:13.83	+ 0.95 s
10	31	(Monaco) Olivier Beretta	Olivier Beretta	1:13.86	+ 0.98 s
11	21	(Italy) Alessandro Zanardi	Erre 3 Racing	1:13.90	+ 1.02 s
12	32	(Italy) Fabrizio Bettini	Luigi Monti	1:14.07	+ 1.19 s
13	15	(Germany) Wolfgang Kaufmann	Style Auto Racing Team	1:14.16	+ 1.28 s
14	12	(Switzerland) Jacques Isler	Jacques Isler	1:14.61	+ 1.73 s
15	14	(Germany) Michael Bartels	Bongers Motorsport	1:14.77	+ 1.89 s
16	19	(Switzerland) Rene Wartmann	Formel Rennsport Club	1:15.11	+ 2.23 s
17	5	(Switzerland) Roland Bossy	Ecurie des Ordons	1:15.55	+ 2.67 s
18	6	(Switzerland) Christophe Hurni	Christophe Hurni	1:15.69	+ 2.81 s
19	23	(Denmark) Svend Hansen	Svend Hansen	1:15.76	+ 2.88 s
20	8	(Switzerland) Rolf Kuhn	Wittwer Racing	1:16.14	+ 3.26 s
21	11	(Switzerland) Jo Zeller	Formel Rennsport Club	1:16.64	+ 3.76 s
22	18	(Switzerland) Gianni Bianchi	Formel Rennsport Club	1:17.30	+ 4.42 s

=== Race ===
Pos	No	Driver	Team	Laps	Time / Retired	Grid
1	1	(Italy) Gianni Morbidelli	Forti Corse	29	36min 09.80sec	3
2	3	(Italy) Antonio Tamburini	Prema Powerteam	29	+ 3.47 s	1
3	4	(Italy) Giovanni Bonanno	Giovanni Bonanno	29	+ 11.21 s	5
4	2	(Italy) Roberto Colciago	Roberto Colciago	29	+ 12.75 s	4
5	20	(France) Yvan Muller	Ecurie Elf	29	+ 32.30 s	8
6	32	(Italy) Fabrizio Bettini	Luigi Monti	29	+ 33.70 s	12
7	21	(Italy) Alessandro Zanardi	Erre 3 Racing	29	+ 34.6 s	11
8	31	(Monaco) Olivier Beretta	Olivier Beretta	29	+ 44.79 s	10
9	14	(Germany) Michael Bartels	Bongers Motorsport	29	+ 45.01 s	15
10	23	(Denmark) Svend Hansen	Svend Hansen	29	+ 50.26 s	18
11	5	(Switzerland) Roland Bossy	Ecurie des Ordons	29	+ 50.72 s	17
12	19	(Switzerland) Rene Wartmann	Formel Rennsport Club	29	+ 53.14 s	16
13	11	(Switzerland) Jo Zeller	Formel Rennsport Club	29	+ 1:21.97 s	21
14	18	(Switzerland) Gianni Bianchi	Formel Rennsport Club	28	+ 1 Lap	22
15	15	(Germany) Wolfgang Kaufmann	Style Auto Racing Team	28	+ 1 Lap	13
Ret	6	(Switzerland) Christophe Hurni	Christophe Hurni	25	Retired	18
Ret	13	(Germany) Michael Schumacher	WTS Racing	24	Retired	9
DSQ	12	(Switzerland) Jacques Isler	Jacques Isler	15	Disqualified	14
Ret	9	(Italy) Eugenio Visco	EC Motorsport	14	Retired	7
Ret	48	(Italy) Fabiano Vandone	Forti Corse	13	Retired	6
Ret	7	(Italy) Andrea Montermini	Euroteam	12	Retired	2
Ret	8	(Switzerland) Rolf Kuhn	Wittwer Racing	1	Retired	20

== See also ==
FIA European Formula Three Cup

Preceded by 1988 FIA European Formula Three Cup	FIA European Formula Three Cup; 1989	Succeeded by 1990 FIA European Formula Three Cup
