= Astier =

Astier is a French surname. Notable people with the surname include:

- Alexandre Astier (born 1974), a French writer, director, editor and actor
- Alexandre Astier (born 1968), a French writer on the religions in India
- Lilian Astier (born 1978), a French professional soccer player
- Marcel Astier (1885–1947), a French politician
- Pauline Astier (born 2002), a French basketball player
- Raphaël Astier (born 1976), a French modern pentathlete
