= 2018 FIA R-GT Cup =

2018 FIA R-GT Cup
| Previous: | 2017 | Next: | 2019 |

The 2018 FIA R-GT Cup was the fourth edition of the FIA rally cup for GT cars in Group R-GT. The cup was contested over 5 tarmac rounds from the WRC, the ERC and the Rallye International du Valais. The competition was won by French driver Raphaël Astier in an Abarth 124 R-GT.

== Calendar ==
The calendar for the 2018 season features five tarmac rallies: two selected tarmac rounds from the WRC, two selected rounds from the ERC and the 59. Rallye International du Valais from the TER series.

| Round | Dates | Rally name | Series |
|---|---|---|---|
| 1 | 25–28 January | (Monaco) 86ème Rallye Automobile Monte-Carlo | WRC |
| 2 | 5–8 April | (France) 61. Tour de Corse | WRC |
| 3 | 20–21 July | (Italy) 6. Rally di Roma Capitale | ERC |
| 4 | 24–26 August | (Czech Republic) 46. Barum Czech Rally Zlín | ERC |
| 5 | 18–20 October | (Switzerland) 59. Rallye International du Valais | TER |

== Entries ==
| Manufacturer | Car | Entrant | Tyre | Driver | Co-driver | Rounds |
|---|---|---|---|---|---|---|
| Abarth | Abarth 124 R-GT | (France) Raphaël Astier | MI | (France) Raphaël Astier | (France) Frédéric Vauclaire | 2–5 |
| Abarth | Abarth 124 R-GT | (France) Nicolas Ciamin | MI | (France) Nicolas Ciamin | (France) Thibault de la Haye | 1 |
| Abarth | Abarth 124 R-GT | (France) Philippe Gache | MI | (France) Philippe Gache | (France) Nicolas Riviere | 2 |
| Abarth | Abarth 124 R-GT | (Italy) Andrea Modanesi | MI | (Italy) Andrea Modanesi | (Switzerland) Menchini | 2 |
| Abarth | Abarth 124 R-GT | (Italy) Andrea Modanesi | MI | (Italy) Andrea Modanesi | (Italy) Roberto Mometti | 3 |
| Abarth | Abarth 124 R-GT | (Italy) Andrea Nucita | DM | (Italy) Andrea Nucita | (Italy) Marco Vozzo | 1 |
| Abarth | Abarth 124 R-GT | (Italy) Andrea Nucita | MI | (Italy) Andrea Nucita | (Italy) Marco Vozzo | 2–5 |
| Abarth | Abarth 124 R-GT | (Czech Republic) Martin Rada | MI | (Czech Republic) Martin Rada | (Czech Republic) Jaroslav Jugas | 4 |
| Abarth | Abarth 124 R-GT | (Romania) Simone Tempestini | MI | (Romania) Simone Tempestini | (Romania) Sergiu Itu | 4 |
| Abarth | Abarth 124 R-GT | (Switzerland) Beat Wyssen | DM | (Switzerland) Beat Wyssen | (Switzerland) Janine Wyssen | 5 |
| Porsche | Porsche 997 GT3 | (Republic of Ireland) John Coyne | MI | (Republic of Ireland) John Coyne | (Republic of Ireland) Stephen Joyce | 2 |
| Porsche | Porsche 997 GT3 | (Czech Republic) Petr Nešetřil | P | (Czech Republic) Petr Nešetřil | (Czech Republic) Jiří Černoch | 4 |
| Porsche | Porsche 997 GT3 | (France) Marc Valliccioni | MI | (France) Marc Valliccioni | (France) Marie-Josée Cardi | 2 |

== Results ==
| Round | Rally name | Podium finishers | | | | | Statistics | | | |
| Round | Rally name | Pos. | Ovl. | Driver | Car | Time | Stages | Length | Starters | Finishers |
|---|---|---|---|---|---|---|---|---|---|---|
| 1 | (Monaco) 86ème Rallye Automobile de Monte-Carlo (25–28 January) — Results and report | no drivers classified | | | | | 17 | 388.59 km | 2 | 0 |
| 2 | 61ème Tour de Corse – Rallye de France (5–8 April) — Results and report | 1 | 17 | (France) Raphaël Astier | Abarth 124 R-GT | 3:53:15.8 | 12 | 333.48 km | 6 | 4 |
| 2 | 61ème Tour de Corse – Rallye de France (5–8 April) — Results and report | 2 | 21 | (Italy) Andrea Nucita | Abarth 124 R-GT | +5:25.0 | 12 | 333.48 km | 6 | 4 |
| 2 | 61ème Tour de Corse – Rallye de France (5–8 April) — Results and report | 3 | 30 | (France) Philippe Gache | Abarth 124 R-GT | +14:30.9 | 12 | 333.48 km | 6 | 4 |
| 3 | (Italy) 6. Rally di Roma Capitale (20–22 July) — Results and report | 1 | 35 | (France) Raphaël Astier | Abarth 124 R-GT | 2:09:45.7 | 15 | 205.97 km | 3 | 3 |
| 3 | (Italy) 6. Rally di Roma Capitale (20–22 July) — Results and report | 2 | 45 | (Italy) Andrea Modanesi | Abarth 124 R-GT | +44:40.4 | 15 | 205.97 km | 3 | 3 |
| 3 | (Italy) 6. Rally di Roma Capitale (20–22 July) — Results and report | 3 | 46 | (Italy) Andrea Nucita | Abarth 124 R-GT | +48:33.7 | 15 | 205.97 km | 3 | 3 |
| 4 | (Czech Republic) 48. Barum Czech Rally Zlín (24–26 August) — Results and report | 1 | 19 | (France) Raphaël Astier | Abarth 124 R-GT | 2:21:08.0 | 15 | 212.73 km | 5 | 3 |
| 4 | (Czech Republic) 48. Barum Czech Rally Zlín (24–26 August) — Results and report | 2 | 23 | (Romania) Simone Tempestini | Abarth 124 R-GT | +51.5 | 15 | 212.73 km | 5 | 3 |
| 4 | (Czech Republic) 48. Barum Czech Rally Zlín (24–26 August) — Results and report | 3 | 29 | (Czech Republic) Petr Nešetřil | Porsche 997 GT3 | +14:27.5 | 15 | 212.73 km | 5 | 3 |
| 5 | (Switzerland) 59. Rallye International du Valais (18–20 October) | 1 | 9 | (France) Raphaël Astier | Abarth 124 R-GT | 2:36:29.8 | 18 | 244.33 km | 3 | 2 |
| 5 | (Switzerland) 59. Rallye International du Valais (18–20 October) | 2 | 29 | (Switzerland) Beat Wyssen | Abarth 124 R-GT | +17:25.6 | 18 | 244.33 km | 3 | 2 |
| 5 | (Switzerland) 59. Rallye International du Valais (18–20 October) | No other entries finished | | | | | 18 | 244.33 km | 3 | 2 |

== Standings ==
Points are awarded to the top ten classified finishers.

=== FIA R-GT Cup for Drivers ===
| Position | 1st | 2nd | 3rd | 4th | 5th | 6th | 7th | 8th | 9th | 10th |
| Points | 25 | 18 | 15 | 12 | 10 | 8 | 6 | 4 | 2 | 1 |

| Pos. | Driver | MON (Monaco) | FRA (France) | ITA (Italy) | CZE (Czech Republic) | SUI (Switzerland) | Points |
|---|---|---|---|---|---|---|---|
| 1 | (France) Raphaël Astier | | 1 | 1 | 1 | 1 | 100 |
| 2 | (Italy) Andrea Nucita | Ret | 2 | 3 | Ret | Ret | 33 |
| 3 | (Italy) Andrea Modanesi | | 4 | 2 | | | 30 |
| 4 | (Romania) Simone Tempestini | | | | 2 | | 18 |
| = | (Switzerland) Beat Wyssen | | | | | 2 | 18 |
| 6 | (France) Philippe Gache | | 3 | | | | 15 |
| = | (Czech Republic) Petr Nešetřil | | | | 3 | | 15 |

Key
| Colour | Result |
|---|---|
| Gold | Winner |
| Silver | 2nd place |
| Bronze | 3rd place |
| Green | Points finish |
| Blue | Non-points finish |
| Blue | Non-classified finish (NC) |
| Purple | Did not finish (Ret) |
| Black | Excluded (EX) |
| Black | Disqualified (DSQ) |
| White | Did not start (DNS) |
| White | Cancelled (C) |
| Blank | Withdrew entry from the event (WD) |

=== FIA R-GT Cup for Manufacturers ===
| Position | 1st | 2nd | 3rd | 4th | 5th | 6th | 7th | 8th | 9th | 10th |
| Points | 25 | 18 | 15 | 12 | 10 | 8 | 6 | 4 | 2 | 1 |

| Pos. | Entrant | MON (Monaco) | FRA (France) | ITA (Italy) | CZE (Czech Republic) | SUI (Switzerland) | Points |
|---|---|---|---|---|---|---|---|
| 1 | (Italy) Abarth | | 1 | 1 | 1 | 1 | 100 |
| 2 | (Germany) Porsche | | | 3 | | | 15 |
| Pos. | Entrant | MON (Monaco) | FRA (France) | ITA (Italy) | CZE (Czech Republic) | SUI (Switzerland) | Points |

Key
| Colour | Result |
|---|---|
| Gold | Winner |
| Silver | 2nd place |
| Bronze | 3rd place |
| Green | Points finish |
| Blue | Non-points finish |
| Blue | Non-classified finish (NC) |
| Purple | Did not finish (Ret) |
| Black | Excluded (EX) |
| Black | Disqualified (DSQ) |
| White | Did not start (DNS) |
| White | Cancelled (C) |
| Blank | Withdrew entry from the event (WD) |
