= 2019 FIA R-GT Cup =

Motorsports championship

2019 FIA R-GT Cup
Previous:	2018	Next:	2020

The 2019 FIA R-GT Cup is the fifth edition of the FIA rally cup for GT cars in Group R-GT. The cup is being contested over 8 tarmac rounds from the WRC, the ERC and the Rallye International du Valais.

== Calendar ==
The calendar for the 2019 season features eight tarmac rallies: three rounds from the WRC, one round from the ERC, one rally from the TER series and three European national rallies.

Round	Dates	Rally name	Series
1	26–28 January	(Monaco) 87. Rallye Automobile Monte-Carlo	WRC
2	28–31 March	(France) 62. Tour de Corse	WRC
3	12–14 April	(Italy) 66. Rallye Sanremo	
4	7–8 June	(Croatia) 45. Delta Rally	
5	28–29 June	(Belgium) 55. Ypres Rally	
6	19–21 July	(Italy) 7. Rally di Roma Capitale	ERC
7	22–25 August	(Germany) 37. Rallye Deutschland	WRC
8	16–19 October	(Switzerland) 60. Rallye International du Valais	TER

== Entries ==
Manufacturer	Car	Entrant	Tyre	Driver	Co-driver	Rounds
Abarth	Abarth 124 R-GT	(Italy) Enrico Brazzoli	P	(Italy) Enrico Brazzoli	(Italy) Manuel Fenoli	1–3
Abarth	Abarth 124 R-GT	(Italy) Alberto Sassi	P	(Italy) Alberto Sassi	(Italy) Fabio Cangini	2
Abarth	Abarth 124 R-GT	(Poland) Poloński Dariusz	P	(Poland) Poloński Dariusz	(Poland) Sitek Łukasz	5
Abarth	Abarth 124 R-GT	(Italy) Melegari Zelindo	P	(Italy) Melegari Zelindo	(Italy) Bonato Corrado	5
Porsche	Porsche 997 Carrera	(Canada) Ian Crerar	MI	(Canada) Ian Crerar	(Canada) Christina Kröner	1–2
Porsche	Porsche 997 GT3	(Czech Republic) Petr Nešetřil	MI	(Czech Republic) Petr Nešetřil	(Czech Republic) Jiří Černoch	2

== Results ==
Round	Rally name	Podium finishers					Statistics			
Round	Rally name	Pos.	Ovl.	Driver	Car	Time	Stages	Length	Starters	Finishers
1	(Monaco) 87ème Rallye Automobile de Monte-Carlo (26–28 January) — Results and report	1		(Italy) Enrico Brazzoli	Abarth 124 R-GT	4:12:13.7				
2	62ème Tour de Corse – Rallye de France (28–31 March) — Results and report	1		(Italy) Enrico Brazzoli	Abarth 124 R-GT	3:59:17.0				

== Standings ==
Points are awarded to the top ten classified finishers.

=== FIA R-GT Cup for Drivers ===
Position	1st	2nd	3rd	4th	5th	6th	7th	8th	9th	10th
Points	25	18	15	12	10	8	6	4	2	1

=== FIA R-GT Cup for Manufacturers ===
Position	1st	2nd	3rd	4th	5th	6th	7th	8th	9th	10th
Points	25	18	15	12	10	8	6	4	2	1
