= 2017 FIA R-GT Cup =

2017 FIA R-GT Cup
Previous:	2016	Next:	2018

The 2017 FIA R-GT Cup was the third edition of the FIA rally cup for GT cars in Group R-GT. The cup was contested over 5 tarmac rounds from the WRC, the ERC and the Rallye International du Valais.

Thanks to the new Fiat 124 R-GT more drivers participated in the R-GT cup than in previous season. The overall winner was Romain Dumas driving a Porsche 997 GT3.

== Calendar ==
The calendar for the 2017 season featured five tarmac rallies: two selected tarmac rounds from the WRC, two selected rounds from the ERC and the 58. Rallye International du Valais from the TER series.

Round	Dates	Rally name	Series
1	18–22 January	(Monaco) 85ème Rallye Automobile Monte-Carlo	WRC
2	6–9 April	(France) 59. Tour de Corse	WRC
3	25–27 August	(Czech Republic) 47. Barum Czech Rally Zlín	ERC
4	15–17 September	(Italy) 5. Rally di Roma Capitale	ERC
5	26–28 October	(Switzerland) 58. Rallye International du Valais	TER

== Entries ==
Driver	Co-driver	Car	Rounds
(Italy) Fabio Andolfi	(Italy) Manuel Fenoli	Abarth 124 R-GT	1
(Italy) Fabrizio Andolfi Jr.	(Italy) Elia Ungaro	Abarth 124 R-GT	4–5
(France) François Delecour	(France) Dominique Savignoni	Abarth 124 R-GT	1–2
(France) Romain Dumas	(France) Gilles De Turckheim	Porsche 997 GT3	1
(France) Romain Dumas	(France) Patrick Chiappe	Porsche 997 GT3	2
(France) Romain Dumas	(France) Denis Giraudet	Porsche 997 GT3	3–5
(Italy) Gabriele Noberasco	(Italy) Daniele Michi	Abarth 124 R-GT	1
(Italy) Andrea Nucita	(Italy) Marco Vozzo	Abarth 124 R-GT	4–5
(Italy) Andrea Modanesi	(Italy) Daniele Renzetti	Abarth 124 R-GT	4

== Results ==
Round	Rally name	Podium finishers					Statistics			
Round	Rally name	Pos.	Ovl.	Driver	Car	Time	Stages	Length	Starters	Finishers
1	(Monaco) 85ème Rallye Automobile de Monte-Carlo (18–22 January) — Results and report	1	26	(France) Romain Dumas	Porsche 997 GT3	4:53:55.0	(17)^{1} 15	(382.65 km)^{1} 335.90 km	4	2
1	(Monaco) 85ème Rallye Automobile de Monte-Carlo (18–22 January) — Results and report	2	45	(Italy) Gabriele Noberasco	Abarth 124 R-GT	+26:14.2	(17)^{1} 15	(382.65 km)^{1} 335.90 km	4	2
2	60ème Tour de Corse – Rallye de France (7–9 April) — Results and report	1	18	(France) Romain Dumas	Porsche 997 GT3	3:45:49.7	10	316.76 km	2	2
2	60ème Tour de Corse – Rallye de France (7–9 April) — Results and report	2	19	(France) François Delecour	Abarth 124 R-GT	+4:44.0	10	316.76 km	2	2
3	(Czech Republic) 47. Barum Czech Rally Zlín (25–27 August) — Results and report	1	59	(France) Romain Dumas	Porsche 997 GT3	2:25:45.5	15	205.57 km	1	1
4	(Italy) 5. Rally di Roma Capitale (15–19 September) — Results and report	1	11	(Italy) Fabrizio Andolfi Jr.	Abarth 124 R-GT	2:09:30.4	12	202.48 km	4	4
4	(Italy) 5. Rally di Roma Capitale (15–19 September) — Results and report	2	15	(Italy) Andrea Nucita	Abarth 124 R-GT	+1:34.5	12	202.48 km	4	4
4	(Italy) 5. Rally di Roma Capitale (15–19 September) — Results and report	3	21	(Italy) Andrea Modanesi	Abarth 124 R-GT	+6:09.5	12	202.48 km	4	4
5	(Switzerland) 58. Rallye International du Valais (26–28 October) — Results and report	1	7	(France) Romain Dumas	Porsche 997 GT3	2:12:05.3	13	203.72 km	3	3
5	(Switzerland) 58. Rallye International du Valais (26–28 October) — Results and report	2	20	(Italy) Fabrizio Andolfi Jr.	Abarth 124 R-GT	+5:20.8	13	203.72 km	3	3
5	(Switzerland) 58. Rallye International du Valais (26–28 October) — Results and report	3	64	(Italy) Andrea Nucita	Abarth 124 R-GT	+55:14.2	13	203.72 km	3	3

Notes

- ^1 – The Monte Carlo Rally was shortened: the first stage was cancelled after an accident involving Hayden Paddon and a spectator. Overcrowding caused the sixteenth stage to be cancelled for safety reasons.

== Standings ==
Points are awarded to the top ten classified finishers.

=== FIA R-GT Cup for Drivers ===
Position	1st	2nd	3rd	4th	5th	6th	7th	8th	9th	10th
Points	25	18	15	12	10	8	6	4	2	1

Pos.	Driver	MON (Monaco)	FRA (France)	CZE (Czech Republic)	ITA (Italy)	SUI (Switzerland)	Points
1	(France) Romain Dumas	1	1	1	4	1	112
2	(Italy) Fabrizio Andolfi Jr.				1	2	43
3	(Italy) Andrea Nucita				2	3	33
4	(Italy) Gabriele Noberasco	2					18
=	(France) François Delecour	Ret	2				18
6	(Italy) Andrea Modanesi				3		15

Key
Colour	Result
Gold	Winner
Silver	2nd place
Bronze	3rd place
Green	Points finish
Blue	Non-points finish
Blue	Non-classified finish (NC)
Purple	Did not finish (Ret)
Black	Excluded (EX)
Black	Disqualified (DSQ)
White	Did not start (DNS)
White	Cancelled (C)
Blank	Withdrew entry from the event (WD)

=== FIA R-GT Cup for Manufacturers ===
Position	1st	2nd	3rd	4th	5th	6th	7th	8th	9th	10th
Points	25	18	15	12	10	8	6	4	2	1

Pos.	Entrant	MON (Monaco)	FRA (France)	CZE (Czech Republic)	ITA (Italy)	SUI (Switzerland)	Points
1	(Germany) Porsche	1	1	1	4	1	112
2	(Italy) Abarth	2	2		1	2	79
Pos.	Entrant	MON (Monaco)	FRA (France)	CZE (Czech Republic)	ITA (Italy)	SUI (Switzerland)	Points

Key
Colour	Result
Gold	Winner
Silver	2nd place
Bronze	3rd place
Green	Points finish
Blue	Non-points finish
Blue	Non-classified finish (NC)
Purple	Did not finish (Ret)
Black	Excluded (EX)
Black	Disqualified (DSQ)
White	Did not start (DNS)
White	Cancelled (C)
Blank	Withdrew entry from the event (WD)
