= 2020 FIA R-GT Cup =

2020 FIA R-GT Cup
Previous:	2019	Next:	2021

The 2020 FIA R-GT Cup is the sixth edition of the FIA rally cup for GT cars in Group R-GT. The cup is being contested over 2 tarmac rounds from the WRC and one the ERC.

== Calendar ==
The calendar for the 2020 season features eight tarmac rallies: two rounds from the WRC and one round from the ERC.

Round	Dates	Rally name	Series
1	24–26 January	(Monaco) 88. Rallye Automobile Monte-Carlo	WRC
	8–9 May	(France) Rallye Ain-Jura (Cancelled due to the COVID-19 pandemic)	
2	24–26 July	(Italy) 8. Rally di Roma Capitale	ERC
	16–18 October	(Germany) 38. Rallye Deutschland (Cancelled due to the COVID-19 pandemic)	WRC
	19–22 November	(Belgium) 56. Ypres Rally (Cancelled due to the COVID-19 pandemic)	
3	3–6 December	(Italy) ACI Rally Monza	WRC

== Entries ==
Manufacturer	Car	Entrant	Tyre	Driver	Co-driver	Rounds
Abarth	Abarth 124 R-GT	(Belgium) Luc Caprasse	P	(Belgium) Luc Caprasse	(Belgium) Herman Renaud	1
Abarth	Abarth 124 R-GT	(Italy) Andrea Mabellini	P	(Italy) Andrea Mabellini	(Italy) Nicola Arena	2–3
Abarth	Abarth 124 R-GT	(Italy) Roberto Gobbin	P	(Italy) Roberto Gobbin	(Italy) Alessandro Cervi	2–3
Abarth	Abarth 124 R-GT	(Poland) Dariusz Poloński	P	(Poland) Dariusz Poloński	(Poland) Łukasz Sitek	2
Porsche	Porsche 997 GT3	(Czech Republic) Petr Nešetřil	P	(Czech Republic) Petr Nešetřil	(Czech Republic) Jiří Černoch	2–3
Porsche	Porsche 997 GT3	(Italy) Alberto Sassi	MI	(Italy) Alberto Sassi	(Italy) Gabriele Romei	3
Porsche	Porsche 997 GT3	(Italy) Maurizio Rossi	MI	(Italy) Maurizio Rossi	(Italy) Giorgio Genovese	3
Alpine	Alpine A110 R-GT	(France) Pierre Ragues	MI	(France) Pierre Ragues	(France) Julien Pesenti	3

== Results ==
Round	Rally name	Podium finishers					Statistics			
Round	Rally name	Pos.	Ovl.	Driver	Car	Time	Stages	Length	Starters	Finishers
1	(Monaco) 88ème Rallye Automobile de Monte-Carlo (24–26 January) — Results and report	1		(Belgium) Luc Caprasse	Abarth 124 R-GT	4:35:42.5				
2	(Italy) 8. Rally di Roma Capitale (24–26 July) — Results and report	1		(Italy) Andrea Mabellini	Abarth 124 R-GT	2:17:02.8				
2	(Italy) 8. Rally di Roma Capitale (24–26 July) — Results and report	2		(Czech Republic) Petr Nešetřil	Porsche 997 GT3	+4:37.5				
2	(Italy) 8. Rally di Roma Capitale (24–26 July) — Results and report	3		(Italy) Roberto Gobbin	Abarth 124 R-GT	+6:19.9				
3	(Italy) ACI Rally Monza (3–6 December) — Results and report	1		(France) Pierre Ragues	Alpine A110 Rally	2:41:30.3				
3	(Italy) ACI Rally Monza (3–6 December) — Results and report	2		(Italy) Andrea Mabellini	Abarth 124 R-GT	2:42:08.4				
3	(Italy) ACI Rally Monza (3–6 December) — Results and report	3		(Italy) Alberto Sassi	Porsche 997 GT3	2:51:24.2				

== Standings ==
Points are awarded to the top ten classified finishers.

=== FIA R-GT Cup for Drivers ===
Position	1st	2nd	3rd	4th	5th	6th	7th	8th	9th	10th
Points	25	18	15	12	10	8	6	4	2	1

Pos.	Driver	MON (Monaco)	ITA (Italy)	ITA (Italy)	Points
1	(Italy) Andrea Mabellini		1	2	43
2	(Czech Republic) Petr Nešetřil		2	4	30
3	(Belgium) Luc Caprasse	1			25
4	(France) Pierre Ragues			1	25
5	(Italy) Roberto Gobbin		3	5	25
6	(Italy) Alberto Sassi			3	15
7	(Poland) Dariusz Poloński		4		12

Key
Colour	Result
Gold	Winner
Silver	2nd place
Bronze	3rd place
Green	Points finish
Blue	Non-points finish
Blue	Non-classified finish (NC)
Purple	Did not finish (Ret)
Black	Excluded (EX)
Black	Disqualified (DSQ)
White	Did not start (DNS)
White	Cancelled (C)
Blank	Withdrew entry from the event (WD)

=== FIA R-GT Cup for Manufacturers ===
Position	1st	2nd	3rd	4th	5th	6th	7th	8th	9th	10th
Points	25	18	15	12	10	8	6	4	2	1
