= Gernika Club =

Association football club in Spain

Coordinates: 43.323179°N 2.675089°W

Gernika
- Full name: Sociedad Deportiva Gernika Club
- Founded: 9 December 1922; 103 years ago
- Stadium: Urbieta
- Capacity: 3,000
- President: Koldo Zabala
- Head coach: Javi González
- League: Segunda Federación – Group 1
- 2025–26: Segunda Federación – Group 2, 11th of 18
- Website: gernikaclub.net
Home colours	Away colours

Sociedad Deportiva Gernika Club is a Spanish football team based in Gernika, in the autonomous community of Basque Country. Founded in 1922 it plays in Segunda Federación – Group 1, holding home games at Estadio Urbieta, with a capacity of 3,000 seats.

== Season to season ==
Season	Tier	Division	Place	Copa del Rey
1942–43	3	1ª Reg.	13th	
1943–44	4	1ª Reg.	1st	
1944–45	4	1ª Reg.	1st	
1945–46	4	1ª Reg.	2nd	
1946–47	4	1ª Reg.	1st	
1947–48	4	1ª Reg.	5th	
1948–49	4	1ª Reg.	13th	
1949–50	4	1ª Reg.	7th	
1950–51	4	1ª Reg.	8th	
1951–52	4	1ª Reg.	6th	
1952–53	4	1ª Reg.	10th	
1953–54	4	1ª Reg.	10th	
1954–55	4	1ª Reg.	11th	
1955–56	4	1ª Reg.	9th	
1956–57	4	1ª Reg.	8th	
1957–58	4	1ª Reg.	5th	
1958–59	4	1ª Reg.	14th	
1959–60	4	1ª Reg.	10th	
1960–61	4	1ª Reg.	5th	
1961–62	4	1ª Reg.	10th	

Season	Tier	Division	Place	Copa del Rey
1962–63	4	1ª Reg.	3rd	
1963–64	4	1ª Reg.	8th	
1964–65	4	1ª Reg.	10th	
1965–66	4	1ª Reg.	12th	
1966–67	4	1ª Reg.	11th	
1967–68	4	1ª Reg.	14th	
1968–69	5	1ª Reg.	12th	
1969–70	5	1ª Reg.	8th	
1970–71	5	1ª Reg.	1st	
1971–72	4	Reg. Pref.	3rd	
1972–73	4	Reg. Pref.	4th	
1973–74	4	Reg. Pref.	1st	
1974–75	3	3ª	9th	Second round
1975–76	3	3ª	7th	
1976–77	3	3ª	12th	Second round
1977–78	4	3ª	8th	First round
1978–79	4	3ª	4th	First round
1979–80	4	3ª	10th	First round
1980–81	4	3ª	16th	First round
1981–82	4	3ª	9th	

Season	Tier	Division	Place	Copa del Rey
1982–83	4	3ª	17th	
1983–84	4	3ª	14th	
1984–85	4	3ª	7th	
1985–86	4	3ª	10th	
1986–87	4	3ª	19th	
1987–88	4	3ª	10th	
1988–89	4	3ª	15th	
1989–90	4	3ª	16th	
1990–91	4	3ª	13th	
1991–92	4	3ª	11th	
1992–93	4	3ª	10th	
1993–94	4	3ª	3rd	
1994–95	3	2ª B	19th	
1995–96	4	3ª	3rd	
1996–97	3	2ª B	9th	First round
1997–98	3	2ª B	10th	
1998–99	3	2ª B	14th	
1999–2000	3	2ª B	13th	
2000–01	3	2ª B	15th	
2001–02	3	2ª B	12th	

Season	Tier	Division	Place	Copa del Rey
2002–03	3	2ª B	17th	
2003–04	4	3ª	8th	
2004–05	4	3ª	3rd	
2005–06	4	3ª	2nd	
2006–07	4	3ª	6th	
2007–08	4	3ª	2nd	
2008–09	4	3ª	6th	
2009–10	4	3ª	5th	
2010–11	4	3ª	14th	
2011–12	4	3ª	6th	
2012–13	4	3ª	5th	
2013–14	4	3ª	7th	
2014–15	4	3ª	2nd	
2015–16	3	2ª B	12th	
2016–17	3	2ª B	12th	
2017–18	3	2ª B	8th	
2018–19	3	2ª B	17th	Second round
2019–20	4	3ª	6th	
2020–21	4	3ª	1st / 1st	
2021–22	4	2ª RFEF	8th	First round

Season	Tier	Division	Place	Copa del Rey
2022–23	4	2ª Fed.	5th	Second round
2023–24	4	2ª Fed.	11th	First round
2024–25	4	2ª Fed.	12th	
2025–26	4	2ª Fed.	11th	
2026–27	4	2ª Fed.		

- 12 seasons in Segunda División B
- 6 seasons in Segunda Federación/Segunda División RFEF
- 35 seasons in Tercera División

== Current squad ==
As of 10 September 2026

Note: Flags indicate national team as defined under FIFA eligibility rules; some limited exceptions apply. Players may hold more than one non-FIFA nationality.

No.	Pos.	Nation	Player
1	GK	ESP	Oier Ariznabarreta
2	DF	ESP	Paul Francia
3	FW	ESP	Jon Etxeandía
4	DF	ESP	Iñigo Gomeza
5	DF	ESP	Joseba Pérez
6	DF	ESP	Xabier Arberas
7	FW	ESP	Anartz Rementería
8	FW	ESP	Julen Barrón
9	MF	ESP	Iñigo López
10	MF	ESP	Antton Fruniz
11	FW	ESP	Herri Torrontegui

No.	Pos.	Nation	Player
12	MF	ESP	Izan Gutiérrez
13	GK	ESP	Iraitz Gelbentzu
14	MF	ESP	Manex Aristi
17	FW	ESP	Kepa Vieites
18	DF	ESP	Aratz Barandiarán
19	FW	ESP	Jon Ortiz
20	DF	ESP	Beñat Leiza
21	DF	ESP	Carlos Marco
22	MF	ESP	Aser Bikandi
23	FW	ESP	Alexander Olea
24	FW	ESP	Iñigo Baqué

== Famous players ==
- (Equatorial Guinea) Gorka Luariz
- (France) Johann Duveau
- (Spain) Gorka Iraizoz
- (Spain) Aritz Lopez Garai
- (Spain) Koikili Lertxundi
