= Johann Duveau =

French footballer (born 1978)

Personal information
- Date of birth: 28 May 1978 (age 48)
- Place of birth: Sainte-Gemmes-d'Andigné, France
- Height: 1.68 m (5 ft 6 in)
- Positions: Midfielder; forward

Senior career*
Years	Team	Apps	(Gls)
1997–1998	Saint-Étienne	8	(1)
1998	→ Burgos (loan)	16	(0)
1998–2000	Marítimo	8	(0)
2000–2002	Torpedo Moscow	4	(1)
2002	Torredonjimeno	7	(0)
2002–2003	Gernika	12	(0)
2003–2004	Valenciennes	8	(0)
2004–2006	Saint-Pryvé		
- * Club domestic league appearances and goals

Johann Duveau (born 28 May 1978) is a French former professional footballer who played as a midfielder or forward.

== Career ==
Born in Sainte-Gemmes-d'Andigné, Duveau began playing football with the youth side of Saint-Étienne . After making only eight Ligue 2 appearances with Saint-Étienne's first team, he was sent with his compatriot Lilian Astier on a short-term loan to play for Burgos CF in Segunda División B.

Duveau had spells with C.S. Marítimo in the Portuguese Liga and Torredonjimeno CF and Gernika Club in Segunda División B, before finishing his career with Valenciennes FC and Saint-Pryvé Saint-Hilaire FC.
