= Group R-GT =

FIA rally car formula

Motor racing formula
- Category: Rally cars
- Country/Region: International
- Championships: WRC, R-GT Cup, Regional
- Inaugural: 2011
- Status: Active
- Drivetrain: Two Wheel Drive
- Power to weight: 3.4kg/hp
- Aptitude: Performance

In international rallying, Group R-GT (or sometimes Group RGT), is a formula of rally car defined by the FIA for GT cars introduced in 2011. Between 2014 and 2019 technical passports were issued for individual vehicles built by tuners. Since 2020 R-GT cars are required to be homologated by the manufacturer in common with other rally car formulae.

Internationally, R-GT cars compete in the FIA R-GT Cup, which is contested on tarmac rounds of the ERC and WRC. They are also eligible for the World Rally Championship and all the FIA's regional championships.

== Technical regulations ==
The technical regulations are described in 2019 Appendix J, article 256 of the FIA sporting regulations for cars with technical passports. For homologated cars since 2020 the relevant document is 2021 Appendix J, article 256. In both cases the cars must be series production GT cars that must be two-wheel driven. A car with four-wheel drive can be used as a basis but must be transformed into a 2WD version. All cars must be fitted with a restrictor with a diameter determined by the FIA in order to achieve a weight/power ratio of 3.4 kg/hp (4.6 kg/kw, 294bhp/tonne).

== History ==
=== Lotus Exige R-GT homologation ===
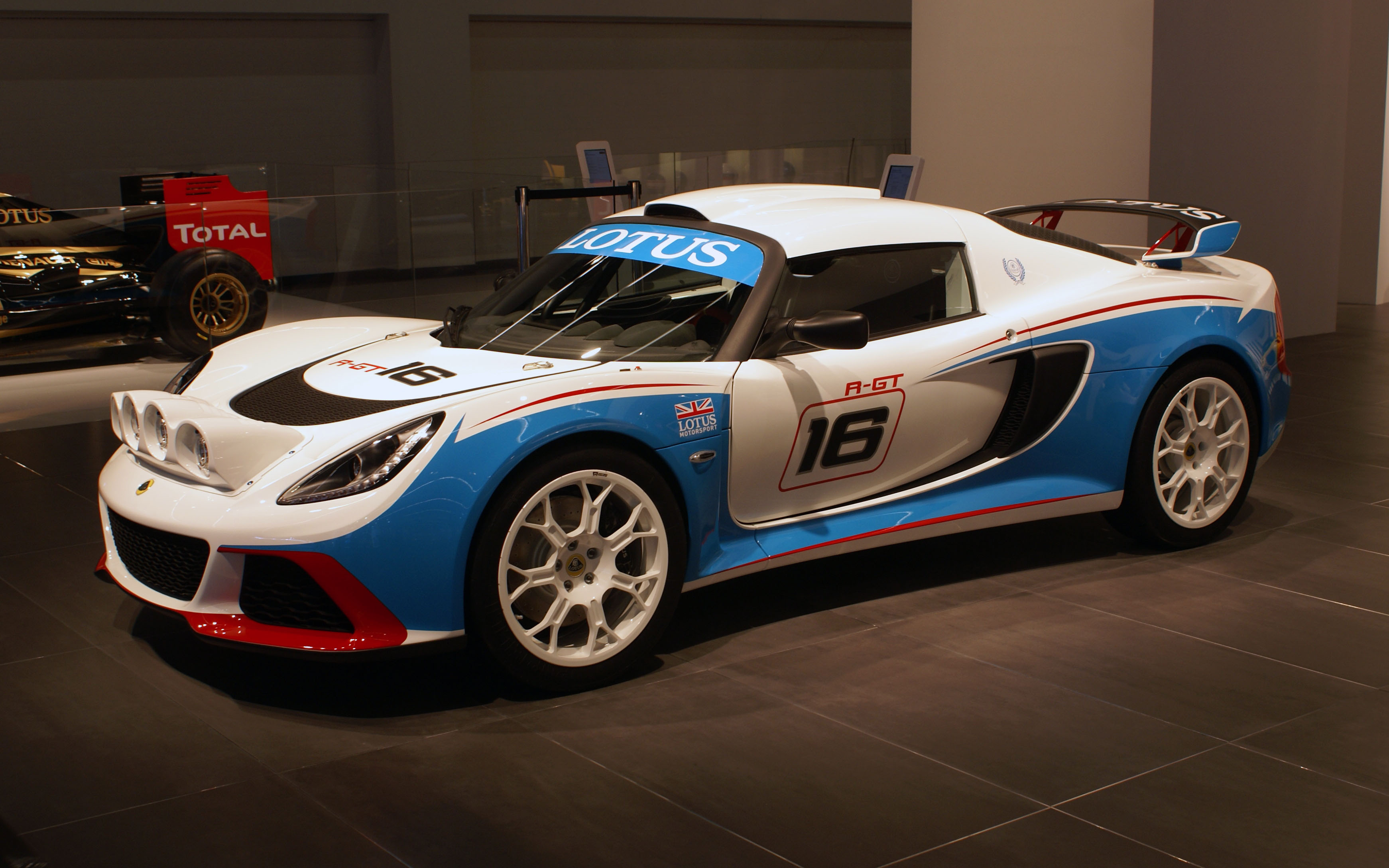
Lotus Exige R-GT

Lotus presented an R-GT version of their Exige S at the Frankfurt Motor Show 2011, but it wasn't until July 2012 before they achieved FIA homologation for what was the first car to compete in the R-GT category. The competition debut took place at the end of July at Rally Vinho da Madeira, with Portuguese driver Bernardo Sousa driving the car. After posting stage times in the top ten for the first two special stages, the car retired in the third stage because of an accident caused by an electronics glitch. After that, there were no further appearances of the Exige R-GT in international rallies and the homologation period lapsed in 2019.

=== Technical passports for individual cars ===
Between 2014 and 2019, the FIA issues technical passports for individual cars that are prepared to comply with the R-GT regulations. The first such appearance was Marc Duez who entered a Porsche 996 GT3 for the 2014 Monte Carlo Rally. He achieved some respectable stage times, but was forced to retire on the last day. At the 2014 Rallye Deutschland, Richard Tuthill entered with a modified Porsche 997 and finished as 27th (of 63 classified), thus realising the first finish of a Porsche at a WRC event since 1986.

=== FIA R-GT Cup ===
In 2015 the FIA organised the first international cup for R-GT cars. The first season was competed on five tarmac events of the WRC and ERC: Rallye Monte-Carlo, Ypres Rally, Rallye Deutschland, Rallye International du Valais and Tour de Corse. The championship was won by François Delecour in a Tuthill-prepared Porsche 997. In 2016 the R-GT cup was not contested due to a lack of participants but interest rose again in 2017 with the introduction of the Abarth 124 R-GT. The first event of the 2017 FIA R-GT Cup, the 2017 Monte Carlo Rally, saw 4 participants in the R-GT category.

=== Abarth 124 R-GT ===
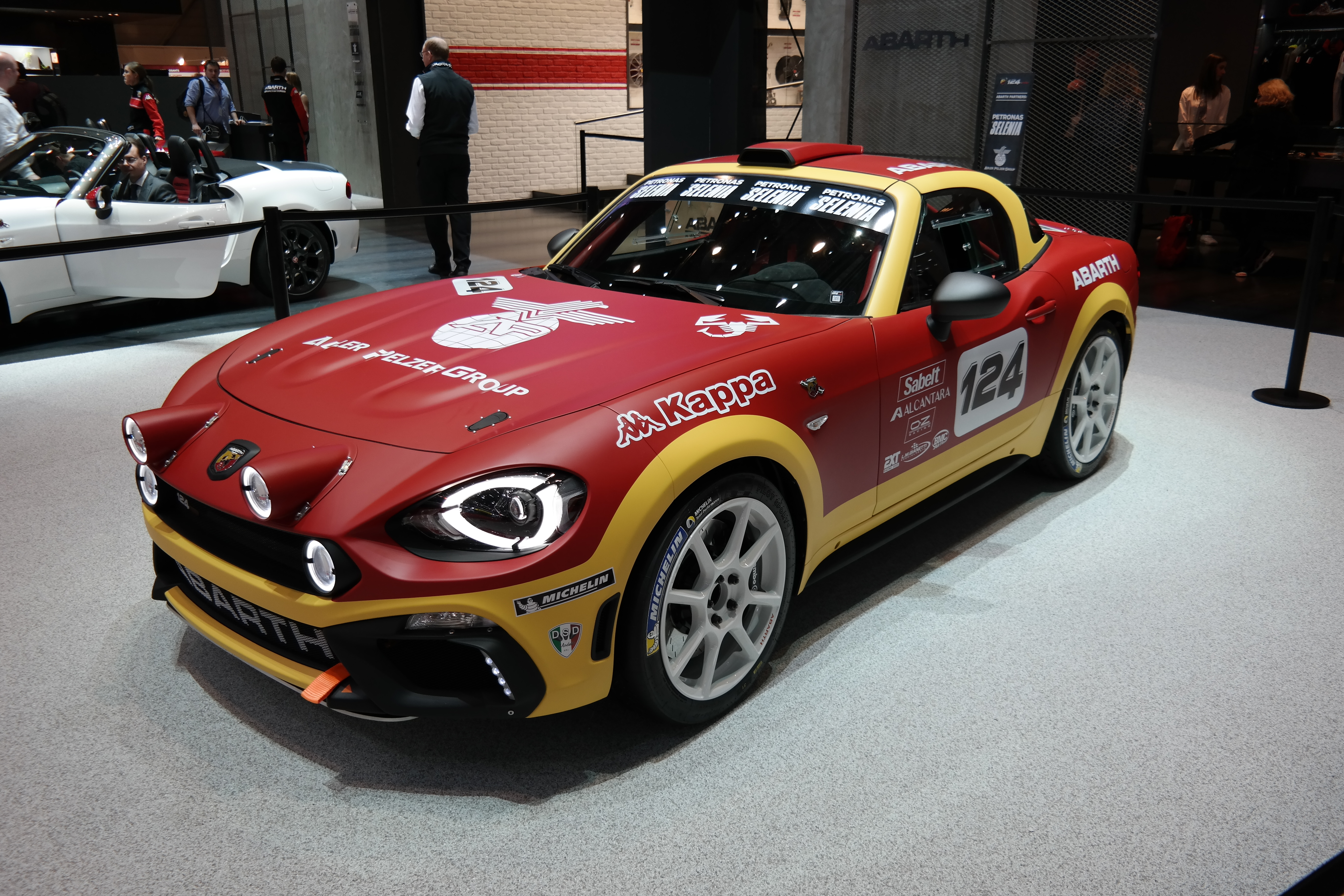
Abarth 124 R-GT

At the 2016 Geneva Motor Show the Abarth 124 Spider R-GT car was presented, and later made its debut at the 2017 Monte Carlo Rally. The entrants were François Delecour, Fabio Andolfi and Gabriele Noberasco. Two of the Abarths had to retire, but Noberasco classified second in the R-GT class.

Since 2019 the Abarth Rally Cup has run as a one-make series on selected rounds of the European Rally Championship. Title winners since its inaugural year have been Andrea Nucita (2019), Andrea Mabellini (2020) and Dariusz Poloński (2021).

=== Alpine A110 R-GT ===
The Alpine A110 Rally was announced in May 2019 and officially presented during the Rallye Mont-Blanc Morzine (5-7 September 2019). It was homologated by the FIA to Group R-GT specification in July 2020 and remains the only homologated R-GT car as of March 2024.

== Champions ==
=== FIA R-GT Cup ===
The R-GT Cup was first created in 2015 to allow GT cars to compete in rallying. With the FIA streamlining the classes of eligible cars by creating Group R, provisions were made to allow for GT cars to be entered, with the category known as R-GT. While the R-GT Cup was initially run in support of the World Rally Championship at selected events, later editions expanded the R-GT calendar to include rounds of the European Rally Championship.

Season	Events	Participants	Winning driver	Winning car
2015	5	4	(France) François Delecour	Porsche 997 GT3
2016	5	1	(France) Marc Valliccioni	Porsche 997 GT3
2017	5	7	(France) Romain Dumas	Porsche 997 GT3
2018	5	11	(France) Raphaël Astier	Abarth 124 R-GT
2019	8	6	(Italy) Enrico Brazzoli	Abarth 124 R-GT
2020	3	8	(Italy) Andrea Mabellini	Abarth 124 R-GT
2021	5	11	(France) Pierre Ragues	Alpine A110 Rally R-GT
2022	5		(France) Raphaël Astier	Alpine A110 Rally R-GT

=== Other starts in international rallies ===
Starts in R-GT Cup events are covered by the corresponding R-GT Cup season article and not listed below.

Season	Event	Series	Car model	Driver	Result
2012	(Portugal) Rally Vinho da Madeira	ERC	Lotus Exige R-GT	(Portugal) Bernardo Sousa	retired (accident)
2014	(Monaco) Monte Carlo Rally	WRC	Porsche 996 GT3	(Belgium) Marc Duez	retired (mechanical)
2014	Rally Finland	WRC	Porsche 997 GT3	(Finland) Jani Ylipahkala	retired (mechanical)
2014	(Germany) Rallye Deutschland	WRC	Porsche 997 GT3	(United Kingdom) Richard Tuthill	27th
2014	Rallye de France—Alsace	WRC	Porsche 997 GT3 RS 4.0	(France) Romain Dumas	19th
2014	Rallye de France—Alsace	WRC	Porsche 997 GT3	(France) François Delecour	37th
2014	(France) Tour de Corse	ERC	Porsche 997 GT3 RS 4.0	(France) Romain Dumas	5th
2015	(United Kingdom) Circuit of Ireland	ERC	Porsche 997 GT3	(United Kingdom) Robert Woodside	retired
2016	(Switzerland) Rallye International du Valais	TER	Porsche 997 GT3	(France) Marc Valliccioni	9th
2017	(Spain) Rally Islas Canarias	ERC	Abarth 124 R-GT	(Spain) Álvaro Muñiz	retired

== List of Group R-GT Cars ==
Brand	Chassis	Image	Debut
Abarth	124 R-GT		2016
Alpine	A110 Rally R-GT		2020
Lotus	Exige R-GT		2012
Porsche	996 GT3		2014
Porsche	997 GT3		2014
