= 2015 FIA R-GT Cup =

2015 FIA R-GT Cup
Previous:	none	Next:	2016

The 2015 FIA R-GT Cup was the first edition of the FIA rally cup for GT cars in Group R-GT. The cup was contested over 5 tarmac rounds from the World and European rally championships.

The championship was won by François Delecour in a Tuthill-prepared Porsche 997, winning two rallies – in Monte Carlo and Corsica – and finishing in second place in Ypres and Germany. With 86 points, Delecour scored exactly double the tally of second-placed driver Romain Dumas, who won in Germany and finished second to Delecour in Monte Carlo. Third place in the championship went to Marc Duez, who finished third on both events he contested – Monte Carlo and Ypres – while Patrick Snijers won his only event, in Ypres.

== Calendar ==
The calendar for the 2015 season featured five tarmac rallies: the three tarmac rounds from the WRC and two selected rounds from the ERC.

Round	Dates	Rally name	Series
1	22–25 January	(Monaco) 83ème Rallye Automobile Monte-Carlo	WRC
2	25–27 June	(Belgium) 51. Kenotek Ypres Rally	ERC
3	20–23 August	(Germany) 33. Rallye Deutschland	WRC
4	1–4 October	(France) 58. Tour de Corse	WRC
5	28–31 October	(Switzerland) 56. Rallye International du Valais	ERC

== Entries ==
Driver	Co-driver	Car	Rounds
(France) François Delecour	(France) Dominique Savignoni	Porsche 997 GT3	1–3
(France) François Delecour	(France) Sabrina De Castelli	Porsche 997 GT3	4–5
(France) Romain Dumas	(France) Denis Giraudet	Porsche 997 GT3 RS 4.0	1–4
(Belgium) Marc Duez	(Belgium) Steven Vyncke	Porsche 996 GT3	1
(Belgium) Marc Duez	(Belgium) Hendrik Béatse	Porsche 996 GT3	2
(Belgium) Patrick Snijers	(Belgium) Arne Bruneel	Porsche 997 GT3	2

== Results ==
Round	Rally name	Podium finishers					Statistics			
Round	Rally name	Pos.	Ovl.	Driver	Car	Time	Stages	Length	Starters	Finishers
1	(Monaco) 83ème Rallye Automobile de Monte-Carlo (22–25 January) — Results and report	1	23	(France) François Delecour	Porsche 997 GT3	4:10:01.6	(15)^{1} 14	(355.48 km)^{1} 335.55 km	3	3
1	(Monaco) 83ème Rallye Automobile de Monte-Carlo (22–25 January) — Results and report	2	26	(France) Romain Dumas	Porsche 997 GT3	4:12:53.8	(15)^{1} 14	(355.48 km)^{1} 335.55 km	3	3
1	(Monaco) 83ème Rallye Automobile de Monte-Carlo (22–25 January) — Results and report	3	40	(Belgium) Marc Duez	Porsche 996 GT3	4:26:17.6	(15)^{1} 14	(355.48 km)^{1} 335.55 km	3	3
2	(Belgium) 51. Kenotek Ypres Rally (26–27 June) — Results and report	1	13	(Belgium) Patrick Snijers	Porsche 997 GT3	2:31:57.4	17	253.38 km	4	3
2	(Belgium) 51. Kenotek Ypres Rally (26–27 June) — Results and report	2	19	(France) François Delecour	Porsche 997 GT3	2:33:20.7	17	253.38 km	4	3
2	(Belgium) 51. Kenotek Ypres Rally (26–27 June) — Results and report	3	20	(Belgium) Marc Duez	Porsche 996 GT3	2:33:44.1	17	253.38 km	4	3
3	(Germany) 33. ADAC Rallye Deutschland (21–23 August) — Results and report	1	26	(France) Romain Dumas	Porsche 997 GT3	4:13:29.0	21	374.43 km	2	2
3	(Germany) 33. ADAC Rallye Deutschland (21–23 August) — Results and report	2	53	(France) François Delecour	Porsche 997 GT3	5:01:13.5	21	374.43 km	2	2
4	(France) 58ème Tour de Corse (2–4 October) — Results and report	1	19	(France) François Delecour	Porsche 997 GT3	2:52:58.1	(9)^{2} 7	(332.73 km); 245.35 km	2	1
5	(Switzerland) 56. Rallye International du Valais (29–31 October) — Results and report			(France) François Delecour	Porsche 997 GT3	Retired	17	233.63 km	1	0

Notes

- ^1 – The Monte Carlo Rally was shortened, as overcrowding caused the ninth stage to be cancelled for safety reasons.
- ^2 – The Tour de Corse was shortened after flooding damaged roads on the Casamozza–Ponte Leccia stage. Both runs through the stage were cancelled.

== Standings ==
Points are awarded to the top ten classified finishers.

=== FIA R-GT Cup for Drivers ===
Position	1st	2nd	3rd	4th	5th	6th	7th	8th	9th	10th
Points	25	18	15	12	10	8	6	4	2	1

Pos.	Driver	MON (Monaco)	BEL (Belgium)	GER (Germany)	FRA (France)	SUI (Switzerland)	Points
1	(France) François Delecour	1	2	2	1	Ret	86
2	(France) Romain Dumas	2	Ret	1	Ret		43
3	(Belgium) Marc Duez	3	3				30
4	(Belgium) Patrick Snijers		1				25

Key
Colour	Result
Gold	Winner
Silver	2nd place
Bronze	3rd place
Green	Points finish
Blue	Non-points finish
Blue	Non-classified finish (NC)
Purple	Did not finish (Ret)
Black	Excluded (EX)
Black	Disqualified (DSQ)
White	Did not start (DNS)
White	Cancelled (C)
Blank	Withdrew entry from the event (WD)
