= 2018 European Rally Championship =

The 2018 European Rally Championship was the 66th season of the FIA European Rally Championship, the European continental championship series in rallying. The season was also the sixth following the merge between the European Rally Championship and the Intercontinental Rally Challenge. Kajetan Kajetanowicz was the reigning champion but he didn't return to defend his title.

For the second season, the European Junior Championship was split into two new categories. ERC Junior U27, which totals six events, is for drivers born on or after 1 January 1991 competing in R2 cars on Pirelli tyres. With the best four rounds counting, the winner will receive a career progression fund worth 100,000 euros to use in ERC Junior U28 in 2019.

ERC Junior U28 offers the next step on the rallying pyramid for drivers born on or after 1 January 1990. Again totalling six rounds with the best four scores counting, drivers use R5 cars with no restriction on tyre choice. The champion will get a drive on a European round of the 2019 FIA World Rally Championship as a P1 driver in a 2016-specification World Rally Car.

== Calendar ==
The calendar for the 2018 season features eight rallies like the previous season. Rajd Rzeszowski was replaced by Rally Poland.

Round	Dates	Rally name	Surface	
1	22–24 March	(Portugal) Rallye Açores	Gravel	ERC Junior Round 1
2	3–5 May	(Spain) Rally Islas Canarias	Tarmac	ERC Junior Round 2
3	1–3 June	(Greece) Acropolis Rally	Gravel	
4	15–17 June	Cyprus Rally	Gravel	
5	20–22 July	(Italy) Rally di Roma Capitale	Tarmac	ERC Junior Round 3
6	24–26 August	(Czech Republic) Barum Rally Zlín	Tarmac	ERC Junior Round 4
7	21–23 September	Rally Poland	Gravel	ERC Junior Round 5
8	12–14 October	(Latvia) Rally Liepāja	Gravel	ERC Junior Round 6

== Teams and drivers ==
=== ERC ===
Entries
Constructor	Car	Entrant	Class	Tyre	Drivers	Co-drivers	Rounds	
Škoda	Škoda Fabia R5	(Portugal) ARC Sport	R5	M	(Portugal) Bruno Magalhães	(Portugal) Hugo Magalhães	1–6	
Škoda	Škoda Fabia R5	(Portugal) ARC Sport	R5	M	(Portugal) Ricardo Moura	(Portugal) António Costa	1	
Škoda	Škoda Fabia R5	(Portugal) ARC Sport	R5	M	(Portugal) Aloísio Monteiro	(Portugal) André Couceiro	1, 3	
Škoda	Škoda Fabia R5	(Portugal) ARC Sport	R5	M	(Portugal) Aloísio Monteiro	(Portugal) Sancho Eiró	5–6	
Škoda	Škoda Fabia R5	(Portugal) ARC Sport	R5	M	(Portugal) Ricardo Teodósio	(Portugal) José Teixeira	1	
Škoda	Škoda Fabia R5	(Austria) BRR Baumschlager Rally & Racing Team	R5	P	(Germany) Albert von Thurn und Taxis	(Belgium) Bjorn Degandt	1–2, 4–6	
Škoda	Škoda Fabia R5	(Austria) BRR Baumschlager Rally & Racing Team	R5	P	(Germany) Albert von Thurn und Taxis	(Germany) Frank Christian	3	
Škoda	Škoda Fabia R5	(Germany) Škoda Auto Deutschland	R5	P	(Germany) Fabian Kreim	(Germany) Frank Christian	1–2, 5–8	U28
Škoda	Škoda Fabia R5	(Germany) Toksport World Rally Team	R5	P	(United Kingdom) Chris Ingram	(United Kingdom) Ross Whittock	1–2, 4–6	U28
Škoda	Škoda Fabia R5	(Germany) Toksport World Rally Team	R5	M	(United Kingdom) Chris Ingram	(United Kingdom) Ross Whittock	7–8	U28
Škoda	Škoda Fabia R5	(Germany) Toksport World Rally Team	R5	M	(Turkey) Orhan Avcioğlu	(Turkey) Burçin Korkmaz	7–8	
Škoda	Škoda Fabia R5	(Germany) Toksport World Rally Team	R5	P	(Turkey) Orhan Avcioğlu	(Turkey) Burçin Korkmaz	1–6	
Škoda	Škoda Fabia R5	(Germany) Toksport World Rally Team	R5	P	(Czech Republic) Antonín Tlusťák	(Czech Republic) Ivo Vybíral	4	
Škoda	Škoda Fabia R5	(Slovakia) Zaneti Motorsport	R5	P	(Czech Republic) Antonín Tlusťák	(Czech Republic) Ivo Vybíral	6	
Škoda	Škoda Fabia R5	Škoda Slovakia Motorsport	R5	M	(Slovakia) Martin Koči	(Czech Republic) Filip Schóvanek	1	U28
Škoda	Škoda Fabia R5	(Brazil) Palmeirinha Rally	R5	P	(Brazil) Paulo Nobre	(Brazil) Gabriel Morales	All	
Škoda	Škoda Fabia R5	(Hungary) TRT Krezus Rally Team	R5	P	(Poland) Hubert Ptaszek	(Poland) Maciek Sczcepaniak	1, 3–4	U28
Škoda	Škoda Fabia R5	(Hungary) TRT Krezus Rally Team	R5	M	(Poland) Hubert Ptaszek	(Poland) Maciek Sczcepaniak	2, 5	U28
Škoda	Škoda Fabia R5	(United Kingdom) CA1 Sport Ltd	R5	D	(Sweden) Fredrik Åhlin	(Sweden) Joakim Sjöberg	1, 8	U28
Škoda	Škoda Fabia R5	(United Kingdom) CA1 Sport Ltd	R5	M	(Sweden) Fredrik Åhlin	(Sweden) Joakim Sjöberg	5	U28
Škoda	Škoda Fabia R5	(United Kingdom) CA1 Sport Ltd	R5	M	(United Kingdom) Rhys Yates	(United Kingdom) Elliott Edmondson	1, 5	U28
Škoda	Škoda Fabia R5	(Czech Republic) Kresta Racing	R5	M	(United Kingdom) Rhys Yates	(United Kingdom) Elliott Edmondson	6, 8	U28
Škoda	Škoda Fabia R5	(Czech Republic) Kresta Racing	R5	P	(Poland) Szymon Ruta	(Poland) Kamil Heller	7	
Škoda	Škoda Fabia R5	(Hungary) Sysinfo Rallye Team	R5	P	(Hungary) Dávid Botka	(Hungary) Márk Mesterházi	1–2, 4, 6	
Škoda	Škoda Fabia R5	(Hungary) Mol Racing Team	R5	P	(Hungary) Norbert Herczig	(Hungary) Ramón Ferencz	1–4, 6–7	
Škoda	Škoda Fabia R5	(Portugal) Sports & You	R5	P	(Portugal) Diogo Salvi	(Portugal) Carlos Magalhães	1	
Škoda	Škoda Fabia R5	(Latvia) Sports Racing Technologies	R5	M	(Russia) Nikolay Gryazin	(Russia) Yaroslav Fedorov	2, 5	U28
Škoda	Škoda Fabia R5	(Latvia) Sports Racing Technologies	R5	P	(Russia) Nikolay Gryazin	(Russia) Yaroslav Fedorov	6–8	U28
Škoda	Škoda Fabia R5	(Slovakia) Rufa Sport	R5	M	(Czech Republic) Jaromír Tarabus	(Czech Republic) Daniel Trunkát	6	
Škoda	Škoda Fabia R5	(Slovakia) Rufa Sport	R5	M	(Poland) Grzegorz Grzyb	(Poland) Jakub Wróbel	2	
Škoda	Škoda Fabia R5	(Slovakia) Rufa Sport	R5	P	(Poland) Grzegorz Grzyb	(Poland) Jakub Wróbel	3, 5, 7	
Škoda	Škoda Fabia R5	Team Greece – OMAE	R5	P	(Greece) Yorgo Philippedes	(United Kingdom) Allan Harryman	3	
Škoda	Škoda Fabia R5	(Belgium) SXM Compétition	R5	M	(Greece) Jourdan Serderidis	(Belgium) Frédéric Miclotte	3	
Škoda	Škoda Fabia R5	(Cyprus) Galatariotis Rally Team	R5	M	(Cyprus) Simos Galatariotis	(Cyprus) Antonis Ioannou	3–5	
Škoda	Škoda Fabia R5	(Poland) Go+Cars	R5	P	(Ukraine) Yuriy Protasov	(Ukraine) Pavlo Cherepin	3	
Škoda	Škoda Fabia R5	(Czech Republic) Škoda Motorsport	R5	M	(Finland) Juuso Nordgren	(Finland) Tapio Suominen	3–5	
Škoda	Škoda Fabia R5	(Czech Republic) Škoda Motorsport	R5	M	(Czech Republic) Jan Kopecký	(Czech Republic) Pavel Dresler	6	
Škoda	Škoda Fabia R5	(Czech Republic) ACCR Czech Rally Team	R5	P	(Czech Republic) Filip Mareš	(Czech Republic) Jan Hloušek	6–8	U28
Škoda	Škoda Fabia R5	(Czech Republic) ACCR Czech Rally Team	R5	P	(Czech Republic) Vojtěch Štajf	(Czech Republic) Marcela Ehlová	4	
Škoda	Škoda Fabia R5	(Czech Republic) Racing 21–Klokočka Škoda Team	R5	P	(Czech Republic) Vojtěch Štajf	(Czech Republic) Marcela Ehlová	6	
Škoda	Škoda Fabia R5	(Italy) S.A. Motorsport Italia Srl	R5	D	(Italy) Umberto Scandola	(Italy) Guido D'Amore	5	
Škoda	Škoda Fabia R5	(Italy) Metior Sport	R5	P	(Italy) Giandomenico Basso	(Switzerland) Moira Lucca	5	
Škoda	Škoda Fabia R5	(Hungary) Juhász Média Kft	R5	M	(Hungary) László Német	(Hungary) János Szegõ	6	
Škoda	Škoda Fabia R5	(Czech Republic) Vančík Motorsport	R5	H	(Czech Republic) Miroslav Jakeš	(Czech Republic) Petr Machů	6	
Škoda	Škoda Fabia R5	(Czech Republic) Vančík Motorsport	R5	M	(Czech Republic) Martin Březík	(Czech Republic) Marek Omelka	6	
Škoda	Škoda Fabia R5	(Finland) Printsport	R5	M	(Poland) Łukasz Pieniążek	(Poland) Przemysław Mazur	7	U28
Škoda	Škoda Fabia R5	(Poland) Rally Technology	R5	P	(Poland) Łukasz Habaj	(Poland) Daniel Dymurski	7–8	
Škoda	Škoda Fabia R5	(Poland) Škoda Polska Motorsport	R5	P	(Poland) Miko Marczyk	(Poland) Szymon Gospodarczyk	7	U28
Škoda	Škoda Fabia R5	(Hungary) Érdi Rally Team	R5	P	(Hungary) Tibor Érdi	(Hungary) György Papp	8	
Ford	Ford Fiesta R5	(Russia) Russian Performance Motorsport	R5	P	(Russia) Alexey Lukyanuk	(Russia) Alexey Arnautov	1–7	
Ford	Ford Fiesta R5	(Poland) Rally Technology	R5	P	(Poland) Łukasz Habaj	(Poland) Daniel Dymurski	1, 3	
Ford	Ford Fiesta R5	(Poland) Rally Technology	R5	M	(Poland) Łukasz Habaj	(Poland) Daniel Dymurski	2, 5–6	
Ford	Ford Fiesta R5	(Poland) Rally Technology	R5	M	(Poland) Dariusz Poloński	(Poland) Łukasz Sitek	7	
Ford	Ford Fiesta R5	(United Kingdom) CA1 Sport Ltd	R5	P	(Norway) Frank Tore Larsen	(Norway) Torstein Eriksen	1	U28
Ford	Ford Fiesta R5	(Italy) G. Car Sport Racing	R5	P	(Italy) Tamara Molinaro	(Belgium) Martijn Wydaeghe	1	U28
Ford	Ford Fiesta R5	(Portugal) Team Além Mar	R5	P	(Portugal) Luís Rego	(Portugal) Jorge Henriques	1	U28
Ford	Ford Fiesta R5	(Poland) Tiger Energy Drink Rally Team	R5	P	(Poland) Tomasz Kasperczyk	(Poland) Damian Syty	1, 7	U28
Ford	Ford Fiesta R5	(Austria) ZM Racing	R5	P	(Austria) Hermann Neubauer	(Austria) Bernhard Ettel	1–2, 6	
Ford	Ford Fiesta R5	(Poland) C-Rally	R5	P	(Poland) Jarosław Kołtun	(Poland) Ireneusz Pleskot	1	
Ford	Ford Fiesta R5	(Poland) NB Quality Rally Team	R5	P	(Poland) Jarosław Kołtun	(Poland) Ireneusz Pleskot	7	
Ford	Ford Fiesta R5	(Portugal) ARC Sport	R5	M	(Portugal) Joaquim Alves	(Portugal) Sancho Eiró	1	
Ford	Ford Fiesta R5	(Portugal) ARC Sport	R5	M	(Portugal) Pedro Almeida	(Portugal) Nuno Almeida	1	
Ford	Ford Fiesta R5	(Spain) Auto Laca Competición	R5	M	(Spain) Luis Monzón	(Spain) José Carlos Déniz	2	
Ford	Ford Fiesta R5	(United Kingdom) Autotek Motorsport	R5	P	(Norway) Eyvind Brynildsen	(Austria) Ilka Minor	8	
Ford	Ford Fiesta R5	(United Kingdom) Autotek Motorsport	R5	M	(Norway) Eyvind Brynildsen	(Norway) Torstein Eriksen	2, 6	
Ford	Ford Fiesta R5	(United Kingdom) Autotek Motorsport	R5	M	(Norway) Eyvind Brynildsen	(Norway) Veronica Engan	3	
Ford	Ford Fiesta R5	(United Kingdom) Autotek Motorsport	R5	M	(Qatar) Nasser Al-Attiyah	(France) Mathieu Baumel	4	
Ford	Ford Fiesta R5	(Czech Republic) ACCR Czech Rally Team	R5	M	(Czech Republic) Jan Černý	(Czech Republic) Petr Černohorský	2, 5–6	U28
Ford	Ford Fiesta R5	(Italy) Orange 1 Racing	R5	M	(Italy) Simone Campedelli	(Switzerland) Tania Canton	5	
Ford	Ford Fiesta R5	(Czech Republic) EuroOil Invelt Team	R5	P	(Czech Republic) Václav Pech	(Czech Republic) Petr Uhel	6	
Ford	Ford Fiesta R5	(Czech Republic) C.G.T. CZ Team	R5	M	(Czech Republic) Roman Odložilík	(Czech Republic) Martin Tureček	6	
Ford	Ford Fiesta R5	(Czech Republic) Kowax Racing	R5	P	(Czech Republic) Martin Vlček	(Czech Republic) Jindřiška Žáková	6	
Ford	Ford Fiesta R5	(Czech Republic) Kimi Sport	R5	P	(Czech Republic) Tomáš Růžička	(Czech Republic) Jaroslav Novák	6	
Ford	Ford Fiesta R5	(Austria) Drift Company Rally Team	R5	P	(Austria) Niki Mayr-Melnhof	(Austria) Leopold Welsersheimb	8	
Ford	Ford Fiesta R5	(Latvia) Neikšāns Rallysport	R5	P	(Latvia) Jānis Berķis	(Latvia) Edgars Čeporjus	8	
Peugeot	Peugeot 208 T16 R5	(Germany) Peugeot Deutschland	R5	M	(Germany) Marijan Griebel	(Germany) Stefan Kopczyk	1	
Peugeot	Peugeot 208 T16 R5	(France) Peugeot Rally Academy	R5	M	(France) Laurent Pellier	(France) Geoffrey Combe	1–2, 5–8	U28
Peugeot	Peugeot 208 T16 R5	(Italy) Delta Rally	R5	P	(Italy) Giacomo Costenaro	(Italy) Justin Bardini	1 WD	
Peugeot	Peugeot 208 T16 R5	(Italy) F.P.F. Sport Srl	R5	P	(Italy) Paolo Andreucci	(Italy) David Castiglioni	5	
Peugeot	Peugeot 208 T16 R5	(Italy) F.P.F. Sport Srl	R5	P	(Italy) Marco Pollara	(Italy) Giuseppe Princiotto	5	
Hyundai	Hyundai i20 R5	Team Hyundai Portugal	R5	P	(Portugal) Carlos Vieira	(Portugal) Jorge Carvalho	1	
Hyundai	Hyundai i20 R5	(Italy) BRC Racing Team	R5	M	(France) Pierre-Louis Loubet	(France) Vincent Landais	1–2	U28
Hyundai	Hyundai i20 R5	(Italy) BRC Racing Team	R5	M	(Finland) Jari Huttunen	(Finland) Antti Linnaketo	7	
Hyundai	Hyundai i20 R5	(Portugal) Racing 4 You	R5	D	(Portugal) Manuel Castro	(Portugal) Mário Castro	1	
Hyundai	Hyundai i20 R5	(Spain) Hyundai Motor España	R5	P	(Spain) Iván Ares	(Spain) José Pintor	2	
Hyundai	Hyundai i20 R5	(Spain) Hyundai Motor España	R5	P	(Spain) Surhayén Pernía	(Spain) Rogelio Peñate	2	
Hyundai	Hyundai i20 R5	(Spain) Hyundai Motor España	R5	M	(Spain) José Antonio Suárez	(Spain) Cándido Carrera	2	U28
Hyundai	Hyundai i20 R5	(Poland) MSZ Racing	R5	P	(Poland) Aleks Zawada	(Poland) Grzegorz Dachowski	2	U28
Hyundai	Hyundai i20 R5	(Cyprus) Yiangou Motorsport Ltd	R5	P	(Cyprus) Panayiotis Yiangou	(Cyprus) Constantinos Constantinou	4	
Hyundai	Hyundai i20 R5	(Germany) Hyundai Motorsport	R5	M	(Spain) Dani Sordo	(Spain) Carlos del Barrio	6	
Citroën	Citroën DS3 R5	(Portugal) Citroën Vodafone Team	R5	P	(Portugal) José Pedro Fontes	(Portugal) Paulo Babo	1	
Citroën	Citroën DS3 R5	(Portugal) Raly/Auto Açoreana Racing	R5	P	(Portugal) Bernardo Sousa	(Portugal) Valter Cardoso	1	
Citroën	Citroën DS3 R5	(Cyprus) Tsouloftas Rally Team	R5	M	(Cyprus) Alex Tsouloftas	(Cyprus) Antonis Chrysostomou	3–4	
Citroën	Citroën DS3 R5	(Cyprus) Psaltis Auto Parts	R5	M	(Cyprus) Antonis Chilimindris	(Cyprus) Stelios Elia	4	
Fiat	Fiat Abarth 124 RGT	(France) Milano Racing	RGT	M	(France) Raphaël Astier	(France) Frédéric Vauclare	5–6	
Fiat	Fiat Abarth 124 RGT	(Italy) Bernini Rally	RGT	M	(Italy) Andrea Nucita	(Italy) Marco Vozzo	5–6	
Fiat	Fiat Abarth 124 RGT	(Italy) Bernini Rally	RGT	M	(Italy) Andrea Modanesi	(Italy) Roberto Mometti	5–6	
Fiat	Fiat Abarth 124 RGT	(Italy) Bernini Rally	RGT	M	(Romania) Simone Tempestini	(Romania) Sergiu Itu	6–8	
Fiat	Fiat Abarth 124 RGT	(Czech Republic) Agrotec Autoklub v AČR	RGT	M	(Czech Republic) Martin Rada	(Czech Republic) Jaroslav Jugas	6	
Porsche	Porsche 997 GT3	(Czech Republic) Rally Team Pavelini	RGT	M	(Czech Republic) Petr Nešetřil	(Czech Republic) Jiří Černoch	6	

=== ERC-2 ===
Entries
Constructor	Car	Entrant	Class	Tyre	Drivers	Co-drivers	Rounds
Mitsubishi	Mitsubishi Lancer Evo X	(Portugal) ACB Racing	N	P	(Hungary) Tibor Érdi	(Hungary) György Papp	1
Mitsubishi	Mitsubishi Lancer Evo X	(Hungary) Érdi Rally Team	N	P	(Hungary) Tibor Érdi	(Hungary) György Papp	2–3, 5–6
Mitsubishi	Mitsubishi Lancer Evo X	(Russia) Russian Performance Motorsport	N	P	(Russia) Sergey Remennik	(Russia) Mark Rozin	1–3, 5, 8
Mitsubishi	Mitsubishi Lancer Evo X	(Spain) Calm Competició	N	P	(Portugal) Luís Pimentel	(Portugal) Nuno Moura	1
Mitsubishi	Mitsubishi Lancer Evo X	(Spain) RMC Motorsport	N	D	(Argentina) Juan Carlos Alonso	(Argentina) Juan Pablo Monasterolo	1
Mitsubishi	Mitsubishi Lancer Evo X	(Lithuania) Pro Racing	N	D	(Argentina) Juan Carlos Alonso	(Argentina) Juan Pablo Monasterolo	3–4
Mitsubishi	Mitsubishi Lancer Evo X	(Lithuania) Pro Racing	N	M	(Argentina) Juan Carlos Alonso	(Argentina) Juan Pablo Monasterolo	2
Mitsubishi	Mitsubishi Lancer Evo X	(Lithuania) Pro Racing	N	P	(Argentina) Juan Carlos Alonso	(Argentina) José Díaz	5
Mitsubishi	Mitsubishi Lancer Evo X	(Greece) Halkias Racing	N	P	(Italy) Zelindo Melegari	(Italy) Andrea Cecchi	3–4
Mitsubishi	Mitsubishi Lancer Evo X	(Cyprus) Q8 Oils Rally Team	N	P	(Cyprus) Petros Panteli	(Cyprus) Kypros Christodoulou	3–4
Mitsubishi	Mitsubishi Lancer Evo X	(Cyprus) Autotelio Rally Team	N	P	(Cyprus) Michalis Posedias	(Cyprus) Kyriacos Damianou	4
Mitsubishi	Mitsubishi Lancer Evo X	(Hungary) Juhász Média Kft	N	P	(Hungary) Csaba Juhász	(Hungary) Zsolt Juhász	5–6
Mitsubishi	Mitsubishi Lancer Evo X	(Latvia) Neikšāns Rallysport	N	M	(Latvia) Reinis Nitišs	(Latvia) Andris Mālnieks	8
Mitsubishi	Mitsubishi Lancer Evo X	(Estonia) ALM Motorsport	N	P	(Spain) Gustavo Sosa	(Spain) Rogelio Peñate	8
Mitsubishi	Mitsubishi Lancer Evo IX	(Cyprus) Psaltis Auto Parts	N	Y	(Cyprus) Panikos Polykarpou	(Cyprus) Costantinos Shialos	4
Mitsubishi	Mitsubishi Lancer Evo IX	(Cyprus) Psaltis Auto Parts	N	P	(Cyprus) Andreas Psaltis	(Cyprus) Andreas Chrysostomou	4
Mitsubishi	Mitsubishi Lancer Evo IX	(Lithuania) KSK Juta	N	P	(Lithuania) Vytautas Švedas	(Lithuania) Žilvinas Sakalauskas	8
Mitsubishi	Mitsubishi Lancer Evo IX	(Estonia) ALM Motorsport	N	P	(Estonia) Allan Popov	(Russia) Alexey Krylov	8
Subaru	Subaru Impreza WRX STI	(San Marino) WAR Racing	N	P	(Italy) Zelindo Melegari	(Italy) Andrea Cecchi	1–2
Subaru	Subaru Impreza WRX STI	(Germany) Toksport World Rally Team	N	P	(Turkey) Menderes Okur	(Turkey) Ufuk Uluocak	1, 3
Subaru	Subaru Impreza WRX STI	(Germany) Toksport World Rally Team	N	P	(Lebanon) Gilbert Bannout	(France) Maxime Vilmot	2
Subaru	Subaru Impreza WRX STI	(Greece) Drymoussis Rally Team	N	M	(Greece) Vassilios Drymoussis	(Greece) Panayiotis Drymoussis	3
Subaru	Subaru Impreza WRX STI	Subaru Poland Rally Team	N	P	(Poland) Marcin Słobodzian	(Poland) Grzegorz Dachowski	7

=== ERC-3 ===
Entries
Constructor	Car	Entrant	Class	Tyre	Drivers	Co-drivers	Rounds	
Peugeot	Peugeot 208 R2	(Czech Republic) ACCR Czech Rally Team	R2	P	(Czech Republic) Dominik Brož	(Czech Republic) Petr Těšínský	1–2, 5–8	U27
Peugeot	Peugeot 208 R2	(France) Saintéloc Junior Team	R2	P	(Austria) Simon Wagner	(Austria) Gerald Winter	1–2, 5–6	U27
Peugeot	Peugeot 208 R2	(France) Saintéloc Junior Team	R2	P	(United Kingdom) Catie Munnings	(Germany) Anne Stein	1–2, 5, 7–8	U27
Peugeot	Peugeot 208 R2	(France) Saintéloc Junior Team	R2	P	(United Kingdom) Catie Munnings	(Spain) Alba Sánchez	6	U27
Peugeot	Peugeot 208 R2	(France) Saintéloc Junior Team	R2	M	(United Kingdom) Catie Munnings	(Spain) Alba Sánchez	4	U27
Peugeot	Peugeot 208 R2	(France) Saintéloc Junior Team	R2	P	(Finland) Miika Hokkanen	(Finland) Jukka Pasenius	2	U27
Peugeot	Peugeot 208 R2	(France) Saintéloc Junior Team	R2	P	(Finland) Miika Hokkanen	(Finland) Reeta Hämäläinen	5–8	U27
Peugeot	Peugeot 208 R2	(France) Saintéloc Junior Team	R2	M	(France) Laurent Pellier	(France) Geoffrey Combe	4	
Peugeot	Peugeot 208 R2	(Hungary) TRT Junior Rally Team	R2	P	(Italy) Mattia Vita	(Italy) Pietro Ometto	5–8	U27
Peugeot	Peugeot 208 R2	(Slovenia) Oktan Sport	R2	P	(Italy) Mattia Vita	(Italy) Pietro Ometto	1–2	U27
Peugeot	Peugeot 208 R2	(Slovenia) Oktan Sport	R2	P	(Finland) Miika Hokkanen	(Finland) Jukka Pasenius	1	U27
Peugeot	Peugeot 208 R2	Team Rallye Spain	R2	P	(Spain) Efrén Llarena	(Spain) Sara Fernández	1–2, 5–8	U27
Peugeot	Peugeot 208 R2	(Portugal) Renato Pita Motorsport	R2	P	(Denmark) Simon Vallentin	(Denmark) Jeannette Kvick	1	U27
Peugeot	Peugeot 208 R2	(Portugal) PT Racing	R2	P	(Portugal) Pedro Antunes	(Portugal) Paulo Lopes	1	U27
Peugeot	Peugeot 208 R2	(Portugal) PT Racing	R2	P	(Portugal) Ruben Rodrigues	(Portugal) Estevão Rodrigues	1	
Peugeot	Peugeot 208 R2	(Spain) Race Seven	R2	P	(Portugal) Diogo Gago	(Portugal) Miguel Ramalho	1–2, 5	U27
Peugeot	Peugeot 208 R2	(Spain) Escudería Coruña	R2	P	(Spain) Roberto Blach	(Spain) José Murado	2	U27
Peugeot	Peugeot 208 R2	(Russia) TB Racing	R2	P	(Russia) Artur Muradian	(Russia) Pavel Chelebaev	3	
Peugeot	Peugeot 208 R2	(Sweden) JR Motorsport	R2	P	(Sweden) Sebastian Johansson	(Sweden) Jesper Elfver	5, 7	U27
Peugeot	Peugeot 208 R2	(Hungary) Klaus Motorsport	R2	P	(Hungary) Kristóf Klausz	(Hungary) Botond Csányi	6, 8	U27
Peugeot	Peugeot 208 R2	(Czech Republic) Sparrow Racing Team	R2	P	(Austria) Julian Wagner	(Germany) Anne Stein	6	U27
Peugeot	Peugeot 208 R2	(Czech Republic) MRS Racing Team	R2	P	(Czech Republic) Matěj Kamenec	(Czech Republic) Adam Jurka	6	
Peugeot	Peugeot 208 R2	(Hungary) M-Sport Racing Kft	R2	P	(Hungary) Martin László	(Hungary) Gábor Zsíros	6	
Peugeot	Peugeot 208 R2	(Hungary) Credobus LPWM Sport Kft	R2	P	(Hungary) Miklós Csomós	(Hungary) Attila Nagy	6	
Peugeot	Peugeot 208 R2	(Poland) Rally Technology	R2	P	(Poland) Kacper Wróblewski	(Poland) Jack Spentany	7	U27
Peugeot	Peugeot 208 R2	(Estonia) ALM Motorsport	R2	P	(Russia) Alexander Kudryavtsev	(Ukraine) Volodymyr Korsia	7–8	
Peugeot	Peugeot 208 R2	(Estonia) ALM Motorsport	R2	P	(Estonia) Georg Linnamäe	(Estonia) Urmas Roosimaa	7–8	
Peugeot	Peugeot 208 R2	(Spain) GC Motorsport	R2	M	(Spain) Emma Falcón	(Spain) Eduardo González	8	
Peugeot	Peugeot 208 R2	(Latvia) Sports Racing Technologies	R2	P	(Norway) Oliver Solberg	(Norway) Veronica Engan	8	
Peugeot	Peugeot 208 R2	(Lithuania) Sportinio Vairavimo Centras	R2	P	(Lithuania) Vladas Jurkevičius	(Lithuania) Edvinas Bieliauskas	8	
Opel	Opel Adam R2	(Germany) ADAC Opel Rallye Junior Team	R2	P	(Latvia) Mārtiņ Sesks	(Latvia) Renars Francis	1–2, 5–8	U27
Opel	Opel Adam R2	(Germany) ADAC Opel Rallye Junior Team	R2	P	(Sweden) Tom Kristensson	(Sweden) Henrik Appelskog	1–2, 5–8	U27
Opel	Opel Adam R2	(Austria) Stengg Motorsport	R2	P	(Austria) Roland Stengg	(Austria) Claudia Dorfbauer	2, 8	U27
Opel	Opel Adam R2	(Austria) Stengg Motorsport	R2	P	(Austria) Roland Stengg	(Germany) Tobias Braun	5	U27
Opel	Opel Adam R2	(Austria) Stengg Motorsport	R2	P	(Austria) Roland Stengg	(Austria) Jürgen Heigl	6	U27
Opel	Opel Adam R2	(Norway) Sindre Furuseth Rally	R2	P	(Norway) Sindre Furuseth	(Sweden) Jim Hjerpe	5–8	U27
Opel	Opel Adam R2	(Belgium) EBRT	R2	P	(Luxembourg) Grégoire Munster	(Belgium) Louis Louka	6	U27
Renault	Renault Clio RS R3T	(Portugal) CRN Competition	R3	M	(Portugal) Gil Antunes	(Portugal) Diogo Correia	1	
Renault	Renault Clio RS R3T	(France) Fred Anne Compétition	R3	M	(France) Florian Bernardi	(France) Victor Bellotto	2, 5	
Renault	Renault Clio R3	(Portugal) ARC Sport	R3	M	(Portugal) Miguel Correia	(Portugal) Pedro Alves	1	
Renault	Renault Clio R3	(Russia) TB Racing	R3	P	(Russia) Artur Muradian	(Russia) Maxim Gordiushkin	4	
Citroën	Citroën DS3 R3T	(Portugal) ARC Sport	R3	M	(Spain) Emma Falcón	(Spain) Eduardo González	1–6	
Citroën	Citroën DS3 R3T	(Italy) GMA Racing	R3	P	(Greece) Chrysostomos Karellis	(Greece) Elias Panayiotounis	3	
Citroën	Citroën DS3 R3T	(Cyprus) Mannouris Rally Team	R3	P	(Cyprus) Christos Mannouris	(Cyprus) Andreas Mannouris	4	
Ford	Ford Fiesta R2	(Latvia) Baltic Motorsport Promotion	R2	P	(India) Amittrajit Ghosh	(India) Ashwin Naik	3	
Ford	Ford Fiesta R2	(Cyprus) Q8 Oils Rally Team	R2	P	(Cyprus) Costantinos Televantos	(Cyprus) Takis Stavrou	4	
Suzuki	Suzuki Swift Sport	(Hungary) Juhász Média Kft	R1	P	(Hungary) Norbert Bereczki	(Hungary) Tamás Géczy	4	

=== Ladies Trophy ===
Entries
Constructor	Car	Entrant	Class	Tyre	Drivers	Co-drivers	Rounds
Ford	Ford Fiesta R5	(Italy) G. Car Sport Racing	R5	P	(Italy) Tamara Molinaro	(Belgium) Martijn Wydaeghe	1
Peugeot	Peugeot 208 R2	(France) Saintéloc Junior Team	R2	P	(United Kingdom) Catie Munnings	(Germany) Anne Stein	1–2, 5, 7–8
Peugeot	Peugeot 208 R2	(France) Saintéloc Junior Team	R2	P	(United Kingdom) Catie Munnings	(Spain) Alba Sánchez	6
Peugeot	Peugeot 208 R2	(France) Saintéloc Junior Team	R2	M	(United Kingdom) Catie Munnings	(Spain) Alba Sánchez	4
Peugeot	Peugeot 208 R2	(Spain) GC Motorsport	R2	M	(Spain) Emma Falcón	(Spain) Eduardo González	8
Citroën	Citroën DS3 R3T	(Portugal) ARC Sport	R3	M	(Spain) Emma Falcón	(Spain) Eduardo González	1–6

== Results ==
Round	Rally name	Podium finishers			
Round	Rally name	Rank	Driver	Car	Time
1	(Portugal) Açores Airlines Rally (22–24 March) — Results	1	(Russia) Alexey Lukyanuk	Ford Fiesta R5	02:33:51.7
1	(Portugal) Açores Airlines Rally (22–24 March) — Results	2	(Portugal) Ricardo Moura	Škoda Fabia R5	02:34:08.1
1	(Portugal) Açores Airlines Rally (22–24 March) — Results	3	(Portugal) Bruno Magalhães	Škoda Fabia R5	02:34:17.4
2	(Spain) Rally Islas Canarias (3–5 May) — Results	1	(Russia) Alexey Lukyanuk	Ford Fiesta R5	02:06:23.6
2	(Spain) Rally Islas Canarias (3–5 May) — Results	2	(Russia) Nikolay Gryazin	Škoda Fabia R5	02:07:15.0
2	(Spain) Rally Islas Canarias (3–5 May) — Results	3	(Germany) Fabian Kreim	Škoda Fabia R5	02:07:53.1
3	(Greece) EKO Acropolis Rally (1–3 June) — Results	1	(Portugal) Bruno Magalhães	Škoda Fabia R5	03:02:09.4
3	(Greece) EKO Acropolis Rally (1–3 June) — Results	2	(Hungary) Norbert Herczig	Škoda Fabia R5	03:02:38.5
3	(Greece) EKO Acropolis Rally (1–3 June) — Results	3	(Poland) Hubert Ptaszek	Škoda Fabia R5	03:03:46.6
4	Cyprus Rally (15–17 June) — Results	1	(Cyprus) Simos Galatariotis	Škoda Fabia R5	01:55:40.2
4	Cyprus Rally (15–17 June) — Results	2	(Portugal) Bruno Magalhães	Škoda Fabia R5	01:55:40.8
4	Cyprus Rally (15–17 June) — Results	3	(Hungary) Norbert Herczig	Škoda Fabia R5	01:57:01.6
5	(Italy) Rally di Roma Capitale (19–22 July) — Results	1	(Russia) Alexey Lukyanuk	Ford Fiesta R5	01:48:03.5
5	(Italy) Rally di Roma Capitale (19–22 July) — Results	2	(Italy) Giandomenico Basso	Škoda Fabia R5	01:48:11.0
5	(Italy) Rally di Roma Capitale (19–22 July) — Results	3	(Poland) Grzegorz Grzyb	Škoda Fabia R5	01:49:07.7
6	(Czech Republic) Barum Rally Zlín (24–26 August) — Results	1	(Czech Republic) Jan Kopecký	Škoda Fabia R5	02:07:47.2
6	(Czech Republic) Barum Rally Zlín (24–26 August) — Results	2	(Russia) Alexey Lukyanuk	Ford Fiesta R5	02:07:54.7
6	(Czech Republic) Barum Rally Zlín (24–26 August) — Results	3	(Spain) Dani Sordo	Hyundai i20 R5	02:08:40.8
7	Rally Poland (21–23 September) — Results	1	(Russia) Nikolay Gryazin	Škoda Fabia R5	01:53:43.5
7	Rally Poland (21–23 September) — Results	2	(Finland) Jari Huttunen	Hyundai i20 R5	01:53:51.8
7	Rally Poland (21–23 September) — Results	3	(United Kingdom) Chris Ingram	Škoda Fabia R5	01:56:09.4
8	(Latvia) Rally Liepāja (12–14 October) — Results	1	(Russia) Nikolay Gryazin	Škoda Fabia R5	01:40:14.5
8	(Latvia) Rally Liepāja (12–14 October) — Results	2	(United Kingdom) Chris Ingram	Škoda Fabia R5	01:40:57.8
8	(Latvia) Rally Liepāja (12–14 October) — Results	3	(Sweden) Fredrik Åhlin	Škoda Fabia R5	01:41:03.3

== Championship standings ==
=== Points Systems ===
==== ERC, ERC-2, ERC-3, ERC Junior U28, ERC Junior U27, Teams and Ladies Trophy ====
- For the Teams' championship all the results will be retained by each team.
- For both the Drivers' championships of the ERC, ERC-2 and ERC-3, only the best six results will be retained by each driver.
- For the ERC Junior U28, the ERC Junior U27 and the Ladies Trophy, only the best four results will be retained by each driver.
- Points for final position are awarded as in following table:

Position	1st	2nd	3rd	4th	5th	6th	7th	8th	9th	10th
Points	25	18	15	12	10	8	6	4	2	1

- Bonus points awarded for position in each Leg

Position	1st	2nd	3rd	4th	5th	6th	7th
Points	7	6	5	4	3	2	1

=== Drivers' Championships ===
==== ERC ====
Pos	Driver	AZO (Portugal)	CAN (Spain)	ACR (Greece)	CYP (Cyprus)	RMC (Italy)	ZLÍ (Czech Republic)	POL (Poland)	LIE (Latvia)	Points	Best 6
1	(Russia) Alexey Lukyanuk	1^{25+12}	1^{25+14}	19^{0+7}	Ret	1^{25+12}	2^{18+12}	Ret		150	150
2	(Russia) Nikolay Gryazin		2^{18+12}			20^{0+4}	5^{10+5}	1^{25+13}	1^{25+14}	126	126
3	(Portugal) Bruno Magalhães	3^{15+12}	7^{6+2}	1^{25+9}	2^{18+11}	5^{10+3}	9^{2}			113	113
4	(Germany) Fabian Kreim	12^{0+1}	3^{15+10}			4^{12+5}	6^{8+4}	4^{12+8}	4^{12+10}	97	97
5	(United Kingdom) Chris Ingram	4^{12+6}	Ret			6^{8+3}	8^{4+1}	3^{15+10}	2^{18+10}	87	87
6	(Hungary) Norbert Herczig	6^{8+4}	11	2^{18+10}	3^{15+7}		Ret	10^{1}		63	63
7	(Poland) Grzegorz Grzyb		6^{8+3}	6^{8+2}		3^{15+6}		7^{6+3}		51	51
8	(Cyprus) Simos Galatariotis			5^{10+4}	1^{25+11}	14				50	50
9	(Sweden) Fredrik Åhlin	5^{10+2}				8^{4}			3^{15+10}	41	41
10	(Czech Republic) Jan Kopecký						1^{25+13}			38	38
11	(Poland) Łukasz Habaj	7^{6}	10^{1}	13		26		6^{8+4}	5^{10+5}	34	34
12	(Finland) Jari Huttunen							2^{18+13}		31	31
13	(Portugal) Ricardo Moura	2^{18+12}								30	30
14	(Italy) Giandomenico Basso					2^{18+12}				30	30
15	(Norway) Eyvind Brynildsen		9^{2+2}	4^{12+8}					Ret^{0+2}	26	26
16	(Spain) Dani Sordo						3^{15+9}			24	24
17	(Turkey) Orhan Avcioglu	Ret	15	8^{4+1}	5^{10+4}	10^{1}	11	11	8^{4}	24	24
18	(Poland) Hubert Ptaszek	35	14	3^{15+8}	22			Ret		23	23
19	(Czech Republic) Miroslav Jakeš						4^{12+9}			21	21
20	(Finland) Juuso Nordgren			18^{0+6}	Ret^{0+7}	7^{6+1}				20	20
21	(Czech Republic) Filip Mareš						Ret^{0+2}	8^{4}	6^{8+4}	18	18
22	(Spain) José Antonio Suárez		4^{12+5}							17	17
23	(Qatar) Nasser Al-Attiyah				4^{12+4}					16	16
24	(France) Laurent Pellier	31	5^{10+5}		12	Ret	10^{1}	22	Ret	16	16
25	(Poland) Mikołaj Marczyk							5^{10+5}		15	15
26	(United Kingdom) Rhys Yates	8^{4}				13	Ret		7^{6+1}	11	11
27	(Czech Republic) Vojtěch Štajf				6^{8+2}		Ret			10	10
28	(Hungary) Dávid Botka	Ret	Ret		7^{6+2}		14			8	8
29	(Czech Republic) Jaromír Tarabus						7^{6+2}			8	8
30	(Cyprus) Alexandros Tsouloftas			Ret	10^{1+7}					8	8
31	(Greece) Jourdan Serderidis			7^{6+1}						7	7
32	(Italy) Simone Campedelli					22^{0+7}				7	7
33	(France) Pierre-Louis Loubet	34^{0+3}	Ret^{0+3}							6	6
34	(Germany) Albert von Thurn und Taxis	Ret	13	14	8^{4+1}	11	Ret			5	5
35	(Spain) Iván Ares		8^{4}							4	4
36	(Slovakia) Martin Koči	Ret^{0+3}								3	3
37	(Italy) Paolo Andreucci					Ret^{0+3}				3	3
38	(Sweden) Tom Kristensson	Ret	21			18	19	13	9^{2}	2	2
39	(Brazil) Paulo Nobre	18	Ret	9^{2}	14	16	24	17	Ret	2	2
40	(Cyprus) Petros Panteli			16	9^{2}					2	2
41	(Poland) Tomasz Kasperczyk	29						9^{2}		2	2
42	(Portugal) Ricardo Teodósio	9^{2}								2	2
43	(Italy) Marco Pollara					9^{2}				2	2
44	(Latvia) Mārtiņš Sesks	17	19			15	15	Ret	10^{1}	1	1
45	(Hungary) Tibor Érdi	Ret	23	10^{1}		17	20			1	1
46	(Portugal) José Pedro Fontes	10^{1}								1	1
47	(Portugal) Bernardo Sousa	Ret^{0+1}								1	1

Key
Colour	Result
Gold	Winner
Silver	2nd place
Bronze	3rd place
Green	Points finish
Blue	Non-points finish
Blue	Non-classified finish (NC)
Purple	Did not finish (Ret)
Black	Excluded (EX)
Black	Disqualified (DSQ)
White	Did not start (DNS)
White	Cancelled (C)
Blank	Withdrew entry from the event (WD)

==== ERC-2 ====
Pos	Driver	AZO (Portugal)	CAN (Spain)	ACR (Greece)	CYP (Cyprus)	RMC (Italy)	ZLÍ (Czech Republic)	POL (Poland)	LIE (Latvia)	Points	Best 6
1	(Hungary) Tibor Érdi	Ret^{0+2}	1^{25+13}	1^{25+14}		1^{25+14}	1^{25+14}			157	157
2	(Russia) Sergey Remennik	2^{18+13}	2^{18+11}	2^{18+11}		3^{15+10}			1^{25+14}	153	153
3	(Argentina) Juan Carlos Alonso	1^{25+13}	Ret^{0+6}	Ret^{0+4}	3^{15+9}	Ret				72	72
4	(Cyprus) Petros Panteli			4^{12+10}	1^{25+13}					60	60
5	(Italy) Zelindo Melegari	Ret^{0+3}	Ret^{0+5}	3^{15+8}	4^{12+7}					50	50
6	(Poland) Marcin Słobodzian							1^{25+14}		39	39
7	(Cyprus) Michalis Posedias				2^{18+12}					30	30
8	(Hungary) Csaba Juhász					2^{18+12}				30	30
9	(Portugal) Luís Pimentel	3^{15+9}								24	24
10	(Lebanon) Gilbert Bannout		3^{15+8}							23	23
11	(Turkey) Menderes Okur	4^{12+9}								21	21
12	(Cyprus) Panikos Polykarpou				5^{10+9}					19	19
13	(Cyprus) Andreas Psaltis				Ret^{0+2}					2	2

==== ERC-3 ====
Pos	Driver	AZO (Portugal)	CAN (Spain)	ACR (Greece)	CYP (Cyprus)	RMC (Italy)	ZLÍ (Czech Republic)	POL (Poland)	LIE (Latvia)	Points	Best 6
1	(Latvia) Mārtiņš Sesks	3^{15+11}	3^{15+11}			1^{25+12}	1^{25+13}	Ret	2^{18+12}	157	157
2	(Sweden) Tom Kristensson	Ret	5^{10+5}			2^{18+11}	3^{15+9}	1^{25+13}	1^{25+14}	145	145
3	(Spain) Efrén Llarena	2^{18+10}	Ret^{0+4}			3^{15+11}	7^{6+5}	2^{18+13}		100	100
4	(United Kingdom) Catie Munnings	7^{6+1}	11		5^{10+7}	5^{10+2}	6^{8}	5^{10+6}	5^{10+4}	74	74
5	(Spain) Emma Falcón		10^{1}	2^{18+11}	4^{12+7}	6^{8+2}	Ret		7^{6+2}	67	67
6	(Italy) Mattia Vita	8^{4+1}	Ret			4^{12+6}	4^{12+4}	4^{12+8}	Ret^{0+3}	62	62
7	(Finland) Miika Hokkanen		7^{6+1}			Ret^{0+2}	Ret	3^{15+10}	3^{15+10}	59	59
8	(Portugal) Diogo Gago	1^{25+14}	2^{18+11}			WD				68	58
9	(Austria) Simon Wagner	Ret^{0+5}	4^{12+7}			Ret	2^{18+13}			55	55
10	(France) Florian Bernardi		1^{25+14}			Ret^{0+6}				45	45
11	(France) Laurent Pellier				1^{25+14}					39	39
12	(India) Amittrajit Ghosh			1^{25+13}						38	38
13	(Austria) Roland Stengg		8^{4}			Ret	5^{10+2}		4^{12+6}	34	34
14	(Russia) Artur Muradian			3^{15+12}	Ret^{0+6}					33	33
15	(Cyprus) Konstantinos Televantos				2^{18+11}					29	29
16	(Czech Republic) Dominik Brož	5^{10+5}	9^{2}			7^{6+4}	Ret	Ret^{0+2}		29	29
17	(Hungary) Norbert Bereczki				3^{15+6}					21	21
18	(Portugal) Ruben Rodrigues	4^{12+7}								19	19
19	(Hungary) Kristóf Klausz						Ret^{0+4}		6^{8+5}	17	17
20	(Cyprus) Christos Mannouris				6^{8+4}					12	12
21	(Spain) Roberto Blach		6^{8+3}							11	11
22	(Portugal) Gil Antunes	6^{8+2}								10	10
23	(Luxembourg) Grégoire Munster						8^{4+3}			7	7
24	(Greece) Chrysostomos Karellis			Ret^{0+4}						4	4
25	(Czech Republic) Matěj Kamenec						Ret^{0+2}			2	2
26	(Hungary) Martin László						Ret^{0+1}			1	1

==== Ladies Trophy ====
Pos	Driver	AZO (Portugal)	CAN (Spain)	ACR (Greece)	CYP (Cyprus)	RMC (Italy)	ZLÍ (Czech Republic)	POL (Poland)	LIE (Latvia)	Points	Best 4
1	(Spain) Emma Falcón	Ret	1	1	1	2	Ret		2	335	290
2	(United Kingdom) Catie Munnings	2	2		2	1	1	1	1	448	280
3	(Italy) Tamara Molinaro	1								37	37

==== ERC Junior U28 ====
Pos	Driver	AZO (Portugal)	CAN (Spain)	RMC (Italy)	ZLÍ (Czech Republic)	POL (Poland)	LIE (Latvia)	Points	Best 4
1	(Russia) Nikolay Gryazin		1^{25+14}	6^{8+7}	1^{25+12}	1^{25+14}	1^{25+14}	169	154
2	(United Kingdom) Chris Ingram	1^{25+13}	Ret	2^{18+12}	3^{15+10}	2^{18+12}	2^{18+10}	151	126
3	(Germany) Fabian Kreim	5^{10+6}	2^{18+12}	1^{25+12}	2^{18+12}	3^{15+10}	4^{12+10}	160	122
4	(Sweden) Fredrik Åhlin	2^{18+9}		3^{15+8}			3^{15+10}	75	75
5	(France) Laurent Pellier	8^{4+3}	4^{12+8}	Ret	4^{12+6}	7^{6+3}	Ret^{0+2}	56	54
6	(United Kingdom) Rhys Yates	3^{15+6}		5^{10+5}	Ret		6^{8+3}	47	47
7	(Czech Republic) Filip Mareš				Ret^{0+6}	5^{10+5}	5^{10+6}	37	37
8	(Czech Republic) Jan Černý			4^{12+8}	5^{10+6}			36	36
9	(Spain) José Antonio Suárez		3^{15+9}					24	24
10	(Poland) Mikołaj Marczyk					4^{12+8}		20	20
11	(Poland) Tomasz Kasperczyk	7^{6}				6^{8+3}		17	17
12	(Poland) Hubert Ptaszek	10^{1}	5^{10+5}			Ret		16	16
13	(Portugal) Luís Rego	4^{12+3}						15	15
14	(France) Pierre-Louis Loubet	9^{2+7}	Ret^{0+4}					13	13
15	(Poland) Aleks Zawada		6^{8+2}		WD			10	10
16	(Italy) Tamara Molinaro	6^{8}						8	8
17	(Slovakia) Martin Koči	Ret^{0+6}						6	6
18	(Norway) Frank Tore Larsen	Ret^{0+3}						3	3

==== ERC Junior U27 ====
Pos	Driver	AZO (Portugal)	CAN (Spain)	RMC (Italy)	ZLÍ (Czech Republic)	POL (Poland)	LIE (Latvia)	Points	Best 4
1	(Latvia) Mārtiņš Sesks	3^{15+11}	2^{18+13}	1^{25+12}	1^{25+13}	Ret	2^{18+12}	162	136
2	(Sweden) Tom Kristensson	Ret	4^{12+7}	2^{18+12}	3^{15+9}	1^{25+13}	1^{25+14}	150	131
3	(Spain) Efrén Llarena	2^{18+10}	Ret^{0+5}	3^{15+12}	7^{6+5}	2^{18+13}		102	97
4	(Portugal) Diogo Gago	1^{25+14}	1^{25+13}	WD				77	67
5	(Italy) Mattia Vita	6^{8+4}	Ret	4^{12+7}	4^{12+4}	4^{12+8}	Ret^{0+3}	70	67
6	(Finland) Miika Hokkanen		6^{8+3}	Ret^{0+3}	Ret	3^{15+10}	3^{15+10}	64	64
7	(Austria) Simon Wagner	Ret^{0+5}	3^{15+9}	Ret	2^{18+13}			60	60
8	(United Kingdom) Catie Munnings	5^{10+4}	9^{2}	5^{10+4}	6^{8+1}	5^{10+6}	5^{10+4}	69	58
9	(Austria) Roland Stengg		7^{6+1}	Ret	5^{10+4}		4^{12+6}	39	39
10	(Czech Republic) Dominik Brož	4^{12+7}	8^{4}	6^{8+4}	Ret	Ret^{0+2}		37	37
11	(Hungary) Kristóf Klausz				Ret^{0+4}		6^{8+6}	18	18
12	(Spain) Roberto Blach		5^{10+5}					15	15
13	(Luxembourg) Grégoire Munster				8^{4+3}			7	7

=== Teams' Championship ===
Pos	Team	Points
1	(Germany) ADAC Opel Rallye Junior Team	209
2	(France) Saintéloc Junior Team	156
3	(Russia) Russian Performance Motorsport	110
4	(Germany) Toksport World Rally Team	109
5	(Latvia) Sport Racing Technologies	84
6	(Germany) Škoda Auto Deutschland	77
7	(Hungary) Mol Racing Team	68
8	(Czech Republic) ACCR Czech Team	66
9	Team Rallye Spain	64
10	(Slovakia) Rufa Sport	57

=== Nations Cup ===
Pos	Team	Points
1	(Germany) ADAC Opel Rallye Junior Team	215
2	(Czech Republic) ACCR Czech Team	152
3	Team Rallye Spain	73
