= Lilian Astier =

French footballer (born 1978)

Personal information
- Date of birth: 12 August 1978 (age 48)
- Place of birth: Le Puy-en-Velay, France
- Height: 1.72 m (5 ft 8 in)
- Position: Defender

Senior career*
| Years | Team | Apps | (Gls) |
| 1995–1998 | Saint-Étienne | 9 | (1) |
| 1998 | → Burgos (loan) | 6 | (0) |
| 1999–2000 | Olympique Alès | | |
| 2000–2001 | AS Béziers | | |
| 2001–2008 | Libourne | | |
| 2008–2010 | FC Mulhouse | | |
| 2010–2011 | AS Béziers | | |

International career
| 1997 | France U18 | | |
- * Club domestic league appearances and goals

Lilian Astier (born 12 August 1978) is a French former professional footballer who played as a defender.

== Career ==
Born in Le Puy-en-Velay, Astier had a promising start to his football career. He trained with the youth teams of Saint-Étienne, and would make his professional debut with the senior club in Ligue 2. After failing to break into Saint-Étienne's first team, he was sent with his compatriot Johann Duveau on a short-term loan to play for Burgos CF in Segunda División B. After his loan expired, Saint-Étienne canceled his contract and he attempted to join OGC Nice. However, his contract with Nice wasn't approved by the league.

Outside of two seasons in Ligue 2 with FC Libourne-Saint-Seurin, Astier would spend the remainder of his career playing in the third and fourth level of French football.

Astier won the 1997 UEFA European Under-18 Championship with France.
