= Ian Stanley Crerar =

Canadian race car driver (born 1965)

Ian Stanley Crerar (born June 19, 1965) is a Canadian race and rally car driver, entrepreneur. He began his racing career on the water in power boat racing in the FE class. Subsequently, he pursued motorcycle racing, in both vintage and twins, in 1995 coming in second place in the R.A.C.E. series, and placing eighth at Daytona in the twins class. In 1993 he came second in the VRRA (Vintage Road Racing Association of Canada) 500 cc class.

== Canadian Rally ==
In 2003 he won the novice class at the Snowy Safari navigational rally in Ontario. Later moving to performance rally in the Canadian Rally Championship, gaining a second place in the P1 class in a Suzuki Swift in the 2005 Rallye Perce Neige in Maniwaki, Quebec.

In a 1977 Porsche 911, Ian came second in Group 5 in the Canadian Association of Rally Sport (CARS) series for 2006. In all, Crerar entered 113 rally events between 2005 and 2017 in a variety of four wheel and two-wheel drive cars.

== Road Racing ==
In 2013 Crerar converted the 1982 Porsche rally car into a vintage road racing car to campaign at Vintage Automobile Racing Association of Canada (VARAC) events. Crerar then built a 2001 Porsche 911 Turbo and ran it in the Canadian Touring Car Championship series in 2014 and 2015. In 2015 Crerar won the Grand Touring Championship.

In 2017 he campaigned the 2001 911 Turbo to win the CASC-OR GT Challenge endurance racing overall championship with co-drivers Guy Tremblay and Andrew Comrie-Picard. Also in 2017 he won the VARAC Classic overall championship in his vintage 1989 Porsche 911.

== World Rally Championship ==
Driving a rented Peugeot 208 R2 in the RC4 class at the World Rally Championship Che Guevera Energy Drink Tour de Corse in Corsica in 2016 with co-driver and fellow Canadian Patrick Levesque, he placed 3rd in class.

In 2017 the pair competed in the WRC Rallye Automobile de Monte-Carlo, in the same car, finishing 13th in RC4.

== FIA R-GT Cup ==
In 2019 Crerar is competing in the FIA-sanctioned R-GT Cup in Europe. He is driving a 2002 Porsche 911 that he converted from street stock to a WRC-level rally car in his Canadian shop and shipped to Europe. At the first event, Rallye Monte Carlo in January 2019, Crerar was unable to finish after damaging the car in a minor off-road excursion. There are eight races in the R-Gt Cup in 2019.

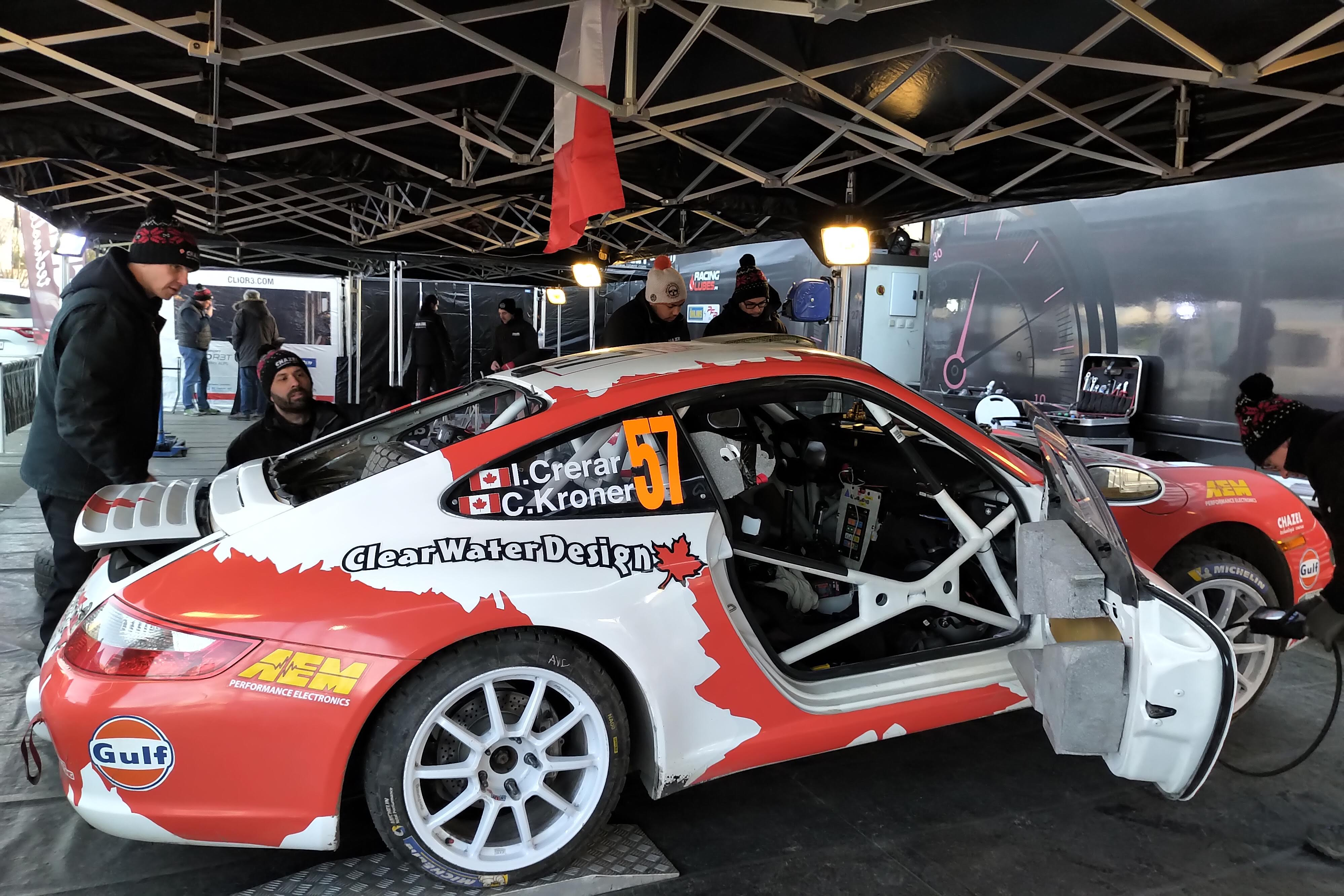
Crerar and his Porsche 911 competing at Rallye Monte Carlo 2019.

In 2015 Crerar became a private sponsor for a family of refugees from Syria in their emigration to Canada.

== Business ==
In 1995 Ian and his wife, Michelle Laframboise, founded Clearwater Design to manufacture polyethylene canoes and kayaks. Ian is the designer and visionary for the company.
