= Alexandre Astier (historian) =

French writer on the religions in India

Alexandre Astier (17 February 1968) is a French writer on the religions in India. He is the author of several books on Hinduism.

He is a member of the "Centre de recherche sur l'Extrême-Orient" of the Université Paris-Sorbonne.

== Publications ==
=== Works ===
- Alexandre Astier (2006). Comprendre l'hindouisme (in French). Paris: Eyrolles. p. 221. ISBN 978-2-7081-3720-2. (This book takes the form of a small textbook allowing everyone to understand the Hindu religion in a simple, clear and fast way and to understand the main historical and structural elements of this religion, from its origins to its development. (...) Strong points: A clear, pedagogical and structured discourse that makes it possible to approach and understand Hinduism in its various aspects; summaries at the end of the chapter make it possible to recall the essential data. And the mention of works of recognized and frequently referenced Indianists. The use of synthetic tables which make it easier to read certain data
- Alexandre Astier (2007). Petite histoire de l'Inde (in French). Paris: Eyrolles. p. 211. ISBN 978-2-212-53925-7.
- Alexandre Astier (2008). Les maîtres spirituels de l'hindouisme (in French). Paris: Eyrolles. p. 238. ISBN 978-2-212-54194-6.
- Alexandre Astier (2008). Citations hindoues expliquées (in French). Paris: Eyrolles. p. 184. ISBN 978-2-212-55539-4.
- Alexandre Astier (2013). L'hindouisme (in French). Paris: Eyrolles. p. 219. ISBN 978-2-212-55213-3. (This book, which presents itself as a "synthesis of introduction and reference on history, foundations, currents and practices" holds all its promises. (...) Very useful for novices, who will see more clearly in the abundance of Indian thought.

=== Articles ===
- Alexandre Astier, "La quête des Indes. Rêver les Indes : Quelques regards européens sur l'Inde entre 1497 et 1947", in Musique et utopies, Paris, Cité de la Musique, 2010, p. 63-74.
- Alexandre Astier (2013). "L'immortalité dans l'hindouisme". Religions & histoire (in French). No. 52. ISSN 1772-7200.
- Alexandre Astier (2014). "Espace et temps. L'au-delà dans l'hindouisme". Religions & histoire (in French). No. 54. ISSN 1772-7200.

=== Thesis ===
In 2014, Alexandre Astier supported a PhD thesis in art history on the iconography of Kubera.: "While the study of Kubera's personality and representations has given rise to a number of works in the past, no in-depth study has been devoted to him, encompassing both his presence in the literature of ancient India and all his different types of images in Hinduism, Buddhism and Jainism.
