= Raphaël Astier =

French modern pentathlete (born 1976)

Personal information
- Nationality: France
- Born: 10 December 1976 (age 49) Alès, Gard
- Height: 1.80 m (5 ft 11 in)
- Weight: 75 kg (165 lb)

Sport
- Sport: Modern pentathlon
- Club: Noyon Pentathlon Moderne (FRA)

Raphaël Astier (born 10 December 1976 in Alès, Gard) is a modern pentathlete from France. He competed at the 2004 Summer Olympics in Athens, where he finished 25th in the men's event with a score of 4,932 points.

Astier achieved his best results in 2003 and in 2005, when he won the gold medals at the Open Asian Modern Pentathlon Championships in Kaohsiung, Taiwan, and at the Bath International Meeting in Bath, England.
