= Fiat 124 Spider (2016) =

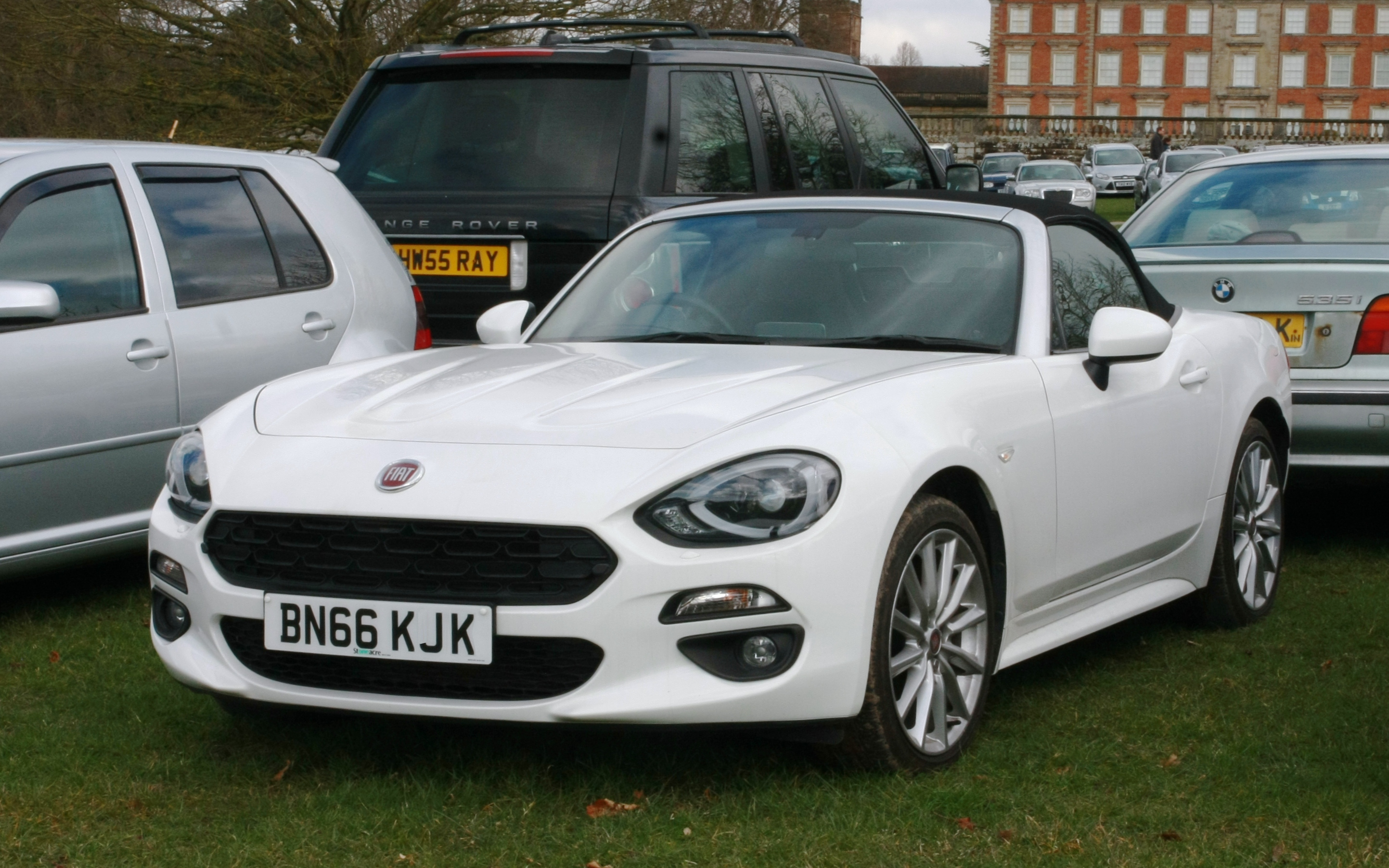

Overview
- Manufacturer: Mazda; FCA Italy
- Also called: Abarth 124 Spider
- Production: 2016–2019 (41,321 produced)
- Model years: 2017–2020
- Assembly: Japan: Hiroshima (Mazda Hiroshima plant)
- Designer: Centro Stile Fiat under Alberto Dilillo; Ruben Wainberg (Abarth)

Body and chassis
- Class: Sports car/roadster (S)
- Body style: 2-door convertible
- Layout: FMR layout
- Related: Mazda MX-5 (ND)

Powertrain
- Engine: 1.4 L FIRE MultiAir I4 (turbocharged gasoline)
- Transmission: 6-speed manual 6-speed automatic Aisin B400

Dimensions
- Wheelbase: 2,310 mm (90.9 in)
- Length: 4,054 mm (159.6 in)
- Width: 1,740 mm (68.5 in)
- Height: 1,233 mm (48.5 in)
- Kerb weight: 1,050–1,080 kg (2,315–2,381 lb)

Chronology
- Predecessor: Fiat Barchetta

The Fiat 124 Spider (Type 348) is a sports car which was made by Mazda and sold by Fiat from 2016 until 2019. It is a two-seater roadster with a front-engine, rear-wheel-drive layout. The result of a partnership between Mazda and Fiat Chrysler Automobiles (FCA), the 124 Spider is largely based on the fourth-generation Mazda MX-5 roadster and was manufactured alongside the MX-5 at Mazda's factory in Hiroshima.

The 124 Spider shares its platform, mechanicals, interior and top mechanism with the MX-5 but is differentiated by its exterior styling, a turbocharged FCA Multiair engine, retuned shock absorbers, and its nominally-increased length and cargo capacity over the MX-5. The 124 nameplate and exterior styling details recall the Pininfarina-designed Fiat 124 Sport Spider, manufactured from 1966 to 1985. It debuted at the 2015 LA Auto Show, and was sold in North America for the 2017 to 2020 model years. Just over 41,000 were produced.

== Background ==
In May 2012, Mazda and Alfa Romeo — at the time a subsidiary of the Fiat Group, now Stellantis — announced a joint venture to manufacture a common rear wheel drive platform. The companies would "develop two differentiated, distinctly styled, iconic and brand specific, lightweight roadsters featuring rear wheel drive", with the two variants offering proprietary engines unique to each brand.

In December 2014, FCA's Sergio Marchionne determined Alfa Romeos would be manufactured only in Italy, saying "some things belong to a place. Alfa belongs to Italy," adding "I remain committed to that architecture, with our powertrain. I'm not sure it will be with Alfa. But it will be with one of our brands." At the time, Alfa Romeos were manufactured only in Italy, while Fiats were manufactured in Italy, but also globally — from Tychy, Poland, to Toluca, Mexico.

With their prior agreement in place — for FCA to market a roadster based on the MX-5 to be manufactured by Mazda at its Hiroshima factory — FCA conceived of marketing a Fiat badged variant in lieu of the Alfa Romeo variant. In August 2016, FCA formally announced the Fiat 124 Spider based on the Mazda ND platform.

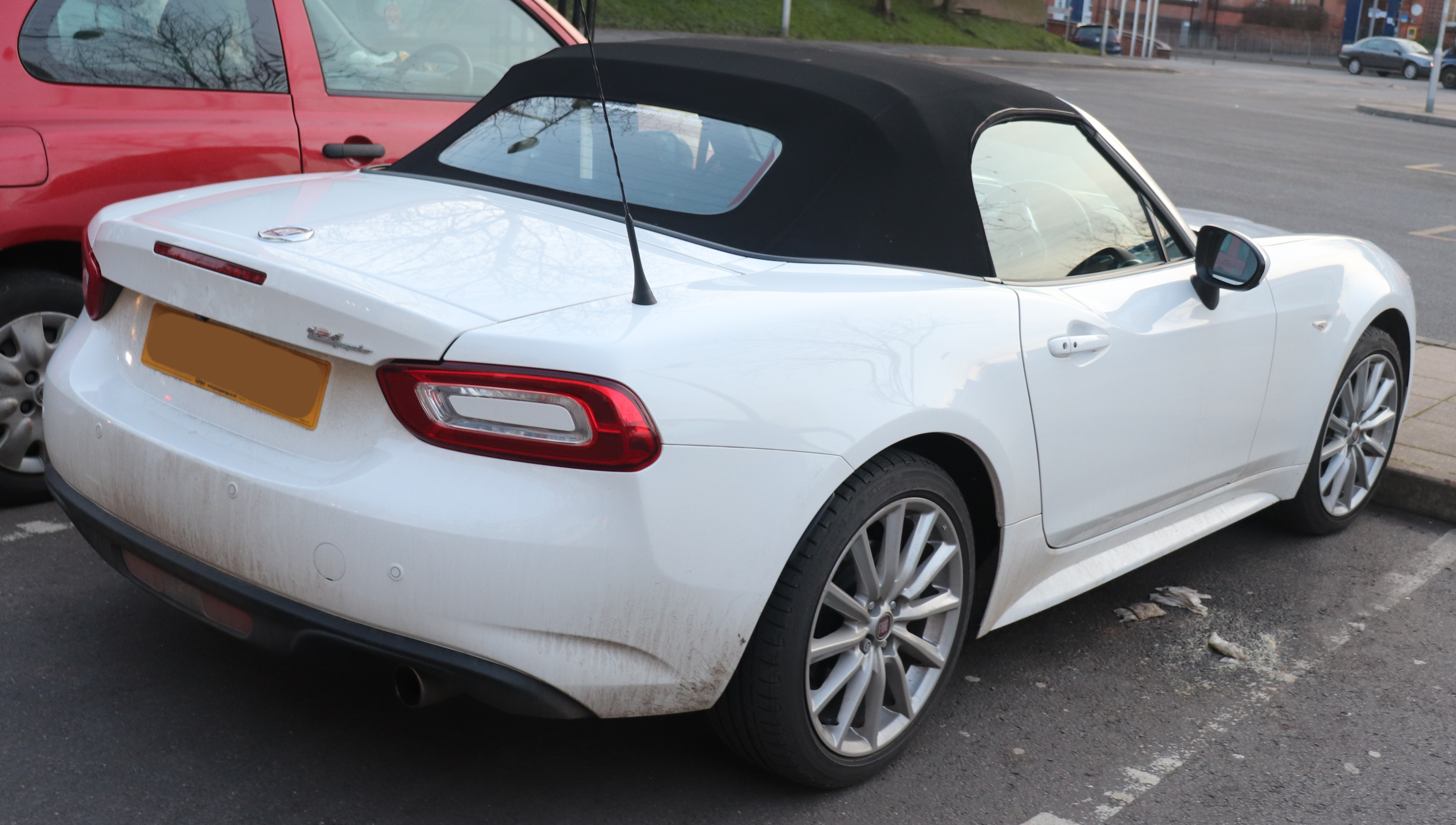
The 124 Spider, rear

In December 2016, the Detroit News said "In partnering with Mazda’s MX-5 Miata to resurrect the classic Fiat 124 Spider, Fiat Chrysler not only gained a halo sports car for its struggling Italian brand, but likely saved the most celebrated small sports car of the past 25 years (the MX-5)" — citing the markedly increased cost of developing a new car at the time and "the costliest wave of government regulation since the 1970s."

In January 2019, FCA announced the Fiat 124 Spider was to be withdrawn from the market in the United Kingdom with immediate effect. The Abarth 124 Spider continued to be sold, but this too was withdrawn from the UK market in April 2019.

On 23 December 2020, Stellantis announced the 124 Spider and 500 were to be withdrawn from their North American model lineup after the 2020 model year and would not return for 2021, as is the situation with 500L. These models were expected to sell into 2021 until stock depletion.

== Specifications ==
The 124 Spider was powered by Fiat's 1.4 litre FIRE Multiair turbocharged inline-four, producing 140 PS (103 kW; 138 hp) and 240 N⋅m (177 lb⋅ft) of torque in European specification—and 160 hp (117 kW) and 184 lb⋅ft (249 N⋅m) of torque in North American specification. The 124 manual transmission is from the third generation MX-5's six speed transmission to cope with the turbo's torque.

Multiair is a hydraulically actuated variable valve timing (VVT) engine technology enabling "cylinder by cylinder, stroke by stroke" control of intake air directly via a gasoline engine's inlet valves. Developed by Fiat Powertrain Technologies, the technology bypasses a primary engine inefficiency: pumping losses caused by restriction of the intake passage by the throttle plate, used to regulate air feeding the cylinders.

=== Engines and performance ===
Note: MT6 = six speed manual transmission, AT6 = six speed automatic transmission.

Model	Engine type	Power	Torque	Trans.	0–100 km/h (0–62 mph)	Top speed	CO_{2} emissions
Fiat 124 Spider	1,368 cc I4 MultiAir turbo (petrol)	140 PS (103 kW; 138 hp) at 5,000 rpm	240 N⋅m (177 lbf⋅ft) at 2,250 rpm	MT6	7.5 s	215 km/h (134 mph)	148 g/km
Fiat 124 Spider	1,368 cc I4 MultiAir turbo (petrol)	140 PS (103 kW; 138 hp) at 5,000 rpm	240 N⋅m (177 lbf⋅ft) at 2,250 rpm	AT6	7.6 s	214 km/h (133 mph)	153 g/km
Abarth 124 Spider	1,368 cc I4 MultiAir turbo (petrol)	170 PS (125 kW; 168 hp) at 5,500 rpm	250 N⋅m (184 lbf⋅ft) at 2,500 rpm	MT6	6.8 s	232 km/h (144 mph)	148 g/km
Abarth 124 Spider	1,368 cc I4 MultiAir turbo (petrol)	170 PS (125 kW; 168 hp) at 5,500 rpm	250 N⋅m (184 lbf⋅ft) at 2,500 rpm	AT6	6.9 s	229 km/h (142 mph)	153 g/km

=== Engines and performance, North American models ===
Note: MT6 = six speed manual transmission, AT6 = six speed automatic transmission.

Model	Engine type	Power	Torque	Trans.	0–60 mph (0–97 km/h)	Top speed	Fuel economy (combined)	CO_{2} emissions
Fiat 124 Spider	1,368 cc I4 MultiAir turbo (petrol)	160 hp (117 kW) at 5,500 rpm	184 lb⋅ft (249 N⋅m) at 2,500 rpm	MT6	6.8 s	n/a	30 mpg_{‑US} (7.8 L/100 km)	298 g/mi
Fiat 124 Spider	1,368 cc I4 MultiAir turbo (petrol)	160 hp (117 kW) at 5,500 rpm	184 lb⋅ft (249 N⋅m) at 2,500 rpm	AT6	6.8 s	n/a	29 mpg_{‑US} (8.1 L/100 km)	302 g/mi
Fiat 124 Spider Abarth	1,368 cc I4 MultiAir turbo (petrol)	164 hp (122 kW) at 5,500 rpm	184 lb⋅ft (249 N⋅m) at 2,500 rpm	MT6	n/a	n/a	n/a	n/a
Fiat 124 Spider Abarth	1,368 cc I4 MultiAir turbo (petrol)	164 hp (122 kW) at 5,500 rpm	184 lb⋅ft (249 N⋅m) at 2,500 rpm	AT6	n/a	n/a	n/a	n/a

== Limited editions ==
At the 124's debut, Fiat marketed a 124 Spider Anniversary edition, with 124 units carrying the designation—to commemorate the 50th anniversary of original 124 Sport Spider. Including features of the 124 Spider Lusso Plus trim, the edition also includes chromed mirrors, red '124' badge on the front grille, interior numbered plaque, red exterior and black leather interior.

== Abarth 124 Spider ==
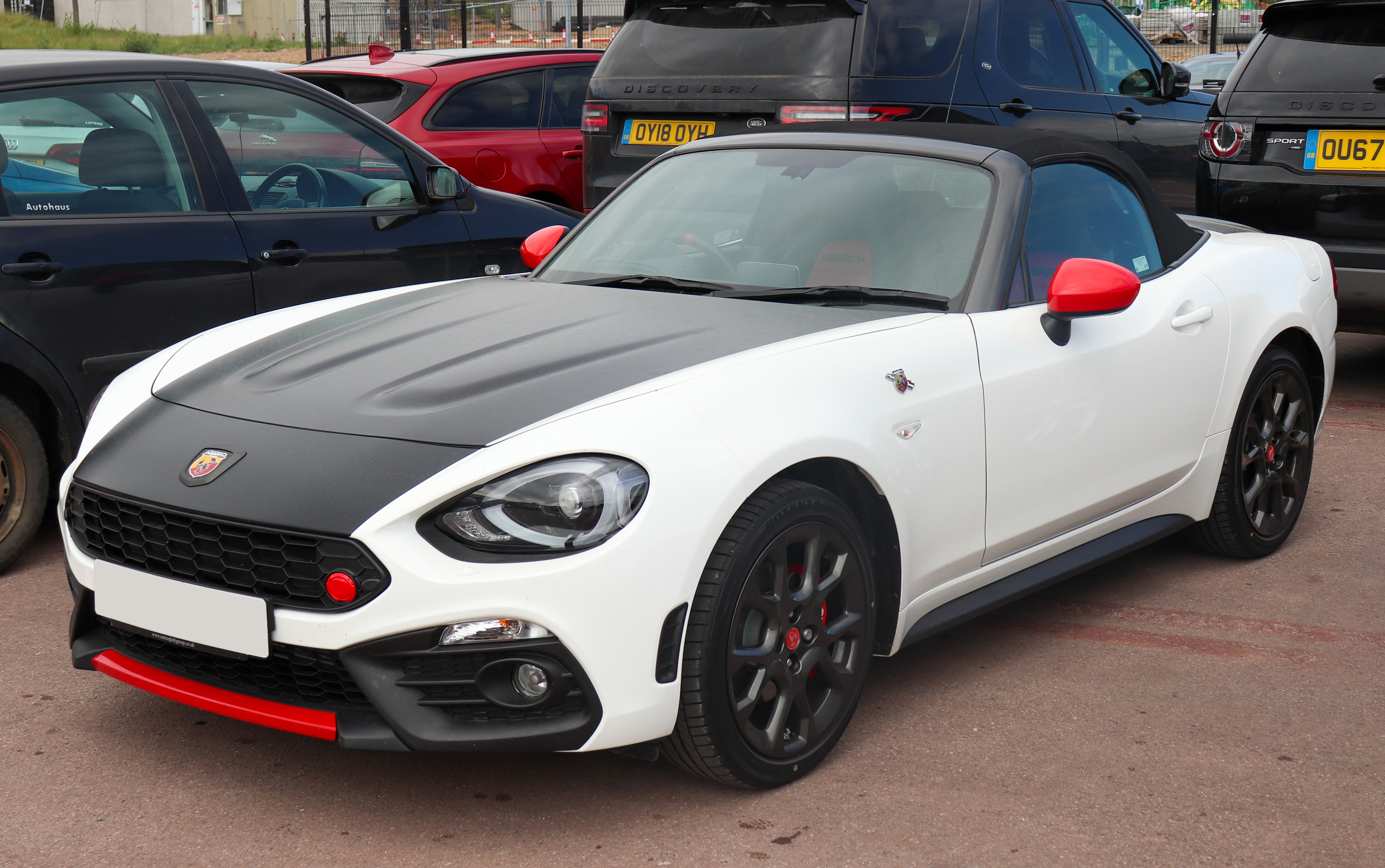
Abarth 124 Spider

The Abarth 124 Spider is a performance version of the Fiat 124 Spider manufactured by Mazda for FCA under the Abarth marque. It was introduced at the 2016 Geneva Motor Show, along with the rally version, the Abarth 124 Rally. Final assembly of the car takes place in the Officine Abarth in Turin, Italy, where the model specific parts are installed on the Japanese built roadster.

The Abarth 124 carries over the 1,368 cc (1.4 L; 83.5 cu in) MultiAir turbo I4, upgraded to deliver 170 PS (125 kW; 168 bhp) at 5,500 rpm and 250 N⋅m (184 lb⋅ft) of torque at 2500 rpm. It has a top speed of 232 km/h (144 mph) and can accelerate from 0–100 km/h (62 mph) in 6.8 seconds.

The Abarth 124 Spider features many changes from its counterpart at Fiat. On the exterior, these include Abarth badging, an optional black racing stripe hand painted on the hood and decklid, and 17 inch aluminium wheels. The interior features heated black leather and microfiber sport seats with the option of leather and Alcantara suede Recaro seats.

It also features a leather wrapped sport steering wheel and gear knob, as well as red accent stitching.

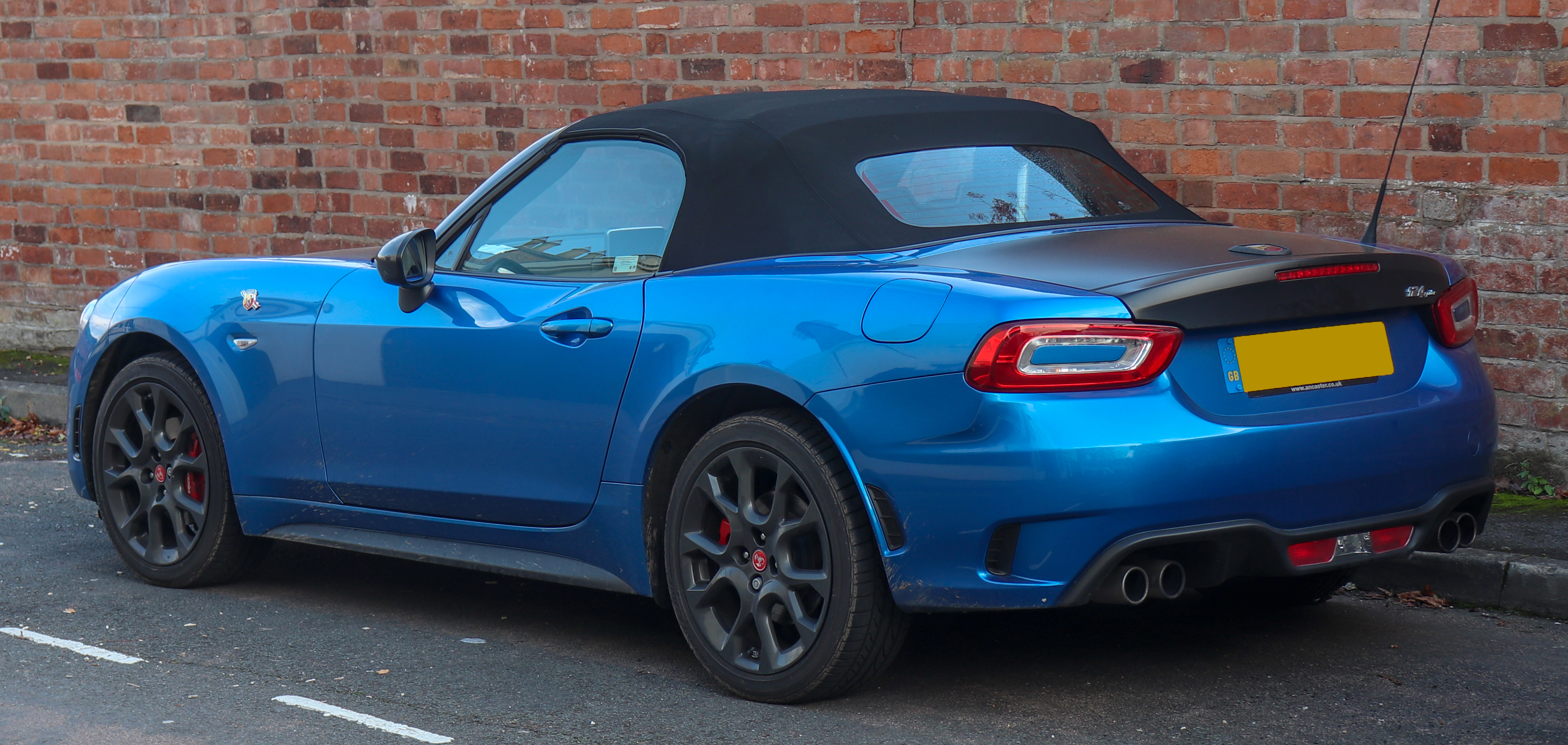
Rear

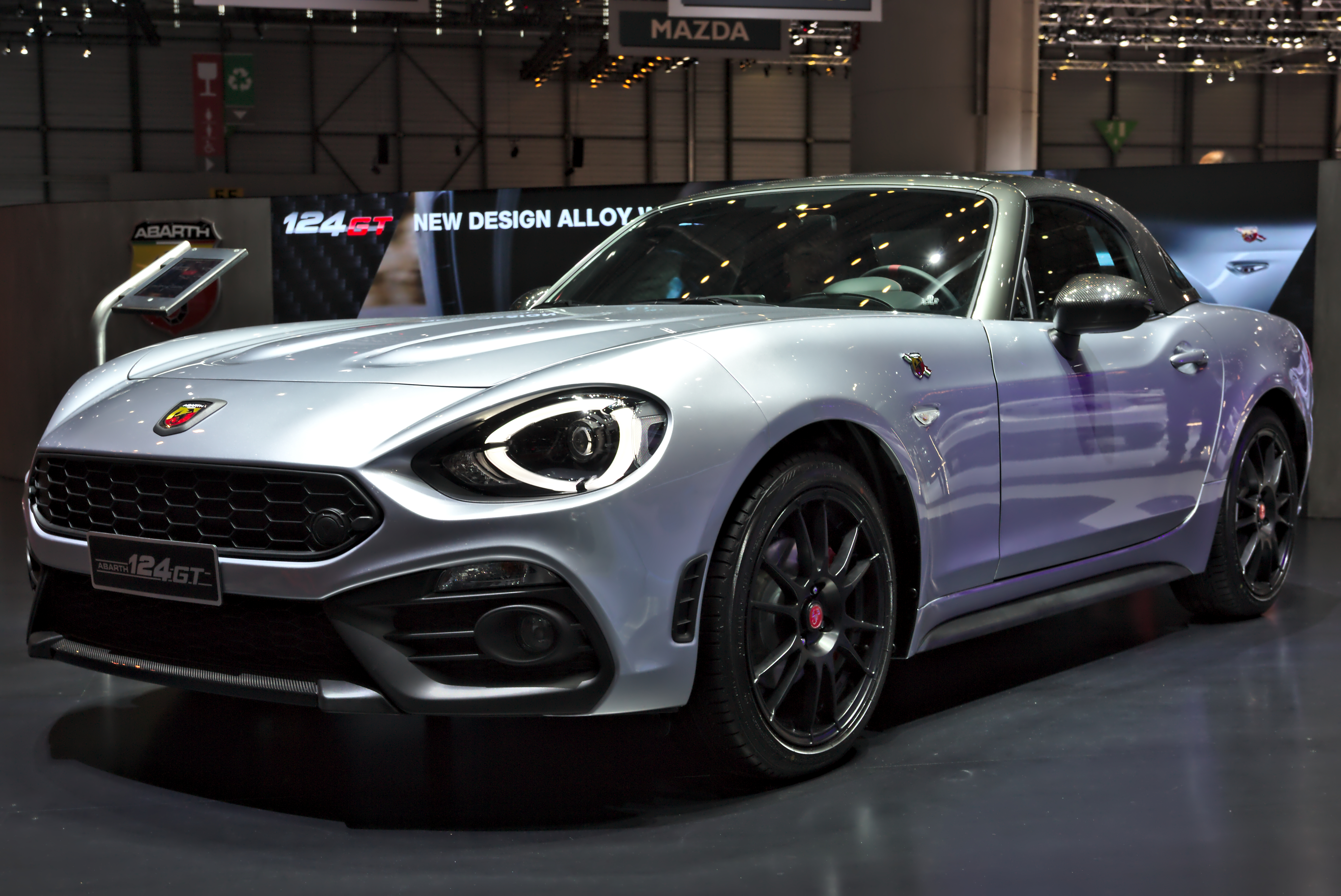
Abarth 124 GT at the 2018 Geneva Motor Show

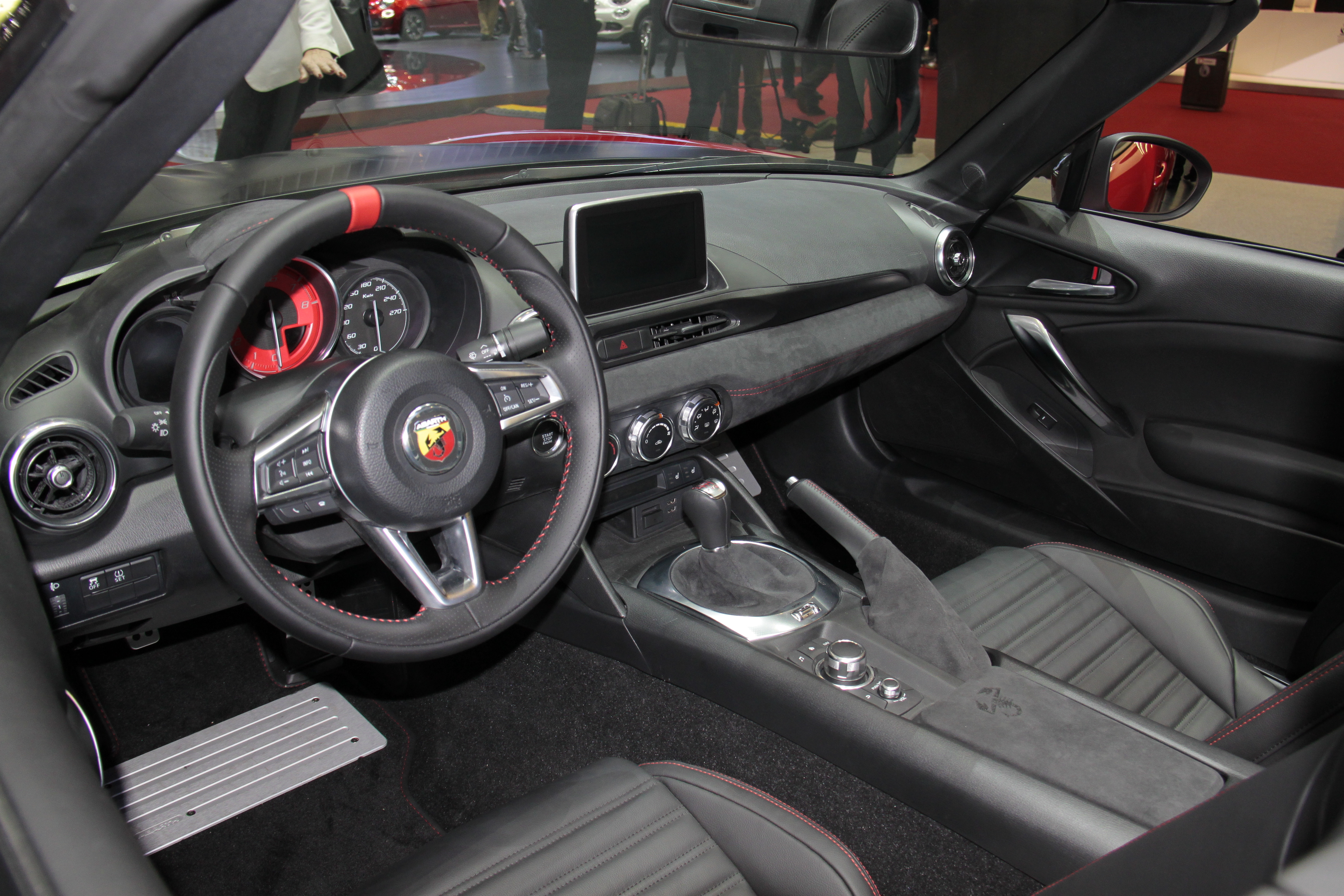
Interior

=== Fiat 124 Spider Abarth ===
The North American-spec version was originally announced at the 2016 New York International Auto Show as the Fiat 124 Spider Elaborazione Abarth (meaning "tuned by Abarth"), with equipment roughly equivalent to the Mazda MX-5 Miata's Club Package. Unlike the standard Abarth model, it did not feature any power increase over the standard Fiat 124 Spider however, the Canadian model did carry the horsepower increase with a sport mode selector below the shifter. These wore Fiat badges instead of Abarth badges, aside for the Elaborazione Abarth badges on the front fenders. However the 124 Spider Elaborazione Abarth was cancelled in favour of the standard Abarth model, sold as the Fiat 124 Spider Abarth due to Abarth's status as a performance trim in North America rather than a full brand. Although it wore full exterior Abarth badging, it used the Fiat badge on the steering wheel up until the 2019 model-year, due to the airbag recertification.

=== Abarth 124 Spider Rally ===
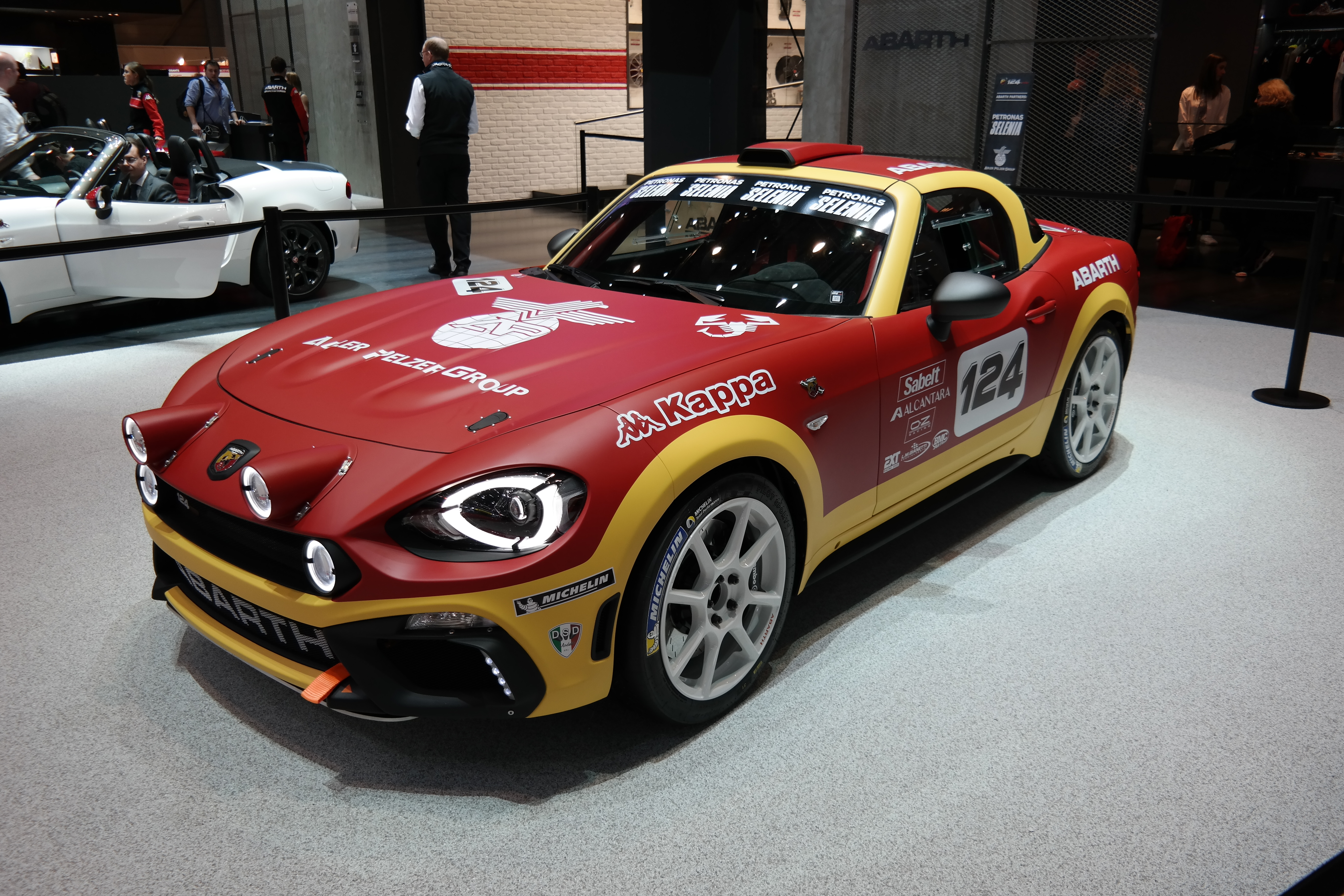
Abarth 124 Spider Rally

The Abarth 124 Spider Rally is a rally version of the 124 homologated in the FIA R-GT category. It has a 1.8 litre turbocharged engine with 300 PS (221 kW; 296 hp) at 6,500 rpm.

== Reception ==
Jeremy Clarkson, in his "Driving" column of The Sunday Times, gave the Fiat 124 Spider three out of five stars, saying that "You'd expect the Fiat, being Italian and all, to be sportier and more manic than the MX-5, but actually it's quieter and less fun."

== Sales ==
Year	Europe	U.S.	Canada	Total
2016	3,717	2,475	258	6,450
2017	7,831	4,478	601	12,910
2018	7,637	3,515	284	11,436
2019	4,717	2,644	205	7,566
2020	76	1,711	165	1,952
2021		955	52	1,007
Total	23,978	15,778	1,565	41,321
