= Catania-Etna =

Car competition in Catania, Sicily, Italy

Cronoscalata Catania-Etna
- Location: Sicily, Italy
- Opened: 1923
- Major Events: Trofeo Cronosprint
- Hill Length: 9.2 kilometres (5.7 mi)

The Catania-Etna (from 1969 to 1972 Corsa dell'Etna) is a car competition, more precisely a hillclimb, which takes place annually in province of Catania. It is valid for the Cronosprint Trophy. It is organized by the Automobile Club d'Italia of Catania.

== History ==
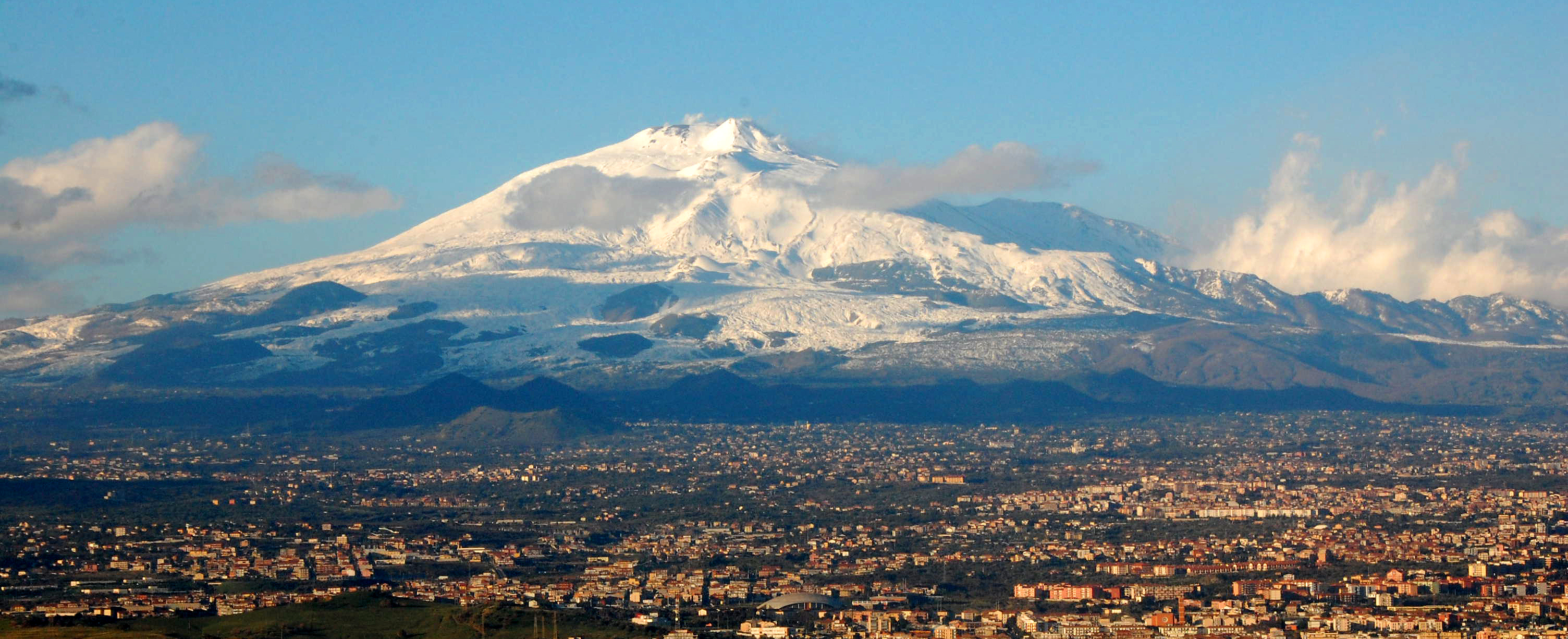
Mount Etna

The first edition was organized on June 8, 1924 from Unione Sportiva Catanese (ancestor of the team of football of Catania) and took place between the Piazza Duomo di Catania and Zafferana Etnea passing through the Barrier of the Forest, Sant'Agata li Battiati, San Giovanni la Punta, Trecastagni, Viagrande and Fleri. Over the years, the journey has undergone various changes: from 1939 to Casa cantoniera after Nicolosi; from 1969 the path became Nicolosi (Sapienza refuge); since 1973 there was even the transfer to the Autodromo di Pergusa; from 1980 he returned to Etna, from the cantonal house of Nicolosi to Piano Bottara thanks to the union of the three stables: Catania Corse, Puntese and Etna and to Italo Cultrera.

Interrupted in 1983 following the lava flow that invaded the Provincial Road 92, the Corsa was restored in 1995 on the initiative of the President of the Province Nello Musumeci, who also reopened the interrupted road to traffic. The start was located in the avenue of the Nicolosi region, but due to the danger of the first bend (viale della Regione at the corner of via Etnea), it was moved to the "Pini", next to the ice skating rink. The arrival, however, was at the San Leo crossroads. In 2004, with the modification of the regional law wanted by Musumeci himself and proposed by the deputy Gino Ioppolo, the race was authorized on a route of almost ten kilometers, always on the Nicolosi-Rifugio Sapienza.

== Winners ==
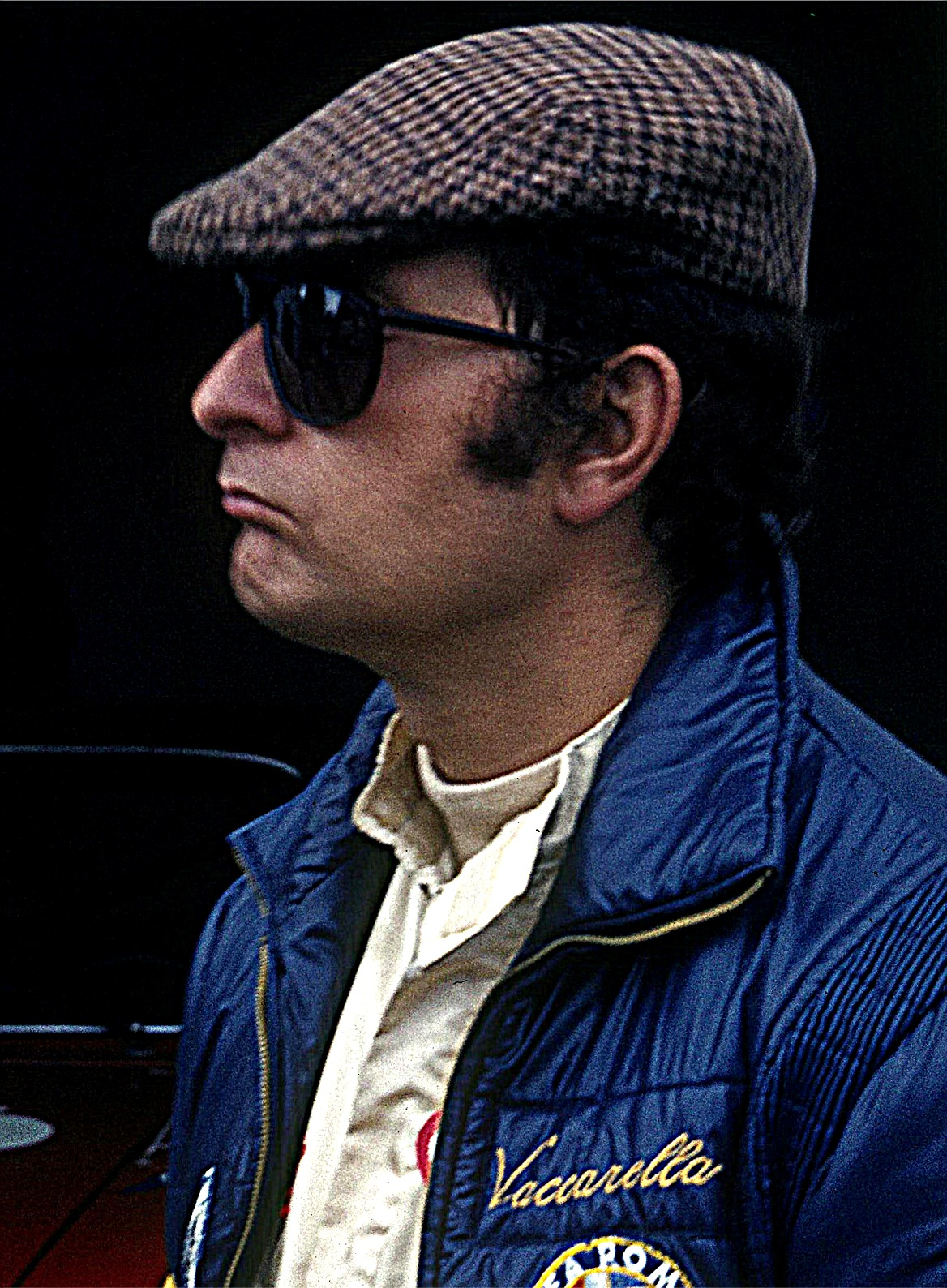
Nino Vaccarella, winner in 1959

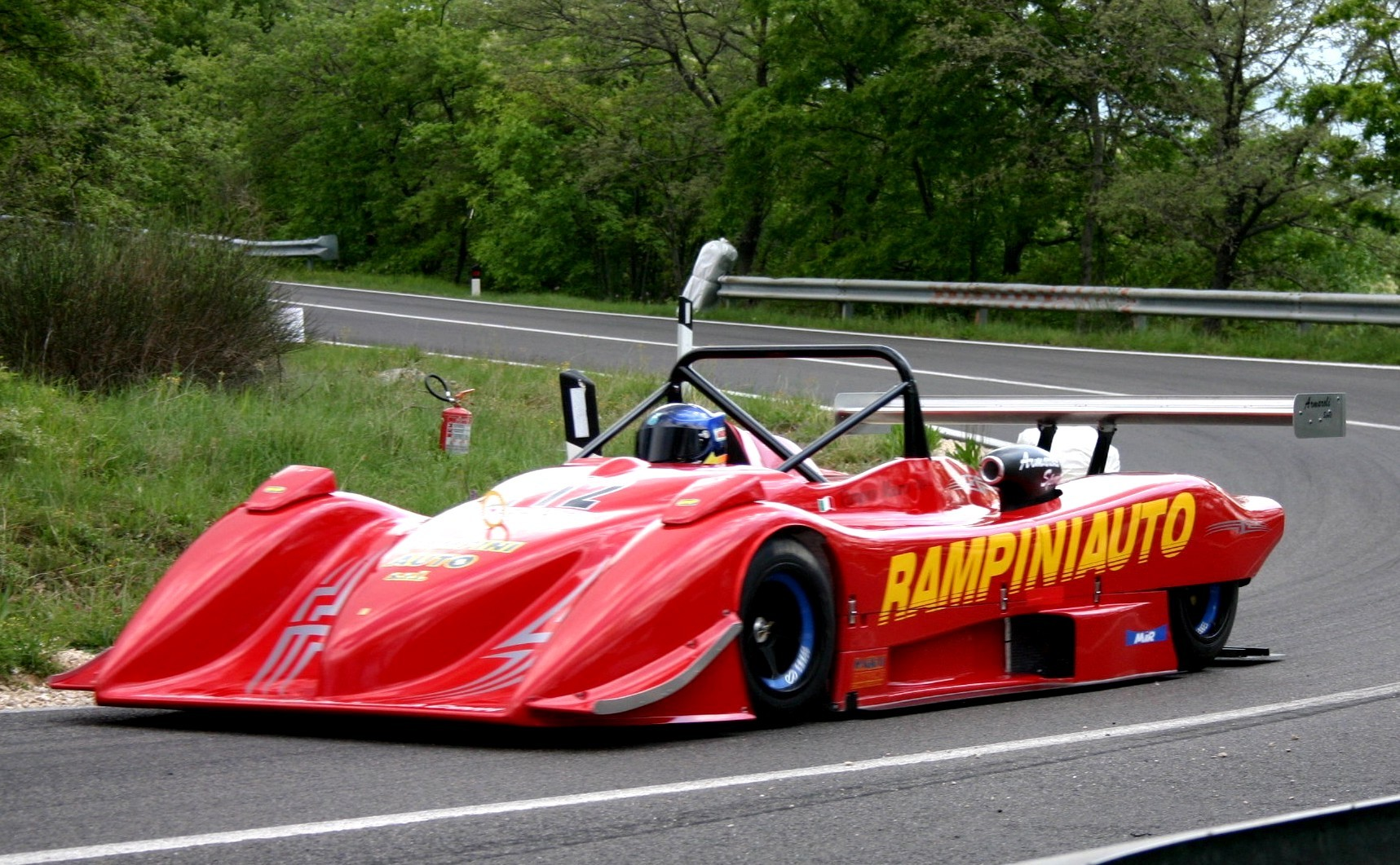
Osella Pa20/S BMW

- An edition 0 took place in 1923 which saw Paolo Catania as winner, on Nazzaro and which had as a nomenclature "Catania-Trecastagni"
- 1924: Salvatore Ignoto su Ceirano (18' 14" 4, 24 km)
- 1931: Alfio Parlato su Alfa Romeo 1750 (17' 19" 6)
- 1939: Lotario Rangoni su Alfa Romeo 2300 (20' 23", 29 km)
- 1947: Giovanni Rocco su Alfa Romeo 2300 (20' 24", 33,5 km)
- 1948: Luigi Bellucci su Lancia 1500 (22' 28" 4, 33 km)
- 1949: Pasquale Placido su Stanguellini (23' 09" 1)
- 1950: Giovanni Bracco su Ferrari (20' 45")
- 1951: Piero Scotti su Ferrari 2560 (21' 37")
- 1952: Piero Scotti su Ferrari 4100 (21' 26" 2)
- 1953: Eugenio Castellotti su Lancia D24 (19' 13" 3)
- 1954: Piero Taruffi su Lancia D24 (19' 13" 2)
- 1955: Maria Teresa de Filippis su Maserati 2000 (21' 24" 4, 38 km)
- 1956: Luigi Bellucci su Maserati 2000 (21' 48" 5)
- 1959: Nino Vaccarella su Cooper-Maserati (17' 56" 2, 33 km)
- 1960: Mennato Boffa su Maserati 2000 (18' 17" 4)
- 1961: Mennato Boffa su Maserati 2000 (18' 01" 7)
- 1962: Odoardo Govoni su Maserati (17' 12" 2)
- 1963: Odoardo Lualdi su Ferrari (14' 46" 1, 28,2 km)
- 1967: Spartaco Dini su Alfa Romeo GT (n.d., 33 km)
- 1968: Salvatore Calascibetta su Abarth 1000 (17' 48" 6)
- 1969: Ignazio Capuano su Porsche 910 (9' 30", 18 km)
- 1970: Domenico Scola su Abarth 2000 (9' 12" 7)
- 1972: Domenico Scola su Chevron B/21 (9' 01" 8)
- 1973: Pasquale Barberio su Lola Abarth – Pergusa
- 1974: Angelo Giliberti (The king) su Alpine Renault – Pergusa
- 1975: Pasquale Barberio su Osella Pa/3 – Pergusa
- 1976: Enrico Grimaldi su Osella Pa/4 – Pergusa
- 1977: Eugenio Renna (Amphicar) su Osella Pa/5 – Pergusa
- 1980: Mario Casciaro su Lola BMW (5' 24" 13, 10,2 km)
- 1981: Enrico Grimaldi su Osella Pa/9 (5' 15" 78)
- 1982: Mario Casciaro su Lola Toleman (5' 16" 63, 10,3 km)
- 1995: Enrico Grimaldi su Osella Pa/9 (4' 03" 31, 10,6 km)
- 1996: Angelo Palazzo su GISA – Alfa Romeo (4' 04" 28)
- 1997: Giovanni Cassibba su Osella Pa20 BMW (3' 56" 85)
- 1998: Giovanni Cassibba su Osella Pa20 (1' 54" 50, 5,3 km)
- 1999: Enrico Grimaldi su Osella Pa20s/99 Honda (3' 26" 88, 10 km)
- 2000: Fabrizio Fattorini su Osella Pa20s/99 Honda (3' 57" 77, 9,4 km)
- 2001: Andrea Raiti su Osella Pa20s BMW (4' 14" 75)
- 2002: Andrea Raiti su Osella Pa20s BMW (3' 54" 44)
- 2004: Fabrizio Fattorini su Osella Pa21 Honda (3' 58" 54, 9,2 km)
- 2005: Giovanni Cassibba su Osella BMW (4' 01" 26)
- 2006: Carmelo Scaramozzino su Breda Racing BMW CN 3000 (3' 57" 62)
- 2008: Carmelo Scaramozzino su Breda Racing BMW E2 B 3000 (3'57"537)
- 2009: Carmelo Scaramozzino su Lola Zytek (3'49"867)
- 2010: Interrupted and canceled for the Rocco Russo accident.

There were no races from 1925 to 1929, from 1932 to 1938, from 1940 to 1946, in 1957 and 1958, from 1964 to 1966, in 1971, 1978 and 1979 (five editions were held in Pergusa), from 1983 to 1994 and in 2003.

The 46th edition should take place in July 2020.

== Bibliography ==
- Il fascino della gara più bella. «La Sicilia», 9 settembre 2006, CT35.

== See also ==
- Nissena Cup (Hill Climb)
- Giarre-Montesalice-Milo (Hill Climb)
- Monti Iblei Cup (Hill Climb)
