= GISA (sports prototype) =

- Company type: Società a responsabilità limitata
- Industry: Automobiles
- Founded: 1991 in Biancavilla, Sicily, Italy
- Founder: Salvatore Giardina
- Headquarters: Biancavilla, Sicily, Italy
- Products: Sports prototype
- Website: gisaprototipi.com

GISA or GISA prototipi is an Italian manufacturer of sports prototype category CN cars destined for the hillclimbing and the prototype championships on the track.

== History ==
GISA was born in Biancavilla, common on the slopes of Etna, in 1991 due to the will and passion of Salvatore Giardina, after an intense activity matured in the world of competitions both as a driver of grand touring cars and as a preparer.

== Automobiles ==
The GISA cars are two-seater and single-seater, with rigid tubular semi-load-bearing steel frame covered with super light aluminum alloy panels or molded carbon fiber panels. The front and rear suspensions are formed by overlapping triangles (Push Road) with shock absorbers and springs produced by the company itself; on request, as well as with an engine of own production, they can be coupled with engines of other car manufacturers (Alfa Romeo, BMW, Renault) and a sequential Hewland FTR / JFR gearbox and steering wheel controls. Tires can vary in conventional configuration (Ant. 8.2 / 20.0-13 Post. 12.5 / 23.0-13), (Ant. 7.5 / 20.0-13 Post. 10.5 / 23.0-13) and radial (Ant. 195 / 530-13 Post. 290 / 570-13), (Ant. 195 / 530-13 Post. 250 / 570-13). The double braking system usually consists of 4-piston calipers and self-ventilated front and rear discs. The rubber tank (FIA) is available with a capacity of 12 L for uphill competitions and 45 L for track competitions.

== GISA engine ==
The current "GISA Engine" has a total weight of 70 kg. It is a 4-cylinder in-line engine with a displacement of 1570 cm³ which manages to deliver 245 HP at a maximum speed of 12100 revolutions and 248 HP.

== Design ==
The design and construction take place in the following order:

- 3D modeling of the part in a CAD modeler;
- Assembly and Verification of the part in the Assembly model;
- Export of the 3D model to a compatible machine format;
- Part realization as "prototype" in PLA, ABS, Wood, PU or other material;
- Check part functionality;
- Final part realization with part CNC machine tool;
- Cleaning and finishing;
- Anodizing, polishing or painting of the part;
- Assembly of the final product.

== Production departments ==
The company is made up of the following departments:

- Mechanical processing department;
- Modeling and molds;
- Bodywork (layering with carbon fiber or fiberglass);
- Frame and suspension production department;
- Assembly department.

== See also ==
- Nissena Cup (Hill Climb)
- Catania-Etna (Hill Climb)
- Giarre-Montesalice-Milo (Hill Climb)
- Monti Iblei Cup (Hill Climb)
