= Giarre-Montesalice-Milo =

Cronoscalata Giarre-Montesalice-Milo
- Location: Sicily, Italy
- Opened: 1979
- Hill Length: 6.4 kilometres (4.0 mi)

The Giarre-Montesalice-Milo, or simply Giarre-Milo, is a 6.4 km Hillclimb that takes place on the municipal territories of Giarre, Santa Venerina and Milo in province of Catania.

== History ==
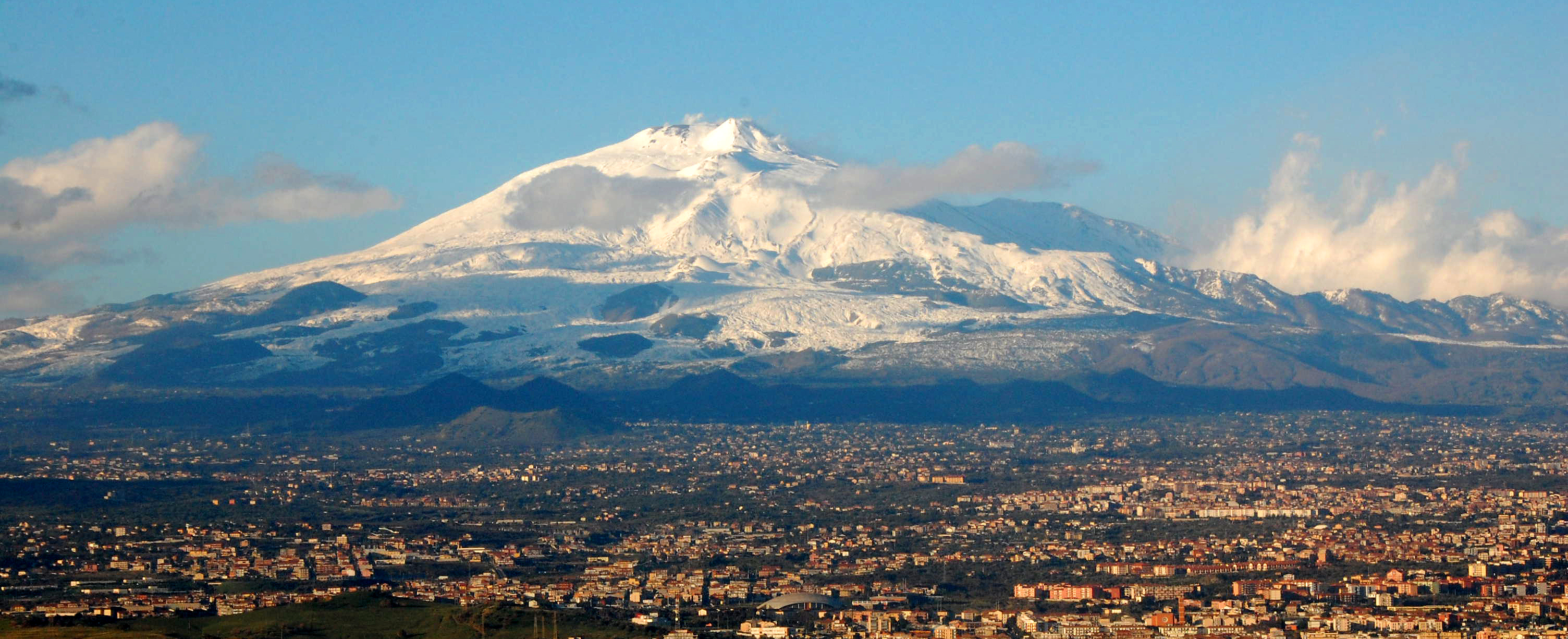
Mount Etna

The event was born in 1979 thanks to Pro Loco of Giarre, chaired by cav. Isidoro Di Grazia who, with the technical / organizational collaboration of the Automobile Club Acireale, made it an annual appointment until 1989. Subsequently, due to economic and administrative difficulties it was suspended and was reorganized in 2007 by the Automobile Club Acireale with the collaboration of local sports associations and the contribution of the Sicilian Region and of the Province of Catania. Further along the route, which benefits from a further 200 meters which will move the arrival to the town of Milo (on the eastern slopes of the Etna) near the new municipal amphitheater. In the year 2011 due to bureaucratic and administrative difficulties it was suspended again. In 2014 the A.C. Acireale, with the collaboration of the Giarre Corse and in synergy with all the Catania stables, restarted the sporting event with the intention of making it definitively an annual event.

== Route ==
The road sections are via San Paolo in the municipal area of Giarre (fraction of Macchia), the former Guddi-Miscarello-Salice-Milo Regional Road, owned by the Regional Province of Catania which for a stretch of about 1 km falls in the municipal area of Santa Venerina, and via Monsignor Fichera in the municipal area of Milo.

== Winners ==
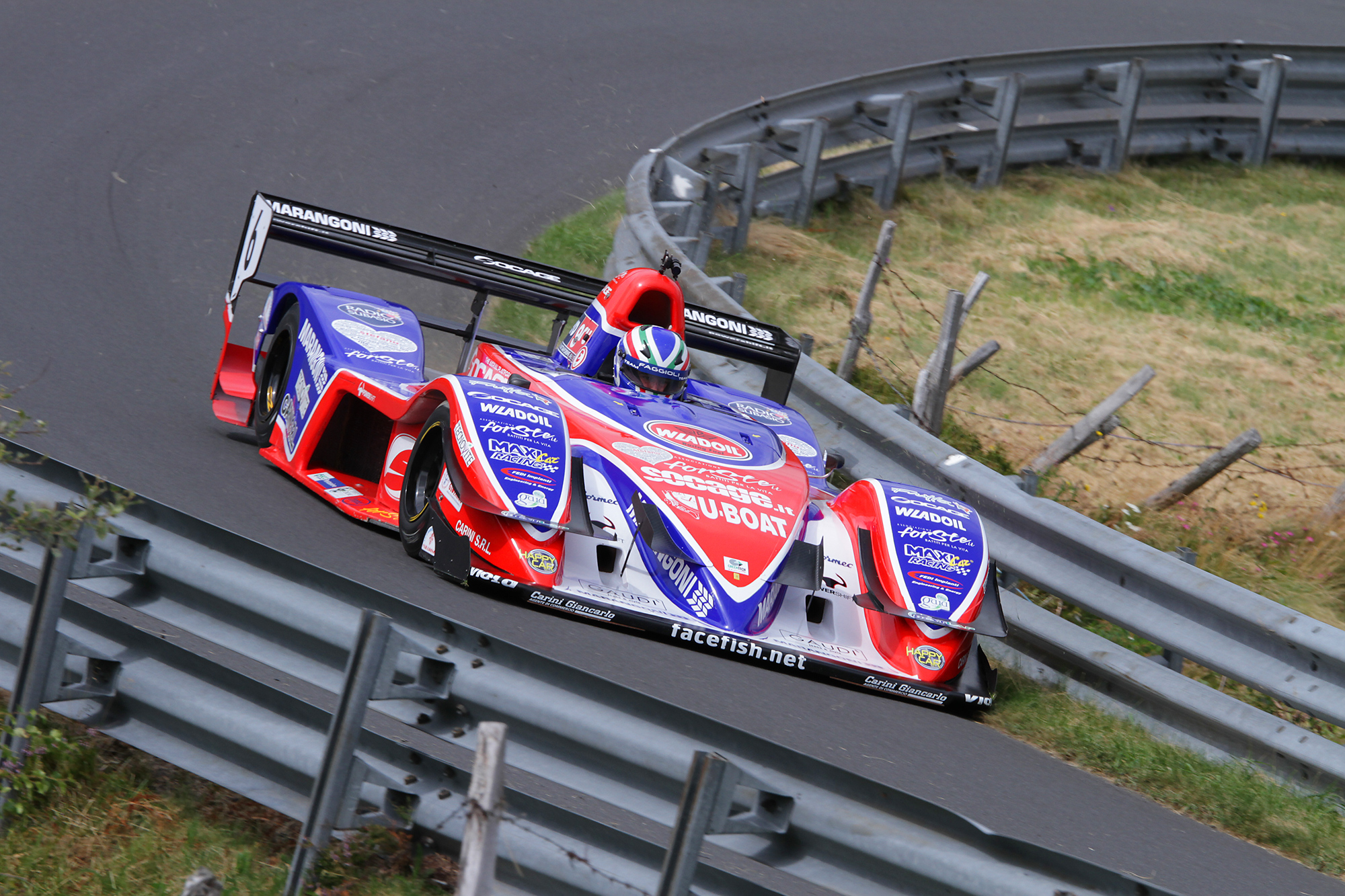
Osella FA30

The winners are as follows:

- 1979 Enrico Grimaldi
- 1980 Enrico Grimaldi
- 1981 Enrico Grimaldi
- 1982 Alfio Canino
- 1983 Benny Rosolia
- 1984 Giovanni Cassibba
- 1985 Enrico Grimaldi
- 1986 Enrico Grimaldi
- 1987 Giovanni Cassibba
- 1988 Enrico Grimaldi
- 1989 Enrico Grimaldi
- 2006 Angelo Palazzo su GISA-BMW
- 2007 Giovanni Cassibba su Osella PA20/S BMW
- 2008 Giovanni Cassibba su Osella PA20/S
- 2009 Angelo Palazzo su GISA-BMW
- 2010 Luigi Bruccoleri su Radical
- 2014 Domenico Scola su Osella PA2000
- 2015 Domenico Cubeda su Osella PA2000
- 2016 Domenico Scola su Osella FA30
- 2017 Domenico Cubeda su Osella FA30
- 2018 Domenico Cubeda su Osella FA30
- 2019 Luca Caruso su Osella PA2000

== See also ==
- Catania-Etna (Hill Climb)
- Nissena Cup (Hill Climb)
- Monti Iblei Cup (Hill Climb)
