= Alfa Romeo Abarth 2000 Coupe =

Overview
- Manufacturer: Abarth/Alfa Romeo
- Production: 1954
- Designer: Giovanni Savonuzzi

Body and chassis
- Class: Sports car
- Layout: FR

Powertrain
- Engine: 1,975 cc (2.0 L; 120.5 cu in) I4
- Transmission: 4-speed manual

Dimensions
- Wheelbase: 2,630 mm (103.5 in)
- Curb weight: 890 kg (1,962 lb)

The Alfa Romeo Abarth 2000 Coupe (also known as the Abarth-Alfa Romeo 2000 Coupe) is a one-off concept car produced by Abarth, in collaboration with Alfa Romeo, and designed by Ghia, in 1954.

== History ==
The coupe was designed by Italian automotive designer Giovanni Savonuzzi, who based it on the design of the Alfa Romeo 1900 Super Sprint, and was later presented by Virgilio Conrero at the 1954 Turin and Paris Motor Shows. The engine is a two-valve per cylinder, Alfa Romeo 1975 cc four-cylinder, producing 135 hp (101 kW) @ 6,600 rpm, with a compression ratio of 8.5:1, and drives the rear wheels via a four-speed manual transmission. This propels the car to a top speed of 200 km/h (120 mph). The car use a conventional front-engine, rear-wheel-drive layout, with the whole package weighing only 890 kg (1,960 lb).
