= Fiat Abarth OTR 1000 =

Subcompact automobile

Overview
- Manufacturer: Abarth
- Also called: Fiat Abarth 1000 OTR
- Production: 1964—1969
- Assembly: Turin, Italy

Body and chassis
- Class: Supermini (B)
- Body style: 2-door saloon 2-door coupé
- Layout: Rear-engine, rear-wheel-drive
- Related: Fiat 850

Powertrain
- Engine: 982 cc Abarth Sigla 200 I4
- Transmission: 4-speed manual

Dimensions
- Wheelbase: 2,027 mm (79.8 in)

The Fiat Abarth OTR 1000, alternatively known as Fiat Abarth 1000 OTR, is a sport subcompact model automobile produced by the Italian automobile manufacturer Abarth. With its special "Radiale" engine, it was built between 1964 and 1969 in various versions in very small numbers based on the Fiat 850.

== Description ==
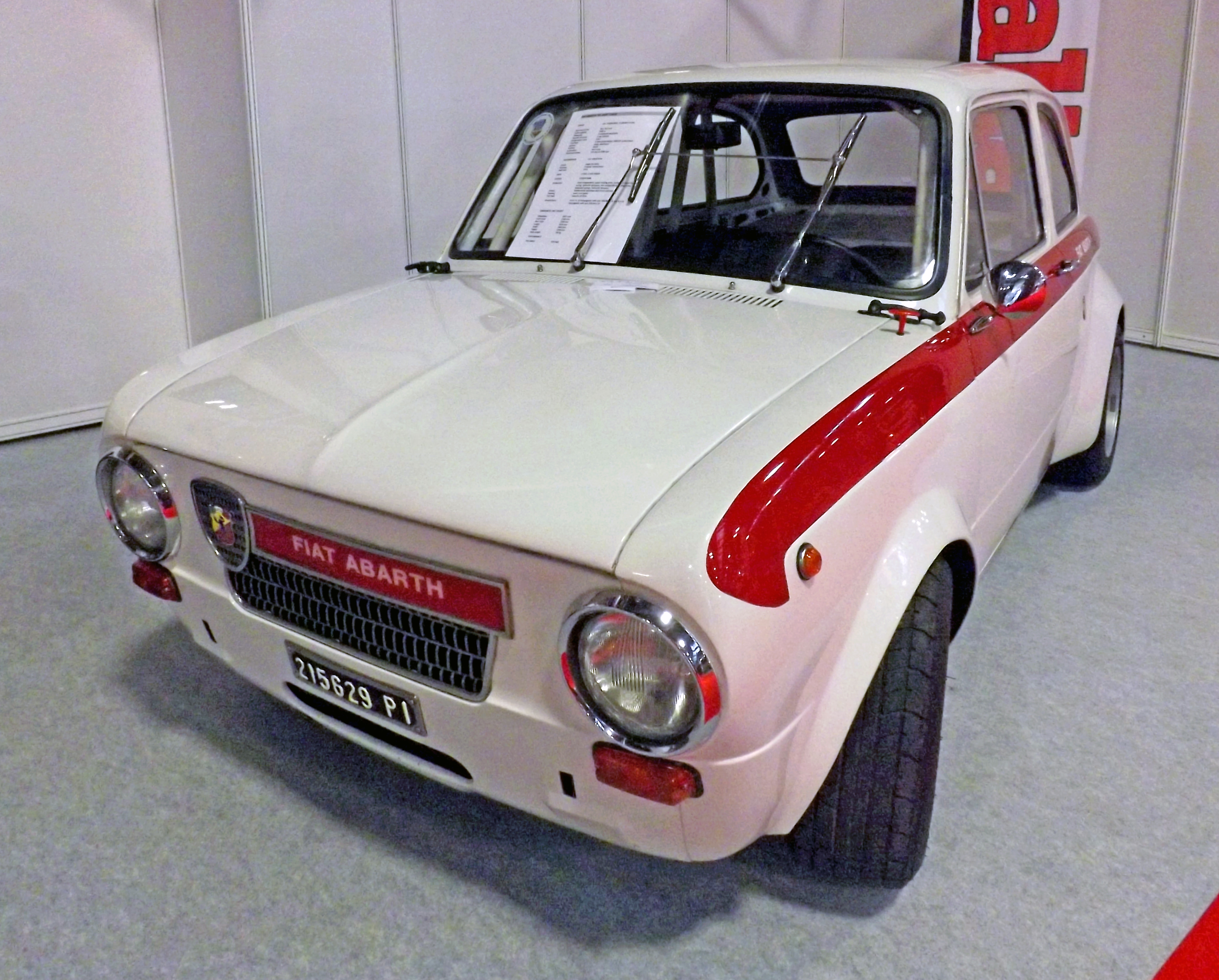
A heavily upgraded Fiat Abarth OT Berlina Corsa (believed to be an OT 1600 replica) with the radiator moved forward and the chromed grille typical of the OTR 1000

The OTR 1000 belongs to the widely ramified Fiat Abarth OT car series, which was produced between 1964 and 1970. Among those OT models with an engine displacement of 1.0 litres and a standard body from Fiat, it was the top model. Its closest relatives were the Abarth OT 1000 (1964 to 1970), particularly the OTS 1000 and OT 1000 SS Corsa coupés, all internally listed as Abarth Tipo 102, as well as the Abarth OTR 850 (Tipo 103).

The car was based on the rear-engine, rear-wheel drive Fiat 850.

The OTR 1000 was created in several versions, some for company purposes, one version also for customers; the most well-known version is the OTR 1000 Coupé with road approval from the years 1965 to 1969. It is equipped with an Abarth engine Sigla 200 with a special cross-flow cylinder head, OHV valve control, and the brand-owned Radiale principle, the Abarth in this model car used for the first time. While the "OT" in the model designation for Omologata Turismo (German homologated touring car) stood, the "R" pointed explicitly to this special cylinder head, and therefore does not stand for "race" or "racing". The OTR has a chrome grille. The original idea was to use it in a series-based touring car category of the sports car world championship, which was restructured for 1965. However, the motorsport homologation was initially delayed by one year due to further development work; after that, the Commission Sportive Internationale (CSI), the approval authority of the Fédération Internationale de l'Automobile (FIA) put the model in a non-series category until 1969 because of the radial cylinder head. Abarth then favoured the OTS 1000 Coupé with a modified standard cylinder head from the Fiat 850 and later for Group 5 the Fiat Abarth 1000 TCR with the Radiale cylinder head and the lighter, more compact base of the Fiat 600 D.

In the series version with road approval, the OTR 1000 has 74 hp DIN (54 kW), and in the racing version without road approval up to 106 hp DIN (78 kW). Exact production figures are not known; individual sources assume that from the only production version in five years possibly only 35 copies were completed in the factory, only eight of them for the US market.

== Overview of the different versions ==
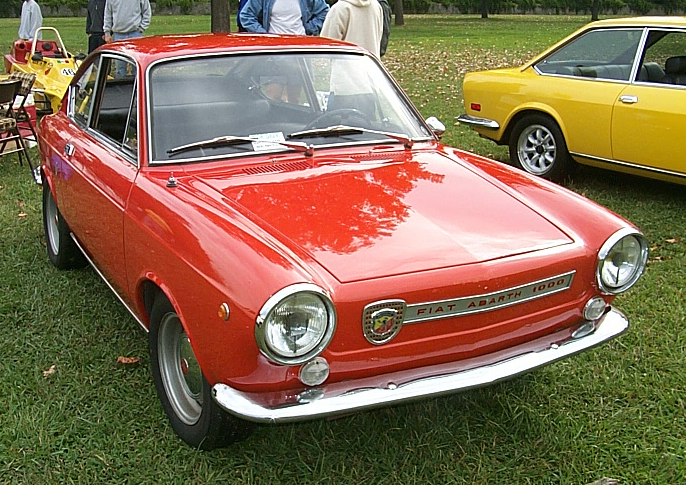
The front of the technically closely related, everyday Fiat Abarth OT 1000 Coupé

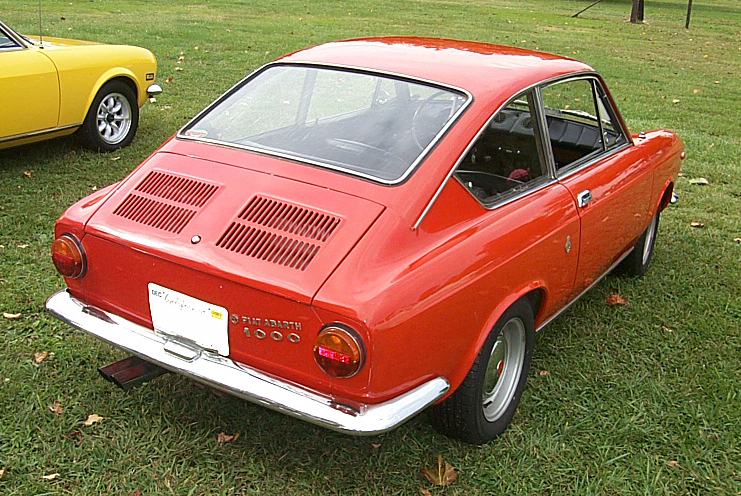
Its rear (with normal water cooler at the back)

The following variants of the Fiat Abarth OTR 1000 were produced ex-works:

- Fiat Abarth OTR 1000 Berlina Corsa (internally Abarth Tipo 100): From 1964, the near-series racing version with an Abarth Sigla 200A engine and the two-door sedan body of the Fiat 850 Berlina was produced in individual pieces for in-house testing without road approval. It was planned for a series-based touring car category from the 1965 World Sportscar Championship, but Abarth later switched to the aerodynamically more favorable coupé version from autumn 1965;
- Fiat Abarth OTR 1000 Berlina (internally Abarth Tipo 100/B ): In 1964, Abarth offered this variant with a two-door sedan body of the Fiat 850 Berlina, the Abarth engine Sigla 200 and in small series or in individual pieces on special request, possibly up to 1966 street legal on; it should support Abarth's efforts to obtain FIA homologation for a near-production category;
- Fiat Abarth OTR 1000 Coupé (internally Abarth Tipo 100/C): This variant, developed in 1964, was offered by Abarth from autumn 1965 to 1969 with the Sigla 200 engine and a 2+2-seater coupé body in limited series. Vehicles through 1968 used the body of the Fiat 850 Coupé; it is unclear whether there were also vehicles with the facelifted body of the Fiat 850 Sport Coupé in 1968/'69;

Bertone Abarth OTR 1000 Berlinetta: In 1965, Abarth and Bertone, who had designed and manufactured the body of the Fiat 850 Spider for Fiat, built a Berlinetta variant for display purposes; it had a redesigned, fixed-mounted coupé roof on a Spider body-in-white with an OTR 1000 Sigla 200 engine and the upgraded interior of the Bertone 850 CL Spider. This body variant eventually went into production in 1968 as the Bertone 850 Racer Berlinetta, but with the production engine from the Fiat 850 Sport Coupé.

Furthermore, individual Fiat Abarth OTR 1000 coupés were converted to Corsa racing versions with accessory kits.

== Development ==
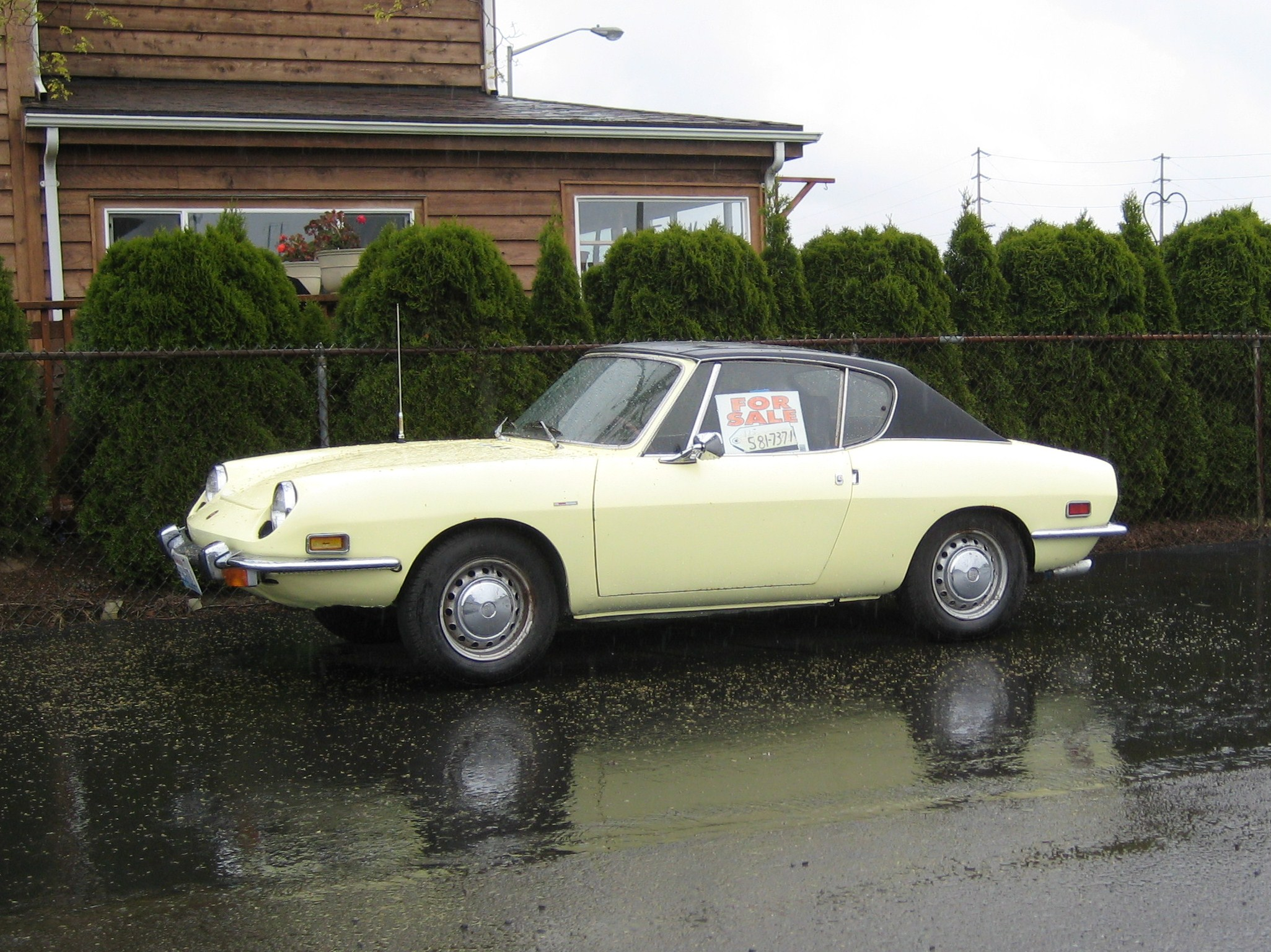
A Bertone 850 Racer Berlinetta with a fixed Spider-based coupé roof (small series from 1968, here a US version from 1971). This body version had its premiere in 1965 as a one-off with an Abarth OTR 1000 engine

Traditionally, Abarth has had close ties with Fiat; Pre-series vehicles, the Fiat 850 Berlina presented in March 1964 and the coupé and spider models presented at the Geneva Motor Show in the spring of the following year, were available early on to develop the diverse Fiat Abarth OT series. Abarth saw the OTR 1000 as a sporty top model in the 1-liter class with the aim of using the Corsa racing version in touring car sport that was close to series production. The road-legal variants, on the other hand, should allow homologation and the Abarth-Promote image further. In 1964, under the guidance of chief engineer Mario Colucci and head of engine development Luciano Fochi, Abarth developed the Abarth Sigla 200 road version engine and the Sigla 200A racing version. With regard to the carburetor equipment, the exhaust manifold, and the entire exhaust system, both engine variants fit into the engine compartment of the sedan as well as the coupé and spider versions.

The OTR 1000 made its public debut in the production version as a road-legal coupé on September 9, 1965, together with the OT 1000 Coupé and the OT 1000 Spider at the International Motor Show in Frankfurt am Main. On November 3, 1965, Abarth exhibited the OTR 1000 Coupé at the Turin Motor Show, while the Abarth OTR 1000 Berlinetta with Spider-based debuted on the Bertone stand; the latter, however, remained a prototype.

Parallel to the OTR 1000, Abarth pursued other sporty concepts based on the Fiat 850, such as the Sigla 202/A engine for the planned OT 1000 SS Coupé from 1964 and the first versions of the Sigla 202/D for the later OTS 1000 Coupé, both with heavily modified engines Fiat cylinder heads. Abarth continued to develop the Radiale cylinder head until 1971, most recently for racing versions of the Autobianchi A112 and Fiat 127. A first modification of the OTR 1000 was the lower displacement OTR 850, which Abarth only offered in 1966 and only with a sedan body; Another further development of the OTR 1000 cylinder head, which was extremely successful in motorsport, was used from 1967 onwards by the Fiat Abarth 1000 TCR Berlina Gruppo 5 (Sigla 210G engine) based on the lighter Fiat 600 D.

== Production ==
The production of the only series version, the OTR 1000 Coupé, began together with the OT 1000 Coupé and the OT 1000 Spider in autumn 1965. Abarth received the starting vehicles for the OTR 1000 Coupés individually from the current Fiat production; he took over their chassis numbers and supplemented them with the prefix "100GC"; subsequent exact counting is therefore not possible.

It is disputed whether the OTR 1000 Coupé, like the parallel models with a coupé body, received a facelift at the beginning of 1968 that followed the transition from the Fiat 850 Coupé to the 850 Sport Coupé. These vehicles from 1968 and '69 would be recognizable by the round additional headlights integrated into the front, a modified radiator grille, a more distinctive rear end with a thin chrome frame, and two taillights each on the right and left as well as bumper guards at the front and rear. This is supported by the fact that the model was officially offered until 1969. However, the individual vehicles known today and photos of test vehicles from that time all show vehicles from the first Fiat 850 Coupé series.

The production of the OTR 1000 ended at the latest in 1969 together with the OTS 1000 Coupé, which had expanded the model range since 1966. From the Fiat Abarth OT series, only the OT 1000 Coupé (now with the more powerful engine of the previous OTS 1000 Coupé ) and the Fiat Abarth OT 1300 Coupé remained for another year; the latter had also expanded the model range from 1966.

The OTR 1000 Coupé was available with red paintwork ("Rosso") and black interior as well as two successive off-white/cream white tones ("camoscio") with red and black interior. How many OTR 1000 coupés were made by Abarth is a matter of debate. The FIA homologation form number 230 shows that on April 30, 1966, the minimum number of fifty identical vehicles was reached. However, several sources assume that Abarth at that time as part of the acceptance - similar to other manufacturers - "tricked" and presented individual vehicles twice; about 35 copies are considered to have actually been built. More cylinder heads in OTR style were later manufactured by the company PBS Engineering; these are used to repair and restore original vehicles and also to build replicas.

== Design ==
The Fiat Abarth OTR 1000 is based on the simpler, more widespread OT 1000, which in turn is based on the rear-engine-made and rear-wheel-drive Fiat 850 of 1964.

=== Drive ===
The OTR 1000 is the only vehicle model to use the Abarth Sigla 200 engine, a 1.0-liter, water-cooled, in-line four-cylinder petrol engine. A special feature is the advanced "Radiale" cylinder head developed and manufactured by Abarth, which had its premiere in this model and was subsequently used in various others. In accordance with the motorsport regulations for touring cars, it basically took over the OHV valve control of the original model, but differs from the Fiat cylinder head in the following points:

The valves (one intake and one exhaust valve per cylinder) are inclined towards one another in a V-shape, i.e. they are no longer arranged parallel to one another. The two valves in each cylinder are arranged transversely to the longitudinal axis of the engine, i.e. they no longer hang in a row along the longitudinal axis. The "Radiale" cylinder head has bi-spherical combustion chambers; they are each formed by two intersecting hemispheres, the smaller of which is arranged around the inlet valve and the larger one around the outlet valve. A bore and stroke of 65.0 and 74.0 mm (2.56 and 2.91 in) resulted in a displacement of 982 cc (59.9 cu in). The manufacturer put the performance of the production model at 74 hp DIN (54 kW) at 6500 rpm. The mixture preparation takes place via two Solex double carburetors of the type C32PHH. Abarth specified the top speed as "over 170 kilometers per hour" and fuel consumption as 9 liters per hundred kilometers.

It is not entirely clear which manual transmission the vehicles were equipped with. Some sources mention only a conventional four-speed gearbox, apparently the standard transmission of the Fiat 850. According to individual sources, all vehicles known today have this transmission. The factory data sheet and the FIA homologation sheet, on the other hand, name a five-speed gearbox from Abarth ex-works; According to some sources, this should have been available at least as an extra that was subject to a surcharge. This may have been the Abarth Tipo 102 gearbox. Depending on the source, an Abarth six-speed gearbox is said to have been available as an alternative for a surcharge. In this case, it would have been an Abarth Tipo 132 gearbox.

=== Undercarriage ===
The OTR 1000 uses the chassis of the Fiat 850 with independent suspension. Like all versions of the Fiat Abarth OT line of passenger cars, it has been modified for a higher power. Ex works, the OTR 1000 had - similar to the other coupés of the OT series - 13-inch high Abarth steel rims with a chrome-plated decorative cover including the Abarth logo to cover the hub and wheel bolts. 13-inch light-alloy wheels from several manufacturers were available ex works for a surcharge. The standard tires had the format 145 × 13 (Michelin and Pirelli) and 155×13 (Kléber Colombes) respectively.

As with all OT 1000 versions, the front wheels are slowed down by disc brakes. According to the factory data sheet, the OTR 1000 was supposed to have been equipped with disc brakes on the rear wheels as standard, which differed from the weaker models in this respect; sometimes preserved vehicles only have rear drum brakes.

The wheelbase of 2027 millimeters and the track width of 1150 millimeters at the front and 1160 millimeters at the rear correspond to the Fiat 850 and the conventional Fiat Abarth OT passenger cars. As part of the FIA homologation, a widening of the track to 1230 millimeters at the front and 1248 millimeters at the rear was permitted.

=== Body ===
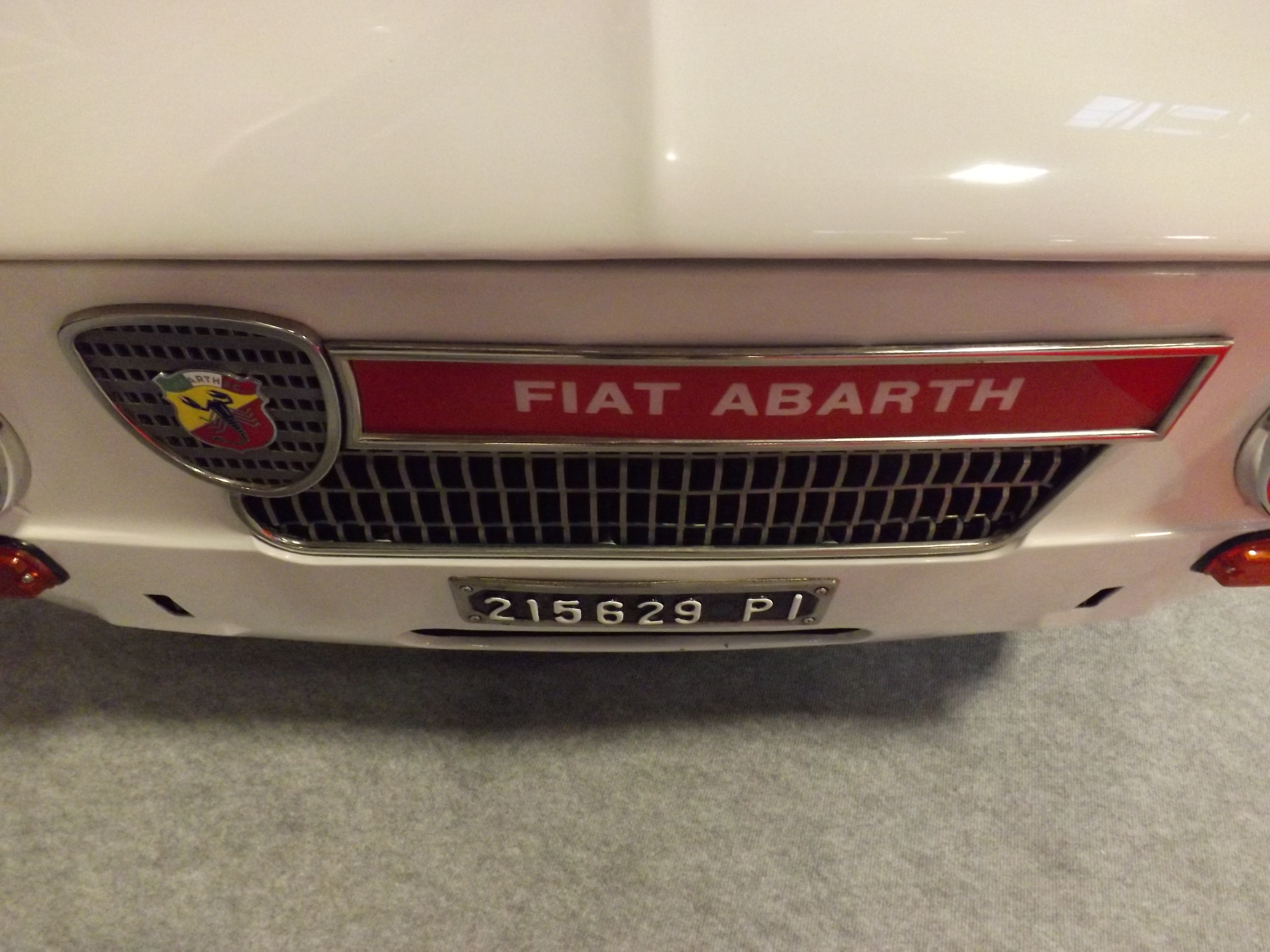
The chrome-plated radiator grille for the water cooler that was moved forward, as was also characteristic of the Fiat Abarth OTR 1000 (here the Berlina Corsa version with a different displacement)

The OTR 1000 uses the stock bodies of the Fiat 850. Externally, it differs from this in many smaller details; Compared to other variants of the Fiat Abarth OT passenger car series, the external differences are sometimes small.

On the rear panel, between the space for the rear license plate and the right rear light unit, the addition "OTR" is located below the chrome-plated "Fiat Abarth" and "1000" lettering; it replaces the chrome "OT" logo in front of the "Fiat Abarth" lettering.

The OTR 1000 Coupé shares other external features with the OTS 1000 Coupé produced from 1966 to 1969: At the front of the vehicle, a slightly trapezoidal radiator grille, which is narrower at the bottom, covers the special opening through which the water cooler, which is positioned at the front, is supplied with cooling air. Above the grille is a narrow chrome strip with the inscription "Fiat Abarth 1000". On the coupes, the large Abarth logo is mounted centrally on the grille, on the few OTR-saloons (seen from the front) asymmetrically on the top left. On the front panel of the street-legal versions, two chrome-plated attachment points for the oil cooler, which is concealed behind the panel, can be seen below the bumper; only the racing versions have a separate opening for this cooler.

Other external features that distinguish the Fiat Abarth OTR 1000 from the Fiat 850 can also be found on other models in the OT series, such as the "Abarth" logos on the body flanks and the wheel covers.

== Use in motorsports ==
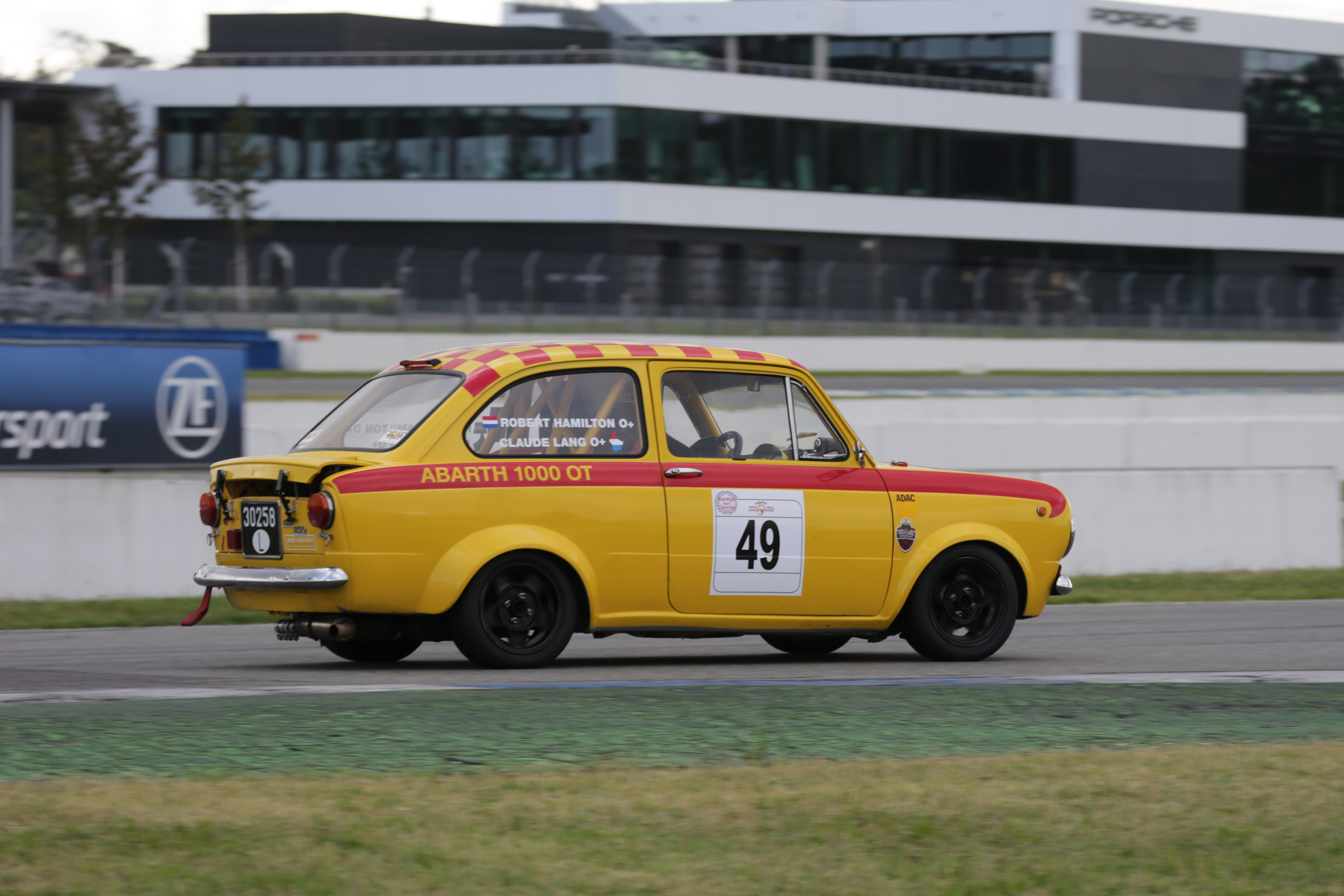
The racing version Abarth 1000 OT (Omologato Turismo)

On the occasion of the public presentation of the OTR coupé in the fall of 1965, Carlo Abarth already mentioned that a racing version with 95 hp DIN (70 kW) at the time was being tested. However, the development proved to be time-consuming and expensive. On 30 April 1966, the FIA granted homologation for the Fiat Abarth OTR 1000 Coupé as a Group 4 touring car. However, Abarth's hope of getting a classification for Group 3, which is closer to the series, was not fulfilled; it was reserved for the Fiat Abarth OTS 1000 Coupé with a standard cylinder head. Because Abarth Group 4 seemed unattractive, it remained in 1966 and 1967 with a few works events, mostly mountain races, rarely circuit races. A factory conversion kit was available from 1968, which enabled races in the stronger, more attractive Group 5. It was only after Abarth stopped selling the OTR 1000 in 1969 that it was classified in FIA Group 2/'70 from the 1970 season, which gave private drivers better opportunities.

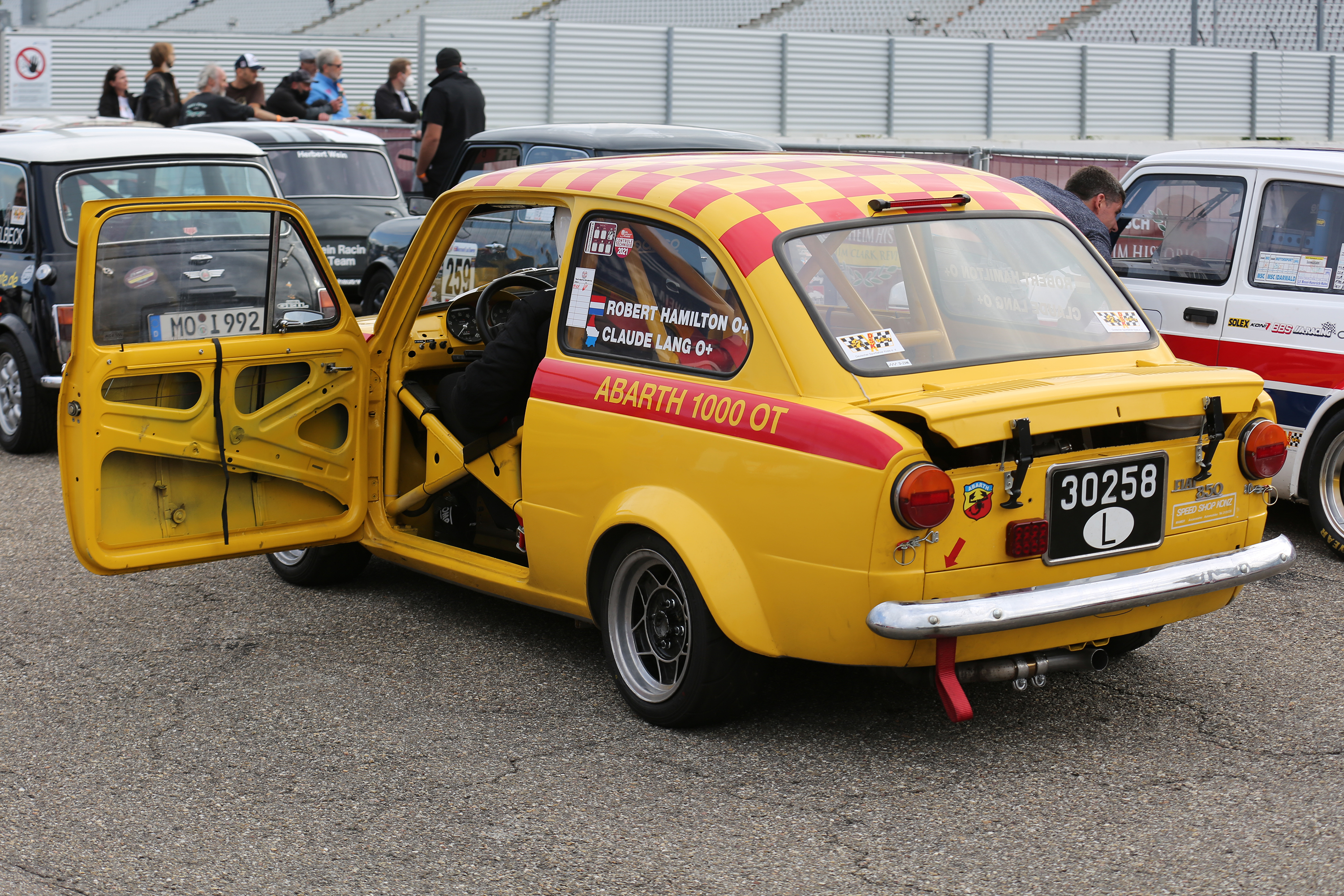
Roll cage and weight reduction (by removing unnecessary parts)

Accordingly, the cheaper, lower-rated models OTS 1000 Coupé and its racing variant OT 1000 SS Corsa proved to be significantly more popular than the OTR 1000 Coupé; in the demanding Group 5, on the other hand, customers preferred the Fiat Abarth 1000 TCR because of a weight advantage of around 40 kilograms.

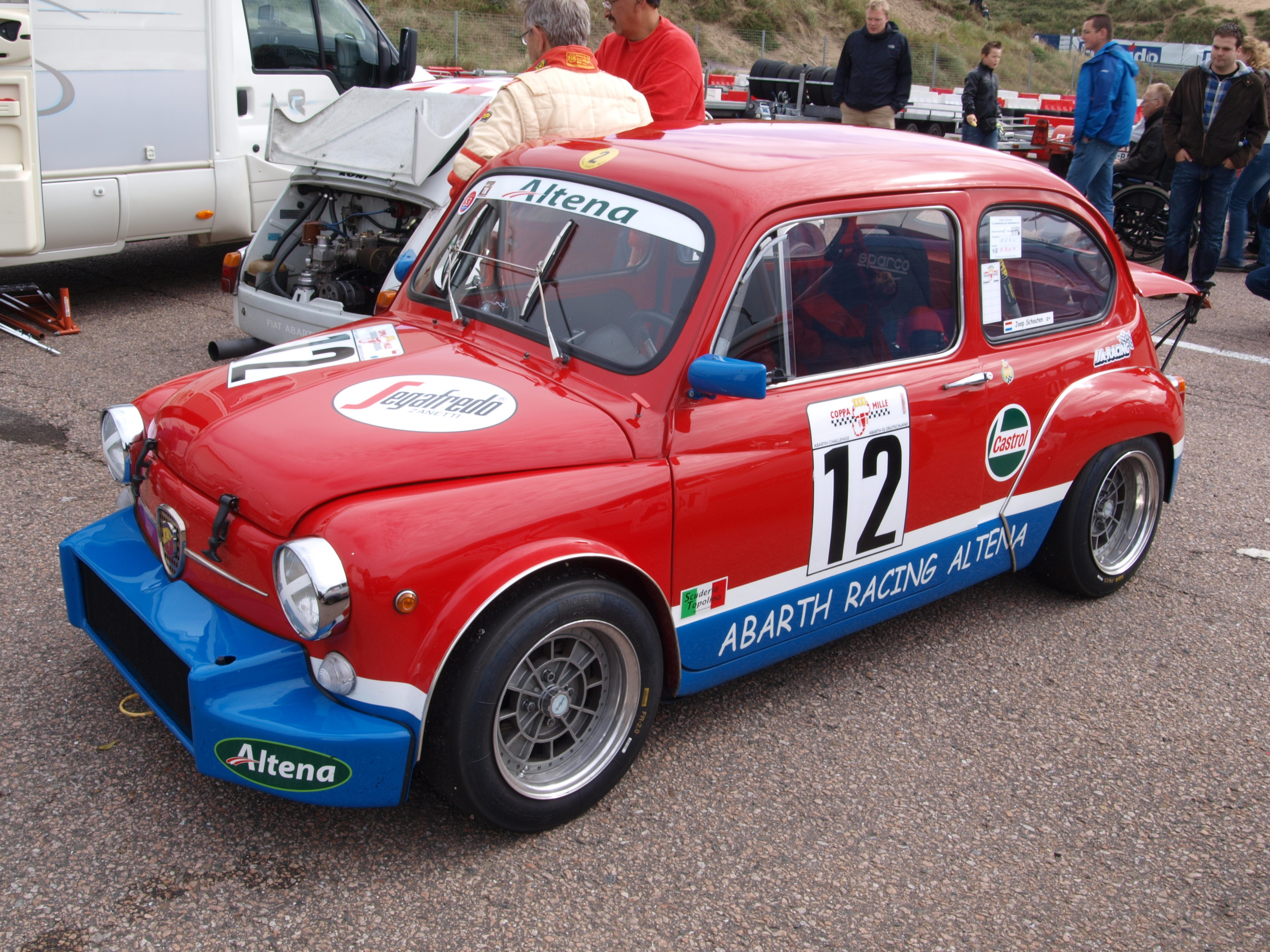
The OTR 1000 Coupé 's in-house competition in Group 5 Touring Cars: the Fiat Abarth 1000 TCR

Abarth's homologation efforts in the United States were similarly unsuccessful: the Sports Car Club of America (SCCA) denied the OTR 1000 approval as a near-series vehicle because of its radial cylinder head by demanding its own, unattainable homologation with 500 units; this left only participation in smaller, subordinate racing events or in the category of non-series "specials" in the US.

== Contemporary car prices ==
At the beginning of 1966, the Fiat Abarth OTR 1000 Coupé cost 11,875 Deutschmarks in West Germany. The Fiat 850 Coupé, on which it was based, was listed at 5,880 German marks and the Abarth OT 1000 Coupé base model at 9,975, while the Fiat Abarth 1000 Bialbero coupé with a 1.0-liter DOHC engine and alloy bodywork from Sibona-Basano cost 22,800 marks.

For the price of a new OTR 1000 Coupé, one could instead have purchased an Alfa Romeo Giulia 1600 Spider Veloce, a BMW 2000 ti, a Mercedes-Benz 230, or two VW 1300 L ("Beetle") with money to spare.

On the Italian home market, the OTR 1000 Coupé initially cost 1,410,000 and later 1,535,000 lire, while the simpler OT 1000 Coupé was available for 1,160,000 and a Fiat 850 Berlina for 798,000 lire. Popular add-ons included light-alloy wheels from Amadori or Campagnolo for 23,500 lire and steering wheels with wooden rim or leather covering for between 17,000 and 22,000 lire.

== Today ==
Of the few original OTR 1000, only a few vehicles have survived to this day. Because of their inconspicuous appearance, they received little attention even among vehicle collectors for a long time. Today they are sought-after collector's items among lovers of the Abarth brand. On the 16th/17th of January, 2014, auction house RM/Sotheby's in Phoenix, Arizona auctioned a 1967 Fiat Abarth OTR 1000 Coupe (Corsa) for US$79,750.

On January 15, 2015, a similar model was listed for sale through Bonham's auction house in Scottsdale, Arizona, with an estimate of between $70,000 and $90,000.
