= Abarth 3000 SP =

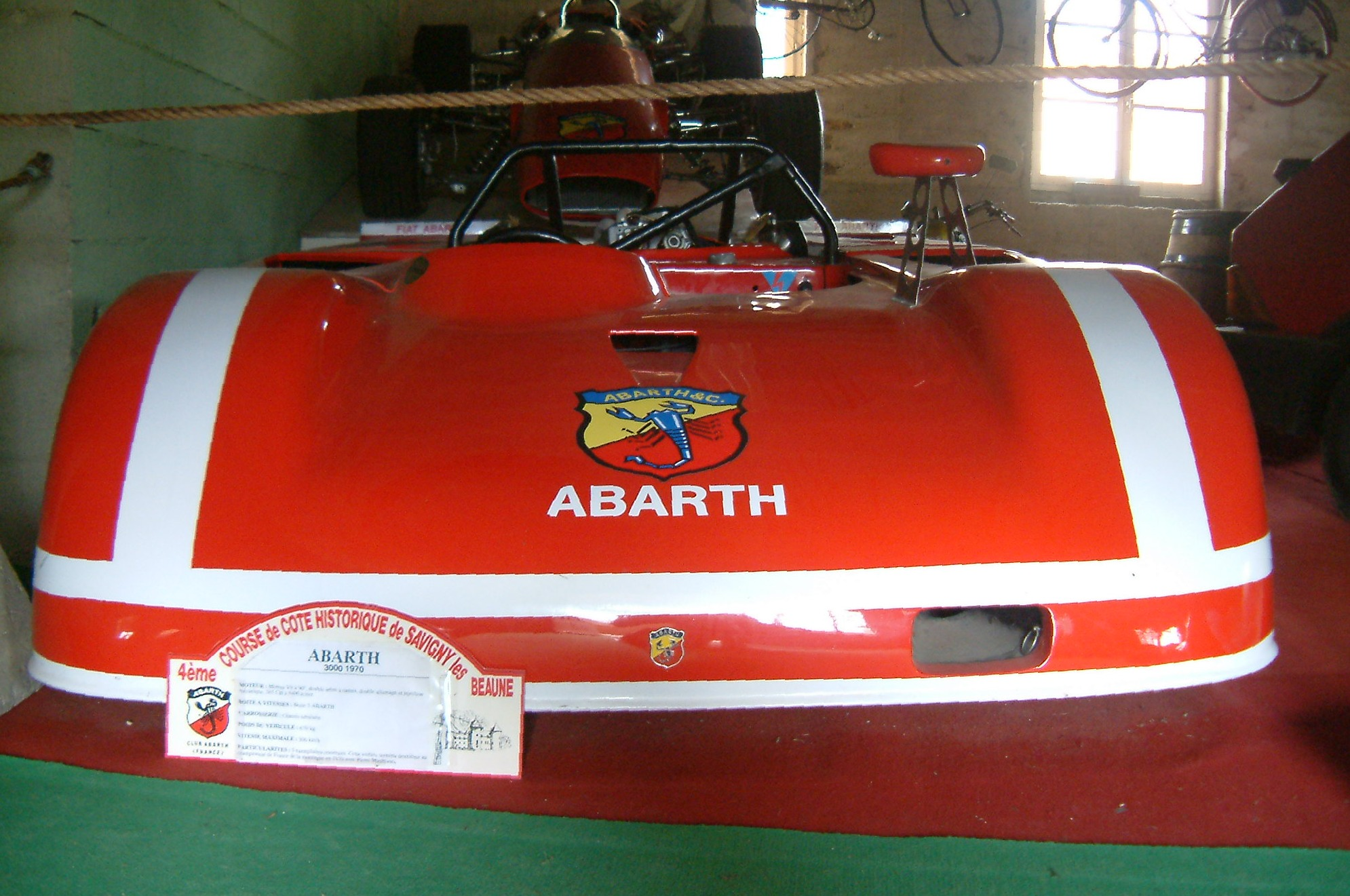

Overview
- Manufacturer: Abarth
- Production: 1968–1971
- Designer: Mario Colucci

Body and chassis
- Class: Group 6 prototype sports car
- Layout: RMR

Powertrain
- Engine: 2968 cc (3.0 L (180 cu in)) V-8
- Transmission: 5-speed manual

Dimensions
- Wheelbase: 2,100–2,260 mm (82.7–89.0 in)
- Length: 3,500 mm (137.8 in)
- Width: 1,880 mm (74.0 in)
- Height: 840 mm (33.1 in)
- Curb weight: 615–640 kg (1,356–1,411 lb)

The Abarth 3000 Sport Prototipo was a sports car prototype made by Abarth & C. in Turin, Italy. It was the first Abarth with an engine with a capacity of more than 2-liters, after an already finished 6-liter twelve-cylinder from 1967 had become useless before it could be used due to a change in the regulations. The displacement for sports car prototypes was limited to 3 liters and for sports cars to 5 liters.

== History and technology ==
The first Abarth model built according to the new regulations was the SE 013, a Spider or open two-seater, in 1968. The basis for the engine was a 2-liter V8 presented in 1966, the cylinders of which had been bored out to 3-liter displacement. This eight-cylinder with two valves per cylinder and four Weber twin carburetors developed 350 hp (257 kW) at 8200 revolutions per minute. The engine is installed behind the driver in the middle of the vehicle in front of a five-speed gearbox. The gear lever to the right of the driver is guided in a backdrop.

=== First race in 1968 ===
This car was registered for the 1968 24 Hours of Le Mans but withdrawn after the race was moved from the original date in June to late autumn due to possible strikes caused by student unrest. This could be due to technical difficulties, which had probably emerged in the meantime, or the concern that the engine power would not be sufficient, even though it corresponded to that of the Porsche 908 at least according to the factory specifications. The first use of the Abarth 3000 SP was in October 1968 at the airfield races “Preis von Wien” in Aspern and “Preis von Tirol” in Innsbruck. Peter Schetty won both races with little serious competition from Arturo Merzario, who was also in an Abarth.

=== 1969 season with revised bodies ===
It wasn't until the second half of the 1969 season that races started again, but not championship races. In the 500 km race in Imola, Abarth fielded two 3000s with different bodies with the designations SE 015 and SE 016. Both cars were fast in practice and only inferior to Jackie Ickx's Mirage, but Johannes Ortner was unable to race after a defect and Merzario was eliminated after 16 laps. In October 1969, Merzario and Ortner took second and third place overall in the “Preis von Tirol”, and Merzario won the racing sports car class with a displacement of more than two liters. Toine Hezemans won the sparse “International AvD Circuit Race” in Zolder on Abarth 3000 SP, Ortner came third.

=== Failure at the 1970 Targa Florio ===
In May 1970, Abarth competed with the 3-liter car for the first time in a race of the brand world championship, the Targa Florio. However, Mario Casoni had an accident during training, so only one car entered the race, and the Merzario / Ortner team retired after just two laps with gearbox damage.

=== Won the European Hill Climb Championship in 1971 ===
The Abarth 3000 was further developed in 1971. The tubular frame became narrower, and the body smoother. Most of the changes concerned the engine. It received two camshafts per cylinder bank, Lucas fuel injection instead of the carburetor, and the electronic ignition system "Dinoplex". This increased the output to 365 hp (268 kW) at 8400 revolutions per minute. However, this puts Abarth below most competing vehicles in terms of engine performance.

Two body variants were planned, the type SE 020 with a flat windshield and the type SE 022. The participation in the brand world championship originally planned with the SE 020 was canceled, while Ortner contested the European mountain championship with the SE 022 . He won the races in Dobratsch, Rossfeld, and Cesana-Sestriere; He finished second on Mont Ventoux and Trento Bondone and third in Ollon-Villars. With these successes, he became the European mountain champion for the second time.

After Carlo Abarth had sold production facilities and names to Fiat at the end of the season, the Abarth 3000 Sp was no longer developed. Private drivers occasionally drove it in both mountain and circuit races.

=== Technical specifications (1971) ===
- Engine: Four-stroke V8, mid-engine
- Displacement: 2968 cc
- Bore/Stroke: 88 mm/61 mm
- Power: 350–365 hp (261–272 kW)
- Compression ratio: 12.0:1
- Valve control: 2 OHC per cylinder bank
- Fuel mixture preparation: Lucas-Benzineinspritzung
- Transmission: 5-speed manual
- Body and chassis: Fiberglass reinforced and tubular frame
- Track width (front/rear): 1405 mm/1470 mm
- Wheelbase: 2100 mm
- Tire size (front/rear): 4.50 / 11.60 × 13 and 5.50 / 15.00 × 13
- Dimensions (L x W x H): 3500 mm x 1880 mm x 840 mm
- Curb weight: 615 kg (1,356 lb)
