= Abarth =

Italian car manufacturer

Abarth & C. S.p.A.
- Type: Subsidiary
- Industry: Automotive
- Founded: 31 March 1949; 77 years ago
- Founder: Carlo Abarth
- Headquarters: Turin, Italy; 45.0608762°N 7.591101°E
- Area served: Europe; Africa; Asia; Oceania
- Key people: Olivier François (CEO); Alfredo Altavilla (COO)
- Parent: Stellantis Europe
- Website: abarth.com

Abarth & C. S.p.A. (Italian: [ˈaːbart]) is an Italian racing- and road-car maker and performance division founded by Italo-Austrian Carlo Abarth in 1949. Abarth & C. S.p.A. is owned by Stellantis through its Italian subsidiary. Abarth's logo is a shield with a stylized scorpion on a yellow and red background, a short, wide Italian flag in the middle, and "Abarth" text on a black background.

== History ==
=== 1949: Abarth & C. ===
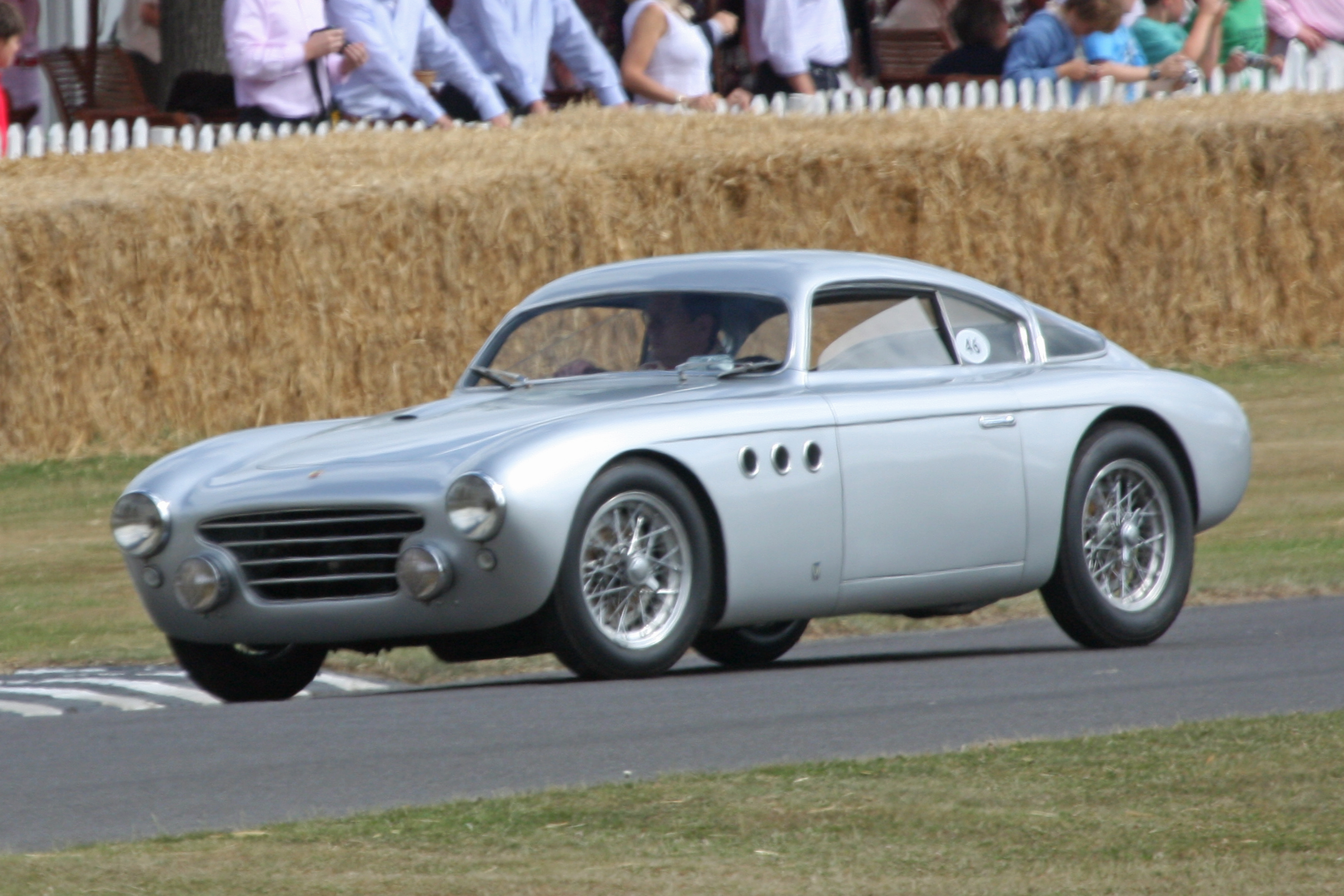
A 1950 205A, one of the first Abarth cars

Carlo Abarth was sporting director of the Cisitalia racing team starting in 1947. The following year, the manufacturer folded, and founder Piero Dusio flew to Argentina.

Abarth, funded by Armando Scagliarini, (Note: Father of Cisitalia racing driver Guido Scagliarini.) took over Cisitalia's assets and on 31 March 1949, Abarth & C. was founded in Bologna. Carlo's astrological sign, Scorpio, was chosen as the company logo.

From the Cisitalia liquidation, Abarth obtained five 204 sports cars (two complete Spiders and three unfinished), a D46 single-seater, and various spares. The Cisitalia 204s were immediately rechristened Abarth Cisitalia 204A. Abarth proceeded to build and race a series of sports cars developed from these last Cisitalia cars. In addition to Guido Scagliarini, the "Squadra Abarth" racing team lined up celebrated drivers, including Tazio Nuvolari, Franco Cortese, and Piero Taruffi. Notably, Tazio Nuvolari made his last appearance in racing at the wheel of an Abarth 204A, winning its class in the Palermo–Monte Pellegrino hillclimb on 10 April 1950. Alongside racing, the company's main activity was producing and selling accessories and performance parts for Fiat, Lancia, Cisitalia, and Simca cars, like inlet manifolds and silencers.

On 9 April 1951, the company's headquarters were moved to Turin; Abarth began his well-known association with Fiat in 1952, when the company built the Abarth 1500 Biposto on Fiat mechanicals.

In 1957, Abarth entered a deal with Fiat whereby they were paid direct fees for successful competition finishes. Abarth accordingly went on to enter their cars in hillclimbing and sports-car racing events across the world, mainly in classes from 850 to 2000 cc, competing with Porsche 904 and Ferrari Dino in the higher echelons. Since they were paid based on the number of results, Abarth entered their cars in every conceivable class and in countries across the entire world. Hans Herrmann was a factory driver from 1962 until 1965, winning the 500 km Nürburgring in 1963 with Teddy Pilette.

Abarth promised Johann Abt that he could race a factory car for free if he won all the races he entered. Abt almost succeeded; of the 30 races he entered, Abt won 29 and finished second once. Abt later founded Abt Sportsline.

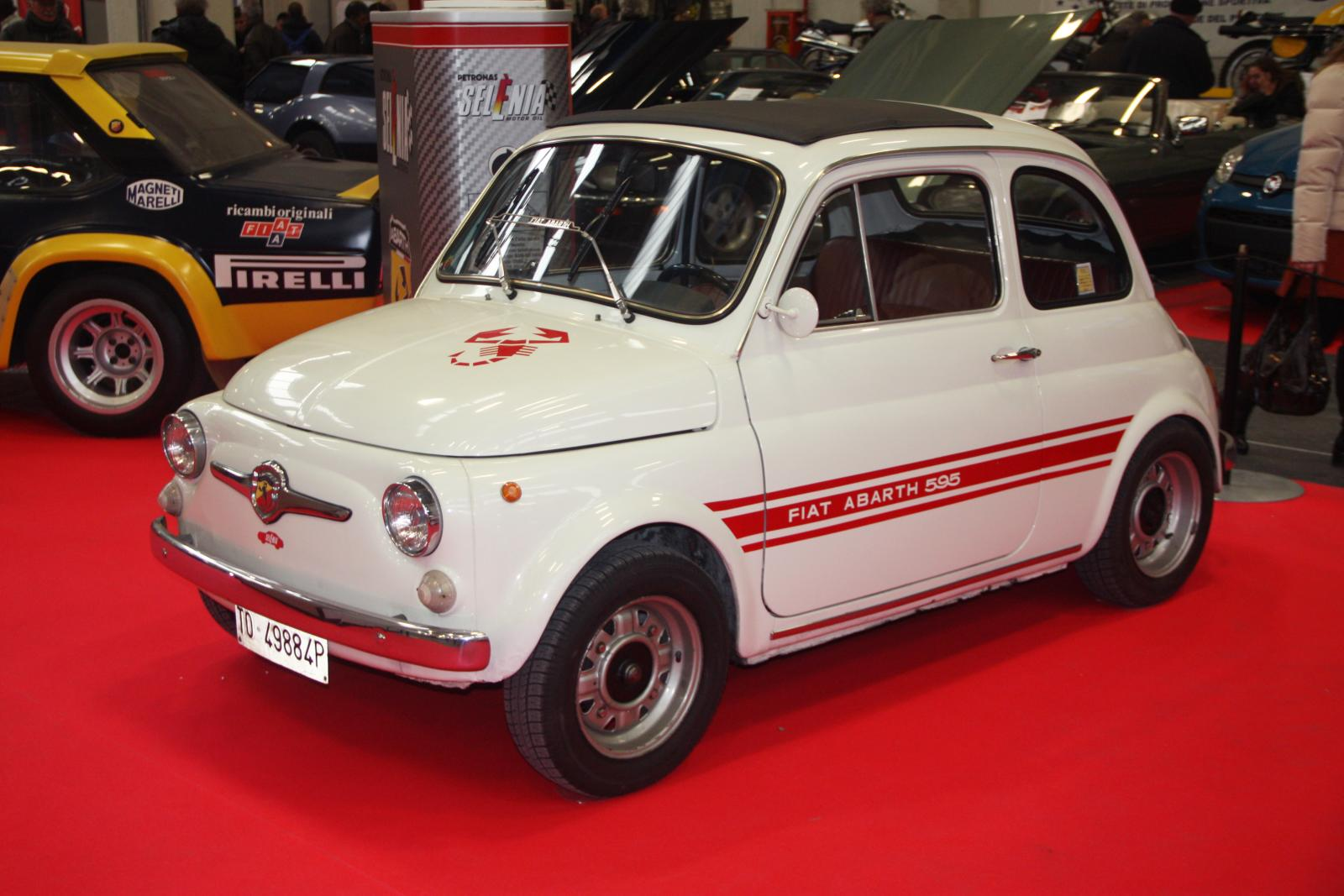
Abarth 595, derived from the Fiat 500

Abarth produced high-performance exhaust pipes, diversifying into tuning kits for road vehicles, mainly for Fiat. A racing exhaust was produced for the 1950s Lambretta models "D" and "LD". Original Abarth LD exhausts are now valuable collector's items. Reproductions are available, which carry the Abarth name; how Fiat feels about this is not known. Lambretta even held several 125 cc motorcycle land speed records during the 1950s due partly to the exhaust that Abarth developed for them.

In 1958, Abarth developed the Abarth Alfa Romeo 1000 in collaboration with the Milanese manufacturer. They sent an engineer, Mario Colucci, to oversee the process. Abarth was impressed with his skill, and while the car remained a one-off, Colucci was given the position of Abarth's Technical Director in 1960. Colucci's first design was a mid-engined, tubular framed roadster using the 750 engine called the Abarth Spider Sport. This car had an unfortunate gestation period and never attained much success in competition, while Abarth himself favored the rear-engine layout and kept offering both types. The Spider Sport series was also built with 700 and 1000 cc displacements, while a few late examples were fitted with 1300 cc engines of Simca origins. Colucci's next design, the Group 4 1000 SP, was much more successful and spawned a range of mid-engined, tubular-framed, fibreglass-bodied sports prototypes.

Abarth also helped build sports or racing cars with Porsche and Simca.

=== 1971: Fiat takeover ===
Carlo sold Abarth to Fiat on 31 July 1971. The acquisition was not made public until 15 October. As Fiat was not interested in the Reparto Corse racing operations, these were taken over by Enzo Osella. Osella obtained cars, spares, technicians, and drivers (amongst them Arturo Merzario), and continued the racing activity, founding the Osella racing team. Thus ended for Abarth the days of sport prototype and hillclimb racing.

Under Fiat ownership, Abarth became the Fiat Group's racing department, managed by engine designer Aurelio Lampredi. Abarth prepared Fiat's rally cars, including the Fiat 124 Abarth Rally and 131 Abarth. In December 1977, in advance of the 1978 racing season, the beforehand competing Abarth and Squadra Corse Lancia factory racing operations were merged by Fiat into a single entity named EASA (Ente per l'Attività Sportiva Automobilistica, Organization for Car Sports Racing Activities). Cesare Fiorio (previously in charge of the Lancia rally team) was appointed director, while Daniele Audetto was sporting director; the EASA headquarters were set up in Abarth's Corso Marche (Turin) offices. The combined racing department developed the Lancia Beta Montecarlo Turbo Group 5 racing car which won the 1980 World Championship for Makes and the 1981 World Endurance Championship of Makes. It also created the Lancia Rally 037 Group B rally car, which won for Lancia the 1983 World Manufacturers' Championship).

On 1 October 1981, Abarth & C. ceased to exist, and was replaced by Fiat Auto Gestione Sportiva, a division of the parent company specialised in the management of racing programmes that would remain in operation through to the end of 1999, when it changed to Fiat Auto Corse S.p.A.

Some commercial models built by Fiat or its subsidiaries Lancia and Autobianchi were co-branded Abarth, including the Autobianchi A112 Abarth, a lightweight and inexpensive "boy racer". The A112 Abarth was introduced with a 58 hp engine, soon followed by a 70 hp one, and a specific "A112 Abarth trophy" was run from 1977 to 1984.

In the 1980s, Abarth name was mainly used to mark performance cars, such as the Fiat Ritmo Abarth 125/130 TC.

In 2000s, Fiat used the Abarth brand to designate a trim/model level, as in the Fiat Stilo Abarth.

=== 2007: Rebirth of Abarth & C. S.p.A. ===
On 1 February 2007, Abarth was re-established as an independent unit with the launch of the current company, Abarth & C. S.p.A., controlled 100% by Fiat Group Automobiles S.p.A., the subsidiary of Fiat S.p.A. dealing with the production and selling of passenger cars and light commercial vehicles.

The first models launched were the Abarth Grande Punto and the Abarth Grande Punto S2000. The brand is based in the Officine 83, part of the old Mirafiori engineering plant. The CEO as of 2022 is Olivier François.

In 2015, Abarth's parent company was renamed FCA Italy S.p.A., reflecting the incorporation of Fiat S.p.A. into Fiat Chrysler Automobiles that took place in the previous months.

=== Yamaha XSR900 Abarth ===
In 2017, Abarth collaborated with Yamaha to produce a limited-edition motorcycle, the "Sport Heritage café racer special". Named the XSR900 Abarth it was based on the 847 cc inline-triple standard neo-retro Yamaha XSR900.

=== List of CEOs ===
Current Olivier François (since 2011)

=== Previous CEOs ===
- Carlo Abarth (1949–1971)
- Harald Wester (2010–2011)

== Production ==
=== Current models ===
New 500e	Pulse	Fastback	600e
Class: City car (A); Body style: 3-door hatchback 3-door cabriolet Production: 2026–present	Class: Subcompact crossover (B); Body style: 5-door hatchback Production: 2025–present	Class: Subcompact crossover SUV (B); Body style: 5-door coupe SUV; Production: 2025–present	Class: Subcompact crossover SUV (B); Body style: 5-door SUV; Production: 2026–to comm

=== Past models ===
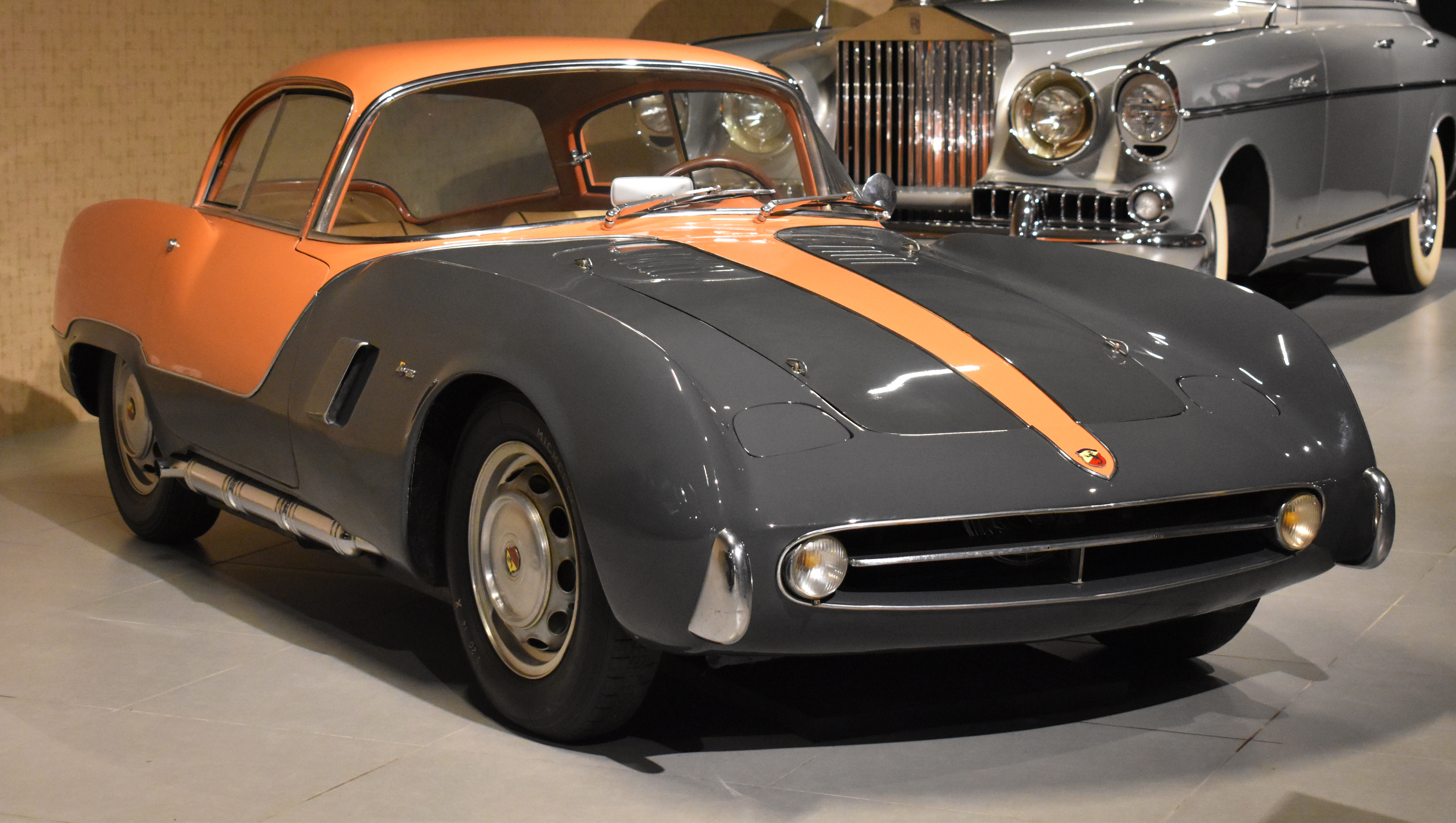
1955 Abarth 209A Boano Coupé

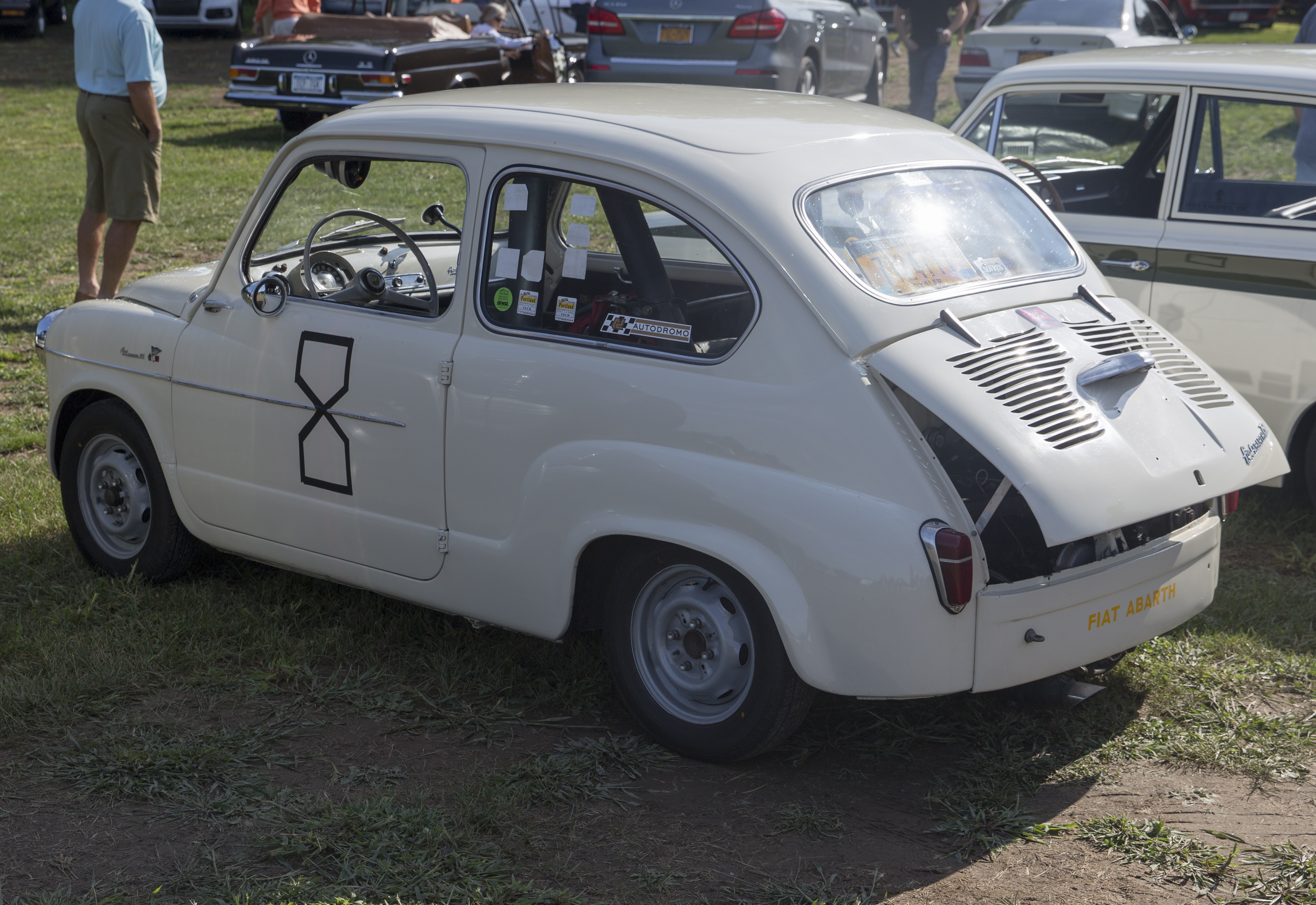
1959 Fiat-Abarth 750

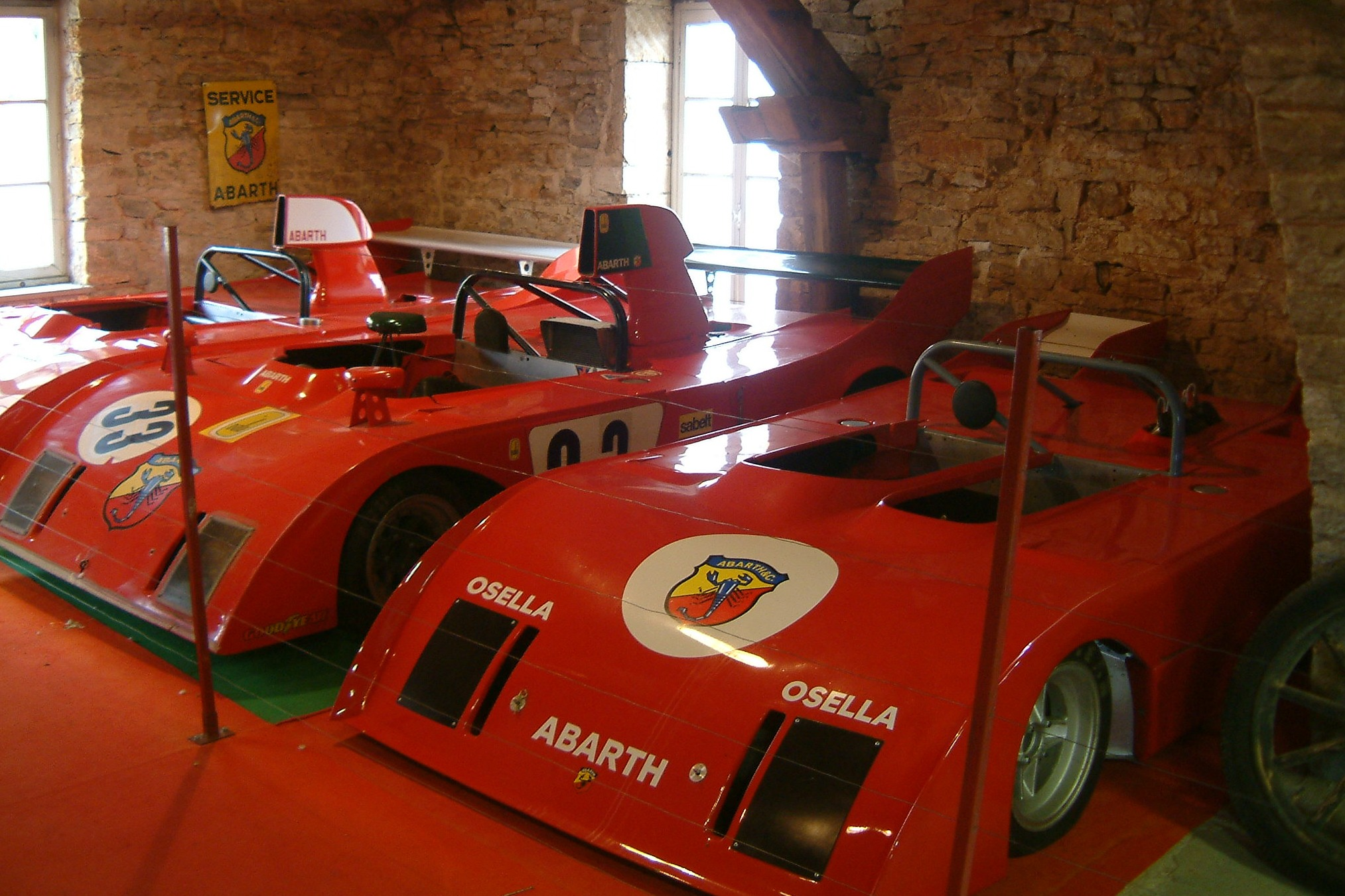
Abarth race cars (1973 Osella 2000 Sport PA1)

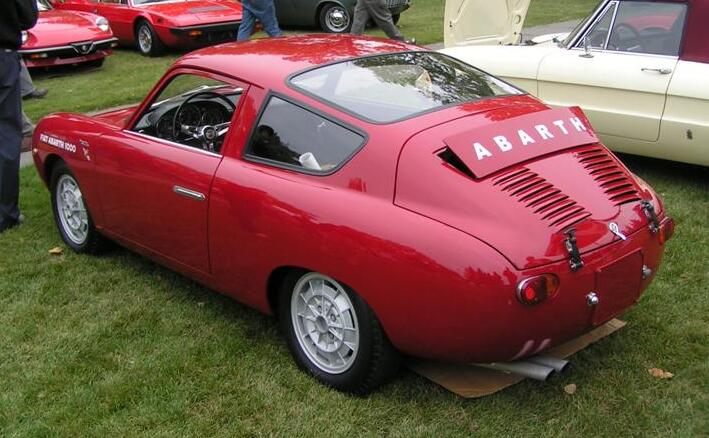
Fiat Abarth 1000 Zagato Bialbero

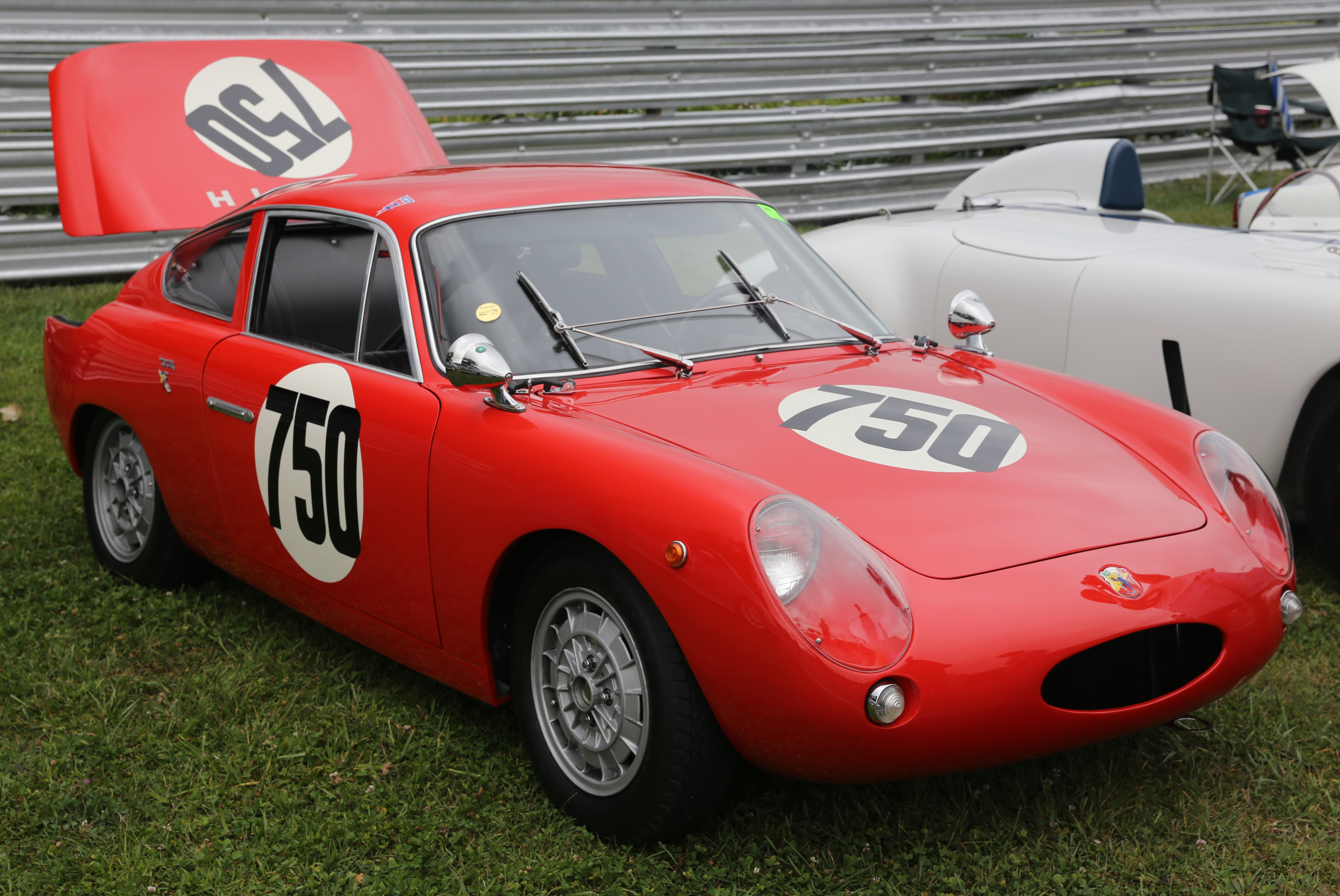
1963 Abarth Monomille, rebodied Fiat 600 chassis

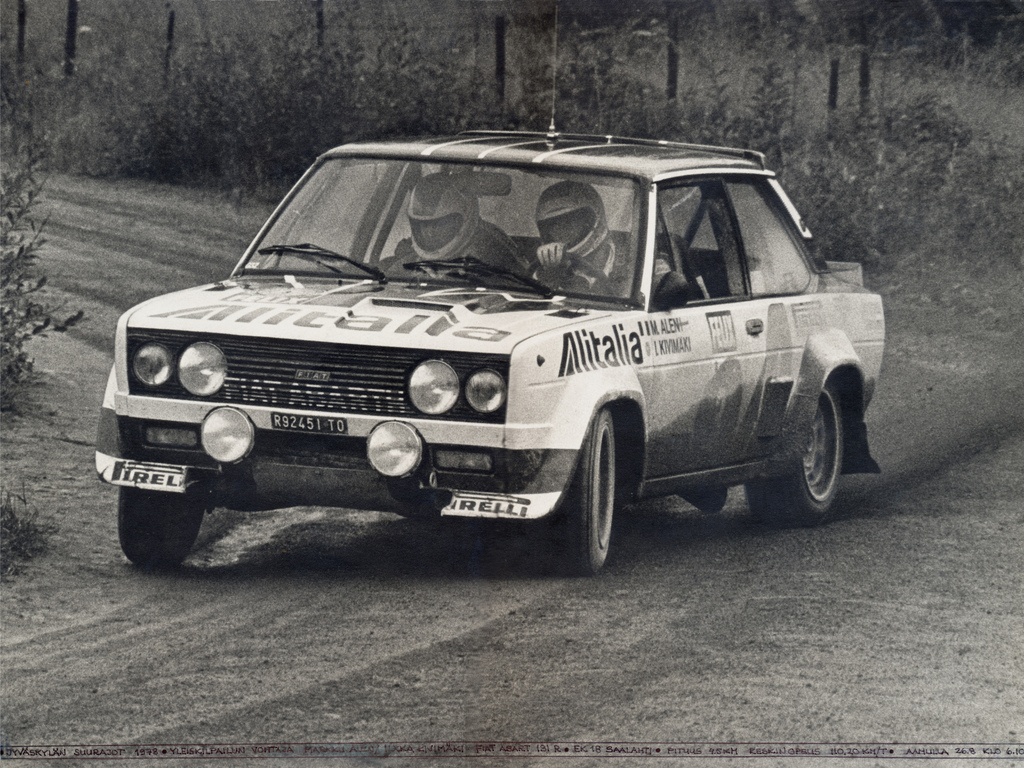
Fiat 131 Abarth driven by Markku Alén at the 1978 1000 Lakes Rally

==== Standalone models (original bodywork) ====
- Abarth 204A
- Abarth 205A Berlinetta
- Abarth 207A Spyder Corsa Boano
- Abarth 208A Spyder Boano
- Abarth 209A Coupé Boano
- Abarth 210A Spyder Boano
- Abarth 215A Coupé Bertone
- Abarth 216A Spyder Bertone
- Fiat Abarth 1000 SP
- Abarth 1100 Scorpione Spider (Boano)
- Abarth 1500 Biposto
- Abarth 3000 Prototipo
- Fiat-Abarth 750
- Fiat-Abarth 750 Zagato
- Fiat-Abarth 750 Spider Allemano
- Fiat-Abarth 1000 OTR Berlinetta Bertone
- Abarth OT 1300, OT 2000 ("Periscopio" sports prototypes)
- Abarth 1000 Zagato/Bialbero
- Abarth Monomille

==== Fiat variant models ====
- Fiat-Abarth 500
- Fiat-Abarth 595 SS
- Fiat-Abarth 695 SS
- Fiat-Abarth 850 TC
- Fiat-Abarth 1000 TC (Fiat 600 based)
- Fiat Abarth 1000 TCR Berlina
- Fiat-Abarth OT1000
- Fiat Abarth OTR 1000
- Fiat-Abarth OT1600
- Fiat-Abarth OT 2000 Competition Coupé
- Fiat-Abarth 2200
- Fiat-Abarth 2400
- Fiat Ritmo 125/130 TC Abarth
- Fiat Abarth 124 Rally
- Fiat 131 Abarth Rally

==== Other variant models ====
- Abarth Simca 1300 GT
- Abarth Simca 2000 – coupé
- Alfa Romeo Abarth 2000 Coupe
- Porsche 356 B Carrera GTL Abarth
- Abarth Grand Prix/Scorpione
- Lancia Rally 037
- Autobianchi A112 Abarth

=== Cars not produced by Abarth but with Abarth badges ===
- Fiat Bravo GT/HGT (Abarth)
- Fiat Stilo 2.4 Abarth
- Fiat Punto HGT (Abarth)
- Fiat Cinquecento Sporting (Abarth)
- Fiat Seicento Sporting (Abarth)

=== Cars produced under Abarth & C. S.p.A. (2007–) ===
- Abarth 500 / Fiat 500 Abarth (NA)
- Abarth 595
- Abarth 695
- Abarth Grande Punto
- Abarth Punto Evo
- Abarth 124 Spider / Fiat 124 Spider Abarth (NA)
- Fiat Abarth Punto
- Abarth Pulse
- Abarth Fastback
- Abarth 600e

=== Cars produced with Abarth tuning ===
- Fiat 500 TwinAir byAbarth
- Fiat 500S by Abarth
- Fiat Avventura Powered by Abarth
- Fiat Urban Cross Powered by Abarth
- Fiat Fastback Limited Edition Powered by Abarth

=== Cars produced by other manufacturers with involvement from Abarth ===
- Lancia Delta S4 for Group B – Helped to engineer the engine which utilised a supercharger and a turbocharger simultaneously.

=== Cars produced under Fiat Corse – N Technology named Abarth ===
- Fiat Punto Abarth (rally version only)
- Fiat Cinquecento 900 Trofeo kitcar (teams had to build up their own rally car from Fiat N Technology derived Abarth racing parts)
- Fiat Cinquecento Sporting 1.1 Rally car
- Fiat Seicento Sporting 1.1 Rally car

== Motorsport ==
=== Rally ===
Year	Car	Driver	1	2	3	4	5	6	7	8	9	10	11	12	DC	Points	MC	Points
2007	Fiat Grande Punto Abarth S2000	(Italy) Andrea Navarra	KEN; 1	TUR; 2	BEL; 3	RUS; 4	POR; Ret	CZE; 7	ITA; 10	SWI; Ret	CHI				3rd	32	2nd	90
2007	Fiat Grande Punto Abarth S2000	(Italy) Umberto Scandola	KEN; Ret	TUR	BEL; 5	RUS	POR	CZE	ITA; 4	SWI; 3	CHI				6th	15	2nd	90
2007	Fiat Grande Punto Abarth S2000	(Finland) Anton Alén	KEN	TUR; 4	BEL	RUS; 1	POR	CZE; Ret	ITA	SWI	CHI				7th	15	2nd	90
2007	Fiat Grande Punto Abarth S2000	(Italy) Giandomenico Basso	KEN	TUR	BEL	RUS	POR; 1	CZE	ITA; 2	SWI	CHI				5th	18	2nd	90
2008	Fiat Grande Punto Abarth S2000	(Italy) Giandomenico Basso	TUR; Ret	POR; 4	BEL; 6	RUS; 3	POR; 2	CZE; Ret	ESP; 1	ITA; 1	SWI; 5	CHI			3rd	32	2nd	74
2008	Fiat Grande Punto Abarth S2000	(Finland) Anton Alén	TUR; 3	POR; Ret	BEL; 11	RUS; 2	POR	CZE; Ret	ESP; 6	ITA; 8	SWI; 6	CHI			5th	21	2nd	74
2008	Fiat Grande Punto Abarth S2000	(Italy) Umberto Scandola	TUR	POR	BEL	RUS	POR; 7	CZE	ESP	ITA; Ret	SWI; Ret	CHI			28th	2	2nd	74
2008	Fiat Grande Punto Abarth S2000	(Italy) Renato Travaglia	TUR	POR	BEL	RUS	POR	CZE	ESP	ITA; 4	SWI	CHI			6th*	19*	2nd	74
2008	Fiat Grande Punto Abarth S2000	(Italy) Alessio Pissi	TUR	POR	BEL	RUS	POR	CZE	ESP	ITA; 13	SWI	CHI			-	0	2nd	74
2008	Fiat Grande Punto Abarth S2000	(Italy) Andrea Navarra	TUR	POR	BEL	RUS	POR	CZE	ESP	ITA; Ret	SWI	CHI			-	0	2nd	74
2009	Fiat Grande Punto Abarth S2000	(Italy) Giandomenico Basso	MON; 5	BRA; 3	KEN	POR; Ret	BEL; 8	RUS; 3	POR; 1	CZE; Ret	ESP; 8	ITA	SCO		5th	28	4th	43
2009	Fiat Grande Punto Abarth S2000	(Finland) Anton Alén	MON; Ret	BRA; Ret	KEN	POR; 14	BEL	RUS; 7	POR	CZE	ESP	ITA	SCO		34th	3	4th	43
2009	Fiat Grande Punto Abarth S2000	(Italy) Luca Rossetti	MON; Ret	BRA	KEN	POR	BEL	RUS	POR; Ret	CZE; 10	ESP	ITA; 2	SCO		10th	8	4th	43
2009	Fiat Grande Punto Abarth S2000	(Belgium) Bernd Casier	MON	BRA	KEN	POR	BEL; 14	RUS	POR	CZE	ESP	ITA	SCO		-	0	4th	43
2009	Fiat Grande Punto Abarth S2000	(Spain) Miguel Fuster	MON	BRA	KEN	POR	BEL	RUS	POR	CZE	ESP; Ret	ITA	SCO		-	0	4th	43
2009	Fiat Grande Punto Abarth S2000	(Italy) Umberto Scandola	MON	BRA	KEN	POR	BEL	RUS	POR	CZE	ESP	ITA; 11	SCO		-	0	4th	43
2009	Fiat Grande Punto Abarth S2000	(Belgium) François Duval	MON	BRA	KEN	POR	BEL	RUS	POR	CZE	ESP	ITA; Ret	SCO		-	0	4th	43
2010	Fiat Grande Punto Abarth S2000	(Italy) Luca Rossetti	MON	BRA	ARG	CAN	ITA	BEL	AZO	MAD	CZE	ITA; 5	SCO	CYP	22nd	4	6th	6
2010	Fiat Grande Punto Abarth S2000	(Italy) Giandomenico Basso	MON	BRA	ARG	CAN	ITA	BEL	AZO	MAD	CZE	ITA; 7	SCO	CYP	36th	2	6th	6

== FIA R-GT Cup ==
- 2017 FIA R-GT Cup (Runner-up)
- 2018 FIA R-GT Cup (Champion)
- 2019 FIA R-GT Cup (Champion)
- 2020 FIA R-GT Cup (Champion)
