= Monti Iblei Cup =

Italian annual hillclimbing car competition in Sicily

Coppa Monti Iblei
Salita dei Monti Iblei
- Location: Chiaramonte Gulfi, Sicily, Italy
- Opened: 1951
- Major Events: Trofeo italiano velocità montagna
- Hill Length: 8.5 kilometres (5.3 mi)

The Monti Iblei Cup (in Italian Coppa Monti Iblei) is a car competition, more precisely a hillclimbing, which takes place annually in Chiaramonte Gulfi (Sicily).

== The event ==
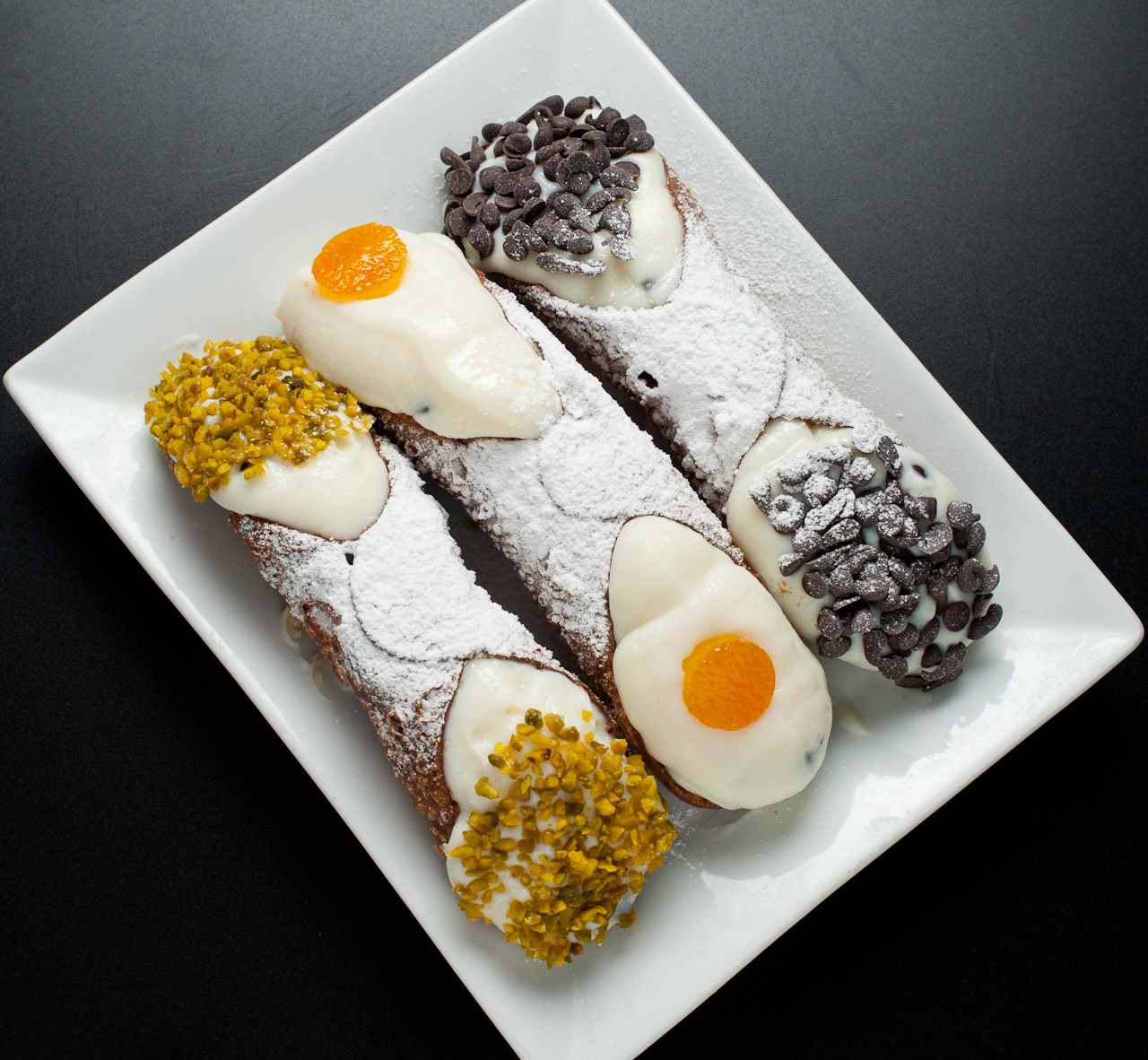
Cannoli siciliani, a specialty of the event.

The race is disputed as tradition, on the hairpin bends of Mount Arcibessi. In recent years the path on Hyblaean Mountains has been slightly lengthened, this extension made the race recognized as a valid race for the Trofeo italiano velocità montagna-sud, Sicilian hill speed championship and Sicilian hill speed championship for historic cars. Also allowing a better and easier use, to those who can arrive from Ragusa, from Modica, from Vittoria from the nearby mountain Municipalities such as Monterosso Almo and Giarratana, but also from other Hyblean areas, in addition to allowing a greater tourist flow.

In Piazza Duomo, to Chiaramonte Gulfi, it is possible to taste typical Sicilian dishes by the local associations that adhere to the initiative (Association Contrada Muti, Association Contrada Piano dell’Acqua and Youth Association of Roccazzo).

== Points of the racecourse ==
Departure from Bar Pentagono, Villaggio Gulfi shopping center, curve of the oil mill, curve of the four chapels, ring road, curve of the forest barracks, Sanctuary of the Madonna delle Grazie and on arrival) and in the city center (Balcony of Sicily, Corso Umberto and Piazza Duomo).

== Absolute winners (recent) ==
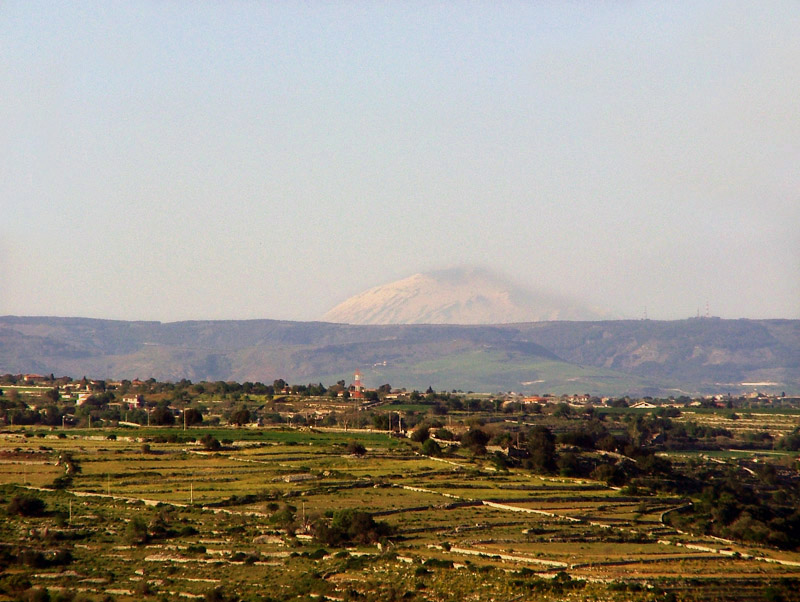
Hyblean landscape

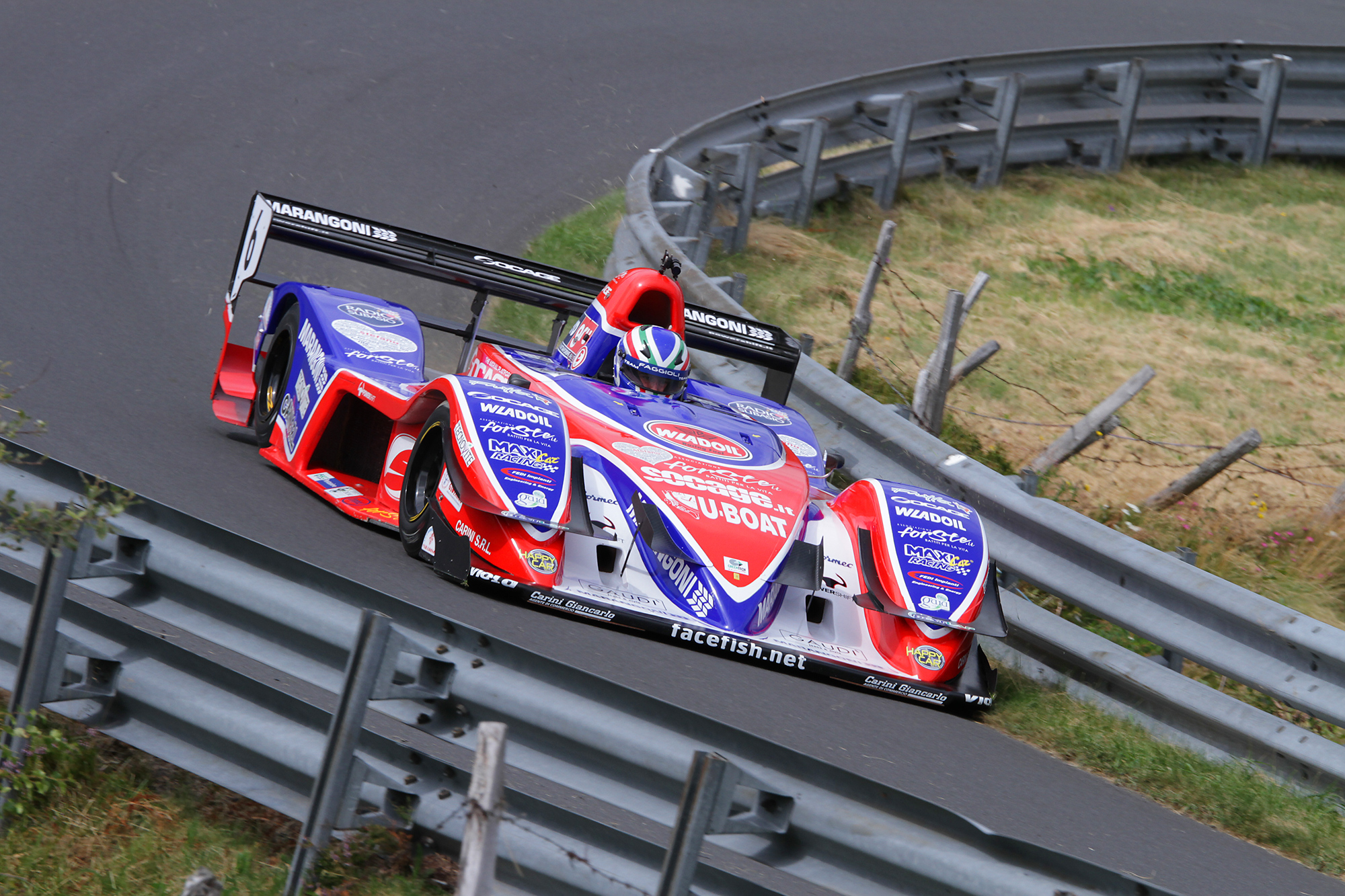
Osella FA30

The following table shows the winners of the event:

- 2004 Giovanni Cassibba Osella BMW
- 2005 Giovanni Cassibba Osella BMW
- 2006 Carmelo Scaramozzino Breda Racing/ BMW
- 2007 Luigi Bruccoleri Osella PA21/S
- 2008 Rocco Aiuto Osella PA20/S
- 2009 Salvatore Tavano Tatuus Master
- 2010 Salvatore Tavano Tatuus Master
- 2011 Luigi Bruccoleri Osella PA27
- 2012 Domenico Scola jr. Osella PA21/S
- 2014 Domenico Cubeda Osella PA2000
- 2015 Domenico Cubeda Osella PA2000
- 2016 Domenico Cubeda Osella PA2000
- 2017 Domenico Cubeda Osella FA30 Zytek
- 2018 Domenico Cubeda Osella FA30 Zytek
- 2019 Domenico Cubeda Osella FA30 Zytek
- 2020 Not held due to the COVID-19 pandemic
- 2021 Domenico Cubeda Osella FA30 Zytek
- 2022 Francesco Conticelli Nova Proto NP01 Zytek
- 2023 Franco Caruso Nova Proto NP01/3000
- 2024 Franco Caruso Nova Proto Np01 Zytec

== Bibliography ==
- "50 anni e non li dimostra", edition: Elle Due, on behalf of Automobile Club d'Italia of Ragusa (2007).

== See also ==
- Catania-Etna (Hill Climb)
- Giarre-Montesalice-Milo (Hill Climb)
- Nissena Cup (Hill Climb)
