= Mario Casciaro =

American lawyer

Mario A. Casciaro is an American man who was originally convicted for the 2002 disappearance and presumed murder of Brian Carrick in Johnsburg, Illinois, then later released due to an overturned verdict.

== Conviction and appeal ==
Brian Carrick's body has never been found. Casciaro was first arrested in June 2007 and charged in McHenry County with nine counts of perjury related to the disappearance of Carrick. He was acquitted by way of a directed verdict during a bench trial in September 2009. He was subsequently arrested in February 2010 and charged with 6 counts of Felony Murder. The state nolle prossed four of the counts and proceeded to trial on the two remaining counts of Felony Murder by Intimidation and Unlawful Restraint. The January 2012 trial concluded in a hung jury. He was tried a third time in 2013 on the remaining count of Felony Murder by Intimidation. In his third trial, he was convicted by a jury after a two-day jury deliberation and sentenced to 26 years in the Illinois Department of Corrections. Casciaro is the only person to have ever been charged with Felony Murder Using Intimidation in the history of the United States. Casciaro was also one of 523 people to have ever been brought to trial in a no-body murder case in the history of the United States.

In September 2015, the Second District Appellate Court of Illinois unanimously overturned Casciaro's conviction for Murder on direct appeal. He was represented by Kathleen Zellner, a prominent attorney who is known for her representation of Steven Avery on Making a Murderer Season 2. The court cited insufficiency of evidence and determined that no reasonable juror could have convicted on the evidence presented by the state. The Illinois Supreme Court affirmed the Appellate Court in March 2016.

In March 2017, Casciaro filed a Civil Rights case against McHenry County State's Attorney Office, Johnsburg Police Department, Village of Johnsburg, McHenry Police Department, and City of McHenry in the Northern District of Illinois, Western Division. Casciaro settled with the McHenry County State's Attorney's Office and the Johnsburg Police Department.

== Personal life ==
Mario Casciaro is a 2005 graduate of Illinois State University with a bachelor's degree in finance and a minor in political science. In 2005, he opened a supermarket in Fox Lake, Illinois with his family. In 2016, less than a year after his release from Menard Correctional Center, Casciaro entered law school at Loyola University Chicago School of Law. He graduated law school in January 2019 with a JD and a Certificate of Advocacy from Loyola University Chicago. During law school, he interned at the Federal Defender's Program for the Northern District of Illinois; he also clerked for Thomas A. Durkin, a nationally recognized defense attorney specializing in federal terrorism cases. On November 7, 2019, Casciaro was sworn in to the Illinois State Bar.
