= Fleri =

Fleri is a surname. Notable people with the surname include:

- Diane Fleri (born 1983), French-born Italian actress
- Vaclava Fleri (1888–1983), Lithuanian painter
