= Macchia, Giarre =

Macchia
- Frazione
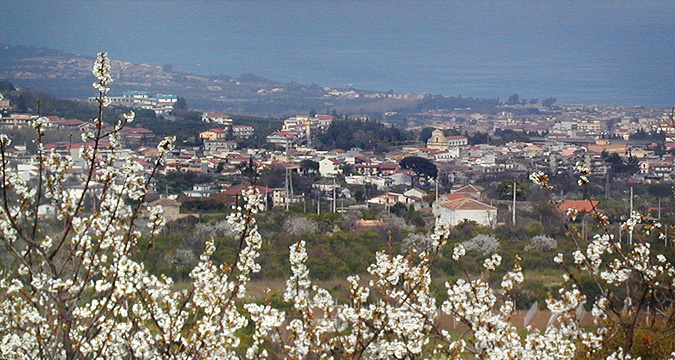

- Location of Macchia in Italy
- Coordinates: 37°43′05″N 15°19′56″E
- Country: Italy
- Region: Sicily
- Province: Catania (CT)
- Comune: Giarre
- Elevation: 173 m (568 ft)
- Demonym: Macchiesi
- Time zone: UTC+1 (CET)
  - Summer (DST): UTC+2 (CEST)
- Postal code: 95014
- Dialing code: 095
- Patron saint: St. Vitus

Macchia is a frazione of the comune of Giarre, province of Catania, in the island of Sicily, Italy.
