= FIA Group E =

FIA regulated racing class

Group E is a formula racing class governed by the FIA for racing cars. Group E was first mentioned in Appendix J of the International Sporting Code in 1990.

== Summary ==
Group E features very few technical regulations. For safety regulations the articles refer to the category (I, II or III) the car is comparable with.

Group E features four different subclasses:

- Category I: Vehicles comparable to Category I must comply with the homologation criteria of Group N, Group A or Group R and have at least 4 seats and their original structure must remain identifiable at any time.
- Category II-SH: Silhouette-type cars (Cars with the appearance of a large production car with 4 seats);
- Category II-SC: Sports cars (Two seater competition cars, open or closed, built especially for competition);
- Category II-SS: Single-seater track type cars of International Formula or Free Formula cars.

Category I
Category II-SH
| Engine size | weight |
|---|---|
| Up to 1,000 cc (61.0 cu in) | 500 kilograms (1,100 lb) |
| Up to 1,400 cc (85.4 cu in) | 550 kilograms (1,210 lb) |
| Up to 1,600 cc (97.6 cu in) | 580 kilograms (1,280 lb) |
| Up to 2,000 cc (122.0 cu in) | 620 kilograms (1,370 lb) |
| Up to 3,000 cc (183.1 cu in) | 700 kilograms (1,500 lb) |
| Up to 4,000 cc (244.1 cu in) | 780 kilograms (1,720 lb) |
| Up to 5,000 cc (305.1 cu in) | 860 kilograms (1,900 lb) |
| Up to 6,500 cc (396.7 cu in) | 960 kilograms (2,120 lb) |

Category II-SC
Category II-SS
| Engine size | weight |
|---|---|
| Up to 1,150 cc (70.2 cu in) | 360 kilograms (790 lb) |
| Up to 1,400 cc (85.4 cu in) | 420 kilograms (930 lb) |
| Up to 1,600 cc (97.6 cu in) | 450 kilograms (990 lb) |
| Up to 2,000 cc (122.0 cu in) | 470 kilograms (1,040 lb) |
| Up to 3,000 cc (183.1 cu in) | 560 kilograms (1,230 lb) |
| Up to 4,000 cc (244.1 cu in) | 700 kilograms (1,500 lb) |
| Up to 5,000 cc (305.1 cu in) | 765 kilograms (1,687 lb) |
| Up to 6,000 cc (366.1 cu in) | 810 kilograms (1,790 lb) |
| Over 6,000 cc (366.1 cu in) | 850 kilograms (1,870 lb) |

== Cars ==
Many cars fall within the rules of Group E. Examples are the Tatuus N.T07 (SS) and the Renault Mégane Trophy (SH).

| Manufacturer | Model | Image | Debut |
|---|---|---|---|
| (France) Ligier | JS P4 | | 2018 |
| (France) Norma | M20 | | 2003 |
| (Italy) Osella | FA30 | | 2004 |
| (Italy) Osella | PA2000 | | 2013 |
| (Italy) Osella | PA20 | | 1994 |
| (Italy) Osella | PA27 | | 2008 |
| (Italy) Osella | PA30 | | 2012 |
| (France) Renault | Mégane Trophy | | 2005 |
| (Italy) Tatuus | N.T07 | | 2007 |
