= Nissena Cup =

Coppa Nissena
- Location: Caltanissetta, Sicily, Italy
- Opened: 1922
- Major Events: Campionato Italiano Velocità Montagna
- Hill Length: 4,904 kilometres (3,047 mi)

The Nissena Cup (Coppa Nissena in Italian) is an automobile competition that takes place every year in Sicily. It is a hillclimbing race and is a valid test for the Italian Hillclimb Championship (CIVM) and the Mountain Trophy. It is organized by the Automobile Club d'Italia.

The length of the route is 4904 meters and the average gradient is 4.19%.

== History ==
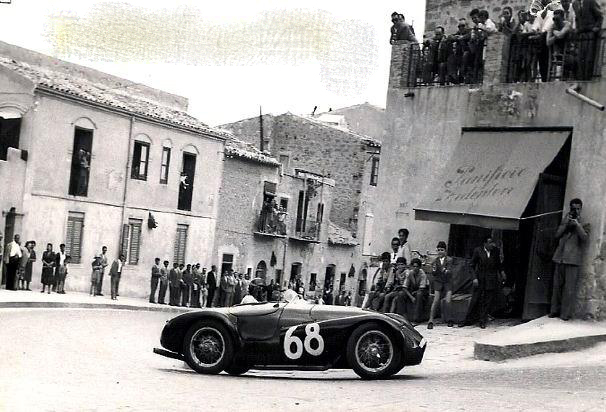
1955

The date of the first Nissena Cup dates back to May 24, 1922, on the occasion of the inauguration of the war memorial of the Great War, in Viale Regina Margherita in Caltanissetta. The route of the time was 166.6 km long, which would be covered in two turns, starting with via Sant'Anna and reaching Imera, passing through Capodarso and Castrogiovanni (today Enna). The first edition was won by Luigi López, with an Itala.

The Nissena Cup for the outbreak of World War II in the first place, but also for organizational reasons, disappears from the calendar for 25 years. The return was only in 1949, with a new formula: hillclimbing and the route is shortened to only 12 km. Since 1968, born the prototype era.

== Winners ==
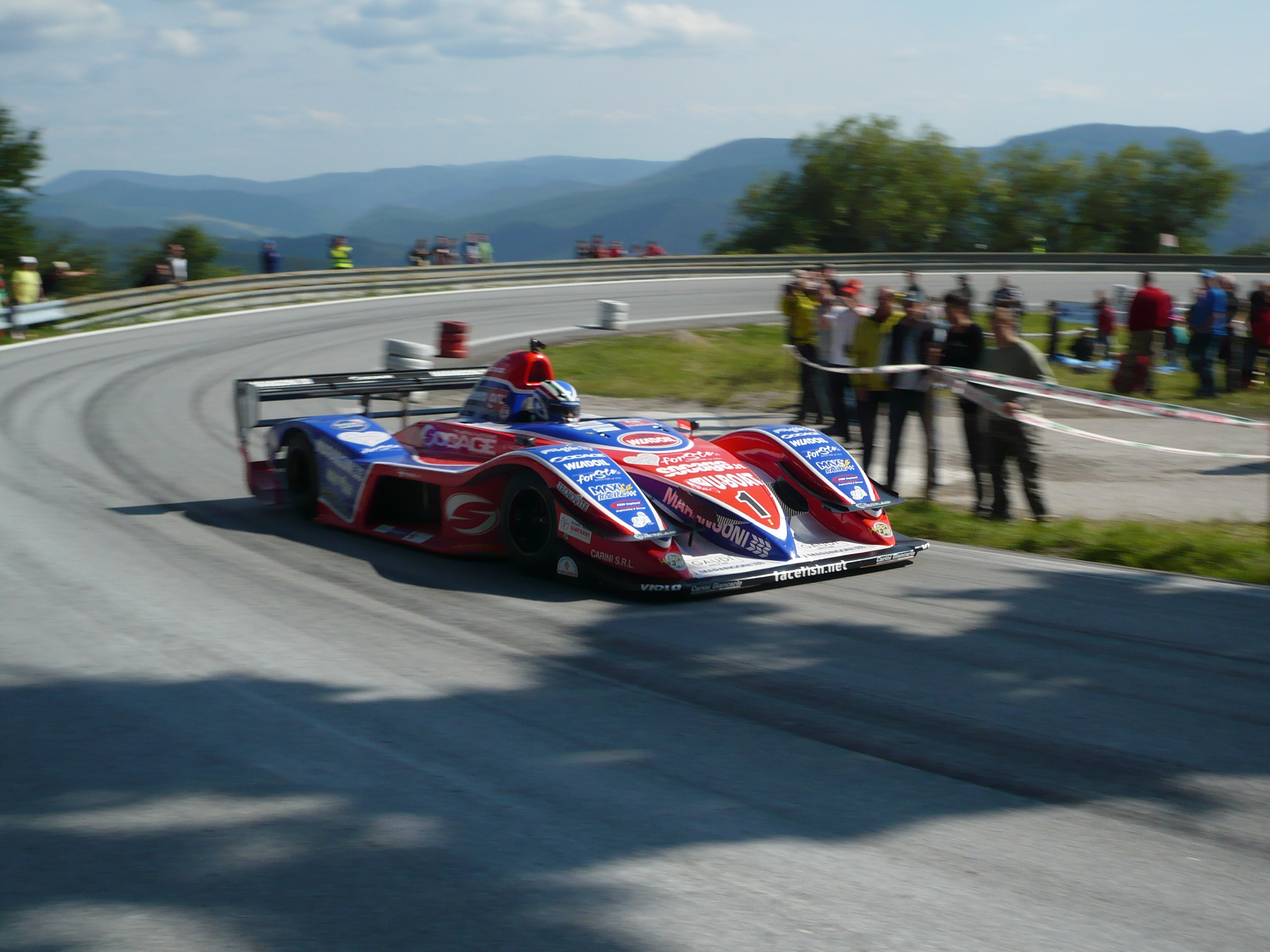
Simone Faggioli (Osella FA30)

The following table shows the winners of the event:

Year	Pilot	Car
1922	Luigi Lopez	Itala
1923	Salvatore Curatolo	Ceirano
1924	Giulio Pucci	Ansaldo
1949	Luigi Bordonaro	Ferrari
1951	Antonio Pucci	Ferrari
1953	Luigi Bordonaro	Ferrari
1955	Antonio Pucci	Ferrari
1958	Pasquale Tacci	Alfa Romeo Giulietta Sprint
1959	Nino Todaro	Ferrari
1960	Vincenzo Riolo	Alfa Romeo 1300
1964	Giacomo Moioli (Noris)	Porsche 906
1965	Clemente Ravetto	Ferrari 250 GTO
1966	Ignazio Capuano	Porsche 906
1967	Stefano Alongi	Alfa Romeo Giulietta SZ
1968	Ferdinando Latteri	Ferrari Dino 206/6
1969	Mariano Spadafora	Abarth 2000
1970	Eugenio Renna (Amphicar)	Abarth 2000
1971	Carlo Facetti	Chevron B19
1972	Nino Vaccarella	Abarth Osella
1973	Eugenio Renna (Amphicar)	Chevron B23
1975	Carlo Facetti	Lola Ferraris
1976	Domenico Scola	Chevron BMW
1977	Eugenio Renna (Amphicar)	Osella PA5
1978	Eugenio Renna (Amphicar)	Osella Lubiam
1979	Eugenio Renna (Amphicar)	Osella Lubiam
1981	Mauro Nesti	Osella PA7
1982	Benny Rosolia	Osella PA9
1983	Mauro Nesti	Osella PA9
1984	Enrico Grimaldi	Osella PA9
1985	Benny Rosolia	Osella PA9
1986	Mauro Nesti	Osella PA9
1987	Mauro Nesti	Lucchini BMW
1988	Giovanni Cassibba	Osella PA9
1989	Mauro Nesti	Osella Cebora BMW
1990	Mauro Nesti	Osella Cebora BMW
1991	Mauro Nesti	Osella Cebora BMW
1992	Giulio Regosa	Osella PA9/90
1993	Mauro Nesti	Lucchini BMW
1994	Luigi Di Natali	Ford Escort Csw
1995	Angelo Palazzo	GISA - Alfa Romeo
1996	Mauro Nesti	Lucchini BMW
1997	Mirco Savoldi	Lucchini BMW
1998	Antonio Iaria	Osella PA20/S BMW
1999	Mirco Savoldi	Lucchini BMW P198
2000	Franco Cinelli	Osella PA20/S BMW
2001	Franco Cinelli	Osella PA20/S BMW
2002	Simone Faggioli	Osella PA20/S BMW
2003	Giovanni Cassiba	Osella PA20/S BMW
2004	Simone Faggioli	Osella PA20/S BMW
2005	Denny Zardo	Osella PA20/S BMW
2006	Franco Cinelli	Osella PA20/S BMW
2007	Franco Cinelli	Lola Mugen Honda
2008	Denny Zardo	Reynard Formula Nippon
2009	Simone Faggioli	Osella FA30 Zytek
2010	Simone Faggioli	Osella FA30 Zytek
2011	Simone Faggioli	Osella FA30 Zytek
2012	Simone Faggioli	Osella FA30 Zytek
2013	Simone Faggioli	Osella FA30 Zytek
2014	Christian Merli	Osella PA2000
2015	Christian Merli	Osella FA30
2016	Domenico Scola	Osella FA30 Zytek
2017	Domenico Scola	Osella FA30 Zytek
2018	Christian Merli	Osella FA30 Zytek
2019	Simone Faggioli	Norma M20-FC

== See also ==
- Catania-Etna (Hill Climb)
- Giarre-Montesalice-Milo (Hill Climb)
- Monti Iblei Cup (Hill Climb)
