= 2014 FIA Hill Climb Masters =

Amazing FIA hill climb masters

- Location: (Luxembourg) Eschdorf
- Coordinates: 49º53'N 5º56'E
- Hill Length: 1.850 kilometres (1.150 mi)
- Hill Record: 0:48.344 (Nicolas Schatz, 2014, Category III)

Next Edition
2016 FIA Hill Climb Masters

The 2014 FIA Hill Climb Masters was the first edition of FIA Hill Climb Masters, between the winners of hill climb national championships, and the winners of the FIA Hill Climb Competitions. The event was held between 11 and 12 October 2014 in Eschdorf, Luxembourg.

The overall win was taken by Frenchman Nicolas Schatz, at the wheel of his Category III Norma, as he recorded a time of 48.344 seconds for the 1.85 km (1.15 mi) run. He finished almost a quarter of a second clear of Scott Moran, in his Gould, while the best of the Category II cars finished in third place with Eric Berguerand driving his Formula 3000 Lola. The top Category I driver was Yanick Bodson, recording a time of 60.834 seconds. In the Nations' Cup, countries were ranked in their consistency; three drivers per nation were considered, with the gaps between a driver's two runs counting towards the rankings. Italy's gap of 3.182 seconds was the smallest and therefore won the Cup, beating Switzerland's gap of 3.463 seconds, while third place went to Austria, with their gap of 4.952 seconds.

== Results ==
=== Individual classification ===
Cat	Pos	Driver	Car	Time
Cat. I	1	(Belgium) Yanick Bodson	Porsche 997 GT3 Cup	1:00.834
Cat. I	2	(Czech Republic) Jaromir Maly	Mitsubishi Lancer Evo VIII	1:01.214
Cat. I	3	(France) Nicolas Werver	Porsche 997 GT3 Cup	1:01.398
Cat. II	1	(Switzerland) Eric Berguerand	Lola B99-Cosworth	0:49.113
Cat. II	2	(Italy) Simone Faggioli	Norma M20 FC-Zytek	0:49.233
Cat. II	3	(Luxembourg) David Hauser	Wolf GB08F1	0:49.372
Cat. III	1	(France) Nicolas Schatz	Norma M20 FC V8-BMW	0:48.344
Cat. III	2	(United Kingdom) Scott Moran	Gould GR61X-NME	0:48.587
Cat. III	3	(United Kingdom) Will Hall	Force wh-xtec-Nissan	0:49.180

=== Nations Cup ===
Pos	Nation	Drivers	Diff.
1	Italy	Simone Faggioli; Omar Magliona; Christian Merli; Fausto Bormolini	+3.182
2	Switzerland	Eric Berguerand; Roger Schnellmann; Albin Mächler; Ronnie Bratschi	+3.463
3	Austria	Andreas Gabat; Herbert Pregartner; Ferdinand Madrian; Christian Schweiger	+4.952

== See also ==
- European Hill Climb Championship
- FIA International Hill Climb Cup
- Hillclimbing
- Mont Ventoux Hill Climb
