= 2014 European Hill Climb Championship =

Seasons
- ← 2013 2015 →

The 2014 FIA European Hill Climb Championship was the fifty-eighth edition of the FIA European Hill Climb Championship. The season consisted of twelve rounds, commencing on 11 April in France and ending on 21 September in Croatia.

In Category 1, the championship was won by Macedonian driver Igor Stefanovski, for his first European title. Stefanovski won 8 of the 12 events to be held during the season, ultimately finishing 48.5 points clear of his closest rival Jaromír Malý. Another Czech driver, Jiří Los, finished in third place in the class championship, a further 18.5 points behind Malý; Los was the only championship regular to take a victory off Stefanovski, achieving his win at the Ecce Homo Šternberk on home soil. The remaining class victories were taken by António Nogueira at the Rampa Internacional da Falperra, Peter Jureňa at the Dobšinsky Kopec and the defending class champion, Tomislav Muhvić, on home soil at the final round, the Buzetski Dani. In Category 2, Simone Faggioli dominated the class, winning his sixth consecutive European title by going undefeated during the season; he won all 12 events to be held, of which 10 counted towards the championship standings. Thus, Faggioli finished 57.5 points clear of his nearest rival, compatriot Fausto Bormolini, while Dan Michl finished a further 31.5 points behind in third place.

== Calendar ==
Round	Dates	Venue	City	Country
1	11 – 13 April	Course de Côte Saint Jean du Gard - Col Saint Pierre	Saint-Jean-du-Gard	France
2	25 – 27 April	Grosser Bergpreis von Österreich	Tulwitz	Austria
3	10 – 11 May	35ª Rampa Internacional da Falperra	Braga	Portugal
4	16 – 18 May	XLIII Subida Internacional al Fito	Parres	Spain
5	7 – 8 June	Ecce Homo Sternberk	Šternberk	Czech Republic
6	13 – 15 June	Limanowa	Limanowa	Poland
7	27 – 29 June	53° Coppa Paolino Teodori	Ascoli Piceno	Italy
8	19 – 20 July	Dobsinsky Kopec	Dobšiná	Slovakia
9	25 – 27 July	ADAC Glasbachrennen	Steinbach, Eichsfeld	Germany
10	16 – 17 August	Course de côte St. Ursanne - Les Rangiers	Saint-Ursanne	Switzerland
11	30 – 31 August	20. GHD Ilirska Bistrica	Ilirska Bistrica	Slovenia
12	20 – 21 September	Buzetski Dani	Buzet	Croatia

== Event results ==
Race	Cat	Podium		
Race	Cat	Place	Driver	Car
(France) Course de Côte Saint Jean du Gard; Col Saint Pierre	I	1	(North Macedonia) Igor Stefanovski	Mitsubishi Lancer Evo IX
(France) Course de Côte Saint Jean du Gard; Col Saint Pierre	I	2	(Czech Republic) Jir Los	Mitsubishi Lancer Evo IX
(France) Course de Côte Saint Jean du Gard; Col Saint Pierre	I	3	(Czech Republic) Oskar Benes	Mitsubishi Lancer Evo X
(France) Course de Côte Saint Jean du Gard; Col Saint Pierre	II	1	(Italy) Simone Faggioli	Norma M20-FC
(France) Course de Côte Saint Jean du Gard; Col Saint Pierre	II	2	(Italy) Christian Merli	Osella PA2000
(France) Course de Côte Saint Jean du Gard; Col Saint Pierre	II	3	(Switzerland) Eric Berguerand	Lola FA99
(Austria) Grosser Bergpreis von Österreich	I	1	(North Macedonia) Igor Stefanovski	Mitsubishi Lancer Evo IX
(Austria) Grosser Bergpreis von Österreich	I	2	(Czech Republic) Jir Los	Mitsubishi Lancer Evo IX
(Austria) Grosser Bergpreis von Österreich	I	3	(Czech Republic) Oskar Benes	Mitsubishi Lancer Evo X
(Austria) Grosser Bergpreis von Österreich	II	1	(Italy) Simone Faggioli	Norma M20-FC
(Austria) Grosser Bergpreis von Österreich	II	2	(Italy) Omar Magliona	Osella PA21Evo
(Austria) Grosser Bergpreis von Österreich	II	3	(Czech Republic) Dusan Neveril	Norma M20-FC
(Portugal) 35ª Rampa Internacional da Falperra	I	1	(Portugal) António Nogueira	Porsche GT3 R
(Portugal) 35ª Rampa Internacional da Falperra	I	2	(Czech Republic) Jir Los	Mitsubishi Lancer Evo IX
(Portugal) 35ª Rampa Internacional da Falperra	I	3	(Spain) Sergi Pañella	Mitsubishi Lancer Evo IX
(Portugal) 35ª Rampa Internacional da Falperra	II	1	(Italy) Simone Faggioli	Norma M20-FC
(Portugal) 35ª Rampa Internacional da Falperra	II	2	(Italy) Fausto Bormolini	Reynard K02
(Portugal) 35ª Rampa Internacional da Falperra	II	3	(Italy) Federico Liber	Reynard K02
(Spain) XLIII Subida Internacional al Fito	I	1	(North Macedonia) Igor Stefanovski	Mitsubishi Lancer Evo IX
(Spain) XLIII Subida Internacional al Fito	I	2	(Czech Republic) Jir Los	Mitsubishi Lancer Evo IX
(Spain) XLIII Subida Internacional al Fito	I	3	(Spain) Sergi Pañella	Mitsubishi Lancer Evo IX
(Spain) XLIII Subida Internacional al Fito	II	1	(Italy) Simone Faggioli	Norma M20-FC
(Spain) XLIII Subida Internacional al Fito	II	2	(Czech Republic) Milos Benes	Osella FA30
(Spain) XLIII Subida Internacional al Fito	II	3	(Spain) Andrés Vilariño	Osella 2000
(Czech Republic) Ecce Homo Sternberk	I	1	(Czech Republic) Jir Los	Mitsubishi Lancer Evo IX
(Czech Republic) Ecce Homo Sternberk	I	2	(North Macedonia) Igor Stefanovski	Mitsubishi Lancer Evo IX
(Czech Republic) Ecce Homo Sternberk	I	3	(Czech Republic) Gabriela Sajlerová	Mitsubishi Lancer Evo X
(Czech Republic) Ecce Homo Sternberk	II	1	(Italy) Simone Faggioli	Norma M20-FC
(Czech Republic) Ecce Homo Sternberk	II	2	(Italy) Fausto Bormolini	Reynard K02
(Czech Republic) Ecce Homo Sternberk	II	3	(Czech Republic) Milos Benes	Osella FA30
(Poland) Limanowa	I	1	(North Macedonia) Igor Stefanovski	Mitsubishi Lancer Evo IX
(Poland) Limanowa	I	2	(Poland) Marcin Słobodzian	Mitsubishi Lancer Evo IX
(Poland) Limanowa	I	3	(Czech Republic) Jir Los	Mitsubishi Lancer Evo IX
(Poland) Limanowa	II	1	(Italy) Simone Faggioli	Norma M20-FC
(Poland) Limanowa	II	2	(Italy) Fausto Bormolini	Reynard K02
(Poland) Limanowa	II	3	(Poland) Robert Steć	Lola T96/50 Zytek
(Italy) 53° Coppa Paolino Teodori	I	1	(North Macedonia) Igor Stefanovski	Mitsubishi Lancer Evo IX
(Italy) 53° Coppa Paolino Teodori	I	2	(Italy) Armin Hafner	Mitsubishi Lancer Evo IX
(Italy) 53° Coppa Paolino Teodori	I	3	(Czech Republic) Martin Jerman	Mitsubishi Lancer Evo IX
(Italy) 53° Coppa Paolino Teodori	II	1	(Italy) Simone Faggioli	Norma M20-FC
(Italy) 53° Coppa Paolino Teodori	II	2	(Italy) Christian Merli	Osella PA2000
(Italy) 53° Coppa Paolino Teodori	II	3	(Italy) Frederico Liber	Reynard K02
(Slovakia) Dobsinsky Kopec	I	1	(Slovakia) Peter Jureňa	Mitsubishi Lancer Evo IX
(Slovakia) Dobsinsky Kopec	I	2	(Slovakia) Vlastimil Majerčák	Mitsubishi Lancer Evo IX
(Slovakia) Dobsinsky Kopec	I	3	(North Macedonia) Igor Stefanovski	Mitsubishi Lancer Evo IX
(Slovakia) Dobsinsky Kopec	II	1	(Italy) Simone Faggioli	Norma M20-FC
(Slovakia) Dobsinsky Kopec	II	2	(Czech Republic) Milos Benes	Osella FA30
(Slovakia) Dobsinsky Kopec	II	3	(Italy) Frederico Liber	Osella FA30
(Germany) ADAC Glasbachrennen	I	1	(North Macedonia) Igor Stefanovski	Mitsubishi Lancer Evo IX
(Germany) ADAC Glasbachrennen	I	2	(Czech Republic) Jir Los	Mitsubishi Lancer Evo IX
(Germany) ADAC Glasbachrennen	I	3	(Czech Republic) Filip Sajler	Mitsubishi Lancer Evo X
(Germany) ADAC Glasbachrennen	II	1	(Italy) Simone Faggioli	Norma M20-FC
(Germany) ADAC Glasbachrennen	II	2	(Czech Republic) Milos Benes	Osella FA30
(Germany) ADAC Glasbachrennen	II	3	(Italy) Frederico Liber	Osella FA30
(Switzerland) Course de côte St. Ursanne; Les Rangiers	I	1	(North Macedonia) Igor Stefanovski	Mitsubishi Lancer Evo IX
(Switzerland) Course de côte St. Ursanne; Les Rangiers	I	2	(Czech Republic) Martin Jerman	Mitsubishi Lancer Evo IX
(Switzerland) Course de côte St. Ursanne; Les Rangiers	I	3	(Czech Republic) Jir Los	Mitsubishi Lancer Evo IX
(Switzerland) Course de côte St. Ursanne; Les Rangiers	II	1	(Italy) Simone Faggioli	Norma M20-FC
(Switzerland) Course de côte St. Ursanne; Les Rangiers	II	2	(Italy) Christian Merli	Osella PA2000
(Switzerland) Course de côte St. Ursanne; Les Rangiers	II	3	(France) Xavier Vermeille	Norma M20-FC
(Slovenia) 20. GHD Ilirska Bistrica	I	1	(North Macedonia) Igor Stefanovski	Mitsubishi Lancer Evo IX
(Slovenia) 20. GHD Ilirska Bistrica	I	2	(Croatia) Tomislav Muhvić	Mitsubishi Lancer Evo IX
(Slovenia) 20. GHD Ilirska Bistrica	I	3	(Czech Republic) Jir Los	Mitsubishi Lancer Evo IX
(Slovenia) 20. GHD Ilirska Bistrica	II	1	(Italy) Simone Faggioli	Norma M20-FC
(Slovenia) 20. GHD Ilirska Bistrica	II	2	(Italy) Frederico Liber	Osella FA30
(Slovenia) 20. GHD Ilirska Bistrica	II	3	(Slovenia) Patrik Zajelšnik	Norma M20 F
(Croatia) Buzetski Dani	I	1	(Croatia) Tomislav Muhvić	Mitsubishi Lancer Evo IX
(Croatia) Buzetski Dani	I	2	(North Macedonia) Igor Stefanovski	Mitsubishi Lancer Evo IX
(Croatia) Buzetski Dani	I	3	(Czech Republic) Jir Los	Mitsubishi Lancer Evo IX
(Croatia) Buzetski Dani	II	1	(Italy) Simone Faggioli	Norma M20-FC
(Croatia) Buzetski Dani	II	2	(Czech Republic) Milos Benes	Osella FA30
(Croatia) Buzetski Dani	II	3	(Italy) Fausto Bormolini	Reynard K02

== See also ==
- FIA International Hill Climb Cup
- Hillclimbing
- Mont Ventoux Hill Climb
