= Reto Meisel =

Swiss hillclimb racing driver (born 1970)

Reto Meisel (born September 17, 1970), is a Swiss hillclimb racing driver, team-owner and automotive specialist from Leuggern. With Meisel Racing Team, he developed and campaigned several high-performance Mercedes-Benz-based hillclimb cars, including the Mercedes-Benz 190 RM1 V8 and the Mercedes-Benz SLK 340 Judd. Meisel has competed in Swiss, German and European hillclimb series and has won multiple national titles as well as a gold medal at the FIA Hill Climb Masters.

== Career ==
Meisel began his motorsport career in 1989 in non-licensed slalom events. From 1991, he competed on racing circuits and in Swiss hillclimb events. In 1998, he won the Swiss InterSwiss Championship driving an Opel Kadett C. Since 1999, Meisel has focused primarily on hillclimbing.

In the following years, Meisel developed his career with Mercedes-Benz-based cars. According to Meisel Racing Team, he won six championship titles in 2002, 2007, 2009, 2011, 2016, and 2022. In 2024, Motorsport Schweiz described him as a three-time Swiss touring-car hillclimb champion and reported on his return to active competition after a period without regular racing appearances.

A significant development step was the Mercedes-Benz SLK 340 Judd, which Meisel Motorsport built for hillclimb racing. The car was presented at the Geneva Motor Show in 2013. Contemporary reports state that the car is powered by a 3.4-litre Judd V8 engine, produces around 610 hp, and weighs approximately 780 kg.

In 2016, Meisel won the Swiss Hillclimb Championship with the Judd DB V8-powered SLK 340. In 2021, he won the gold medal in Category 3 at the FIA Hill Climb Masters in Braga. In 2022, he again secured the Swiss touring-car hillclimb title.

In the 2025 season, Meisel focused on the FIA European Hill Climb Championship and did not contest a full Swiss championship campaign. At the Rechberg round, he won Category 1. Shortly afterward, he also won Category 1 at Rampa da Falperra in Portugal. At the Ecce Homo hillclimb in Šternberk, he finished second in Category 1. In the 2025 FIA season standings, Meisel finished second in Category 1, Group 1, and seventh in the overall Category 1 classification.

Meisel also competed in the FIA European Hill Climb Championship in 2026. According to Motorsport Schweiz, he did not plan to contest all European Championship rounds as he had done the previous year. At the 2026 Rechberg round, he finished third in FIA Category 1. In the interim standings of the 2026 FIA European Hill Climb Championship, Meisel led both Category 1 and Group 1.

== Cars ==
=== Mercedes-Benz 190 RM1 V8 ===
The Mercedes-Benz 190 RM1 V8 was a Meisel Racing Team hillclimb project based on the Mercedes-Benz 190E platform. The car was associated with Meisel's hillclimb campaigns during the 2000s and early 2010s.

=== Mercedes-Benz SLK 340 Judd ===
The Mercedes-Benz SLK 340 Judd is a purpose-built hillclimb car developed by Meisel Motorsport. The car uses a 3.4-litre Judd V8 engine, produces around 610 hp and weighs approximately 780 kg.

== Selected results and titles ==
1998 – InterSwiss – Swiss Champion, Opel Kadett C

2002 – Swiss Hillclimb Champion, touring cars – Mercedes-Benz 190E, Class 1

2007 – German Hillclimb Champion, touring cars – Mercedes-Benz 190E RM1 V8

2009 – German Hillclimb Champion, touring cars – Mercedes-Benz 190E RM1 V8

2011 – German Hillclimb Champion, touring cars – Mercedes-Benz 190E RM1 V8

2016 – Swiss Hillclimb Champion, Mercedes-Benz SLK 340 Judd

2021 – Gold medal at the FIA Hill Climb Masters, Category 3

2022 – Swiss touring-car hillclimb champion, Mercedes-Benz SLK 340 Judd

2025 – Category 1 winner, Rechberg round of the FIA European Hill Climb Championship

2025 – Category 1 winner, Rampa da Falperra round of the FIA European Hill Climb Championship

2025 – Second place, FIA European Hill Climb Championship, Category 1, Group 1

2026 – Leader of the FIA European Hill Climb Championship, Category 1 and Group 1, according to the FIA interim standings as of 29 June 2026

== See also ==
Hillclimbing FIA European Hill Climb Championship Judd (engine)
