= Grzegorz Rożalski =

Polish racing driver

- Nationality: Poland
- Born: 2 August 1982 (age 43) Puławy, Poland
- Years active: 2023–present
- Teams: AMS Stopka (current)

Championship titles
- FIA European Hill Climb Champion (2025); Polish Hill Climb Champion (2024); Polish Hill Climb Runner-up (2023)

Grzegorz Rożalski (born 2 August 1982 in Puławy) is a Polish racing driver specialising in hillclimb racing, entrepreneur and founder of brands in the motorsport and entertainment industry. He competes in national and international championship series, achieving success in the Polish Hill Climb Championship (Górskie Samochodowe Mistrzostwa Polski) and the European Hill Climb Championship.

== Education and business activities ==
Rożalski is a graduate of the Warsaw University of Technology and the Kraków University of Economics. Alongside his racing career, he runs his own business ventures. He is the founder and owner of brands operating in automotive, motorsport and entertainment sectors, including: Prezent Marzeń, GoRacing, Formula Drive, Funzeum, EXP-PRO, Poligon 4x4 and Tutay.

== Early hillclimb career – 2023 season ==
Rożalski began his hillclimbing career in 2023, competing in the full season of the Polish Hill Climb Championship. In his debut season he finished as runner-up in the overall classification and won the championship title in group 2. In his first year of competition he regularly placed at the front of the field.

== Polish Champion – 2024 season ==
In the 2024 season Rożalski again competed in the full Polish Hill Climb Championship, achieving the best result of his national career to date. He finished the season as Polish champion in the overall classification and Polish champion in group 1.

During the season he set new course records at five of the seven track's in which he competed. This achievement was one of the most notable results of the season in Polish hillclimbing.

== International competition – European Hill Climb Championship ==
Following his domestic success, Rożalski turned his sporting development towards the international arena, beginning competition in the European Hill Climb Championship, organised under the auspices of the FIA.

In his first season of European competition he won the European championship title in category 1 (group 1) and the Best Performer award, given to the best driver of the season in the classification.

== 2025 season – championship victory ==
In the 2025 season, despite relatively limited experience in European hillclimbing, Rożalski won the overall European Hill Climb Championship, confirming the effectiveness of his transition from national to international competition at the highest level.

== Car and team ==
Grzegorz Rożalski competes with a Mitsubishi Lancer Evolution IX prepared for hillclimb competition. The car is equipped with four-wheel drive and produces over 1,000 horsepower. In competition, he represents the AMS Stopka team.
