= PA30 =

PA30 may refer to:

== Places ==
- Pa 30 (Patchick #30), the supernova remnant (SNR) system of Supernova (SN) 1181, located in the Constellation Cassiopeia
  - IRAS 00500+6713 (Pa 30), the SNR nebula of SN 1181
- Ardrishaig (PA30), Argyll and Bute, Scotland, UK; a British post code district in the Paisley PA postcode area
- Pennsylvania's 30th congressional district (PA 30), the U.S. House of Representatives congressional district

== Vehicular ==
- Osella PA30, a racecar
- PA30, a model of the Nissan Gloria luxury car
- Piper PA-30 Twin Comanche, a twin-engined light aircraft

== See also ==
- U.S. Route 30 in Pennsylvania
- Pennsylvania House of Representatives, District 30
- Pennsylvania Senate, District 30
- Pennsylvania State Game Lands Number 30, McKean County, Pennsylvania, USA
- PA3 (disambiguation)
- PA (disambiguation)
