= FIA Hill Climb Masters =

Motor racing competition

- Category: single-seater cars, open-cockpit sports prototypes, and touring cars
- Country: International
- Inaugural season: 2014

The FIA Hill Climb Masters is an FIA-run motorsport bi-annual competition, created in 2014, with the goal of reuniting the world's top hill climb drivers in a single event to showcase the discipline and to celebrate national and FIA champions of the year gone by.

The Masters bring together the winners of national championships, and the winners of the FIA Hill Climb Competitions. For this event, each of the drivers has to race with the same car used during the season.

There are two classifications: one Individual Classification and a Nations Cup.

== FIA Hill Climb Masters Champions ==
Year	Location	Class	Driver	Car	Nations Cup
2014	(Luxembourg) Eschdorf	Cat. I	(Belgium) Yanick Bodson	Porsche 997 GT3 Cup	Italy
2014	(Luxembourg) Eschdorf	Cat. II	(Switzerland) Eric Berguerand	Lola B99-Cosworth	Italy
2014	(Luxembourg) Eschdorf	Cat. III	(France) Nicolas Schatz	Norma M20 FC V8-BMW	Italy
2016	(Czech Republic) Šternberk	Cat. I	(Italy) Lucio Peruggini	Ferrari 458 Italia GT3	Slovakia
2016	(Czech Republic) Šternberk	Cat. II	(Italy) Simone Faggioli	Norma M20FC-Zytek	Slovakia
2016	(Czech Republic) Šternberk	Cat. III	(United Kingdom) Scott Moran	Gould GR61X-NME	Slovakia
2018	(Italy) Gubbio	Cat. I	(Italy) Lucio Peruggini	Ferrari 458 Italia GT3	Luxembourg
2018	(Italy) Gubbio	Cat. II	(Italy) Christian Merli	Osella FA30 Evo-Zytek	Luxembourg
2018	(Italy) Gubbio	Cat. III	(Switzerland) Roger Schnellmann	Mitsubishi Lancer Evo VIII	Luxembourg
2018	(Italy) Gubbio	Cat. IV	(United Kingdom) Will Hall	Force WH-Xtec	Luxembourg
2021	(Portugal) Braga	Cat. I	(Poland) Szymon Łukaszczyk	Mitsubishi Lancer Evo V	France
2021	(Portugal) Braga	Cat. II	(Italy) Christian Merli	Osella FA30-Zytek	France
2021	(Portugal) Braga	Cat. III	(Switzerland) Reto Meisel	Mercedes-Benz SLK 340-Judd	France
2021	(Portugal) Braga	Cat. IV	(France) Geoffrey Schatz	NP01-2 Oreca	France

== See also ==
- European Hill Climb Championship
- FIA International Hill Climb Cup
- Hillclimbing
