= David Hauser =

- Born: New York, NY
- Known for: Founder, Grasshopper Group
- Website: www.davidhauser.com

David Hauser is an American entrepreneur, speaker and angel investor. He is best known for co-founding the Grasshopper Group, a virtual telephone service acquired by the Citrix Systems for $170 million in 2015. Hauser is a founding member of the National Entrepreneurs' Day and has co-founded a number of tech companies including Grasshopper, Chargify, Spreadable PopSurvey, Deck Foundry and others.

== Early life and education ==
Hauser was born and raised in New York City. He attended City & Country School in Manhattan. Later, he went to Poly Prep for High school. He received a Bachelor of Science degree in Business Administration from Babson College in 2004.

== Career ==
Hauser started a number of companies when he was in high school. In 1999, Hauser first co-founded an e-mail performance management company, Return Path to improve the content, reach and delivery of permission-based e-mail programs. During his time at Babson College, he met Siamak Taghaddos and they planned to start a virtual telephone service. In February 2003, they launched GotVMail Communications, which gave customers a toll-free or local number to use for incoming calls. They later rebranded GotVMail to Grasshopper to empower entrepreneurs to succeed.

In 2010, he launched PackageFox to track packages and file claims when the shipment were not delivered on time. In 2011, both Hauser and Taghaddos were named in 2011 Inc magazine's 30 under 30 list. Later in the year, they started recurring billing and subscription management service, Chargify and received funding from Mark Cuban. They also started survey service PopSurvey.

In 2015, Grasshopper was acquired by the Citrix Systems of California for $165 million in cash and $8.6 million in stock. He also authored the chapter "Student Entrepreneur Giving Back" about his experience in launching GotVMail.

== Investments ==
Hauser has invested in several technology companies including Intercom, Unbounce, Munchery, Groove and other.

Hauser has also been featured in various business publications, including The Boston Globe, The Wall Street Journal, Business Week and many other.

== Member and accolades ==
- 2005 Small Business Administration's MA Young Entrepreneur Award
- 2006 Honored with 40 Under 40 Business Leaders by American Venture Magazine
- 2007 Deloitte & Touche Fast 50 - Rising Star
- 2009 Better Mousetrap Constructors of New England - Honorable Mention
- 2011 Inc. 30 Under 30 list.
