= Omar Magliona =

Italian racing driver (born 1977)

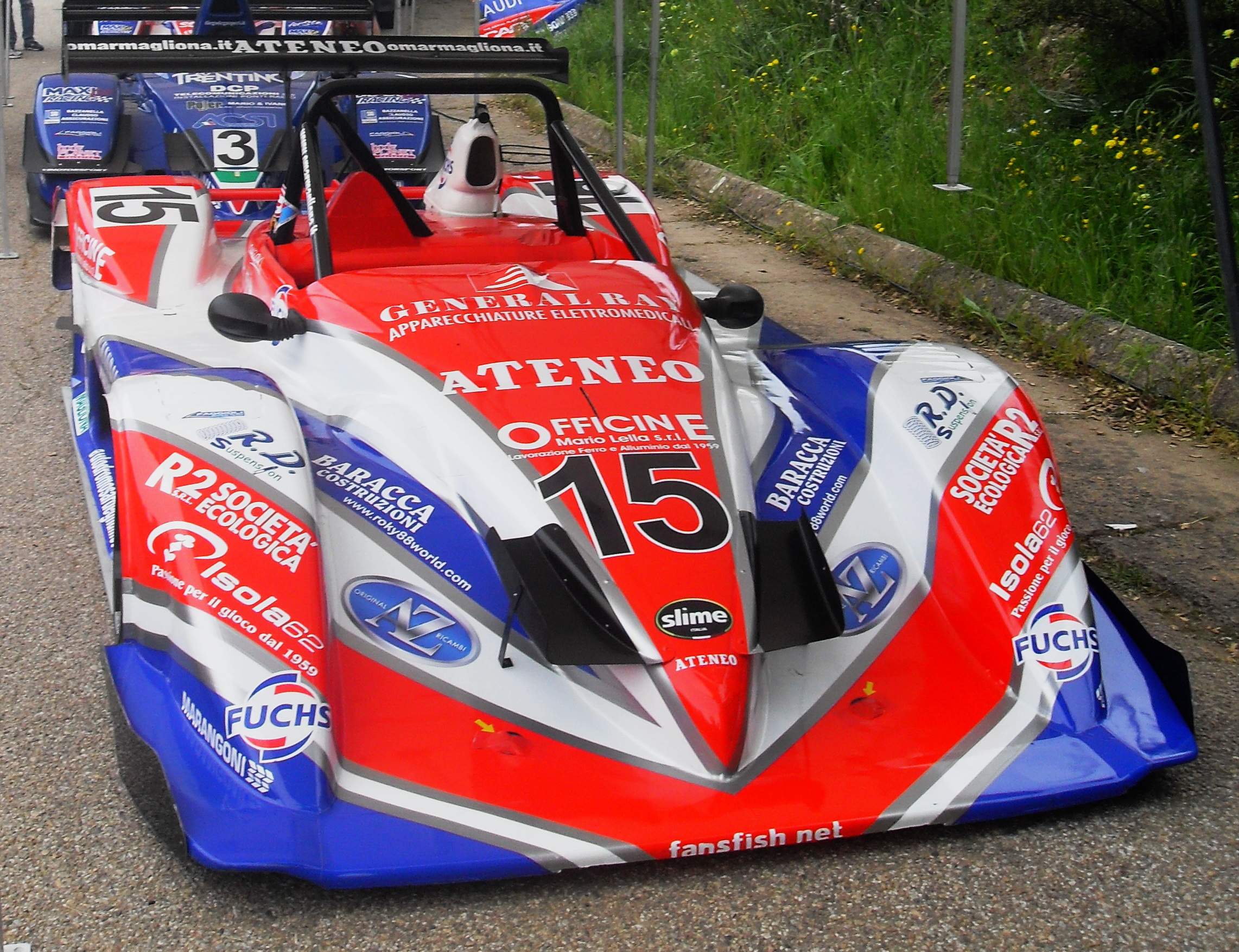
- Born: 27 September 1977; Sassari, Italy

Formula One World Championship career
- Nationality: (Italy) Italian
- Entries: 1

Omar Magliona (Sassari, Sardinia 27 September 1977) is an italian racing driver.

Son of the race driver Uccio Magliona, began his career as go-kart pilot.

At 22 years old he passed steadily to the race cars, especially prototypes.

He is mainly specializing in hill climbings, taking part also to the European Hill Climb Championship .

He and his father commissioned the building of the Franco di Suni National Raceway, the only FIA Circuit homologated by CSAI (Cars) and the IMF (Motorcycles), in Sardinia.
