= Matija Jurišić =

Croatian racing driver

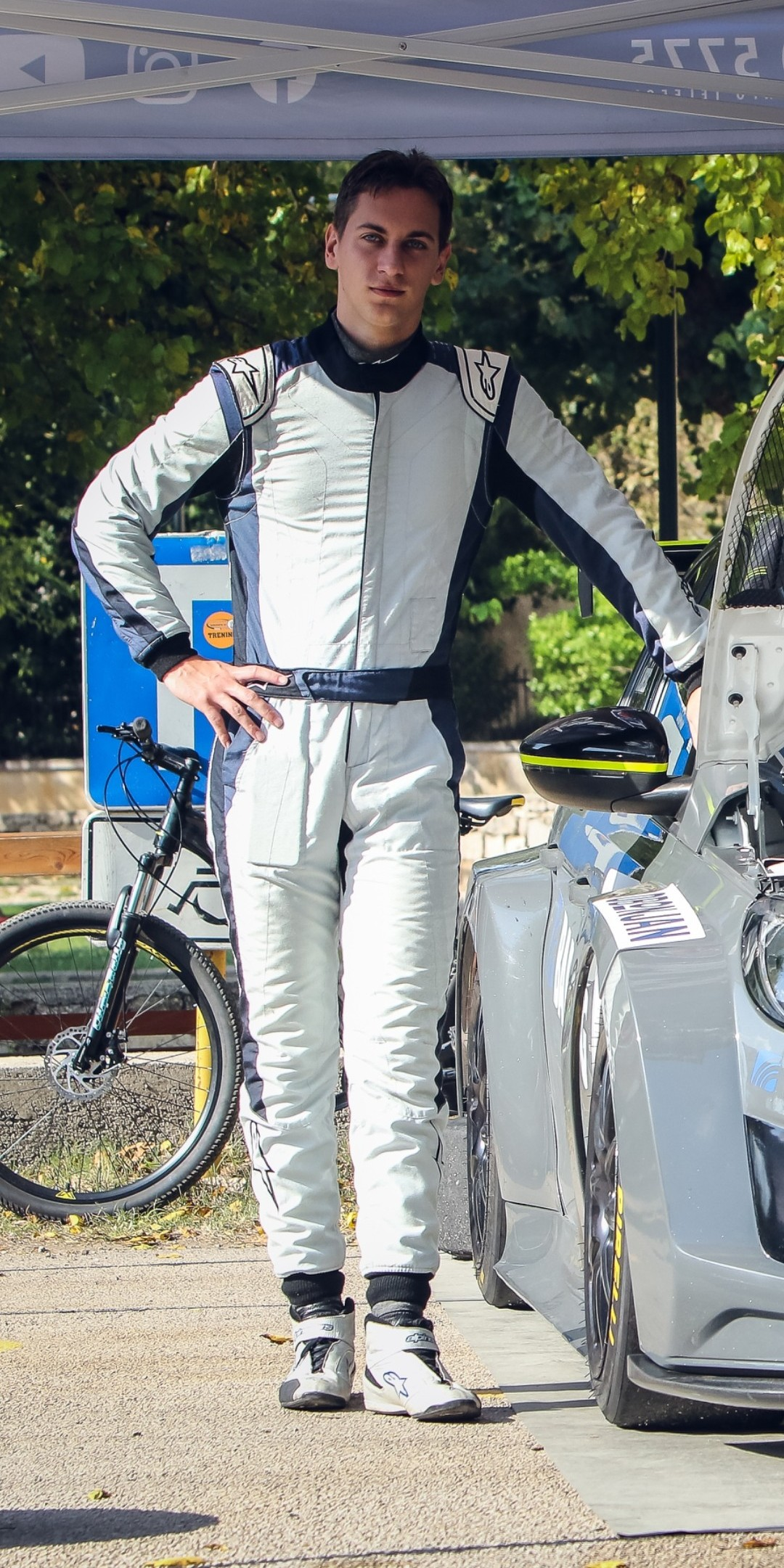
- Matija Jurišić – Skradin 2023
- Nationality: (Croatia) Croatian
- Born: April 21, 2003 (age 23) Rijeka, Croatia

European Hill Climb Championship career
- Categorisation: FIA Gold
- Years active: 2012–
- Best finish: 1st in 2024

Championship titles
- 2024-2025 2024 2020-2022 2020: European Hill Climb Champion – Group 4 European Hill Climb Champion; Croatian Hill Climb Champion; Croatian Time Trial Champion

Matija Jurišić (born 21 April 2003) is a Croatian racing driver and the 2024 FIA European Hill Climb Champion. He is a multiple-time Croatian national champion and an FIA Gold-graded driver. Jurišić has competed internationally in hill climb racing and touring car competition, holding multiple track records in the FIA European Hill Climb Championship.

== Career ==
=== Karting ===
Jurišić began racing in karting at the age of eight and competed in international events across Europe. During his karting career he raced against drivers including Oscar Piastri, Gabriel Bortoleto and Malthe Jakobsen.

=== Hill climb racing ===
Jurišić moved into car racing in hill climb competition, where he achieved success at both national and international level. In 2024, he won the FIA European Hill Climb Championship, becoming one of the few Croatian drivers to win an FIA European title in motorsport.
