= Falperra International Hill Climb =

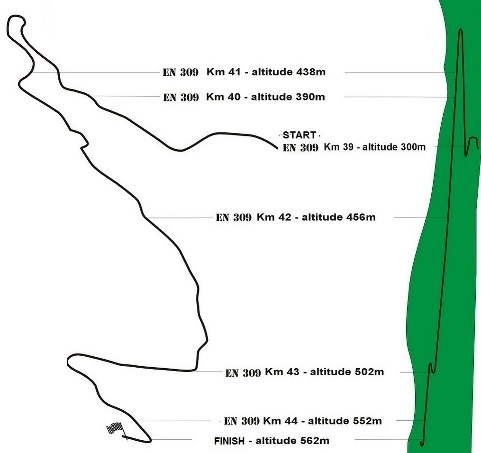
- Location: Braga, Portugal; 41.53274 N, 8.394082 W
- First race: 1927
- Distance: 5200 m
- Most wins (driver): (Italy) Simone Faggioli (6)

Circuit information
- Surface: Tarmac
- Lap record: 1:46.944 ( (Italy) Christian Merli, Osella FA 30, 2019, Cat. II (D/E2-SS))

The Falperra International Hill Climb, is an annual automobile hillclimb to the summit of Falperra in Braga, Portugal. The track measures 5.2 kilometres (3.2 mi), climbing 262 m (860 ft) from the start at km 39 on EN 309 Highway, to the finish at km 44,20, on grades averaging 5%.

The race is on the FIA European Hill Climb Championship Events Calendar and features on both Portugal and Spain National Hill Climb Championships. It has taken place since 1927, being the most popular Hill Climb race in Portugal, with 200.000 spectators per edition. It is currently contested by a variety of classes of cars, (touring cars, sportscars, single-seaters) and has on average 250 competitors.

== History ==
The first running of the Falperra Hill Climb was promoted by a local commission from Braga in 1927. The second edition has held in 1930 by the Automóvel Clube de Portugal, ACP (Portugal Automobile Association).

The competition was resumed in 1950 by the ACP, who named the 1950 edition as Falperra First Hill Climb, and all subsequent editions are accounted from the 1950 event onwards.

In 1976, the Automóvel Clube do Minho (Minho Automobile Association) assumed the organization of the race and applied for international competition status. FIA integrated the event in their European Championship in 1978. Since then, all of the Falperra Hill Climbs were part of an FIA international calendar with the exception of the first race of 1984, in which there were two races that year: one in May for the national championship, and another in September for the European Championship.

In 2002, due to a lack of understanding between local authorities on how to improve track safety, the event wasn't held until 2010, the year in which those improvements were implemented.

In 2013, the event was in risk of not being held again, but due to pressure applied by the Falperra HC supporters in social networks, the Braga city hall implemented the safety improvements requested by FIA that same year.

Falperra International Hill Climb was chosen by FIA to receive the FIA Hill Climb Masters in 2020, but due to COVID-19 pandemic concerns, the event was postponed until 2021. The track was shortened to 2970 m just for the Masters.

=== Current records ===
The current record was set in 2019 by Italian driver Christian Merli, at the wheel of an Osella FA 30, with the time of 1:46.944, beating the record established by himself in the previous year of 1:47.890, also at the wheel of the same Osella FA 30.

== Winners ==
Before Automóvel Clube do Minho organization
Edition	Year	Driver	Car	Promoter
1st	1927	(Portugal) Alfredo Marinho Júnior		Braga Commission
2nd	1931	(Portugal) Alfredo Marinho Júnior		Automóvel Clube de Portugal
1st	1950	(Portugal) José Cabral	Allard	Automóvel Clube de Portugal
2nd	1951	(Portugal) Conde de Monte Real	Ford	Automóvel Clube de Portugal
3rd	1960	(Portugal) José Lampreia	Triumph	Estrela e Vigorosa Sport
Promotion by Automóvel Clube do Minho
Edition	Year	Driver	Car	Time
4th	1976	(Portugal) Clemente Ribeiro da Silva	Opel	2.34.25
5th	1977	(Portugal) Mário Silva	Ford	2.31.74
6th	1978	(Portugal) António Barros	Opel	2.32.89
7th	1979	(Spain) Alberto González	SEAT	2.21.55
8th	1980	(Portugal) António Barros	Porsche	2.18.81
9th	1981	(Portugal) Joaquim Moutinho	Porsche	2.17.68
10th	1982	(Spain) Alberto González	SEAT	2.21.68
11th	1983	(Spain) Alberto González	SEAT	2.17.66
12th	1984	(Portugal) Mário Silva	BMW M1	2.16.16
13th	1984	(Portugal) António Rodrigues	Lancia 037	2.16.73
14th	1985	(Italy) Mauro Nesti	Osella BMW	4.10.719^{1}
15th	1986	(Italy) Mauro Nesti	Osella BMW	4.10.804^{1}
16th	1987	(Italy) Mauro Nesti	Osella C	4.09.277^{1}
17th	1988	(Italy) Mauro Nesti	Osella C	4.07.422^{1}
18th	1989	(Spain) Andrés Vilariño	Lola T298	4.07.323^{1}
19th	1990	(Spain) Andrés Vilariño	Lola T298 Repsol	4.34.947^{1}
20th	1991	(Spain) Andrés Vilariño	Lola T298 BMW	4.02.336^{1}
21st	1992	(Spain) Andrés Vilariño	Lola T298 BMW	4.01.205^{1}
22nd	1993	(Germany) Rüdiger Faustmann	Faust BMW	4.00.014^{1}
23rd	1994	(Spain) Francisco Egozkue	Osella PA9	4.30.694^{1}
24th	1995	(Germany) Rüdiger Faustmann	Faust BMW	3.56.024^{1}
25th	1996	(Italy) Fabio Danti	Osella BMW	4.57.543^{1}
26th	1997	(Germany) Rüdiger Faustmann	Remus Faust Opel	4.21.312^{1}
27th	1998	(Italy) Irlando Pasquale	Osella PA20	4.01.104^{1}
28th	1999	(Italy) Franz Tschager	Lucchini BMW	4.40.585^{1}
29th	2000	(Italy) Franz Tschager	Osella BMW	3.55.300^{1}
30th	2001	(Italy) Franz Tschager	Osella BMW	4.07.600^{1}
2002–-2009: not held
31st	2010	(Spain) Andrés Vilariño	Norma M20	2.05.906
32nd	2011	(Italy) Fausto Bormolini	Reynard K02	1.57.754
33rd	2012	(Italy) Simone Faggioli	Osella FA 30	1.56.900
34th	2013	(Italy) Simone Faggioli	Osella FA 30	1.51.365
35th	2014	(Italy) Simone Faggioli	Norma M20 FC	1.50.386
36th	2015	(Italy) Simone Faggioli	Norma M20 FC	1.49.364
37th^{2}	2016	(Portugal) Pedro Salvador	Norma M20 FC	4.38.153^{1}
38th	2017	(Italy) Simone Faggioli	Norma M20 FC	1.48.686
39th	2018	(Italy) Simone Faggioli	Norma M20 FC	3.38.219^{1}
40th	2019	(Italy) Christian Merli	Osella FA 30 Zytek	3:35.013^{1}
Masters	2021	(Italy) Christian Merli	Osella FA 30 Zytek	1:02.033^{3}
41st	2022	(Italy) Christian Merli	Osella FA 30 Zytek	3:34.505^{1}
42nd	2023	(Italy) Christian Merli	Osella FA 30 Judd LRM	3:37.848^{1}
43rd	2024	(Italy) Christian Merli	Osella FA 30 Judd LRM	3:39.866^{1}
44th	2025	(Italy) Christian Merli	Nova Proto NP01	4:07.116^{1}
45th	2026	(Spain) Joseba Iraola Lanzagorta	Nova Proto NP01	3:43.495^{1}

International Event
- ^1 — Cumulative time of the 2 best heats.
- ^2 — The principal contestants from European Championship withdrew due to heavy rain.
- ^3 — The edition of 2021 received the FIA Hill Climb Masters and the track was shortened to 2970m.

=== Multiple wins ===
Drivers
Wins	Driver
6	(Italy) Simone Faggioli
6	(Italy) Christian Merli
5	(Spain) Andrés Vilariño
4	(Italy) Mauro Nesti
3	(Spain) Alberto González
3	(Germany) Rüdiger Faustmann
3	(Italy) Franz Tschager
2	(Portugal) Alfredo Marinho Júnior
2	(Portugal) Mário Silva
2	(Portugal) António Barros

Manufacturers
Wins	Manufacturer
16	(Italy) Osella
8	(France) Norma/Nova Proto
4	(United Kingdom) Lola
3	(Spain) SEAT
3	(Germany) Faust
2	(United States) Ford
2	(Germany) Opel
2	(Germany) Porsche

== See also ==
- European Hill Climb Championship
- Hillclimbing
- Mont Ventoux Hill Climb
- Pikes Peak International Hill Climb
