= Unbounce =

Software company

- Industry: Software
- Founded: 2009
- Founder: Rick Perreault
- Headquarters: Vancouver, British Columbia
- Number of employees: 182 (2020)
- Website: unbounce.com

Unbounce is a Canadian software company headquartered in Vancouver. The company produces landing pages for websites, and is the host of the annual Call to Action Conference.

== History ==
The company was founded in 2009 by CEO Rick Perreault and five co-founders in Vancouver, British Columbia. Unbounce landing pages are designed for specific advertisements, and often ask the web visitor for their contact information in exchange for a piece of content, such as an e-book. The software was launched in 2010 along with the Unbounce blog, which was written by co-founder Oli Gardner. In 2012 the company raised about $1 million in an initial group investment.

In 2014 the company opened a second office in Montreal, Quebec, by which time it had begun doing business in Europe, Australia, and South America, in addition to Canada and the US. The company also began producing webinars, podcasts, and web series, where various landing pages are compared and judged against one another.

The company also hosts the Call to Action Conference for industry professionals. In 2016 the company opened an office in Berlin, Germany, and was ranked the 14th-fastest growing tech company in Canada. In 2017 the company introduced Convertables, a series of website advertisements designed by the platform's users to appear at varying points in a web browser's exploration. The company provides a flexible workplace for its employees, with many working remotely at least some of the time. It also uses artificial intelligence and machine learning to determine which landing pages work better than others. Its free Landing Page Analyzer, released in November 2017, uses this process to determine the reason behind landing page performance.
