= Mauro Nesti =

Mauro Nesti (12 August 1935 – 13 November 2013) was an Italian racecar driver, specializing in time trials on prototype sports cars. During his career he won the European title 9 times and the Italian title 17 times, winning a total of over 450 car races. His victories earned him the nickname "king of the mountains".

== Biography ==
Born in San Marcello Pistoiese, he began his career, not yet twenty, in motorcycle racing. In 1953, he participated in the Italian Speed Championship in the 125cc and 250cc classes aboard a MV Agusta. In 1955, the MV chose him as lead racer, but a tragic accident at the 24 Hours of Le Mans forced him to cease all European motorcycle racing. In the 1960s, he switched to automobile racing. In 1963, he participated in the Italian Speed Championship in an Abarth 850 lent by his cousin. He also participated in several Italian Formula 3 championships.

In the early-1970s, limited finances nearly forced him into early retirement. However, a company sponsor believed in him and their contribution afforded him a Chevron 2000, with which he won a time trial at the 1972 Cronoscalata Cesana-Sestriere.

== Awards ==
- Nine European Hill Climb Championships (1975, 1976, 1977, 1983, 1984, 1985, 1986, 1987, 1988)
- Four vice-European Hill Climb Championships (1973, 1974, 1978, 1979)
- 17 Campionato Italiano Velocità Montagna titles
