= Osella PA20 =

Prototype race car

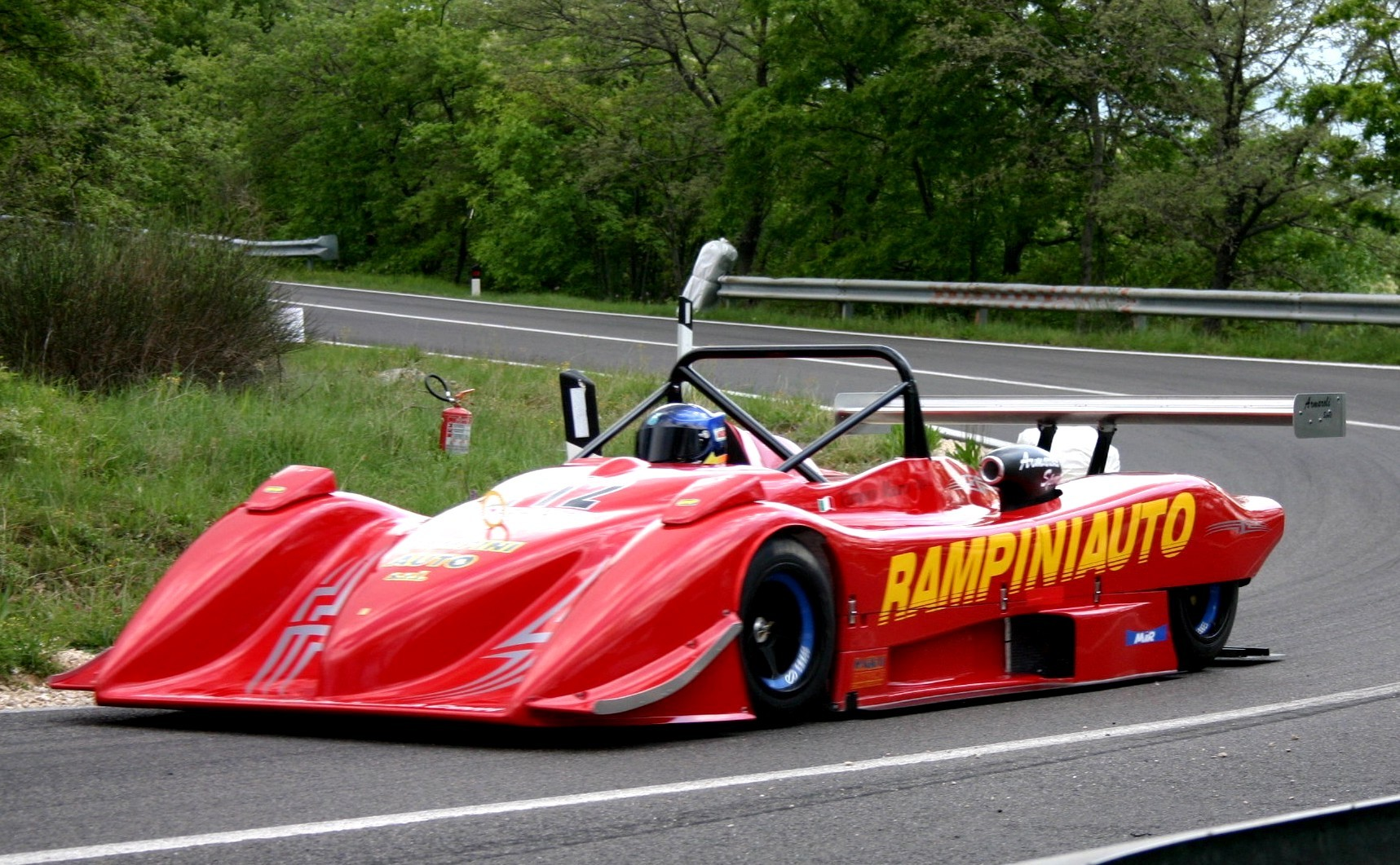
- Category: Group CN
- Constructor: Osella
- Production: 1994-2003

Technical specifications
- Chassis: Fiberglass aluminum monocoque with steel tubular rear subframe
- Suspension (front): Double wishbones, coil springs over dampers, anti-roll bar
- Suspension (rear): Single top links, twin lower links, twin radius arms, coil springs over dampers, anti-roll bar
- Engine: BMW S50B30 3.0 L (180 cu in) I6
- Transmission: Hewland F.T.200 5-speed sequential, rear wheel drive
- Power: 370–400 hp (280–300 kW)
- Weight: 605 kg (1,334 lb)

Competition history
Entries	Wins	Podiums
28	2	4

The Osella PA20 and Osella PA20/S are Group CN sports prototype race cars, designed, developed and built by Italian manufacturer Osella; which was first made in 1994. As per the Group CN rules of a displacement being no larger than 3.0 L (180 cu in), it is powered by a specially tuned and modified naturally-aspirated BMW S50B30 straight-six engine, producing between 370–400 hp (280–300 kW), and is capable of revving over 10,000 rpm. It weighs 605 kg (1,334 lb). It has competed mostly in timed hillcimb events and trials, but in its road racing career, it scored a total of 2 race wins, 4 podium finishes. It was briefly converted to a WSC, to comply with the FIA's regulations.
