= Osella PA2000 =

Prototype race car

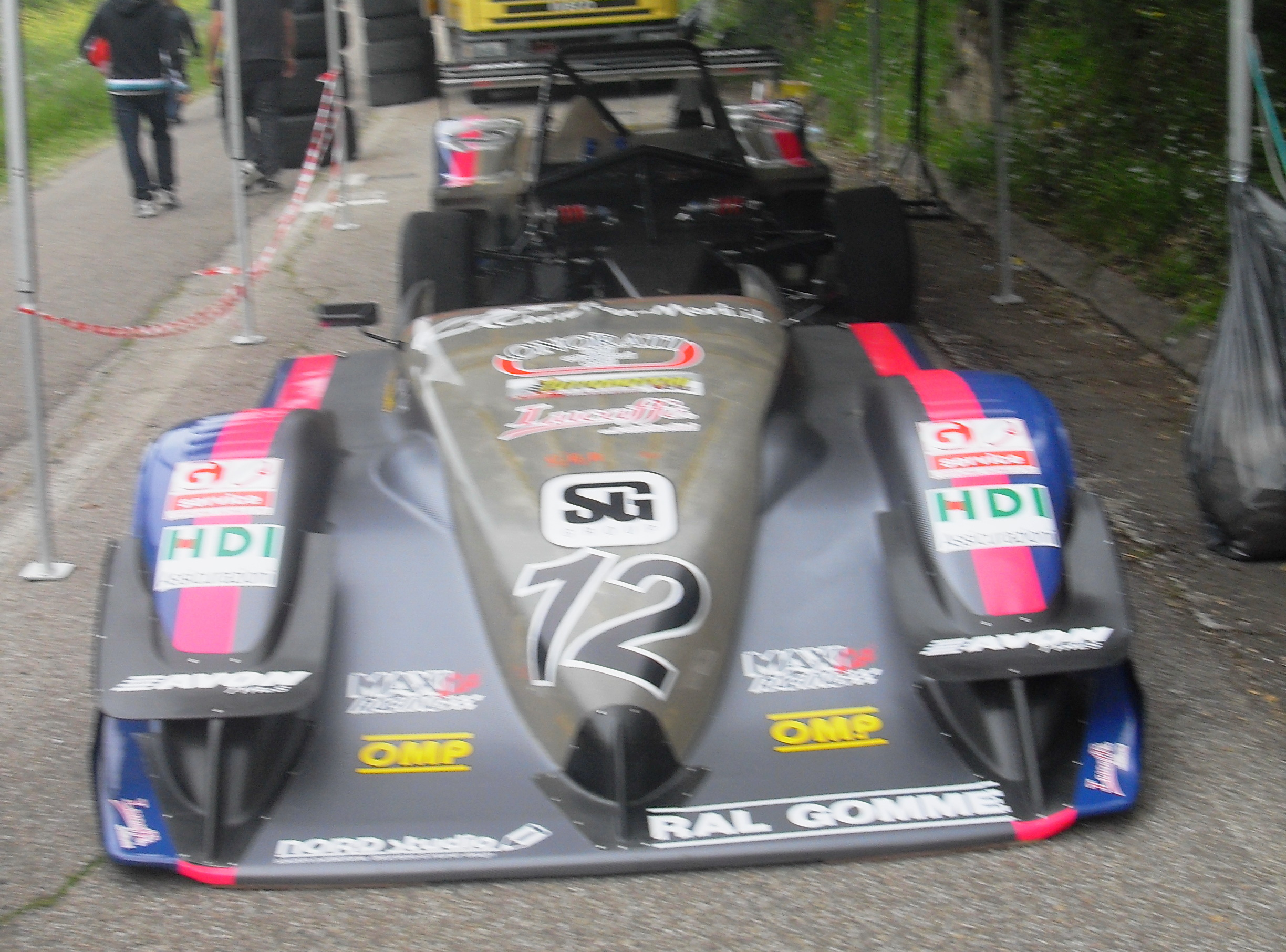
- Constructor: Osella

Technical specifications
- Chassis: Steel tube-frame, fibreglass body panels
- Suspension (front): Double wishbones, push-rod, coil springs over dampers, anti-roll bar
- Suspension (rear): Double wishbones, push-rod, coil springs over dampers, anti-roll bar
- Width: 2,000 mm (79 in)
- Engine: Honda K20 I4 N/A
- Transmission: Sadev SL-75 6-speed sequential semi-automatic, mid-engined, rear wheel drive
- Power: 320 hp (240 kW)
- Weight: 476 kg (1,049 lb)

Competition history

The Osella PA2000 is a ground effect sports prototype race car, designed, developed and built by Italian manufacturer Osella, specifically for competing in hillclimb racing.
