= Osella FA30 =

Prototype race car

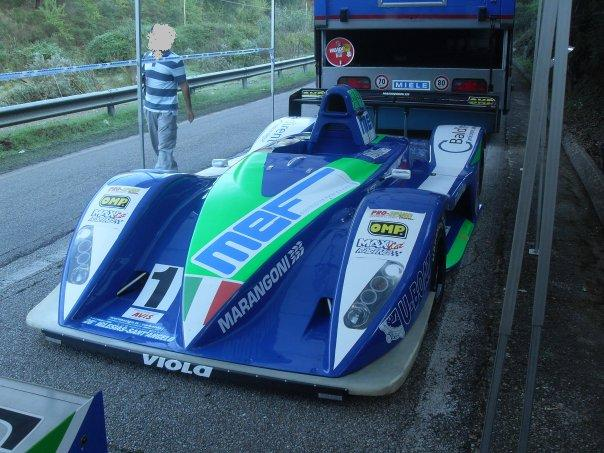
- Constructor: Osella

Technical specifications
- Chassis: Steel tube-frame, carbon fiber body panels
- Suspension (front): Double wishbones, push-rod, coil springs over dampers, anti-roll bar
- Suspension (rear): Double wishbones, push-rod, coil springs over dampers, anti-roll bar
- Length: 4,500 mm (180 in)
- Width: 2,000 mm (79 in)
- Wheelbase: 2,640 mm (104 in)
- Engine: Zytek (Judd KV) 3.0 L (180 cu in) V8
- Transmission: Sadev SL-75 6-speed sequential semi-automatic, mid-engined, rear wheel drive
- Power: > 450 hp (340 kW)
- Weight: 575 kg (1,268 lb)

Competition history

The Osella FA30 is a ground effect sports prototype race car, designed, developed and built by Italian manufacturer Osella, made specifically for timed hillcimb racing. It is powered by a naturally-aspirated 3.0 L (180 cu in) Zytek (Judd KV) ex-Formula 3000 V8 engine, making around 475 hp (354 kW).

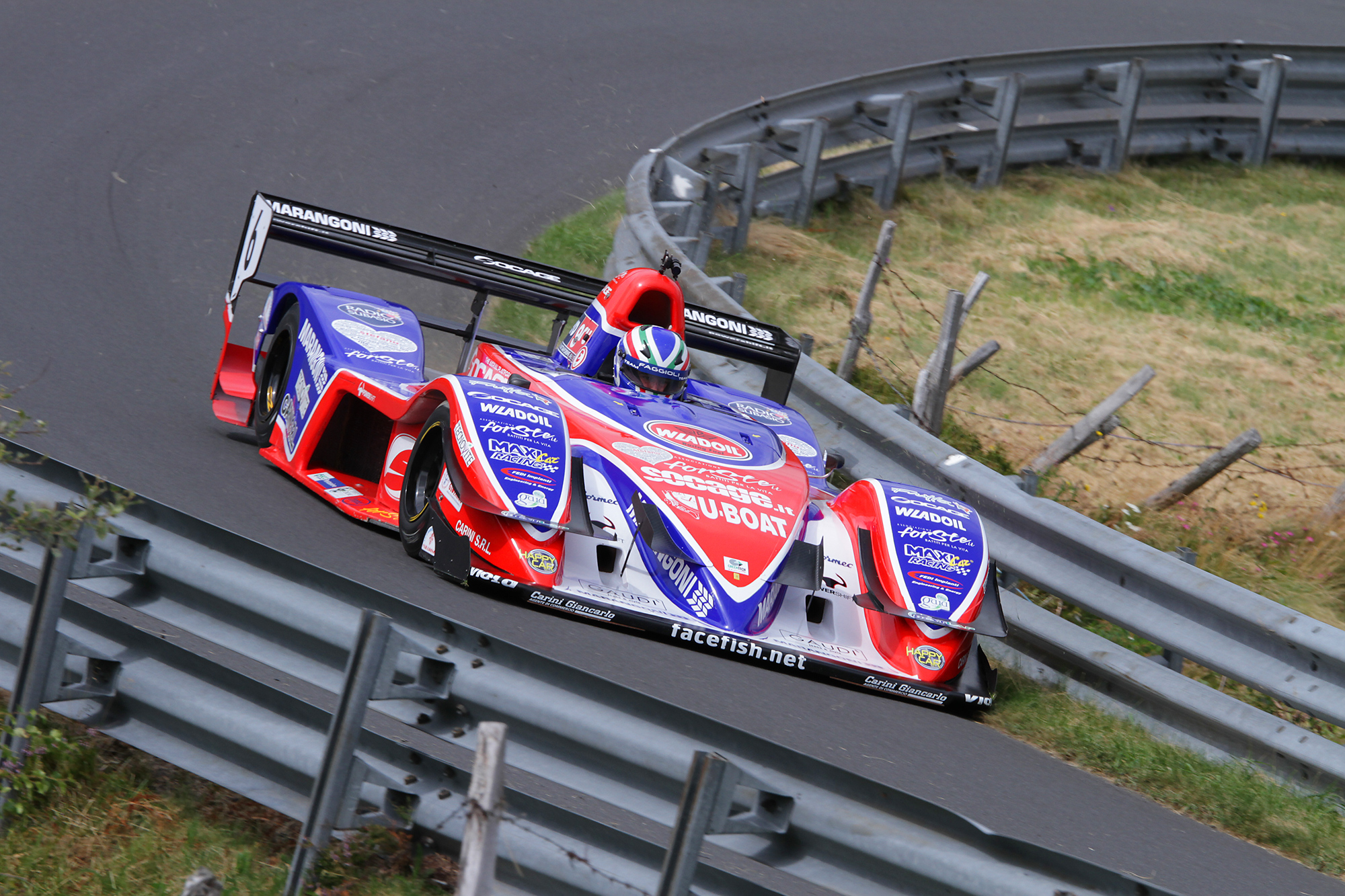

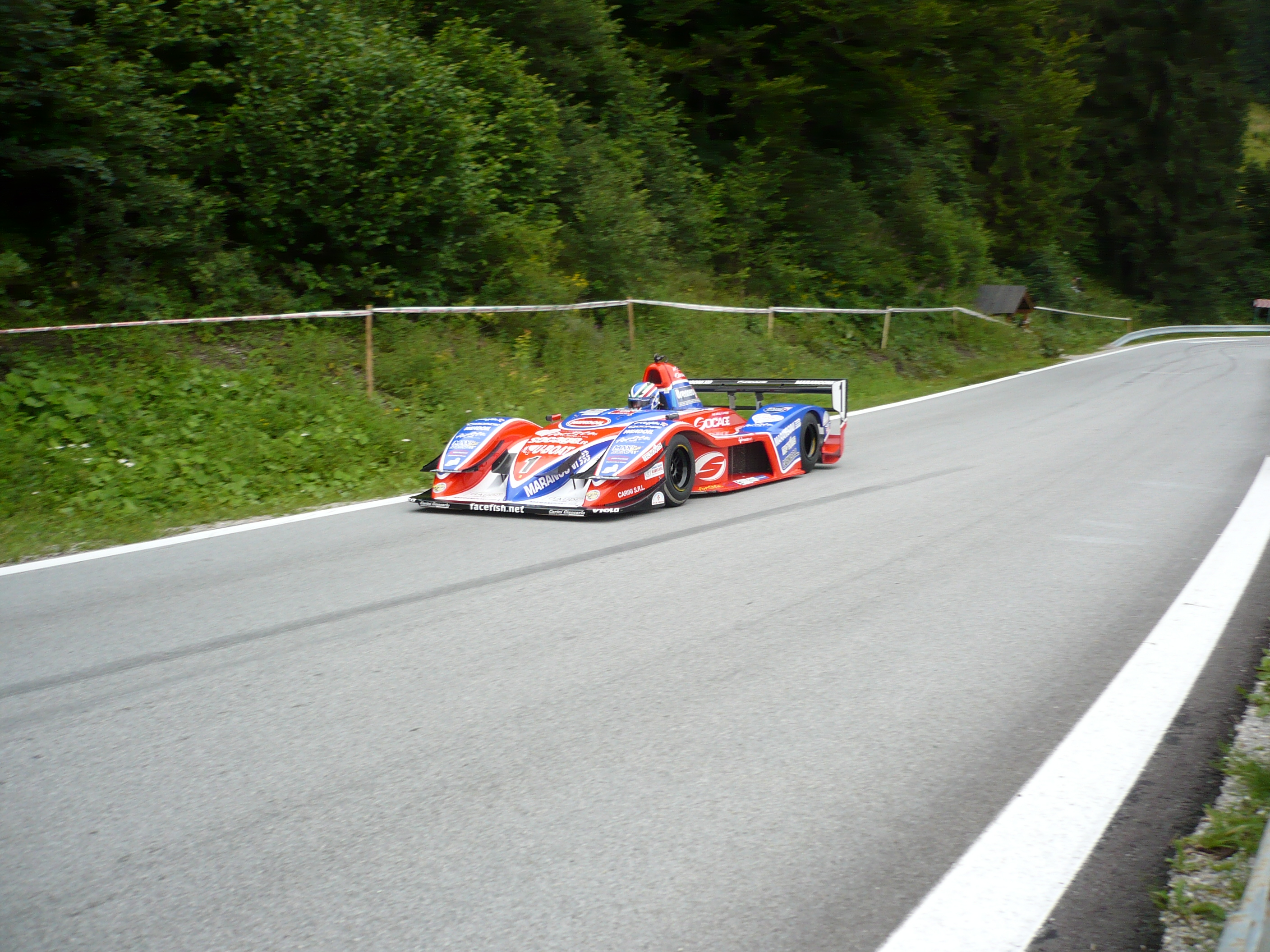
