= Mont Ventoux Hill Climb =

Mont Ventoux Hill Climb is a car and motorcycle hillclimbing race course near Avignon in France. The course, up Mont Ventoux, starts from the village of Bédoin and rises 1,612 metres (5,289 ft) for 21.6 kilometres (13.4 miles), to the observatory at the summit, for an average gradient of 7.4%.

In 1970: "Andre Willem of Belgium was killed June 20 in practice for the Mont Ventoux Hill Climb near Carpentras. His Lotus Formula 3 car slid off the road and struck a tree."

A shortened version of the course was used in 1976. A revival meeting called "Ronde du Ventoux" was held in 2009.

== Winners of the Mont Ventoux Hill Climb ==
Year	Driver	Vehicle	Time	Speed	Notes
1902	(France) Paul Chauchard	Panhard et Levassor 70 HP	27m 17s.		
1903	(France) Denjean	Richard-Brasier 40 HP	25m 25s.		
1904	(France) Henri Rougier	Turcat-Méry	21m 12.6s		
1905	(Italy) Alessandro Cagno	Fiat	19m 30s.		
1906	(France) Collomb	Rochet-Schneider	24m 40s.		Sept 15/16.
1907	(France) Henri Rougier	Lorraine-Dietrich	20m 14s.		Sept 14/15.
1908	(France) Paul Bablot	Brasier 120 HP	19m 8.8s.		
1909	(France) Paul Bablot	Brasier 120 HP	18m 41s.		
1910	(France) Georges Boillot	Peugeot Lion	21m 30.4s.		
1911	(France) Georges Deydier	Cottin et Desgouttes	21m 10.6s.	65.598 km/h	
1912	(France) Georges Boillot	Peugeot L76	17m 46s.		
1913	(France) Georges Boillot	Peugeot	17m 38s.		
1921	(France) Paul Bablot	Voisin 3L	20m 27.6s.		
1922	(France) René Thomas	Delage Sprint	18m 58s.		
1923	(France) René Thomas	Delage Sprint	18m 18s.		
1924	(France) Albert Divo	Delage DH	18m 17.8s.		
1925	(France) Albert Divo	Delage Sprint II	17m 23.2s.		
1926 No event.
1927	(France) Jourdan	Salmson 1100	19m 52.6s		
1928	(France) René Lamy	Bugatti T35C	16m 45.2s		
1929	(France) Marcel Lanciano	Bugatti T37A	18m 38.4.s		
1930	(France) Pierre Rey	Bugatti T35C	17m 38s.		
1931	(Germany) Rudolf Caracciola	Mercedes-Benz SSKL	15m 22s.		
1932	(Germany) Rudolf Caracciola	Alfa Romeo Monza	15m 12.4s.		
1933	(United Kingdom) Whitney Straight	Maserati 8CM	14m 31.6s.		
1934	(Germany) Hans Von Stuck	Auto Union Type A	13m 38.8s.		Sept 16.
1935 Cancelled.
1936	(France) René Carrière	Delahaye 135	14m 52.4s.	87.135 km/h	
1947	(France) "Claude des Tages"	Cisitalia D46	16m 38.8s.	77.853 km/h	
1948	(France) Robert Manzon	Simca-Gordini T11	14m 30.4s.		
1949	(France) Maurice Trintignant	Simca-Gordini T11	14m 3.6s.	92.176 km/h	
1950	(France) Robert Manzon	Simca-Gordini T15	13m 21.4s	97.030 km/h	July 9.
1951 No event.
1952	(France) Robert Manzon	Simca-Gordini T15	13m 17.7s.	97.480 km/h	July 27.
1956	(France) Cotton	Mercedes-Benz	14m 1.6s.	92.395 km/h	July 29.
1957	(Switzerland) Willy Daetwyler	Maserati 200S	12m 39.5s	102.383 km/h	June 30.
1958	(France) Jean Behra	Porsche 1500RSK	12m 9.8s	106.549 km/h	June 29.
1959	(West Germany) Edgar Barth	Porsche RSK	12m 16.8s.		June 28.
1960	(France) Maurice Trintignant	Cooper T43-Climax	11m 51.8s.		June 12.
1961	(West Germany) Heini Walter	Porsche RS61	12m 9.8s.		June 25; 13.42 miles.
1962	(Italy) Ludovico Scarfiotti	Ferrari 196 SP	11m 28.8s.	112.521 km/h	June 17.
1963	(Switzerland) Heini Walter	Porsche RS	11m 50s.	109.521 km/h	June 23.
1964	(France) Maurice Trintignant	BRM P57	11m 17.2s.		June 14.
1965	(West Germany) Hans Herrmann	Abarth 2000 SP	11m 16.5s. R	114.944 km/h	
1966	(West Germany) Gerhard Mitter	Porsche Carrera 6	10m 44.0s. R		June 26; 21.6 km
1967	(West Germany) Rolf Stommelen	Porsche 910 Bergspyder	10m 53.9s.		June 18.
1968	(West Germany) Gerhard Mitter	Porsche 910 Bergspyder	10m 12.1s.		Sept 22.
1969	(Switzerland) Peter Schetty	Ferrari 212 E Montagna	10m 0.5s. R	129.492 km/h	
1970	(Austria) Johannes Ortner	Abarth 3000	10m 4.8s.	128.571 km/h	
1971	(France) Jimmy Mieusset	Pygmée MDB15-Ford	10m 14.3s.		
1972	(Switzerland) Xavier Perrot	March 722-Ford	9m 51.5s.	131.552 km/h	
1973	(France) Jimmy Mieusset	March 722-Ford	9m 3.6s.		
1974 No event.
1975 No event.
1976	(France) Jimmy Mieusset	March 762-BMW	6m 11s.	149.163 km/h	(15.4 km)

Key: R = Course Record.

== See also ==
- European Hill Climb Championship
- Championnat de France de la Montagne
