= Pull-rod suspension =

Specialised automotive suspension system

Pull-rod suspension and push-rod suspension refer to a specialised type of automotive suspension system which is largely based on a double-wishbone system, incorporating elements of the commonly used MacPherson strut.

In cars, suspension refers to the system by which the vehicle maintains contact between all of its wheels and the ground. This is commonly achieved via use of dampers and springs, providing downward forces on the wheels to counteract impact shocks. However, in push-rod suspension systems, this strut is mounted across the chassis, parallel to the ground, as opposed to the perpendicular system commonly used. Push-rod suspension systems therefore allow essential components to be moved out of direct air flow, closer to the centre of gravity, and allow the centre of gravity to be lowered, thereby creating a more efficient distribution of weight and management of body roll.

As a result, push-rod suspension systems can provide a unique avenue for performance, albeit at the cost of everyday drivability, practicality and comfort. Because of this, push-rod suspension systems tend to see most widespread use in non-road based cars, being specialised instead for formula racing leagues, especially Formula One, but rarely are seen in production cars.

== History ==
In the 1960s, Brabham Automotive was the largest producer of open-wheel racing cars in the world, with several championship wins in Formula Two and Formula Three. Throughout the 1960s, and through to the 1980s, Brabham held a highly competitive rivalry with the Lotus and McLaren racing teams, creating a necessity for innovation in formula racing championships.

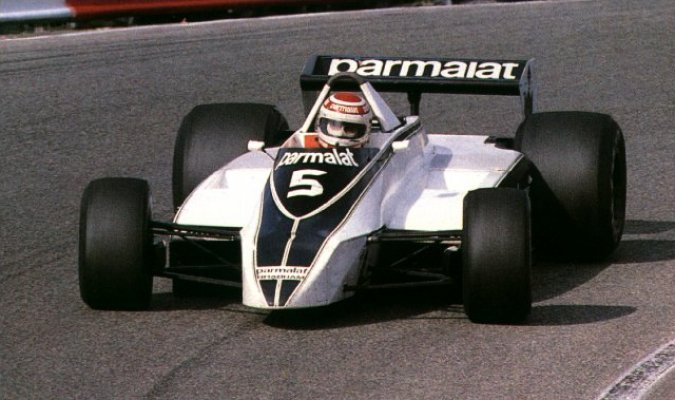
Brabham BT49

In 1979, engineer Gordon Murray, working under Brabham, debuted an innovative pull-rod suspension system on the Formula One stage, implementing the design into a BT49 racing car. This new design was revolutionary, as the shift away from the archaic hydro-pneumatic suspension used previously allowed for a much lower ride height and aerodynamic efficiency on the BT49, securing a championship win over four seasons from 1979 to 1982 for Brabham.

Over the next two decades, the popularity of pull-rod suspension on formula racing cars fluctuated, yet steadily increased, and was being driven largely by innovation and optimisation by those teams continuing to utilise it. However, there was a notable drop-off in usage of pull-rod suspension in formula racing from the mid 1990s to early 2000s due to changing formula racing regulations regarding ride height and aerodynamics as well as the changing priorities of racing teams in terms of performance goals.

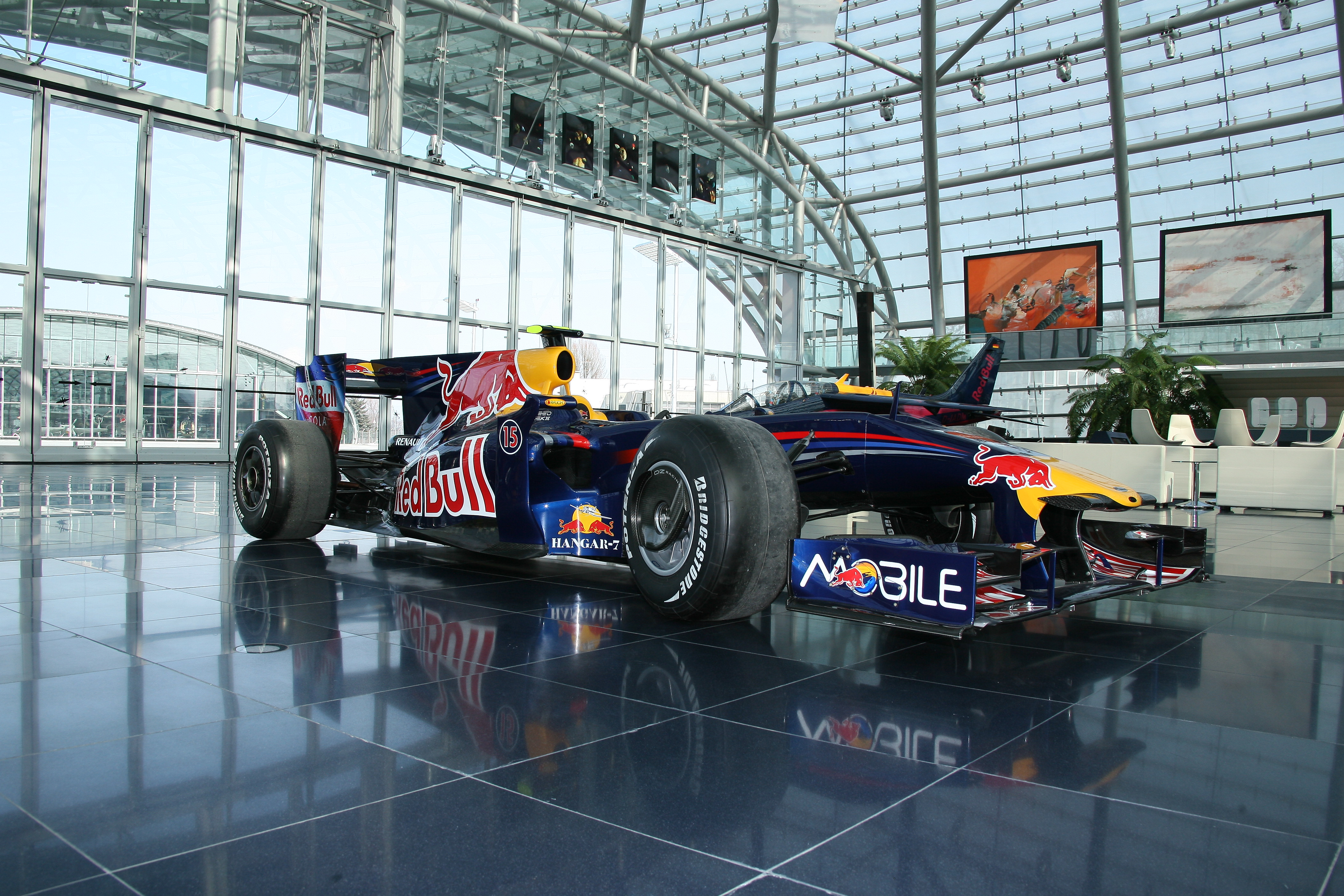
Red Bull Racing RB5

It would not be until 2009 that pull-rod suspension would see a resurgence in formula racing, where a new change to regulations stipulated that front wings may be wider, rear wings must be narrower and taller, and diffusers must be more tightly limited in size and shape. In response to this, Red Bull Racing chief technical officer, engineer, and aerodynamicist Adrian Newey saw a new niche arise for pull-rod suspension. As the RB5 race car's diffuser moved further towards the rear, he realised that pull-rod suspension would assist in optimising air flow under the vehicle and into its aerodynamic components. As a result, the revised RB5 used in the 2009 season secured a one-two victory in Shanghai, Abu Dhabi, and the British Grand Prix.

The pull-rod system has been adopted once again in the 2022 F1 season, after being last seen in 2015 on the Ferrari SF15-T, on the front suspensions of the Red Bull Racing RB18 and the McLaren MCL36.

== Design ==
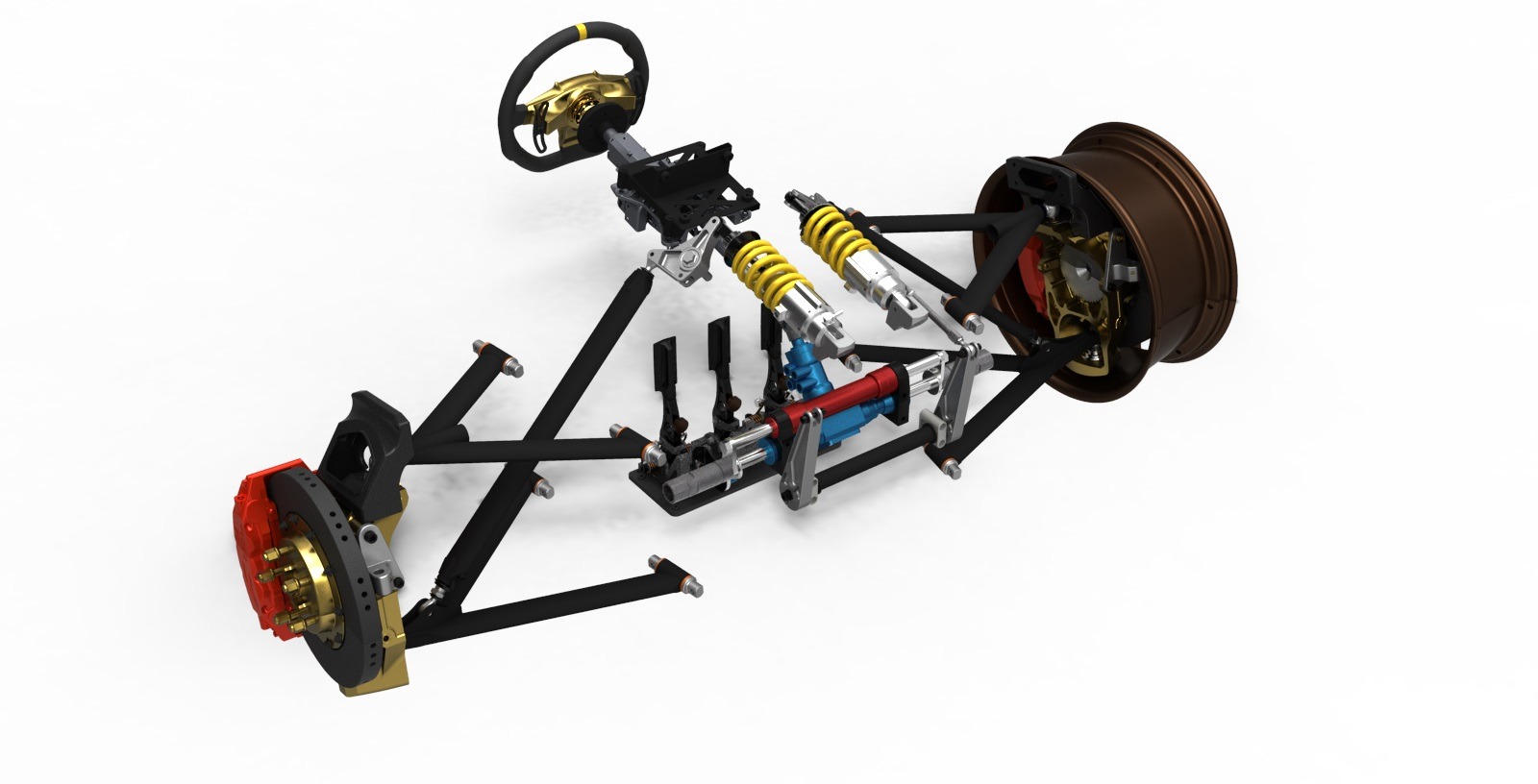
An example of a push-rod suspension setup (rocker arms are mounted at the top)

Push-rod and pull-rod suspension are similar yet distinct in design, with the main difference being the placement of the rocker arm that controls shock damping in relation to the upper control arm. In effect, this means that both push-rod and pull-rod systems are functionally the same design.

In a push-rod suspension system, there is an upper and lower control arm, similar in design to a double-wishbone frame, which provide a structurally integral connection between the wheel hubs and the chassis. These arms are able to pivot inwards towards the centre of the vehicle, meaning that as the wheels experience shocks from the ground, they move up and down.

Between these two wishbone control arms, the wheel hubs connect to a rigid ‘push rod’. Here, as the wheels move latitudinally, this rod will push upwards against an oscillating rocker arm, creating a ‘see-sawing’ motion that transfers latitudinal forces from the ground into longitudinal forces inwards towards the chassis.

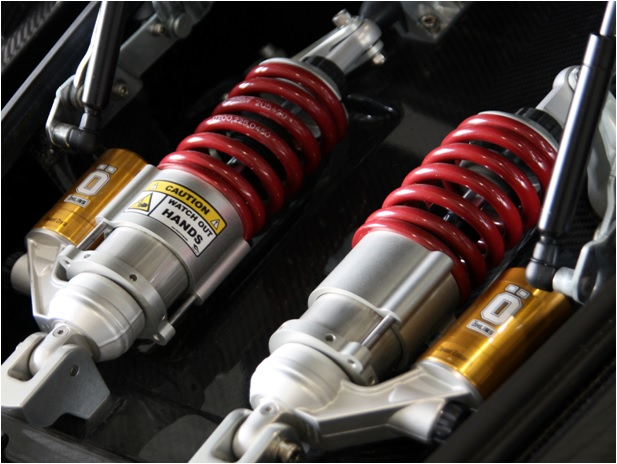
Shock-damping system

On the opposite end of this rocker arm is a transversely mounted shock-damping coil-over, similar in design to those MacPherson struts commonly found in production cars. Therefore, as the wheels move up and down in relation to the road, forces are transferred inwards towards the solid monocoque chassis, as opposed to upwards into the vehicle. As such, push-rod suspension systems allow for much greater high-speed stability, much lower levels of body-roll, and a much lower centre of gravity for the vehicle.

For pull-rod suspension systems, the only difference is the orientation of the rocker arms. In a push-rod system, the rocker arms are placed at the highest point in the assembly. As such, the rod is under pressure as it transfers compression forces upwards into the rocker arms. In a pull-rod system however, the rocker arms are located between the upper and lower control arms, at the centre of the assembly. As such, the rod is under tension as it pulls against the rocker arms.

Additionally, the steering mechanism in push-rod suspension systems is much different from conventional vehicles. In a conventional steering system, the steering wheel connects to a steering column, a form of ‘rack and pinion’ gear that translates rotational motion into linear motion, which turns the front wheels. In a push-rod suspension system, however, the steering is controlled by ball joints found at the ends of the control arms, which allow for the wheel hubs, and the car to turn.

As a result of these factors, the push-rod layout is distinct from other suspension systems as, unlike others, it is able to be designed and assembled with components closer to, or further from, the centre of gravity of the vehicle. As a result, engineers are able to optimise the performance of their vehicle in this area as they sacrifice comfort and practicality in favour of aerodynamics, handling, and stability on track.

== Advantages ==
The main advantages of a pull-rod suspension system on a track-focused race car have to do primarily with the ability to move suspension components closer to the ground, lower the chassis of the vehicle, and lower the centre of gravity to improve efficiency in cornering, body-roll, and high-speed stability.

For a race car to be optimised for formula racing or otherwise, the major areas of focus for engineers is how easily the vehicle is able to accelerate and achieve top speed, how effectively the vehicle is able to negotiate and channel the air around it, and how effectively the car's body is able to channel that air into its aerodynamic components to improve the cornering performance of the vehicle.

In formula racing leagues, regulations often stipulate that racing cars must utilise low-displacement, low-power engines with a lightweight chassis in order to shift the focus of the race away from engineering and towards driving capability. As a result of these smaller engines, specialised racing cars tend to be more sensitive to forces acting upon them, and minor increases in the amount of this drag, weight, and friction forces can have a much larger impact on the work-load and efficiency of the engine. Pull-rod suspension, being able to move components away from essential air channels, is therefore able to reduce the workload on the smaller engines and improve acceleration across the power band.

Another essential benefit of utilising pull-rod suspension when designing a car for formula racing is streamlining components to not only reduce drag, but also to improve downforce. Drag as a whole is an essential area of concern for any kind of racing car, as drag plays a direct role in determining the overall performance of the vehicle, not only reducing acceleration and top speed, but also creating turbulence and instability. With a conventional suspension system, shock dampers and other similar components are positioned underneath the vehicle, disturbing air around them and reducing the efficiency with which air is moved over and around the vehicle, generating substantial drag. However, pull-rod suspension moves the entire suspension assembly away from the underside of the vehicle, greatly improving the air-flow efficiency an essential air channel. The more efficiently air can pass over and around the body of the vehicle, the more effectively that air can be channelled into the car's splitters, diffusers, and wings to produce downforce. As downforce increases, the car becomes more forcefully planted into the track, improving tire grip and, by extension, cornering and stability performance.

Finally, when designing a specialised racing car, another important area of concern is cornering ability, as the faster a car is able to maintain grip in corners, the less time is spent braking and accelerating. When cornering, the two biggest limiting factors are downforce and body-roll. Body-roll occurs when the centripetal inertia forces experienced in cornering overload the shock dampers on the outside side of the vehicle, causing the body to ‘lean’, or roll to one side. In conventional suspension designs, having the shock dampers extend perpendicularly from the body creates an increased capacity for body-roll, as forces act directly upwards into the coils. In pull-rod suspension designs, however, having the wishbones and dampers mounted transversely and in line with the body instead translates these forces longitudinally, leaving less room for body-roll and greatly improving cornering grip. This also allows the centre of gravity of the vehicle to be lowered significantly, thereby satisfying both key elements of high-speed cornering ability.

Due to these reasons, push-rod suspension sees common and widespread usage in track-focused racing leagues as its benefits extend to many aspects of the overall vehicle's performance.

== Disadvantages ==
The main disadvantages of a push-rod suspension system have to do with overall cost, practicality, and manoeuvrability in daily usage for production cars.

Road-based production cars, unlike thoroughbred race cars, have a particular focus on comfort, usability, and practicality in daily life. For this reason, push-rod suspension rarely sees usage in production cars due to its many drawbacks and compromises.

One major drawback of push-rod suspension is the cost. In production model vehicles, it is most important for the company to remain profitable, and as such, the most cost effective designs are most commonly used. Due to its simplicity, systems such as leaf springs or the MacPherson strut can be relatively cheap to design and integrate into a vehicle, and their wide usability make them a popular choice for such cars. Push-rod suspension, however, features many moving parts working together in a complex system, resulting in not only in significantly higher costs, but also higher chances of breakage.

In terms of usability for daily use, while push-rod suspension is highly effective on a maintained and smoothed track, it does little to soften impacts and forces while driving on active roads, resulting in a rough and uncomfortable ride. This is largely due to the inefficiency in using a transversely mounted shock damper to mitigate vertical forces.

Pull-rod suspension systems often incorporate a large frame that extends beyond the body of the chassis, making a vehicle with this setup significantly harder to judge the dimensions of, making manoeuvring in traffic more difficult.

As a result, pull-rod suspension outside of specialised racing cars is often seen as impractical and unliveable for daily usage, and incorporation of pull-rod suspension in road based cars is rarely seen outside of certain exotic supercars such as the Lamborghini Murciélago concept.
