= European Hill Climb Championship =

FIA-run motorsport competition held across Europe

- Category: Hillclimbing
- Country: Europe
- Inaugural season: 1930
- Classes: Single-seater cars, Sports prototypes, Silhouettes and Touring cars
- Current champions: (Croatia) Matija Jurišić (Cat. I) (France) Geoffrey Schatz (Cat. II)
- Official website: http://www.fia.com/node/3586

The FIA European Hill Climb Championship (FIA EHC) is an FIA-run motorsport competition held across Europe on closed public road courses.

Unlike circuit racing, each driver competes alone, starting from a point at the base of a mountain and reaching a finish point near the summit. The European Championship allows single-seater cars, open-cockpit sports prototypes, and touring cars with varying degrees of technical preparation.

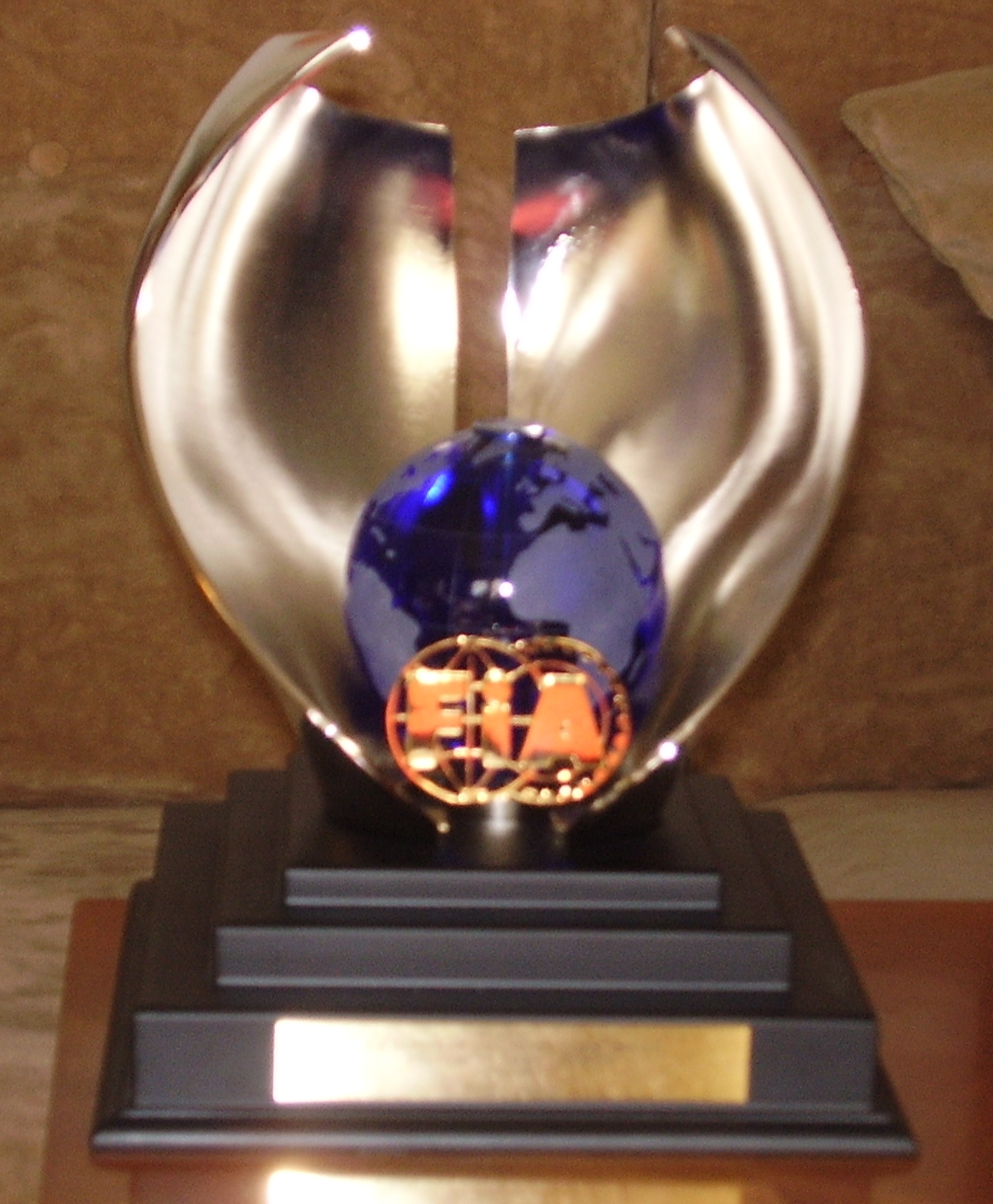
FIA-Cup for the winner of EHCC 2010

== 2026 calendar ==
Round	Venue	City	Country	Date
1	Hill Climb Rechberg	Rechberg	Austria	25-26 April 2026
2	Subida Internacional al Fito	Arriondas	Spain	9-10 May 2026
3	Falperra International Hill Climb	Braga	Portugal	16-17 May 2026
4	Ecce Homo Šternberk	Šternberk	Czech Republic	6-7 June 2026
5	Internationales Glasbachrennen	Bad Liebenstein	Germany	13-14 June 2026
6	Coppa Paolino Teodori	Colle San Marco	Italy	27-28 June 2026
7	Limanowa [pl]	Stara Wieś, Limanowa County	Poland	18-19 July 2026
8	St Ursanne - Les Rangiers	St Ursanne	Switzerland	15-16 August 2026
9	Ilirska Bistrica	Ilirska Bistrica	Slovenia	29-30 August 2026
10	Buzetski Dani	Buzet	Croatia	19-20 September 2026

== Groups and classes since 2020 ==
Since 2020 - Performance Factor

Category 1
Group	Class	PF
Group 1	Single class	Pf 15 to 39
Group 2	Class 2a	Pf 40 to 59
Group 2	Class 2b	Pf 69 to 79
Group 3	Class 3a	Pf 80 to 99
Group 3	Class 3b	Pf 100 to 119
Group 4	Class 4a	Pf 120 to 139
Group 4	Class 4b	Pf 140 to 159
Group 5	Class 5a	Pf 160 to 199
Group 5	Class 5b	Pf > 199

Category 2
Group
D/E2-SS (Single-seater)
CN/E2-SC (Sports car)

== European Hill Climb Champions 1957–2023 ==
For the two categories, the FIA awards the titles:

- European Hill Climb Champion for Production Cars
- European Hill Climb Champion for Competition Cars

Additionally, the first driver of the first group to which the European Champion does not belong, will be declared:

- Winner of the FIA Hill Climb Trophy for Production Cars
- Winner of the FIA Hill Climb Trophy for Competition Cars

Season	Class	Driver	Car
2025	EHCC (Cat. I)	(Italy) Antonino Migliuolo	Mitsubishi Lancer Evolution IX
2025	EHCC (Cat. II)	(Italy) Christian Merli	Nova Proto NP01
2024	EHCC (Cat. I)	(Croatia) Matija Jurišić	Peugeot 308 TCR 1.6
2024	EHCC (Cat. II)	(France) Geoffrey Schatz	Nova Proto NP01
2023	EHCC (Cat. I)	(North Macedonia) Igor Stefanovski	Hyundai i30 N TCR (Gr. 3)
2023	EHCC (Cat. II)	(Italy) Christian Merli	Osella FA30 (Gr. E2-SS)
2022	EHCC (Cat. I)	(Montenegro) Vasilije Jaksic	Mitsubishi Lancer Evo IX RS (Gr. 4)
2022	EHCC (Cat. II)	(Italy) Christian Merli	Osella FA30 (Gr. E2-SS)
2021	EHCC (Cat. I)	(Italy) Antonino Migliuolo	Mitsubishi Lancer Evo IX (Gr. 3)
2021	EHCC (Cat. II)	(Italy) Christian Merli	Osella FA30 (Gr. E2-SS)
2020	Canceled due to COVID-19 Pandemic		
2019	EHCC (Cat. I)	(Czech Republic) Lukáš Vojáček	Subaru Impreza WRX (Gr. A)
2019	EHCC (Cat. II)	(Italy) Christian Merli	Osella FA30 (Gr. E2-SS)
2019	EHCC (Cat. II)	(Italy) Simone Faggioli	Norma M20 FC (Gr. E2-SC)
2018	EHCC (Cat. I)	(Czech Republic) Lukáš Vojáček	Subaru Impreza WRX (Gr. A)
2018	EHCC (Cat. II)	(Italy) Christian Merli	Osella FA30 (Gr. E2-SS)
2017	EHCC (Cat. I)	(Austria) Erich Weber "Tessitore"	Audi R8 LMS (Gr. GT)
2017	EHCC (Cat. II)	(Italy) Simone Faggioli	Norma M20 FC (Gr. E2-SC)
2016	EHCC (Cat. I)	(Serbia) Nikola Miljkovic	Mitsubishi Lancer Evo IX (Gr. N)
2016	EHCC (Cat. II)	(Italy) Simone Faggioli	Norma M20 FC (Gr. E2-SC)
2015	EHCC (Cat. I)	(North Macedonia) Igor Stefanovski	Mitsubishi Lancer Evo IX (Gr. N)
2015	EHCC (Cat. II)	(Italy) Simone Faggioli	Norma M20 FC (Gr. E2-SC)
2014	EHCC (Cat. I)	(North Macedonia) Igor Stefanovski	Mitsubishi Lancer Evo IX (Gr. N)
2014	EHCC (Cat. II)	(Italy) Simone Faggioli	Norma M20 FC (Gr. E2-SC)
2013	EHCC (Cat. I)	(Croatia) Tomislav Muhvić	Mitsubishi Lancer Evo IX (Gr. N)
2013	EHCC (Cat. II)	(Italy) Simone Faggioli	Osella FA30 (Gr. E2-SS)
2012	EHCC (Cat. I)	(Serbia) Dušan Borković	Mitsubishi Lancer Evo IX (Gr. N)
2012	EHCC (Cat. II)	(Italy) Simone Faggioli	Osella FA30 (Gr. E2-SS)
2011	EHCC (Cat. I)	(Slovenia) Aleš Prek	Mitsubishi Lancer Evo IX (Gr. N)
2011	EHCC (Cat. II)	(Italy) Simone Faggioli	Osella FA30 (Gr. E2-SS)
2010	EHCC (Cat. I)	(Germany) Roland Wanek	Mitsubishi Lancer Evo IX (Gr. N)
2010	EHCC (Cat. II)	(Italy) Simone Faggioli	Osella FA30 (Gr. E2M)
2009	EHCC (Cat. I)	(Czech Republic) Vaclav Janík	Mitsubishi Lancer Evo VIII (Gr. A)
2009	EHCC (Cat. II)	(Italy) Simone Faggioli	Osella FA30 (Gr. E2M)
2008	EHCC (Cat. I)	(Czech Republic) Miroslav Jakeš	Mitsubishi Lancer Evo IX (Gr. N)
2008	EHCC (Cat. II)	(France) Lionel Regal	Reynard 01L F3000 (Gr. E2)
2007	EHCC (Cat. I)	(Slovakia) Peter Jureňa	Mitsubishi Lancer Evo IX (Gr. N)
2007	EHCC (Cat. II)	(Spain) Ander Vilariño	Reynard 01L F3000 (Gr. E2)
2006	EHCC (Cat. I)	(Germany) Jörg Weidinger	BMW M3 (Gr. N)
2006	EHCC (Cat. II)	(Italy) Giulio Regosa	Lola Cosworth B99/50 F3000 (Gr. E2)
2005	EHCC (Cat. I)	(Germany) Jörg Weidinger	BMW M3 (Gr. N)
2005	EHCC (Cat. II)	(Italy) Simone Faggioli	Osella PA21S (Gr. CN2)
2004	EHCC (Cat. I)	(Czech Republic) Robert Šenkýř	BMW M3 (Gr. A)
2004	EHCC (Cat. II)	(Italy) Giulio Regosa	Osella PA20S BMW (Gr. CN)
2003	EHCC (Cat. I)	(Czech Republic) Robert Šenkýř	BMW M3 (Gr. A)
2003	EHCC (Cat. II)	(Italy) Denny Zardo	Osella PA20S BMW (Gr. CN)
2002	EHCC (Cat. I)	(Monaco) Piergiorgio Bedini	Ford Escort RS Cosworth (Gr. N)
2002	EHCC (Cat. II)	(Italy) Franz Tschager	Osella PA20S BMW (Gr. CN)
2001	EHCC (Cat. I)	(Croatia) Niko Pulić	BMW M3 (Gr. A)
2001	EHCC (Cat. II)	(Italy) Franz Tschager	Osella PA20S BMW (Gr. CN)
2000	EHCC (Cat. I)	(Croatia) Niko Pulić	BMW M3 (Gr. A)
2000	EHCC (Cat. II)	(Italy) Franz Tschager	Osella PA20S BMW (Gr. CN)
1999	EHCC (Cat. I)	(Croatia) Niko Pulić	BMW M3 (Gr. A)
1999	EHCC (Cat. II)	(Italy) Pasquale Irlando	Osella PA20S BMW (Gr. CN)
1998	EHCC (Cat. I)	(Czech Republic) Otakar Krámský	BMW M3 (Gr. A)
1998	EHCC (Cat. II)	(Italy) Pasquale Irlando	Osella PA20S BMW (Gr. CN)
1997	EHCC (Cat. I)	(Czech Republic) Otakar Krámský	BMW M3 (Gr. A)
1997	EHCC (Cat. II)	(Italy) Pasquale Irlando	Osella PA20S BMW (Gr. CN)
1996	EHCC (Cat. I)	(France) Bruno Houzelot	Ford Escort RS Cosworth (Gr. N)
1996	EHCC (Cat. II)	(Italy) Fabio Danti	Osella PA20S BMW (Gr. CN)
1995	EHCC (Cat. I)	(Czech Republic) Otakar Krámský	BMW M3 (Gr. A)
1995	EHCC (Cat. II)	(Italy) Fabio Danti	Lucchini P3-94M BMW (Gr. CN)
1994	EHCC (Cat. I)	(Czech Republic) Josef Kopecký	Ford Escort RS Cosworth (Gr. N)
1994	EHCC (Cat. II)	(Spain) Francisco Egózcue	Osella PA9/90 BMW (Gr. C3)
1993	EHCC (Cat. I)	(France) Francis Dosières	BMW M3 (Gr. A)
1993	EHCC (Cat. II)	(Spain) Francisco Egózcue	Osella PA9/90 BMW (Gr. C3)
1992	EHCC (Cat. I)	(France) Francis Dosieres	BMW M3 (Gr. A)
1992	EHCC (Cat. II)	(Spain) Andres Vilariño	Lola T298 Repsol (Gr. C3)
1991	EHCC (Cat. I)	(Spain) Iñaki Goiburu	BMW M3 (Gr. A)
1991	EHCC (Cat. II)	(Spain) Andres Vilariño	Lola T298 Repsol (Gr. C3)
1990	EHCC (Cat. I)	(France) Francis Dosieres	BMW M3 (Gr. A)
1990	EHCC (Cat. II)	(Spain) Andres Vilariño	Lola T298 Repsol (Gr. C3)
1989	EHCC (Cat. I)	(France) Francis Dosieres	BMW M3 (Gr. A)
1989	EHCC (Cat. II)	(Spain) Andres Vilariño	Lola T298 Repsol (Gr. C3)
1988	EHCC (Cat. I)	(France) Giovanni Rossi	Renault 5 Maxi Turbo (Gr. B)
1988	EHCC (Cat. II)	(Italy) Mauro Nesti	Osella PA9 BMW (Gr. C3)
1987	EHCC (Cat. I)	(Switzerland) Claude-François Jeanneret	Audi Quattro A2 (Gr. B)
1987	EHCC (Cat. II)	(Italy) Mauro Nesti	Osella PA9 BMW (Gr. C3)
1986	EHCC (Cat. I)	(Switzerland) Claude-François Jeanneret	Audi Quattro A2 (Gr. B)
1986	EHCC (Cat. II)	(Italy) Mauro Nesti	Osella PA9 BMW (Gr. 6)
1985	EHCC (Cat. I)	(France) Francis Dosieres	BMW 635 CSi (Gr. A)
1985	EHCC (Cat. II)	(Italy) Mauro Nesti	Osella PA9 BMW (Gr. 6)
1984	EHCC (Serial Car)	(France) Giovanni Rossi	BMW M1 (Gr. B)
1984	EHCC (Sports Car)	(West Germany) Rolf Göring	BMW M1 (Gr. B)
1984	EHCC (Racing Car)	(Italy) Mauro Nesti	Osella PA9 BMW (Gr. 6)
1983	EHCC (Serial Car)	(France) Giovanni Rossi	BMW 528i (Gr. A)
1983	EHCC (Sports Car)	(West Germany) Rolf Göring	BMW M1 (Gr. 4)
1983	EHCC (Racing Car)	(Italy) Mauro Nesti	Osella PA9 BMW (Gr. 6)
1982	EHCC (Serial Car)	(West Germany) Herbert Hürter	Ford Escort RS (Gr. 1)
1982	EHCC (Touring Car)	(France) Jacques Guillot	Porsche 930 (Gr. B)
1982	EHCC (Racing Car)	(West Germany) Herbert Stenger	Ford Capri Turbo Zakspeed (Gr. 2)
1981	EHCC (Serial Car)	(West Germany) Karl-Heinz Linnig	Porsche 930 (Gr. 3)
1981	EHCC (Touring Car)	(West Germany) Herbert Stenger	Ford Escort RS (Gr. 2)
1981	EHCC (Racing Car)	(France) Jean-Louis Bos	Lola T298 BMW (Gr. 6)
1980	EHCC (Serial Car)	(France) Roland Biancone	Porsche 930 (Gr. 3)
1980	EHCC (Touring Car)	(France) Jacques Alméras	Porsche 934 Turbo (Gr. 4)
1980	EHCC (Racing Car)	(France) Jean-Marie Alméras	Porsche 935 K3 (Gr. 5)
1979	EHCC (Serial Car)	(Luxembourg) Romain Wolff	Ford Escort 2000 RS (Gr. 1)
1979	EHCC (Touring Car)	(France) Jacques Alméras	Porsche 934 Turbo (Gr. 4)
1979	EHCC (Racing Car)	(France) Jean-Marie Alméras	Porsche 935 (Gr. 5)
1978	EHCC (Serial Car)	(West Germany) Herbert Stenger	Ford Escort RS (Gr. 1)
1978	EHCC (Touring Car)	(France) Jacques Alméras	Porsche 934 Turbo (Gr. 4)
1978	EHCC (Racing Car)	(France) Jean-Marie Alméras	Porsche 935 (Gr. 5)
1977	EHCC (Serial Car)	(West Germany) Anton Fischhaber	Porsche Carrera RS (Gr. 3)
1977	EHCC (Touring Car)	(West Germany) Heinz-Jürgen Pohlmann	Ford Escort 1800 RS (Gr. 2)
1977	EHCC (Racing Car)	(Italy) Mauro Nesti	Lola T296 BMW (Gr. 6)
1976	EHCC (Serial Car)	(Switzerland) Jean-Claude Béring	Porsche Carrera RSR (Gr. 3)
1976	EHCC (Touring Car)	(West Germany) Wilhelm Bartels	Porsche Carrera RSR (Gr. 5)
1976	EHCC (Racing Car)	(Italy) Mauro Nesti	Lola T294 BMW (Gr. 6)
1975	EHCC (Serial Car)	(Switzerland) Jean-Claude Bering	Porsche Carrera RSR (Gr. 3)
1975	EHCC (Touring Car)	(Austria) Willy Siller	BMW 2002 Ti (Gr. 5)
1975	EHCC (Racing Car)	(Italy) Mauro Nesti	Lola T294 BMW (Gr. 6)
1974	EHCC (Gran Turismo)	(West Germany) Anton Fischhaber	Porsche 911 Carrera (Gr. 4)
1974	EHCC (Sports Car)	(Spain) Juan Fernández	Osella PA2 Abarth (Gr. 7)
1974	EHCC (Racing Car)	(France) Robert Mieusset	March 742 BMW (Gr. 8+9)
1973	EHCC (Gran Turismo)	(West Germany) Sepp Greger	Porsche Carrera (Gr. 4)
1973	EHCC (Sports Car)	(Spain) Juan Fernández	Porsche 908/3 (Gr. 7)
1973	EHCC (Racing Car)	(France) Robert "Jimmy" Mieusset	March 722 Ford (Gr. 8+9)
1972	EHCC (Serial Car)	(West Germany) Helmut Mander	Opel Kadett (Gr. 2)
1972	EHCC (Gran Turismo)	(West Germany) Anton Fischhaber	Porsche 911S (Gr. 4)
1972	EHCC (Sports Car)	(Italy) Franco Pilone	Abarth 2000 (Gr. 5+7)
1972	EHCC (Racing Car)	(Switzerland) Xavier Perrot	March 722 Ford (Gr. 8+9)
1971	EHCC (Serial Car)	(Switzerland) Walter Brun	BMW 2800 CS (Gr. 2)
1971	EHCC (Gran Turismo)	(West Germany) Wilhelm Bartels	Porsche 908 (Gr. 4)
1971	EHCC (Sports Car)	(Austria) Johannes Ortner	Abarth 3000 (Gr. 5)
1970	EHCC (Serial Car)	(West Germany) Ernst Furtmayr	BMW 2800 CS (Gr. 2)
1970	EHCC (Gran Turismo)	(Switzerland) Claude Haldi	Porsche 911S (Gr. 4)
1970	EHCC (Sports Car)	(Austria) Johannes Ortner	Abarth 2000 (Gr. 5)
1969	EHCC (Serial Car)	(West Germany) Ernst Furtmayr	BMW 2002 Ti (Gr. 2)
1969	EHCC (Touring Car)	(Italy) Arturo Merzario	Abarth 2000S (Gr. 4+6)
1969	EHCC (Gran Turismo)	(West Germany) Sepp Greger	Porsche 911T (Gr. 3)
1969	EHCC (Sports Car)	(Switzerland) Peter Schetty	Ferrari 212 E Montagna (Gr. 7)
1968	EHCC (Serial Car)	(West Germany) Ernst Furtmayr	BMW 2002 Ti
1968	EHCC (Touring Car)	(West Germany) Sepp Greger	Porsche Carrera 6 (Gr. S)
1968	EHCC (Gran Turismo)	(West Germany) Holger Zarges	Porsche 911T
1968	EHCC (Sports Car)	(West Germany) Gerhard Mitter	Porsche 910 Bergspyder (Gr. P)
1967	EHCC (Serial Car)	(Italy) Ignazio Giunti	Alfa Romeo GTA
1967	EHCC (Touring Car)	(Austria) Rüdi Lins	Porsche Carrera 6 (Gr. S)
1967	EHCC (Gran Turismo)	(West Germany) Anton Fischhaber	Porsche 911S
1967	EHCC (Sports Car)	(West Germany) Gerhard Mitter	Porsche 910 Bergspyder (Gr. 7)
1966	EHCC (Gran Turismo)	(West Germany) Eberhard Mahle	Porsche 911
1966	EHCC (Sports Car)	(West Germany) Gerhard Mitter	Porsche 910 Coupé (Gr. P)
1965	EHCC (Gran Turismo)	(Switzerland) Herbert Müller	Porsche 904
1965	EHCC (Sports Car)	(Italy) Ludovico Scarfiotti	Dino 206 SP
1964	EHCC (Gran Turismo)	(Switzerland) Heini Walter	Porsche 904 GTS
1964	EHCC (Sports Car)	(West Germany) Edgar Barth	Porsche 904/8
1963	EHCC (Gran Turismo)	(West Germany) Herbert Müller	Porsche 356 Carrera GTL
1963	EHCC (Sports Car)	(West Germany) Edgar Barth	Porsche 718 WRS
1962	EHCC (Gran Turismo)	(Switzerland) Hans Kühnis	Porsche Carrera
1962	EHCC (Sports Car)	(Italy) Ludovico Scarfiotti	Ferrari 196 SP
1961	EHCC (Gran Turismo)	(Switzerland) Heinz Schiller	Porsche Carrera
1961	EHCC (Sports Car)	(Switzerland) Heini Walter	Porsche RS61
1960	EHCC (Gran Turismo)	(West Germany) Huschke von Hanstein	Porsche Carrera
1960	EHCC (Sports Car)	(Switzerland) Heini Walter	Porsche RS60
1959	EHCC (Sport Car)	(West Germany) Edgar Barth	Porsche RSK 1500
1958	EHCC (Sports Car)	(West Germany) Wolfgang von Trips	Porsche RSK
1957	EHCC (Sports Car)	(Switzerland) Willy Daetwyler	Maserati 200SI

== 1930s ==
The first European Hill Climbing Championship was contested between 1930 and 1933, under the aegis of the Association Internationale des Automobile Clubs Reconnus (AIACR), the predecessor of the FIA.

Champions
Year	Racing cars	Sports cars
1933	(Italy) Carlo Felice Trossi; Alfa Romeo	(Italy) Mario Tadini; Alfa Romeo
1932	(Germany) Rudolf Caracciola; Alfa Romeo	(Germany) Hans Stuck; Mercedes-Benz
1931	(Chile) Juan Zanelli; Nacional Pescara	(Germany) Rudolf Caracciola; Mercedes-Benz
1930	(Germany) Hans Stuck; Austro-Daimler	(Germany) Rudolf Caracciola; Mercedes-Benz

== See also ==
- FIA International Hill Climb Cup
- FIA Hill Climb Masters
- Hillclimbing
- Mont Ventoux Hill Climb
