= Abarth 207A Spyder =

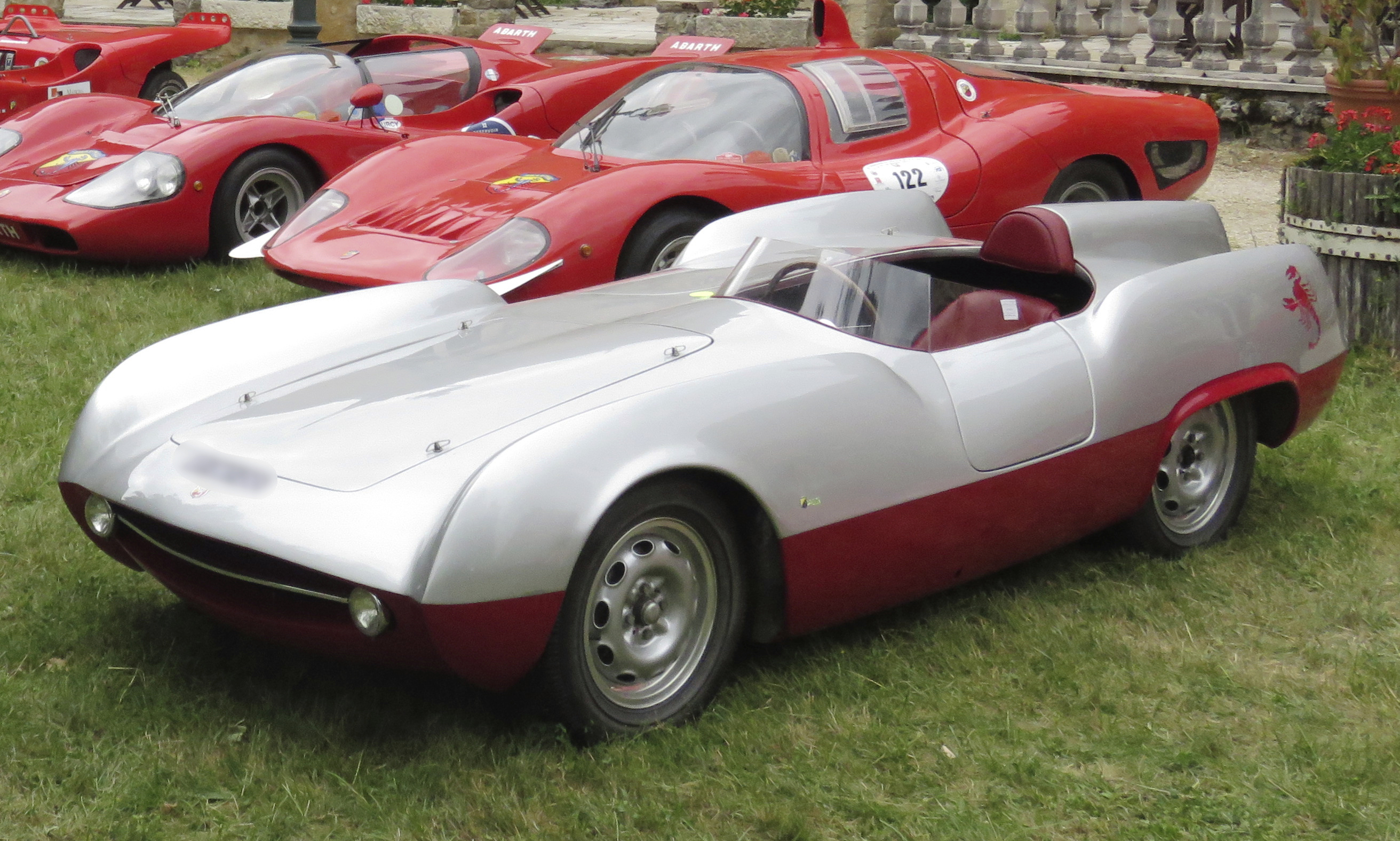

Overview
- Manufacturer: Abarth
- Also called: Abarth 208A Spyder; Abarth 209A Coupé
- Production: 1954–1955
- Assembly: Turin, Italy
- Designer: Felice Mario Boano

Body and chassis
- Layout: FR layout

Powertrain
- Engine: 1089 cc Fiat OHV I4
- Transmission: 4-speed manual

Dimensions
- Wheelbase: 2,050 mm (80.7 in)
- Length: 3,620 mm (142.5 in)
- Width: 1,550 mm (61.0 in)
- Height: 940 mm (37.0 in)
- Curb weight: 552 kg (1,217 lb)

Chronology
- Predecessor: Abarth 205A Berlinetta

The Abarth 207A Boano Spyder is a competition car created by Abarth & C. with the aim of selling in the United States market. It succeeded the earlier Abarth 205A Berlinetta and continued to use the Fiat 1100's four-cylinder engine. It also continued to use the naming practice started with the Cisitalia 202 and 204, which continued with the Abarth 204A and 205A. Design work started in 1954 and the car was first presented at the 1955 Turin Motor Show. A street-oriented version of the Spyder called the 208A, fitted with a panoramic windshield, was shown in 1954, as well as a Coupé model with an airy glasshouse, called the 209A. Both of the street versions appear to have remained one-offs.

== Design ==
The all-steel body was designed by Felice Mario Boano and built in his workshop. Only an open-bodied, streamlined two-seater with a fin behind the driver's headrest was available. The design was asymmetric; disregarding from the fin the entire body was taller on the driver's (left) side. While the chassis was designed by Abarth, there was still some Cisitalia DNA in the design, as implied by Abarth continuing the Cisitalia numbering scheme.

The chassis was a boxed platform design and used most of the Fiat 1100/103's suspension elements, replacing the Porsche torsion bar front suspension and the earlier Fiat 1100 E's rear suspension that had been installed on the preceding 204A/205A. One modification was that the 1100/103's leaf sprung live rear axle was coil sprung instead, and was modified to accept longer shock absorbers. The engine was tuned by the addition of twin Weber 36 DCO4 carburettors and new exhaust manifolds, delivering 66 hp (49 kW) at 6,000 rpm. The stainless steel exhaust pipes protruded from the right side of the car. For the small headlights, flanking a single, central chrome bar, Abarth used two of the Fiat 1100 TV's central driving lights.

In all, twelve examples of the 207A, 208A, and 209A were built. Most sources agree that ten were 207A (competition cars), while the two-tone, American-inspired 208A and 209A found no takers and remained one-offs. All of the 207As appear to have been delivered to the United States, where they competed sporadically. The ten 207As were all sold via Tony Pompeo in New York.

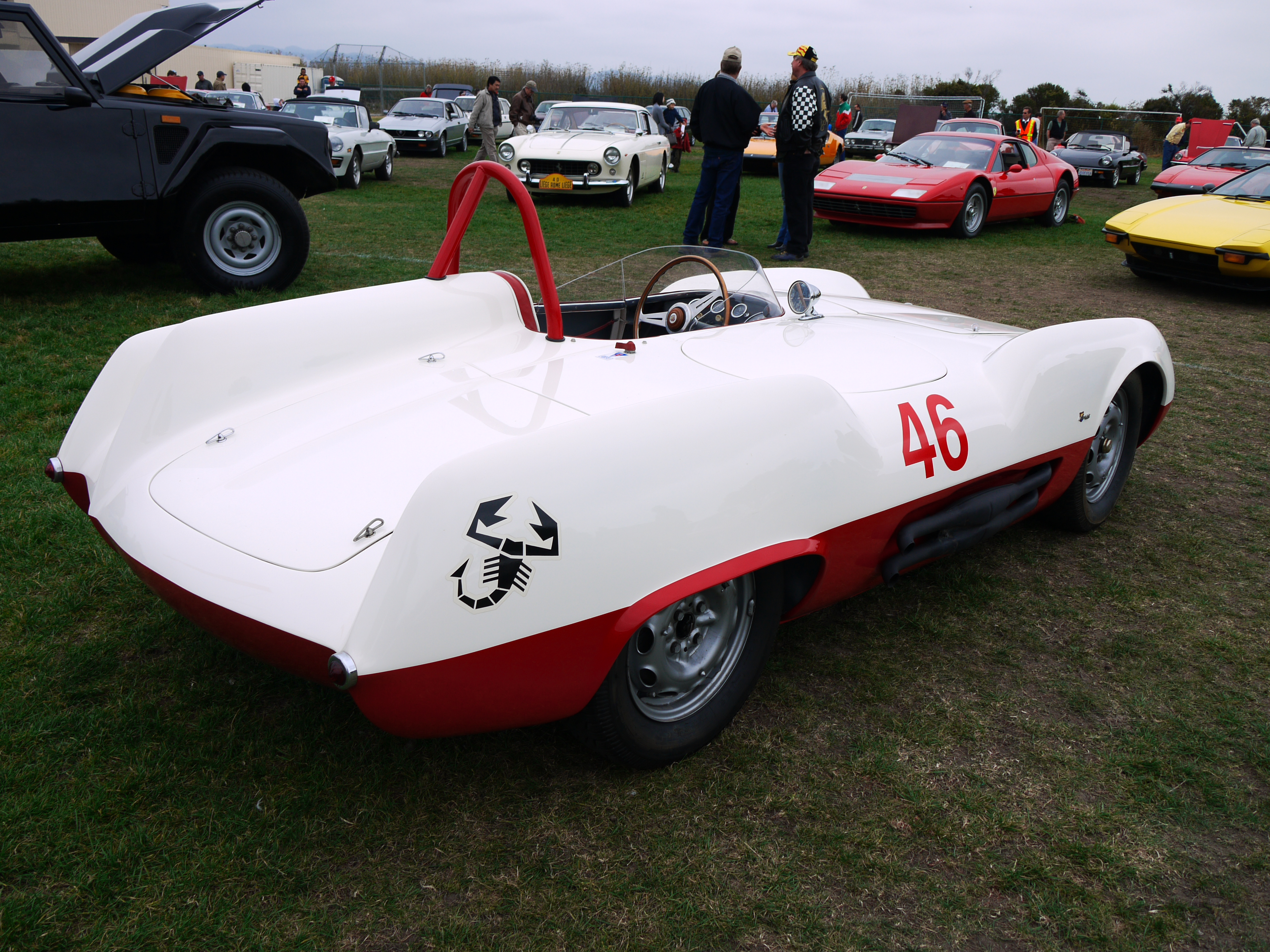
Rear view

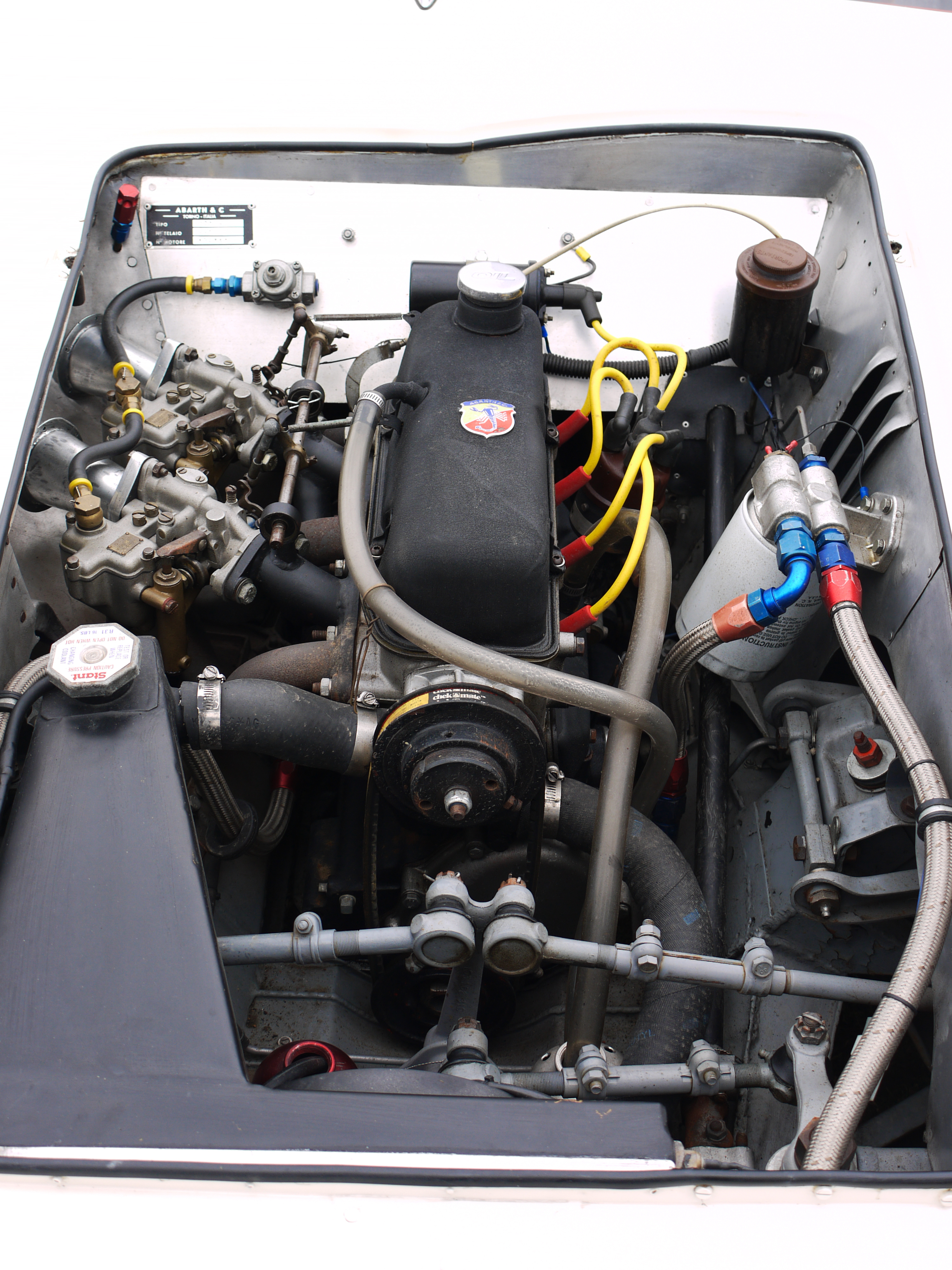
The Fiat 1100/103 engine in a 207A Spyder

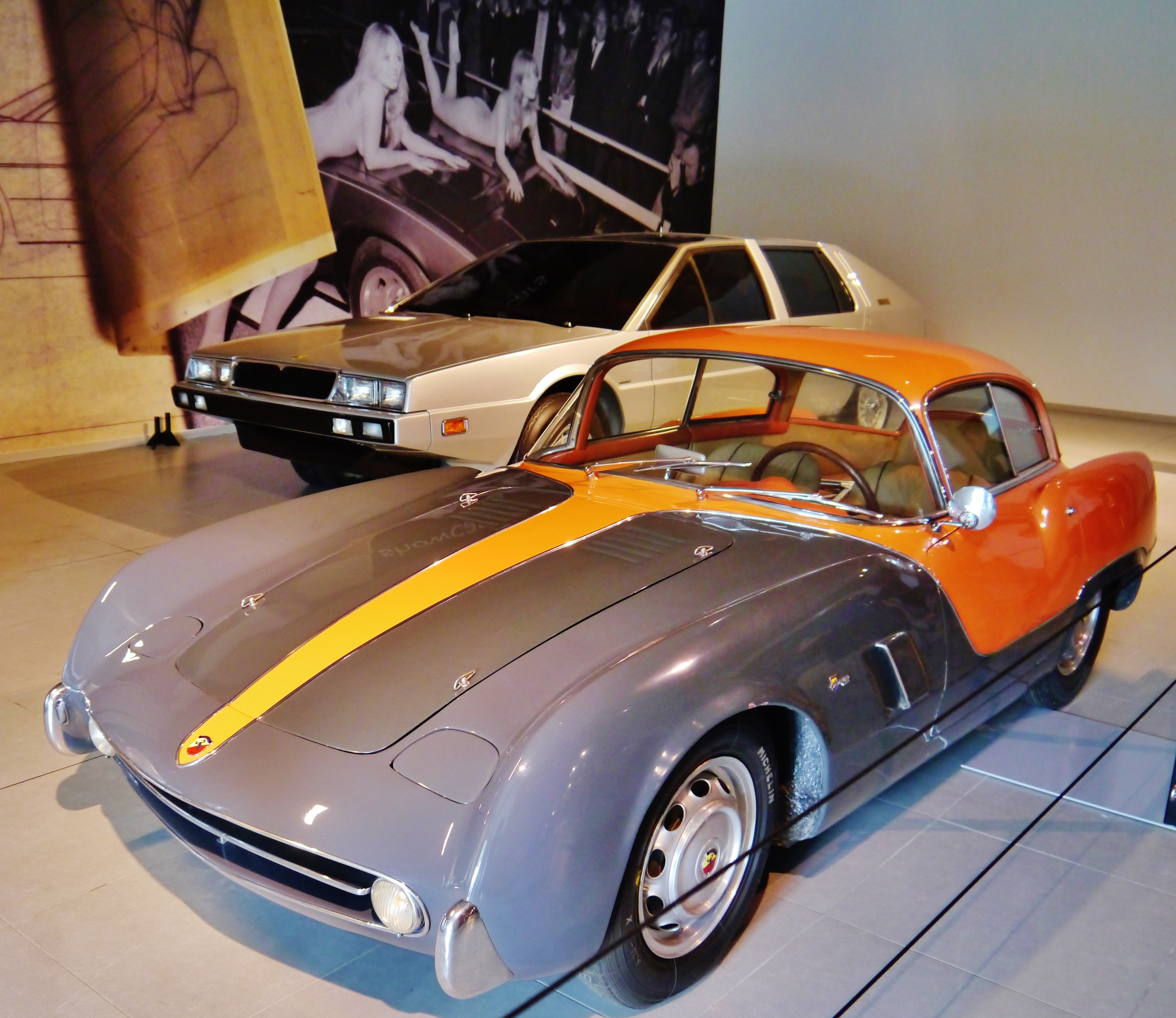
The Boano-bodied 209A Coupé

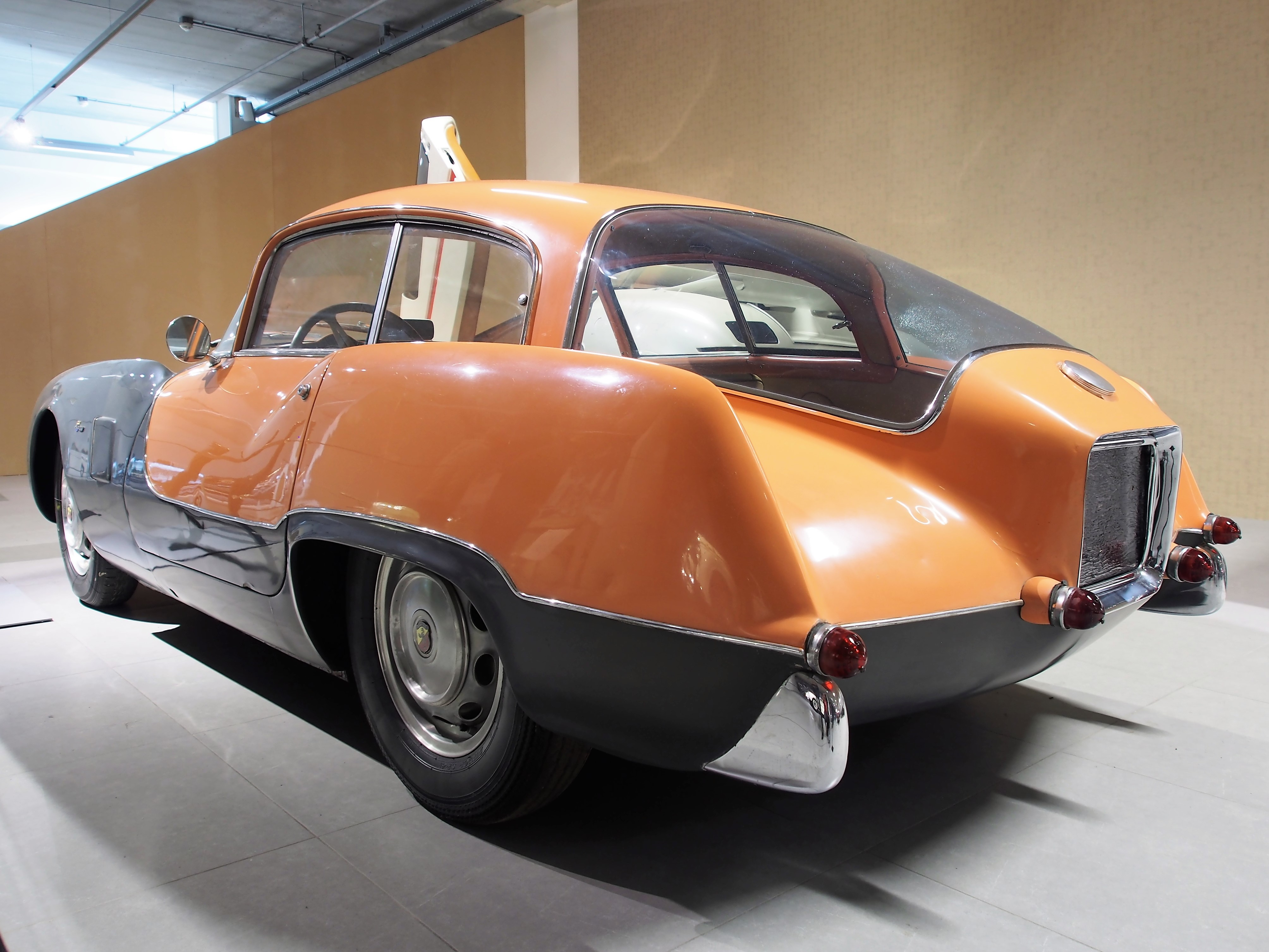
The Coupé's distinct glasshouse

The 208A and 209A were painted two-tone and equipped with panoramic windshields, creating a rather American look overall. Since the 207A was only fitted with two small driving lights mounted very low, the 208A and 209A were fitted with pop-up headlamps, a very early instance of this design. The exposed, double stainless steel exhaust on the passenger side remained. The 209A Coupé has a glasshouse reminiscent of Franco Scaglione's BAT cars.

== Competition history ==
The 207A's first race was the 1955 12 Hours of Sebring, where it was disqualified (after having finished second in its class) due to what the marshals judged an irregular refueling. The car was not very successful in competitions due to its excessive weight and compromised suspension design. The design proved entirely outdated when up against the Lotus Mark IX and the upcoming Lotus Eleven.
