= Cisitalia Grand Prix =

Single-seater Italian sports car

The Cisitalia Grand Prix is a single-seater car for the 1.5-litre supercharged race car class, prewar called voiturette, postwar promoted to Grand Prix class (later F1), built by Italian sports car manufacturer Cisitalia and introduced in 1949. It was designed on behalf of Cisitalia by Porsche in 1946–47, and is therefore also known by its Porsche project number, Type 360.

An advanced design with a rear mid-engine, rear-wheel-drive layout and four-wheel-drive on top of state of the art Grand Prix technology, it proved too complex for the small Italian firm to build—leading to a lengthy development and eventually to the financial collapse of the company. Between Cisitalia's 1949 liquidation and the fact that due to lack of entries, supercharged engines, and all large F1 engines, were banned for the 1952 Formula One season that was run according to F2 rules, the car never raced in Grands Prix.

The Type 360 is also noteworthy for using an early form of sequential manual transmission, and was one of the first race cars to do so.

== History ==
The car was commissioned by Piero Dusio in 1946 after Porsche family members had been imprisoned by French Occupation Zone authorities in December 1945. Ferry Porsche was released after six months. Dusio paid a large sum of money upfront, part of which was used to free 71 year old Ferdinand Porsche in August 1947 from the French prison in which he was being held effectively for ransom. Dusio gave Porsche only 16 months to complete the car which proved too short a time to sort out the advanced design.

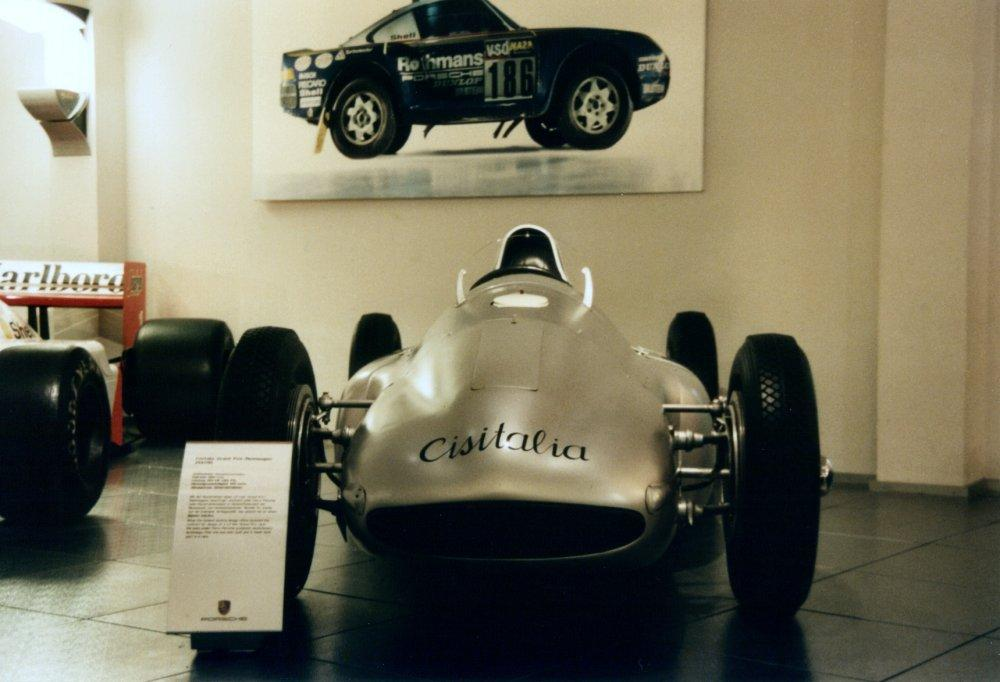
Porsche 360 Cisitalia in the old Porsche museum

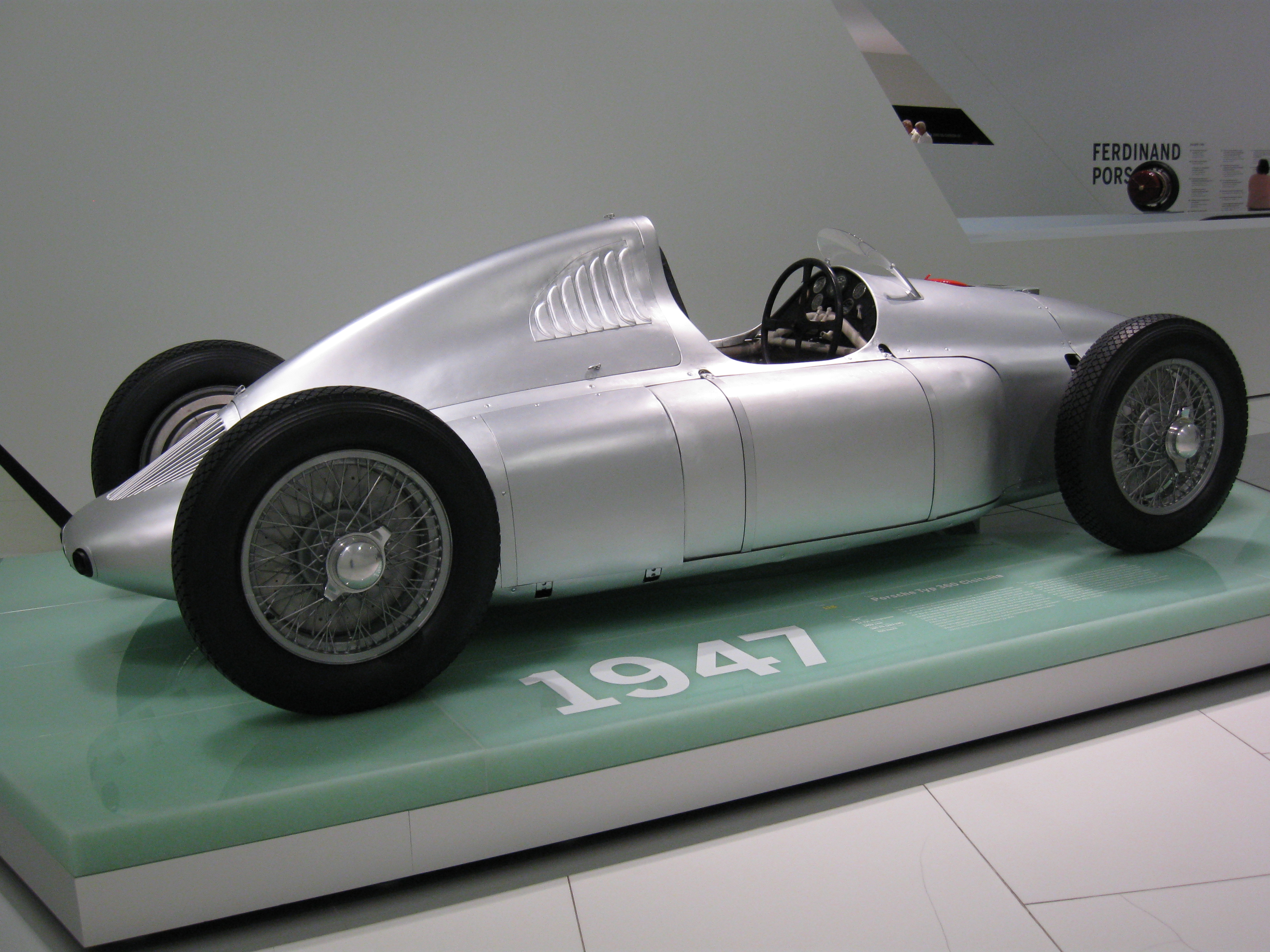
Porsche 360 Cisitalia in the new Porsche museum

== Design ==
The 1939 Tripoli Grand Prix was turned into a Voiturette race for smaller, 1500cc supercharged cars, like the factory Alfa Romeo 158/159 Alfetta and Maserati 4CL and 4CLT. Mercedes, believing that these rules might get adopted for GP racing, decided to invest in a new, smaller model, the V8-powered Mercedes-Benz W165, which took a double victory in the race. Engineers of Auto Union racing cars had witnessed Mercedes testing a "Tripoli car" at the old Hockenheimring in April 1939, which inspired them to develop a similar project. The Auto Union Typ E was a Porsche-designed, never completed 1,482 cc (53.0 x 56.0 mm) flat-12, 2-stage Roots supercharged racer developed in 1939 and 1940. It was projected to deliver well over 260 PS (191 kW) at 9,000 rpm.

In 1946, the Voiturette rules were promoted to Grand Prix motor racing rules, later called Formula One. The Auto Union concept provided the basis of the Cisitalia 360 car which was built in Italy by Cisitalia personnel with help from former Porsche employee Robert Eberan von Eberhorst around the Porsche Typ 360 engine, which is a mid-mounted supercharged 1,492 cc (56.0 x 50.5 mm) flat-twelve engine giving a conservative 300 PS (221 kW) at 8,500 rpm and a top speed of 300 km/h (186 mph). This engine became ineligible to race after the FIA introduced new engine regulations that banned forced induction for the 1952 Formula One season; it was never raced. A fully enclosed streamlined body for fast circuits was planned giving over 320 km/h (200 mph). Later bench tests showed about 385 PS (283 kW) at 10,500 rpm. The chassis was of chromoly tubing and featured on/off four-wheel-drive with a sequential gear-shift and a rear-mounted transaxle, also sending power through a driveshaft to a front differential. Suspension was independent with Porsche type trailing arms in front and parallel acting arms in the rear. Porsche's experience with the pre-war Auto Union Grand Prix cars showed through in the layout and design of the Cisitalia to the extent that it has been referred to as the "Auto Union Type E".

== Legacy ==
By the time the only prototype was finished Dusio was out of cash. The car languished in development until 1951, at one point being shipped off to Argentina to try to persuade president Juan Perón to invest in the company. By 1952 Formula One rules had changed and while Dusio attempted to source a 2-litre motor for the car a lack of funds relegated one of the most advanced Grand Prix cars of its day to a few Formula Libre events and quick retirement. The car is currently on display in the Porsche Museum in Stuttgart.
