= Abarth Cisitalia 204A =

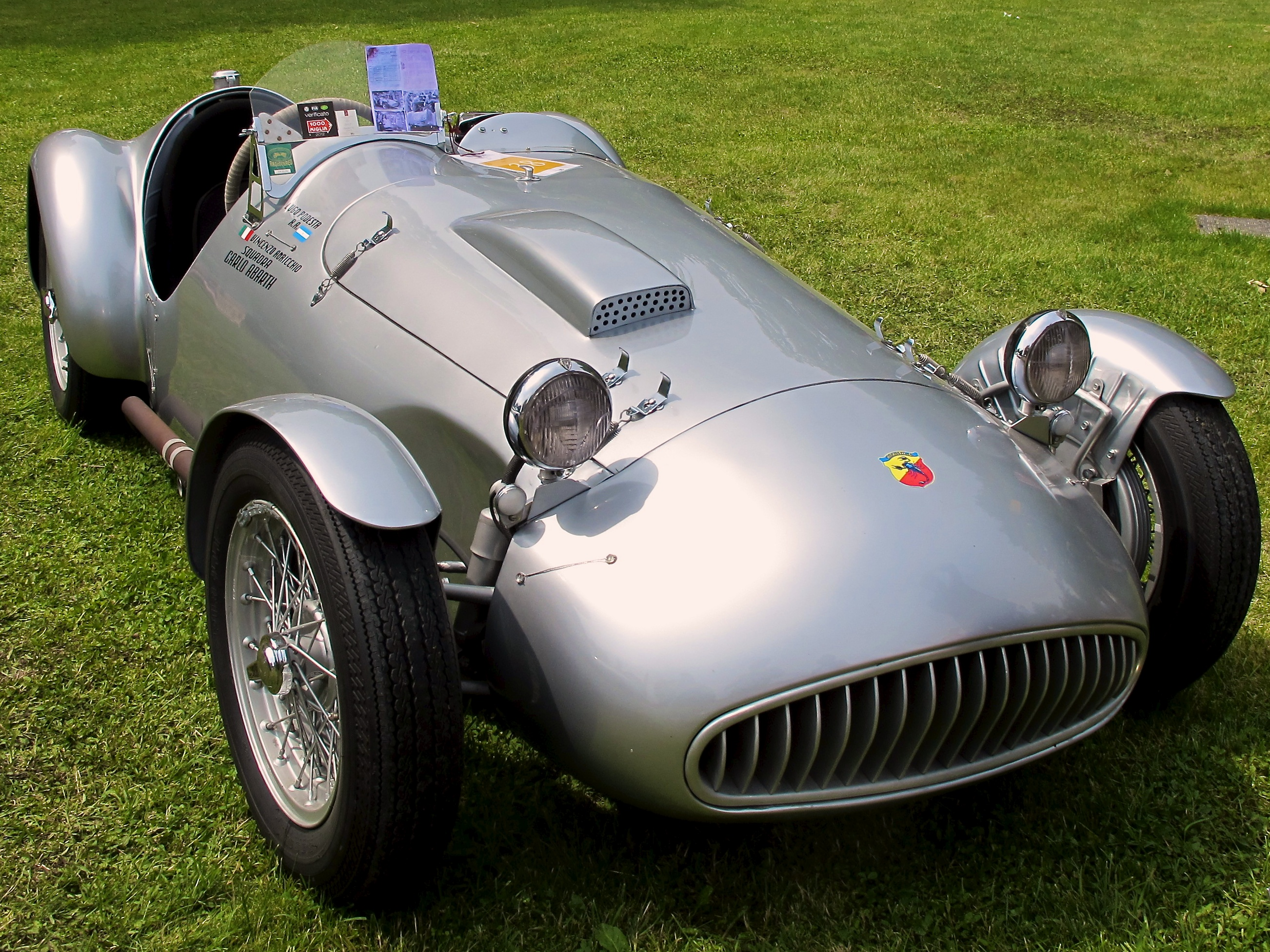

Overview
- Manufacturer: Abarth
- Production: 1948–1950 (6 produced)
- Assembly: Turin, Italy
- Designer: Giovanni Savonnuzzi

Body and chassis
- Layout: FR layout

Powertrain
- Engine: 1,109 cubic centimetres (67.7 cu in) I4
- Power output: 83 PS (82 bhp; 61 kW); 115 newton-metres (85 lbf⋅ft)
- Transmission: 4-speed manual

Dimensions
- Wheelbase: 2,100 mm (82.7 in)
- Length: 3,900 mm (153.5 in)
- Width: 1,460 mm (57.5 in)
- Curb weight: 510 kg (1,124 lb)

Chronology
- Successor: Abarth 205A Berlinetta

The Abarth Cisitalia 204A was the first product of the recently founded Abarth & C.. As part of a deal in which Abarth took over the liquidated Cisitalia assets, the erstwhile Cisitalia 204 was marketed under both the Abarth and Cisitalia brands. Abarth received two complete 204 Spiders and two or three unfinished chassis in various states of completion; in total six 204A were built. Abarth went on to develop several more cars derived from the Fiat 1100-based Cisitalia 204, following up with the Abarth 205A Berlinetta, Abarth 207A Spyder, Abarth 208A Spyder, and the Abarth 209A Coupé.

== History ==
Carlo Abarth had been sporting director of the Cisitalia racing team since 1947. To replace the 202 with a lighter design, Abarth worked with engineers Luciano Scholz and Rudolf Hruska to develop the new Cisitalia 204's chassis and with Giovanni Savonuzzi to develop the aluminium body. Most agree that Carrozzeria Motto did the panel beating, although there is no definitive evidence thereof. The new design used a tubular frame with a centre crossbrace rather than the spaceframe of the 202, with a live, leaf sprung rear axle and using a Porsche torsion bar front axle. The front suspension assembly was bought whole from Porsche. Brakes were hydraulically operated drums. Built on a very short, 2,100 mm (82.7 in) wheelbase, the new chassis was very rigid and very light. At 510 kg (1,124 lb), it was ten to twenty percent lighter than its competitors. The design retained the Fiat 1100's four-cylinder engine, fitted with double Weber 36 DR4SP carburettors producing a max power of 83 CV (61 kW). The reported top speed is 190 km/h (118 mph).

In 1948, while the 204 was being developed, Cisitalia folded and founder Piero Dusio left for Argentina. As part of his severance from Cisitalia, Abarth obtained five 204 sports cars (two complete Spiders and three unfinished), a D46 single-seater, and various spares. On 31 March 1949, Abarth & C. was founded in Bologna. The Cisitalia 204s were immediately rechristened Abarth Cisitalia 204A, as the takeover deal required Abarth to field the cars under the Cisitalia name for at least one year. In addition to the two completed cars, Abarth completed two of the additional chassis during 1949. He built two more cars using a mix of existing and new parts; by the time these were completed the agreement with Cisitalia had run its course and the third batch of cars only ever carried "Abarth" badging. Abarth proceeded to build and race a series of sports cars developed from these final Cisitalia cars.

== Competition ==
The Abarth Cisitalia 204A's first race was on 9 May 1948, with Adolfo Macchieraldo at the wheel. The first victory came at Mantua on 13 June 1948 (again with Macchieraldo driving). The "Squadra Abarth" racing team lined up celebrated drivers, including Tazio Nuvolari, Franco Cortese, and Piero Taruffi. Notably, Tazio Nuvolari made his last appearance in racing at the wheel of an Abarth 204A, winning its class in the Palermo–Monte Pellegrino hillclimb on 10 April 1950.

After the agreement with Cisitalia came to an end, the 204As were campaigned under the Abarth name alone, no longer using Cisitalia badging. In all, 19 victories are ascribed to the 204A.

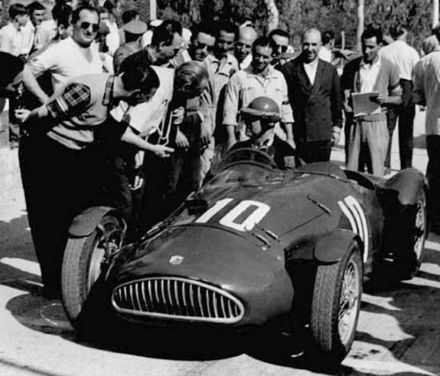
At the 1951 Targa Florio, where Emiliano Romano finished fourth in his #10 Abarth 204A
