= Abarth 205A Berlinetta =

Abarth 205A
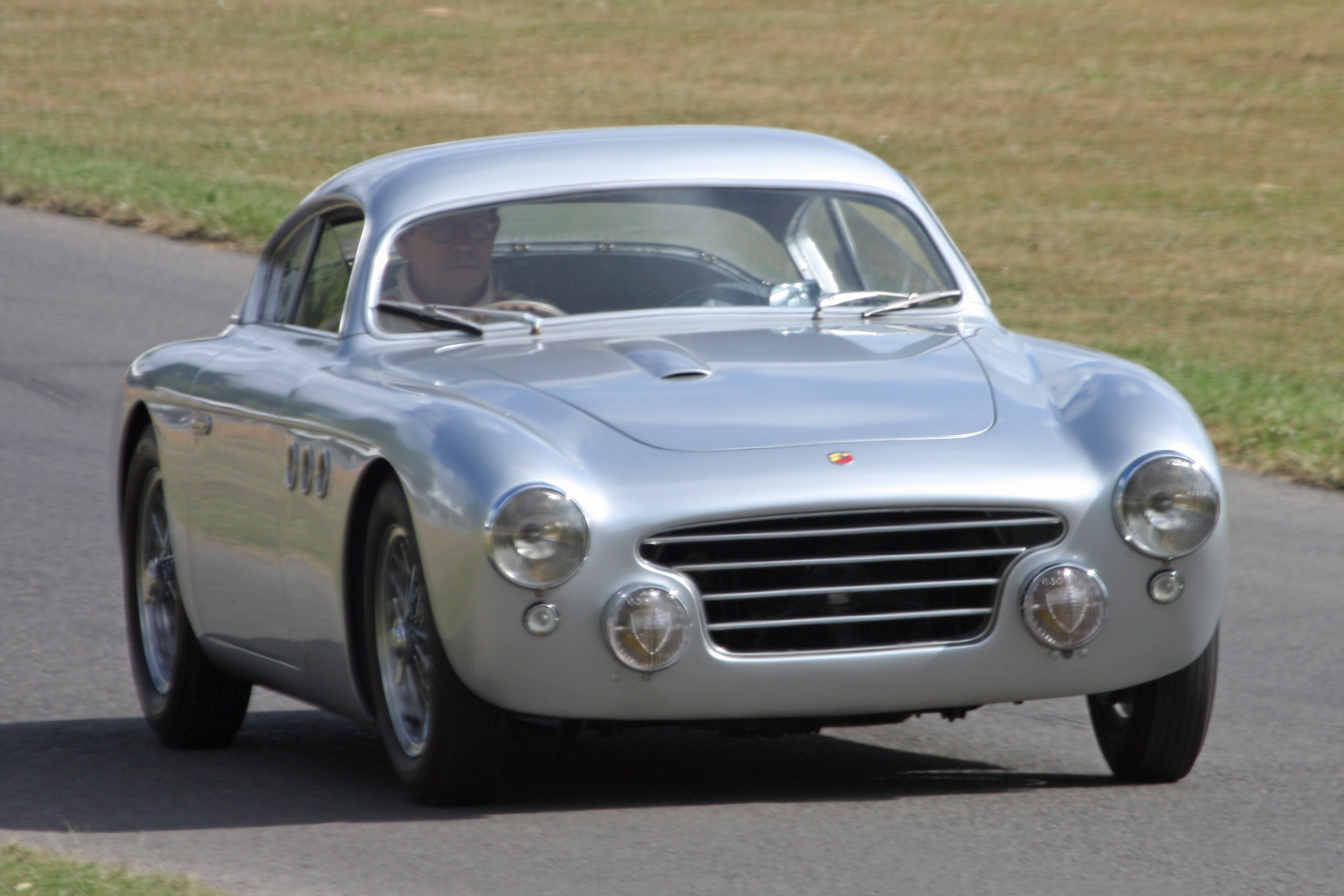
- Abarth 205 Monza

Overview
- Manufacturer: Abarth
- Also called: Abarth 204A Berlinetta; Abarth 205A Monza
- Production: 1950–1953 (4 produced)
- Assembly: Turin, Italy
- Designer: Giovanni Michelotti (for Ghia)

Body and chassis
- Layout: FR layout

Powertrain
- Engine: 1089 cc Fiat OHV I4; 1188 cc Fiat OHV I4
- Power output: 65 PS (48 kW) (1200 engine)
- Transmission: 4-speed manual

Dimensions
- Wheelbase: 2,210 mm (87.0 in)
- Length: 3,495 mm (137.6 in)
- Width: 1,420 mm (55.9 in)
- Height: 1,245 mm (49.0 in)
- Kerb weight: 818 kg (1,803 lb)

Chronology
- Successor: Abarth 207A Spyder

Abarth 205 at Goodwood Festival of Speed 2009

The Abarth 205A Berlinetta was a coupé sports car, also known as the Abarth 205A Monza built by Austrian born tuning expert Carlo Abarth in 1950. It was a development of the Abarth Cisitalia 204A but with a new platform chassis, still using the engine and other components from the Fiat 1100 B/E. Only three 205As were finished in 1950; chassis numbers 101, 102, and 103, but an additional car (chassis 104) was built in 1953 with an extravagant Ghia body. Slow sales meant that for the next few years Abarth chose to focus on building his exhaust and tuning business, allowing competition and car manufacturing take a backseat. In 1955, the 205A was succeeded by the 207A Spyder and its derivatives.

== Design ==
Just like the Cisitalia 202 and 204, the 205A continued to use a pushrod 1.1-liter engine derived from the Fiat 1100. These cars have confusingly sometimes been referred to as "Abarth 204A Berlinetta," but the 205's platform chassis was actually a new design. The Michelotti-designed body used on the first three cars was made from aluminium.

=== Chassis 101 ===
The first model of this type was manufactured in March 1950 and was first campaigned on March 26, 1950, during the Inter-Europe Cup run at the Monza Autodrome. With Guido Scagliarini, driver and associate of Carlo Abarth, at the wheel, they won their category. This car also took part of the 1950 Mille Miglia, where it did not finish. Carrying starting number 533, it was fitted with temporary nose and tail extensions for improved aerodynamics, made by in-house coachbuilder Giuseppe Manera.

The engine in this car is a Fiat 1100 B engine fitted with a Cisitalia head, a dry sump, two Weber carburetors, and producing about 80 hp (59 kW). This car is currently in the O'Sullivan Square Museum in San Diego.

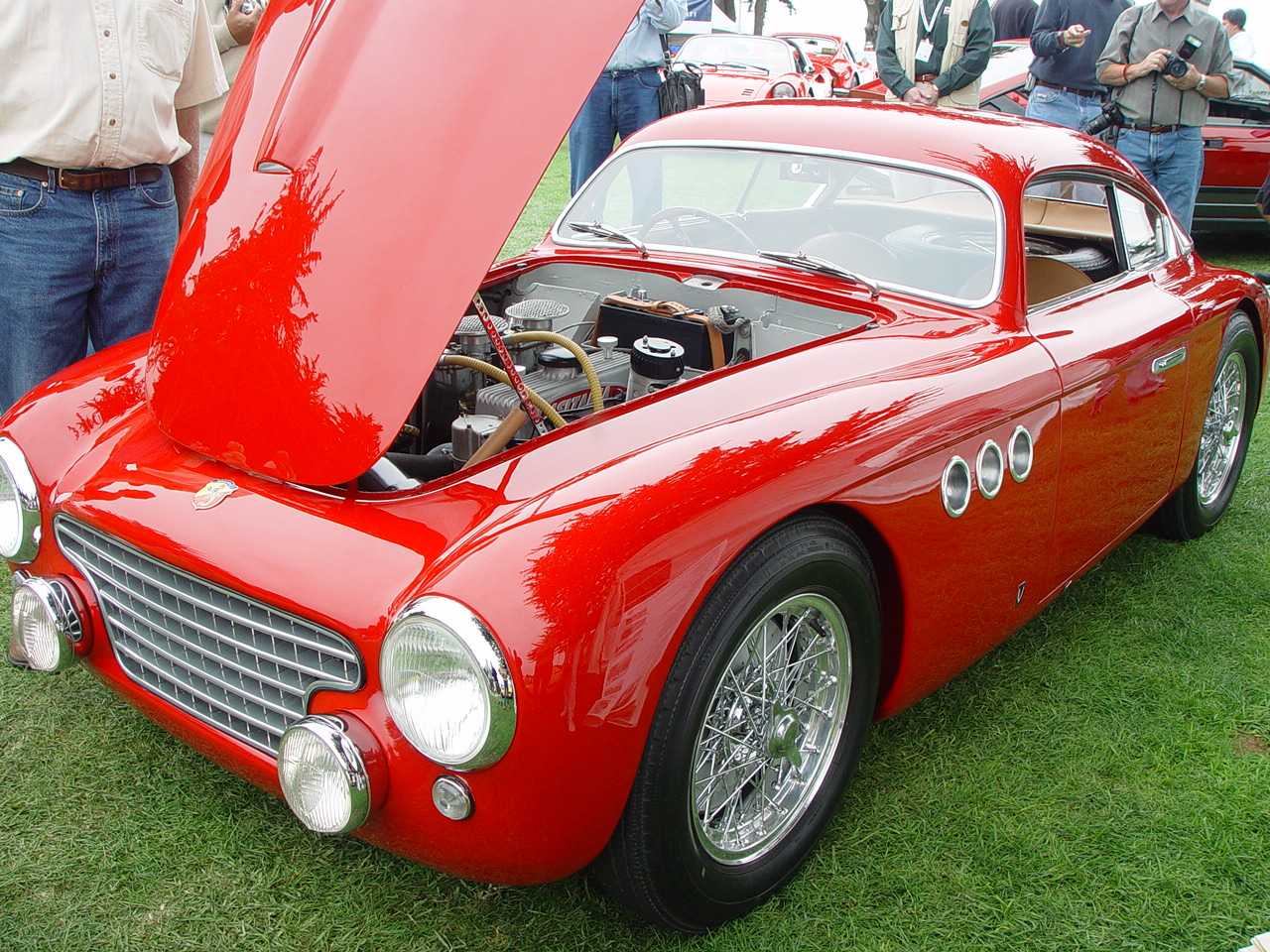
Abarth 205A at the 2004 Concorso Italiano

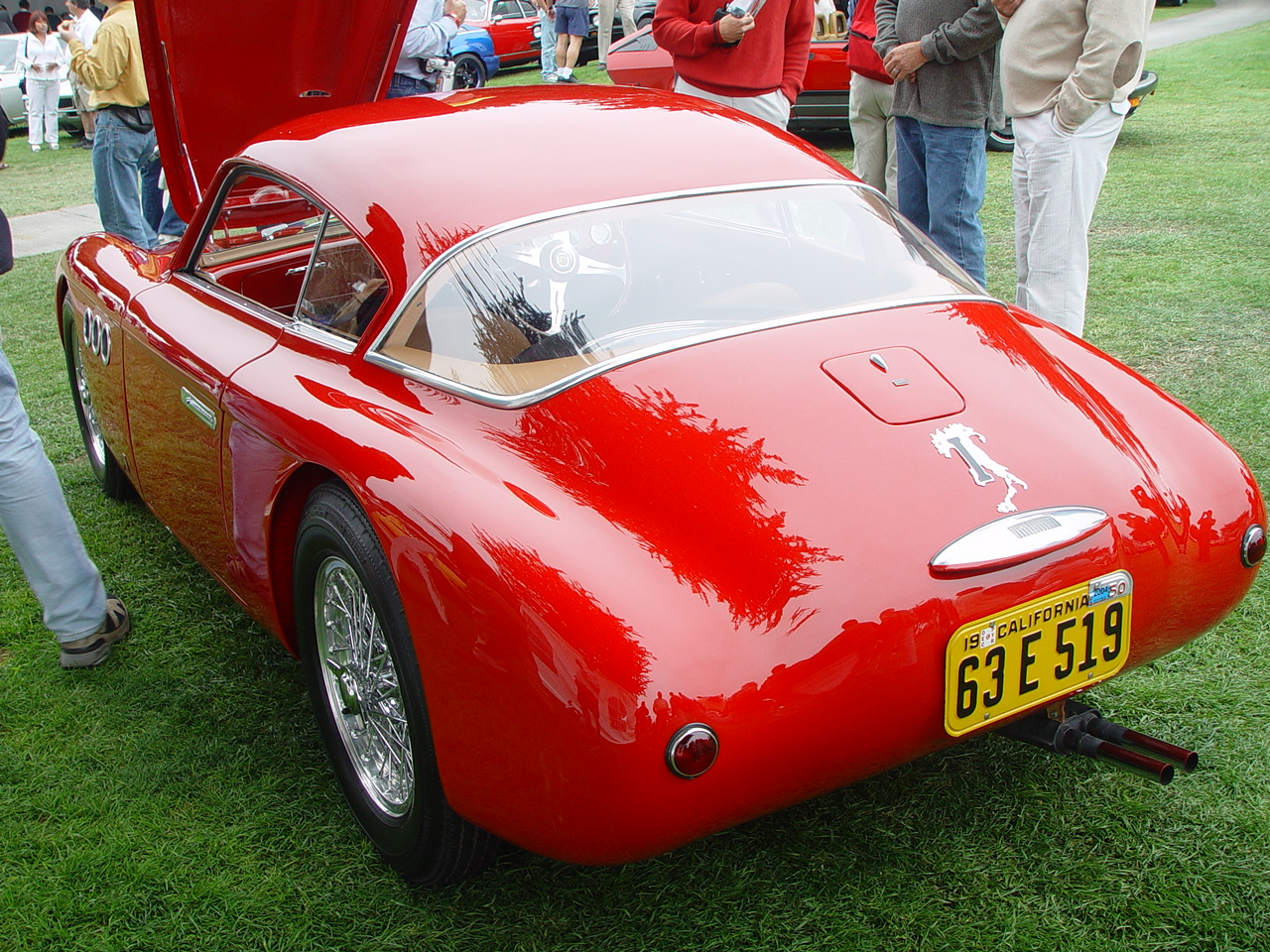

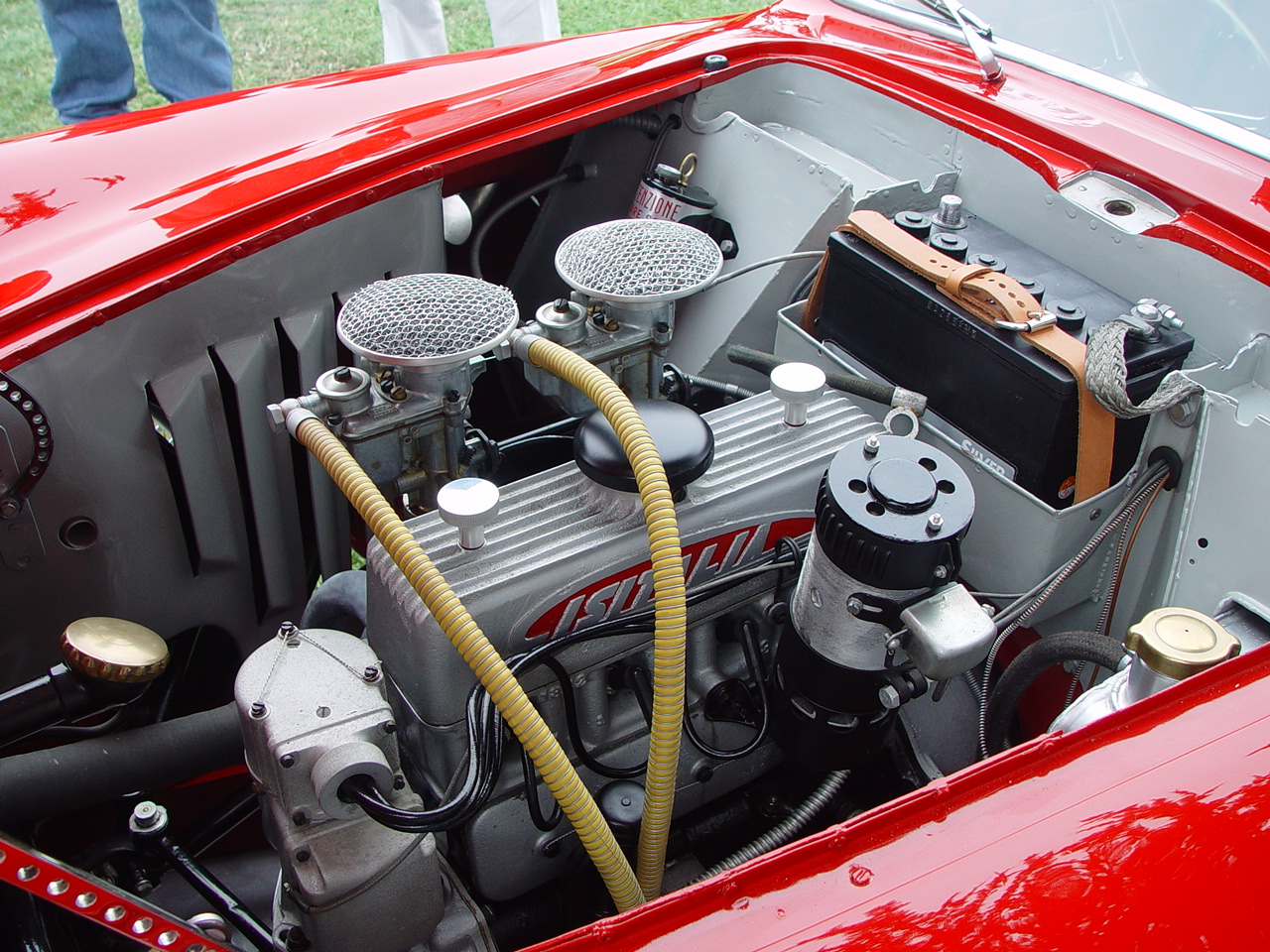

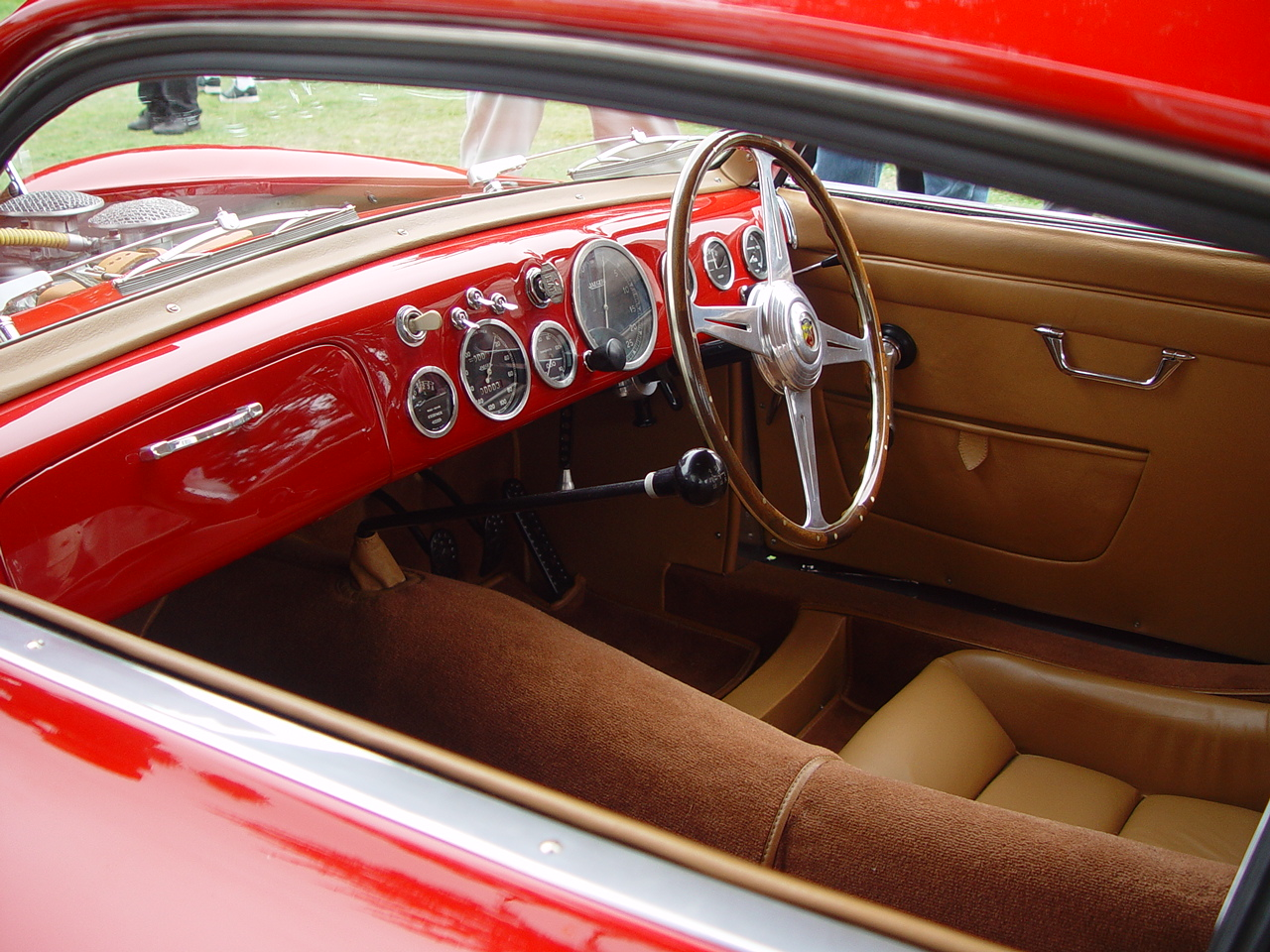

=== Chassis 102 ===
This car, which has chassis number 102, is in fact the third and last example made. It differs in a number of ways, mainly the result of having a 2,330 mm (91.7 in) wheelbase rather than the original's 2,210 mm (87.0 in). It is presumed that this car was intended for the personal use of Carlo Scagliarini, brother of the driver and partner of Carlo Abarth, after it was retired from competition. The engine was similar to the one installed in chassis 101, although this unit was tuned by S.I.R.C.A. (Societa Italiana Rappresentanze Commercio Automobili) of Milano.

The just finished, still unpainted car competed at the 1950 Mille Miglia (listed as an "Abarth 204/A"), where it carried starting number 630. Driver Carlo Scagliarini and co-driver Luigi Garrone managed a 31st place at the finish (9th in class S1.1). It was also in the entry list as a "Sirca-Fiat" or "Abarth 205 Sirca" for the 1951 Mille Miglia. It was to be driven by Hermann Lothaller and Karl Anzenbacher and was issued number #231, but did not start the race.

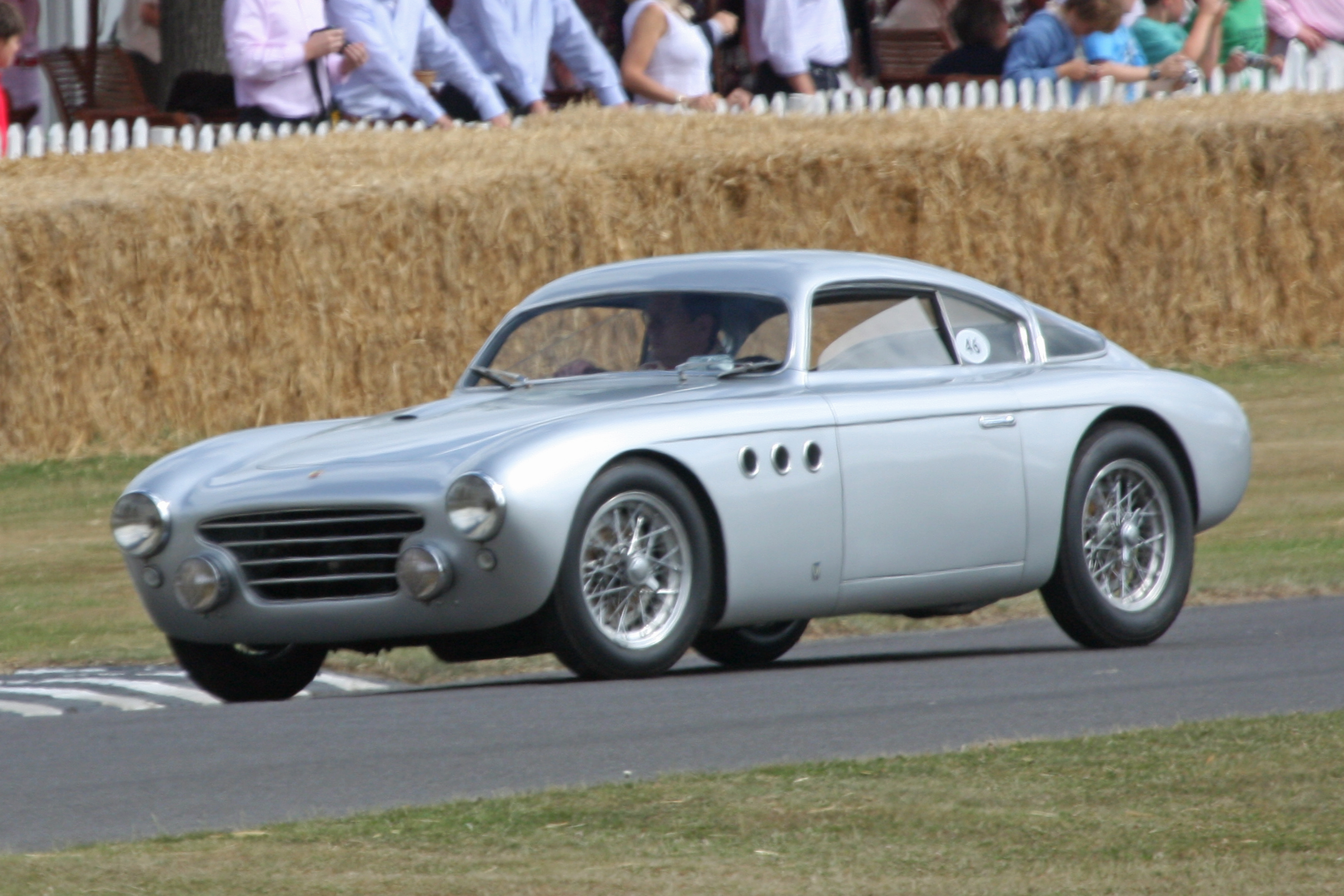
Chassis #102 at the 2009 Goodwood Festival of Speed

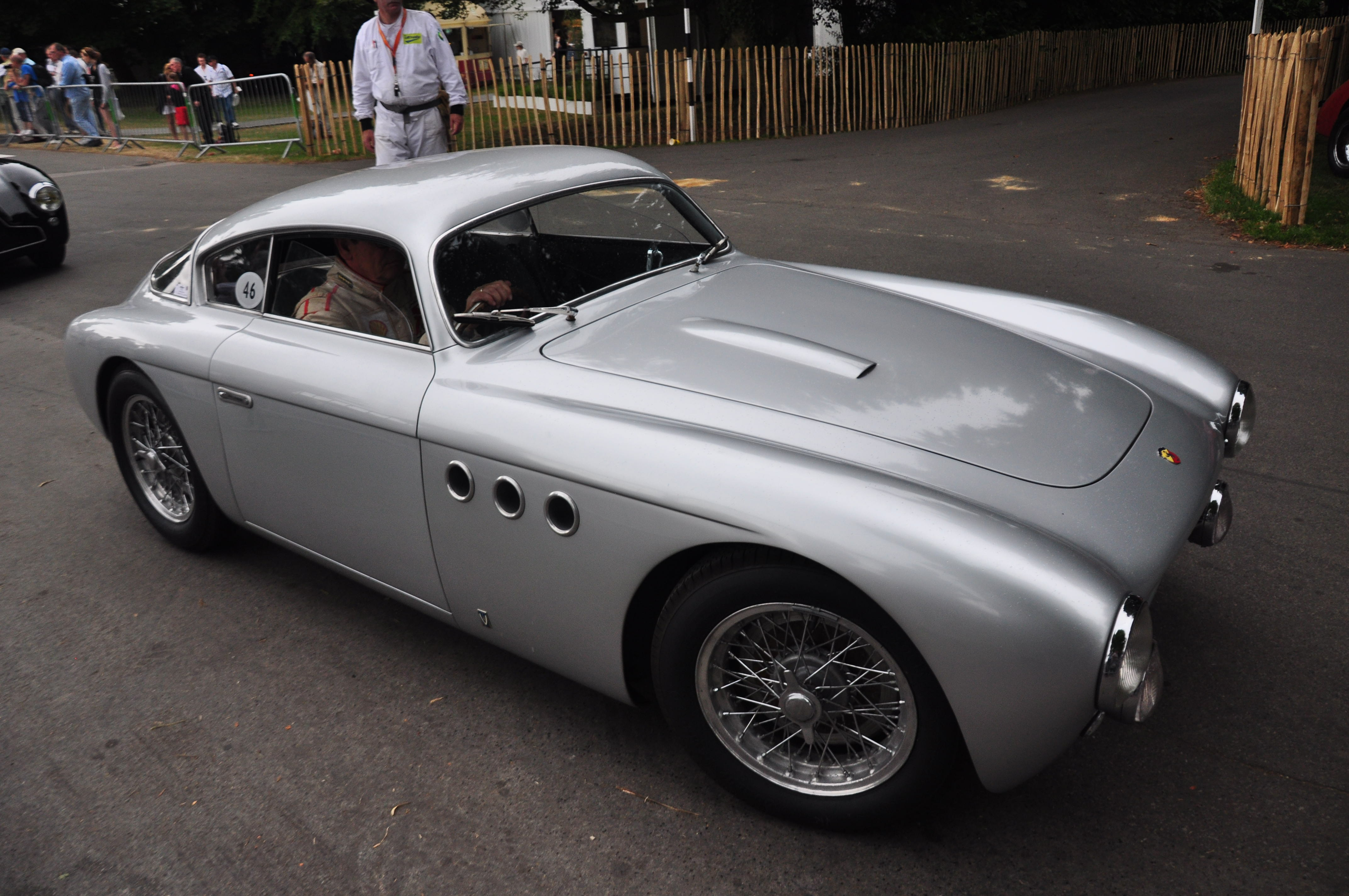

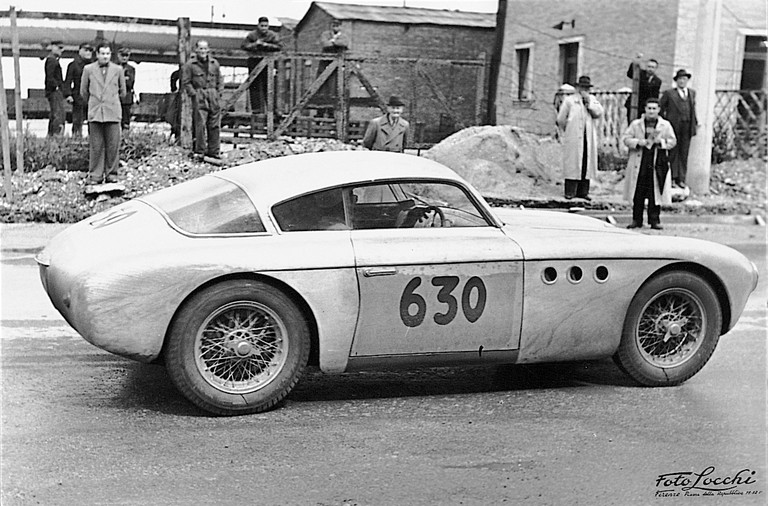
At the 1950 Mille Miglia

=== Chassis 103 ===
The most fully developed design, chassis number 103 is the second example built in spite of carrying the final chassis number. Unlike the first chassis, intended solely for competition, this was aimed at small series production for a wealthy clientele and was thus luxuriously appointed. This benefitted from a slight increase in the displacement of the Fiat 1100 engine from 1,089 to 1,188 cc (72.5 cu in), but with power reduced to 65 hp (48 kW) DIN thanks to a lower state of tune.

Its official presentation took place at the Turin Motor Show in May 1950. The Michelotti-bodied Ferrari 166 Inter, presented in September 1950, was very similar, although larger in size, and marketed at about the same price. Both models were from the same designer and body shop, which did not favor the relationship between the two business leaders. The Ferrari's distinctly better performance meant that the 205A found no further takers.

=== Chassis 104 (Sport Ghia Coupé) ===
In 1953, the fourth 205A chassis (number 104) was completed with an eye-catching, airplane-inspired, bullet nosed design by Giovanni Michelotti, carrying Carrozzeria Ghia badges. The Abarth 1100 Sport Ghia Coupé, as it was called, received the mechanicals from the recently introduced Fiat 1100/103, with the engine tuned by Abarth to produce around 65 hp (48 kW). The car was shown at Turin in 1953 and at a few more European shows; it was then sold to Bill Vaughn, an American builder of fibreglass bodyshells. He showed it at the 1954 New York Auto Show as the "Vaughn SS Wildcat" and claimed that it was fitted with an overhead cam V8 engine. No Vaughn Wildcats were built and there is no evidence of the engine having been swapped. The car was not shown publicly again until 2015.

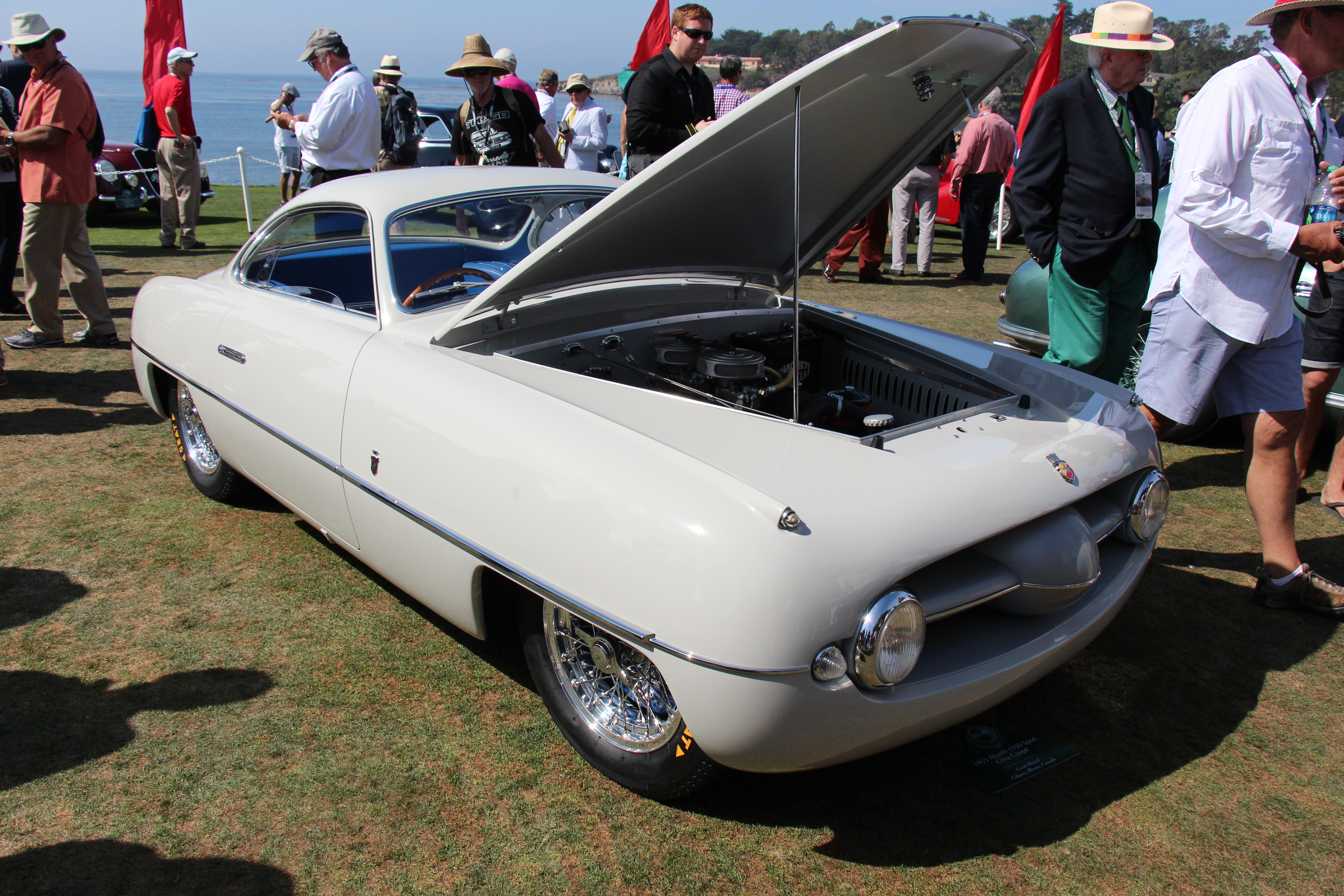
The 1953 Abarth 1100 Sport Ghia Coupé at the 2015 Pebble Beach Concours d'Elegance
