= Cisitalia =

Italian carmaker

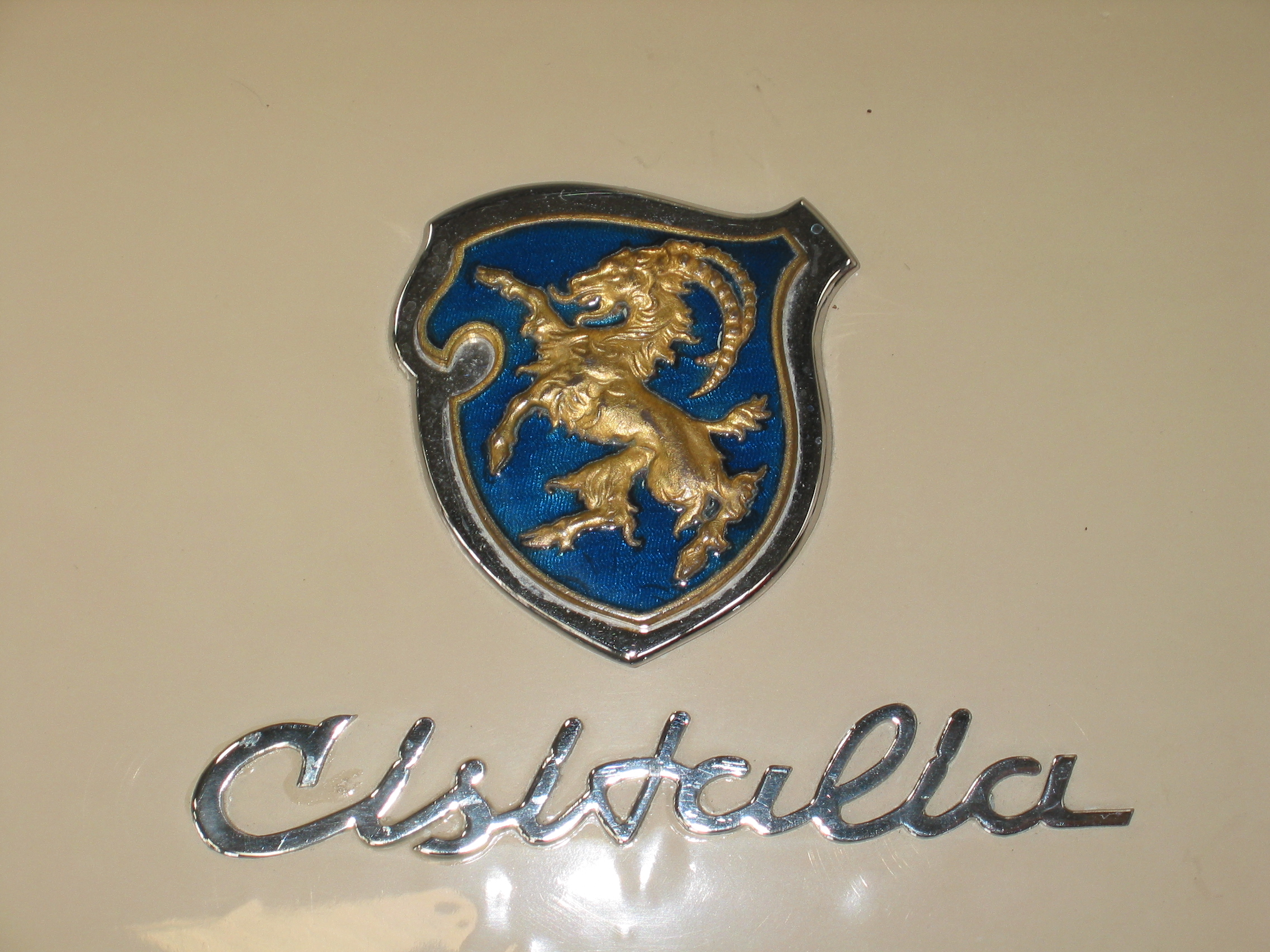
- Industry: Automotive
- Founded: 1946
- Founder: Piero Dusio
- Defunct: 1963
- Fate: Bankrupt
- Headquarters: Turin, Italy
- Products: Automobiles

Cisitalia was an Italian sports and racing car brand named after "Compagnia Industriale Sportiva Italia", a business conglomerate founded in Turin in 1946 by industrialist and sportsman Piero Dusio. One of the most memorable cars manufactured by the company was the 202 GT from 1946, which earned praise for its design and sold about 170 units.

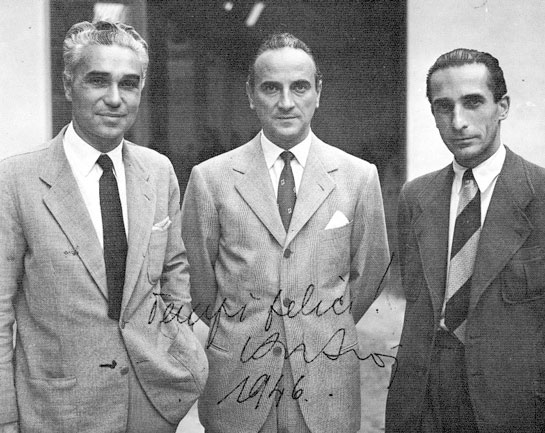
Cisitalia people, from left: Piero Taruffi, Piero Dusio, and Giovanni Savonuzzi

== Selected models ==
=== D46 ===
Cisitalia was founded by Piero Dusio in Turin in 1946. The company initially deployed Fiat street car parts as the foundation for their D46. Designed by Dante Giacosa, who had a vast knowledge of Fiat parts as he had designed the 500 Fiat Topolino before WWII, the car featured engine and suspensions from the small Fiat car although substantially modified for racing purposes. Dry sump lubrication and further tweaks considerably increased the engine's power to 60-70 bhp. With a spaceframe chassis and weighing under 400 kg (880 lb), the car was deemed fit for competing at top level. The D46 made a successful debut in 1946, dominating the voiturette series. A pool of talented drivers, including Tazio Nuvolari and Felice Bonetto, drove the D46 to a few victories, beating more advanced but older racing cars.

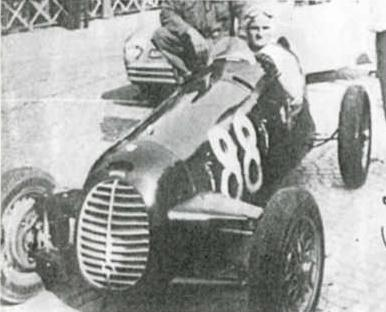
Ilario Bandini seated in a Cisitalia D46 at the Asti circuit in 1947

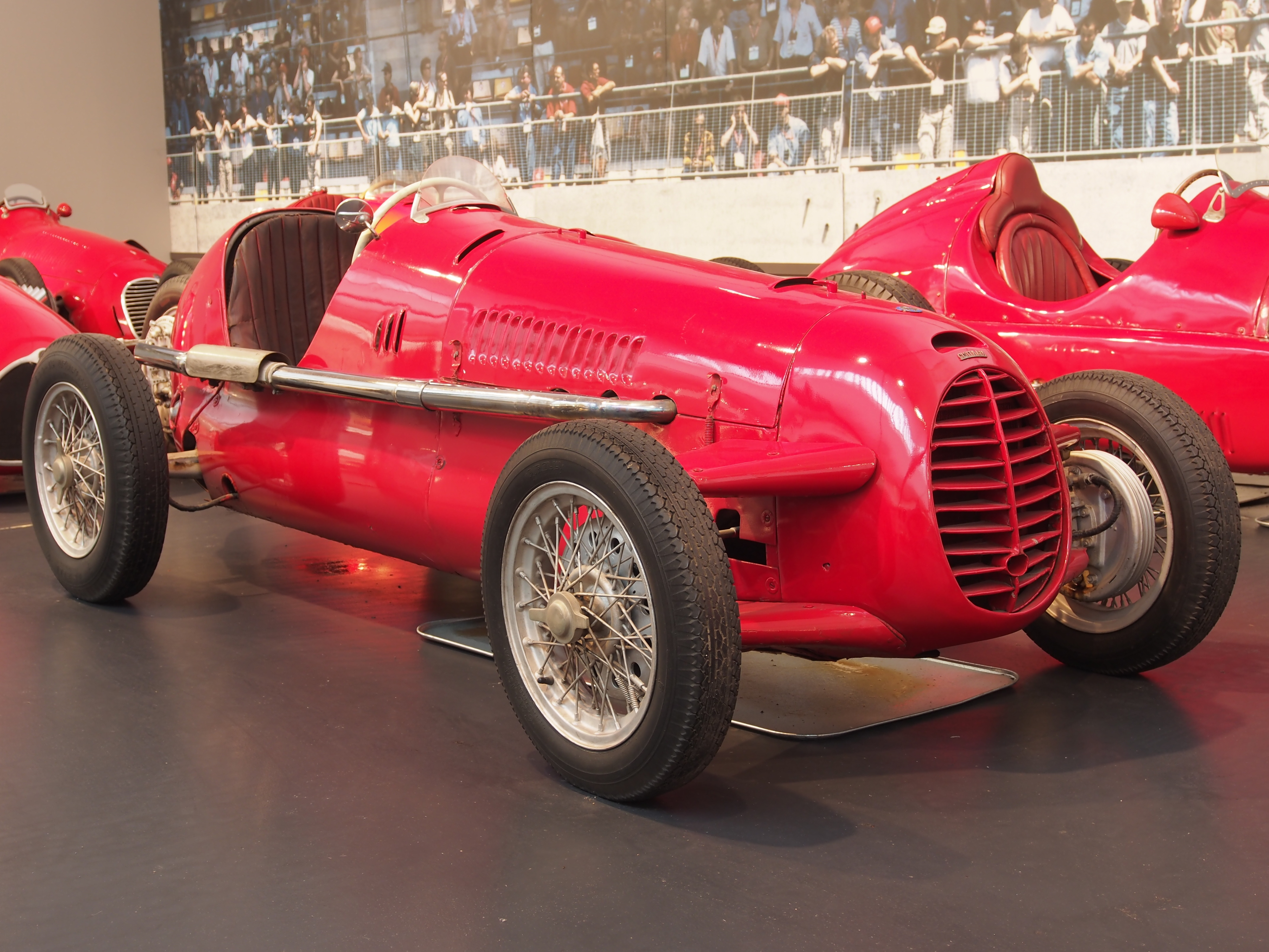
Cisitalia D46

=== Grand Prix ===
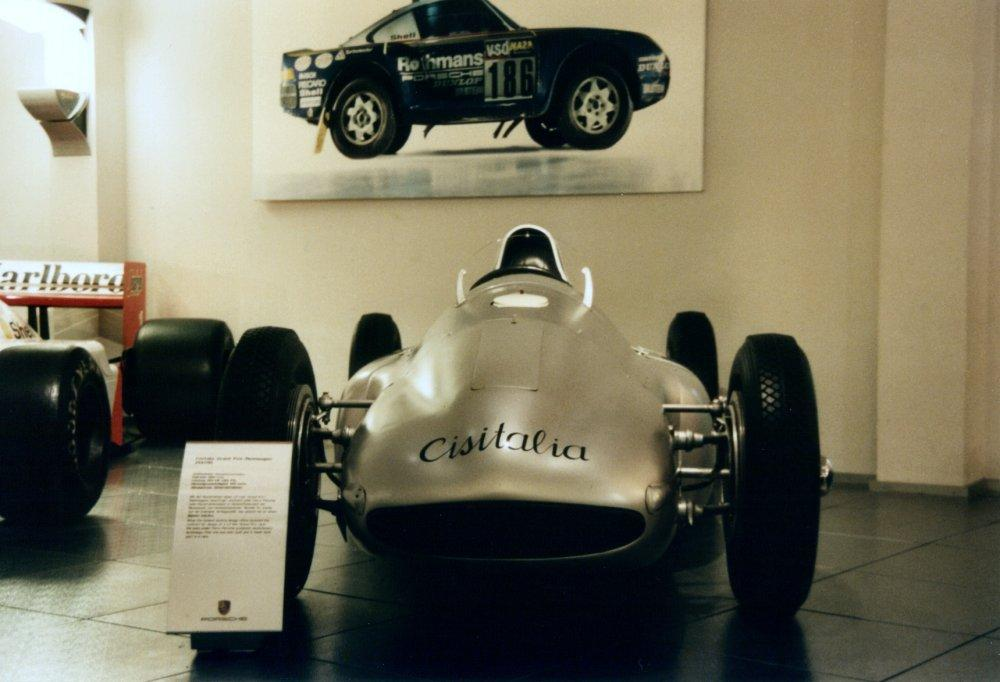
Porsche 360 Cisitalia

The D46's success led Dusio to consider a more ambitious project - a single seater, Grand Prix car. Ferry Porsche, the son of Ferdinand Porsche, was commissioned to design the car. His work resulted in the highly innovative but technically complex Cisitalia 360. With a mid-engined layout and four-wheel drive, the Type 360 turned out to be far too expensive for Dusio to build, to the extent of almost bankrupting his company.

=== 202 ===
Dusio went on to commission some of Europe's leading designers to work on his cars. In 1947 Pinin Farina created a chassis with an handcrafted aluminum body. When first launched on the occasion of the Villa d'Este Gold Cup show in Como, and at the 1947 Paris Motor Show, the two-seat 202GT was regarded as an aesthetic and technical achievement that radically transformed postwar automobile body design. Pinin Farina's design was eventually honored by New York's Museum of Modern Art in 1951 in the "Eight Automobiles" exhibition. The Cisitalia was displayed with seven other cars, including the (1930 Mercedes-Benz SS tourer; the 1939 Bentley saloon designed by James Young; the 1939 Talbot-Lago by Figoni teardrop coupé; the 1951 Willys Jeep; the 1937 Cord 812 Custom Beverly Sedan; the 1948 MG TC; and the 1941 Lincoln Continental coupe). The Cisitalia 202 is now part of the MoMA permanent collection. Despite the positive critical reception, the car wasn't a commercial success due to its high cost. Only 170 were produced between 1947 and 1952. Most cars were coachbuilt by Pinin Farina, Vignale, and Stabilimenti Farina.

Built following aerodynamic studies developed for racing cars, the Cisitalia is to this day one of the most accomplished examples of single shell coachwork. The hood, body, fenders, and headlights are an integral part of the continuously flowing surface. This was an innovative approach as before the Cisitalia 202, the prevailing philosophy was to treat each part of the body as a separate elements, with one box to house the passengers, another one for the motor, and headlights as appendages. The Cisitalia, in contrast, didn't feature sharp edges.

The 202 is featured in the 2011 video game L.A. Noire by Rockstar Games and Team Bondi as a secret car called the Cisitalia Coupe.

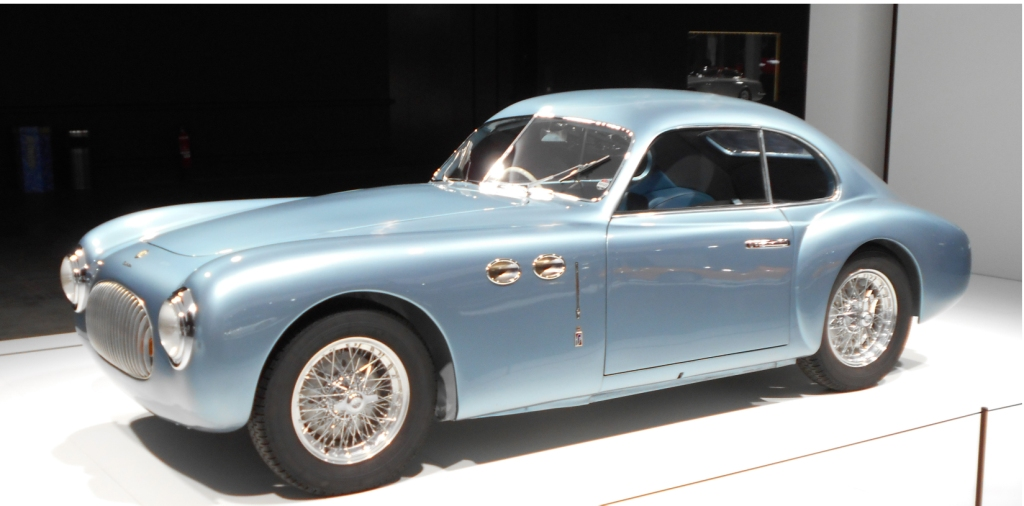
Cisitalia 202 Coupe

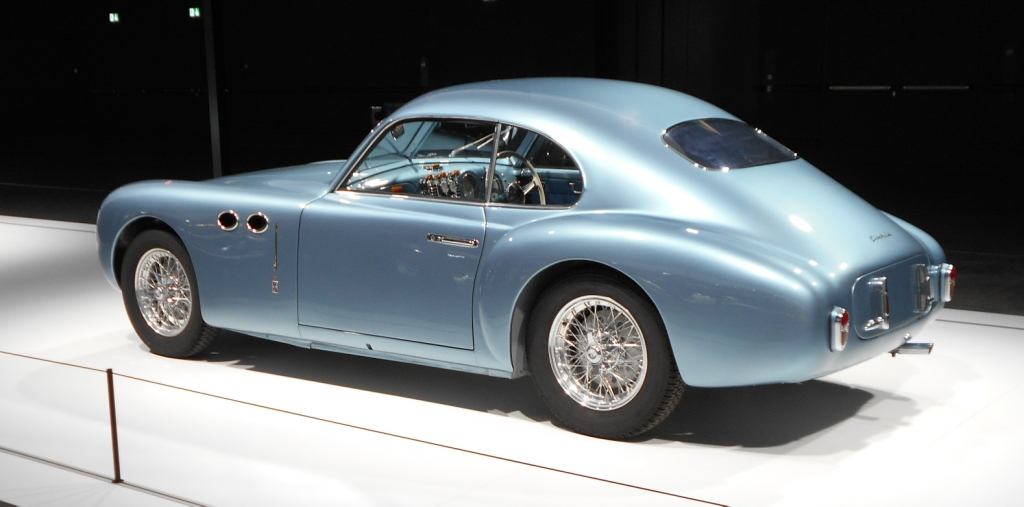
Cisitalia 202 Coupe

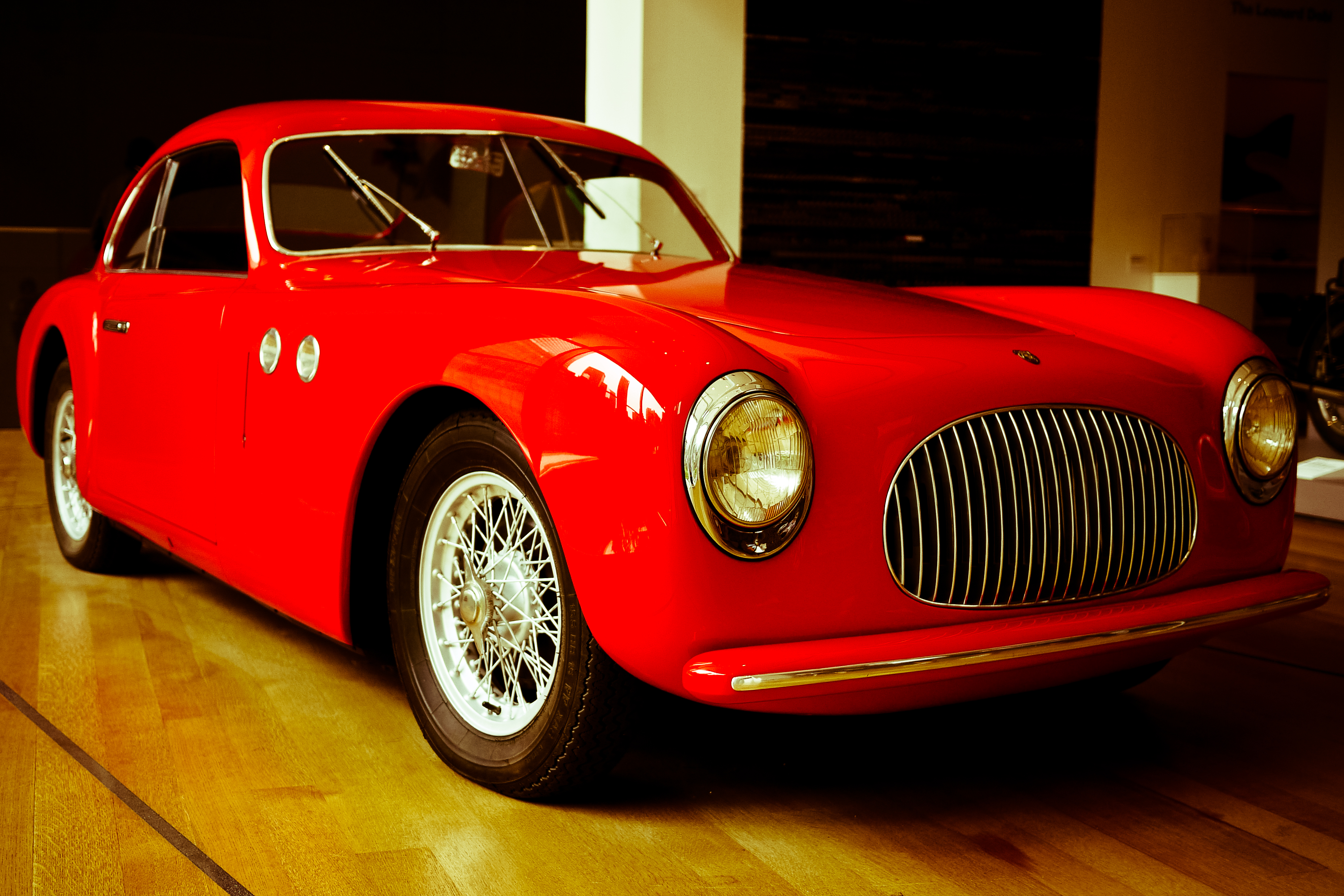
202 "berlinetta" in the MoMA, New York

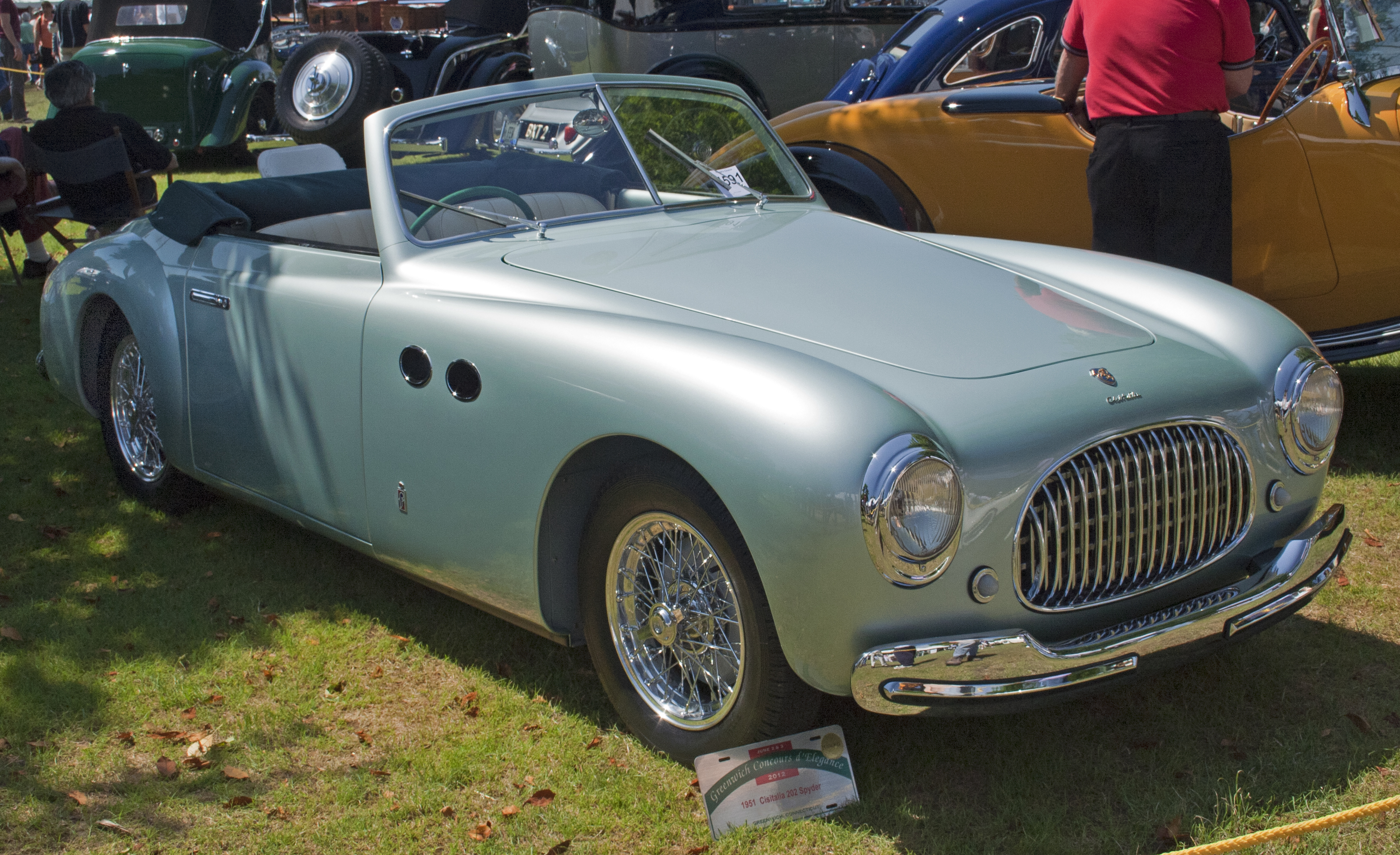
Cisitalia 202 Spider

==== 202 MM ====
Since the 202 never enjoyed large scale production (all the cars were handmade), the engineering group at Cisitalia, including Carlo Abarth, Dante Giacosa and Giovanni Savonuzzi, created several variants of the 202. Of the more important versions, the SMM Nuvolari Spider, was built and named after a class victory at the 1947 Mille Miglia by famed driver Tazio Nuvolari. It is easily identified by its large rear fins, twin windscreens and the classic Italian red paint scheme.

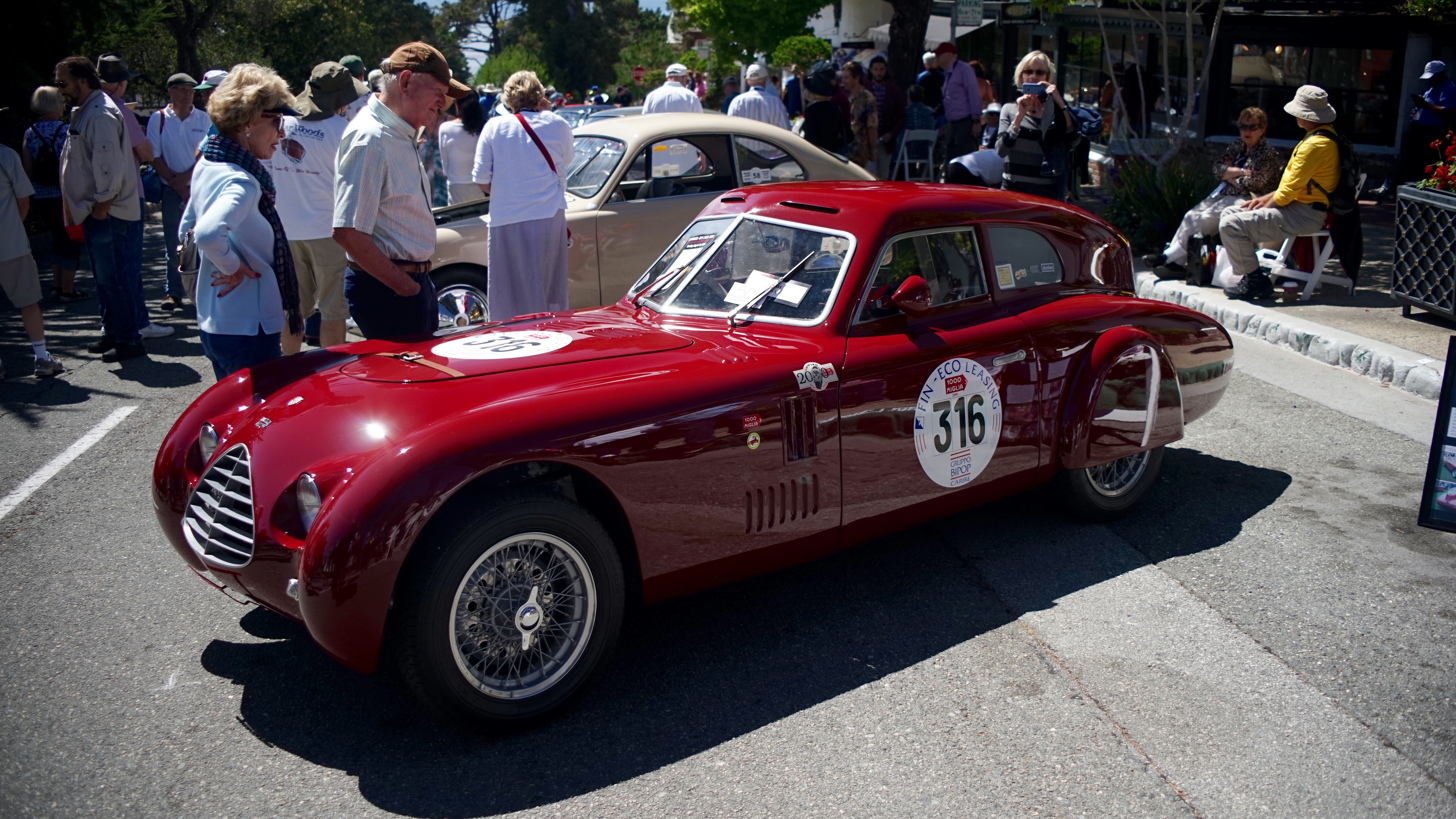
Cisitalia 202 MM "Cassone"

==== 202 SMM ====
For the upcoming 1947 season, Giovanni Savonuzzi, who had designed most of the 202, sketched a coupe for Cisitalia's competition car. The design was executed by Stabilimenti Farina upon both chassis #101 and #102. After two coupes had been finished, a spider version, called the SMM for Spider Mille Miglia, was manufactured, adorning all subsequent competition cars bearing the MM designation.

At the 1947 Mille Miglia, the Cisitalia spider driven by Nuvolari led most of the race until troubles ensued with heavy rain falling. In the end, the Cisitalia finished second overall and first in class. To acknowledge Nuvolari's efforts, all subsequent competition spiders became known as 202 SMM Nuvolaris.

Stabilimenti Farina continued production of the design for several customers. In total about 20 cars were made very similar to Nuvolari's winning car.

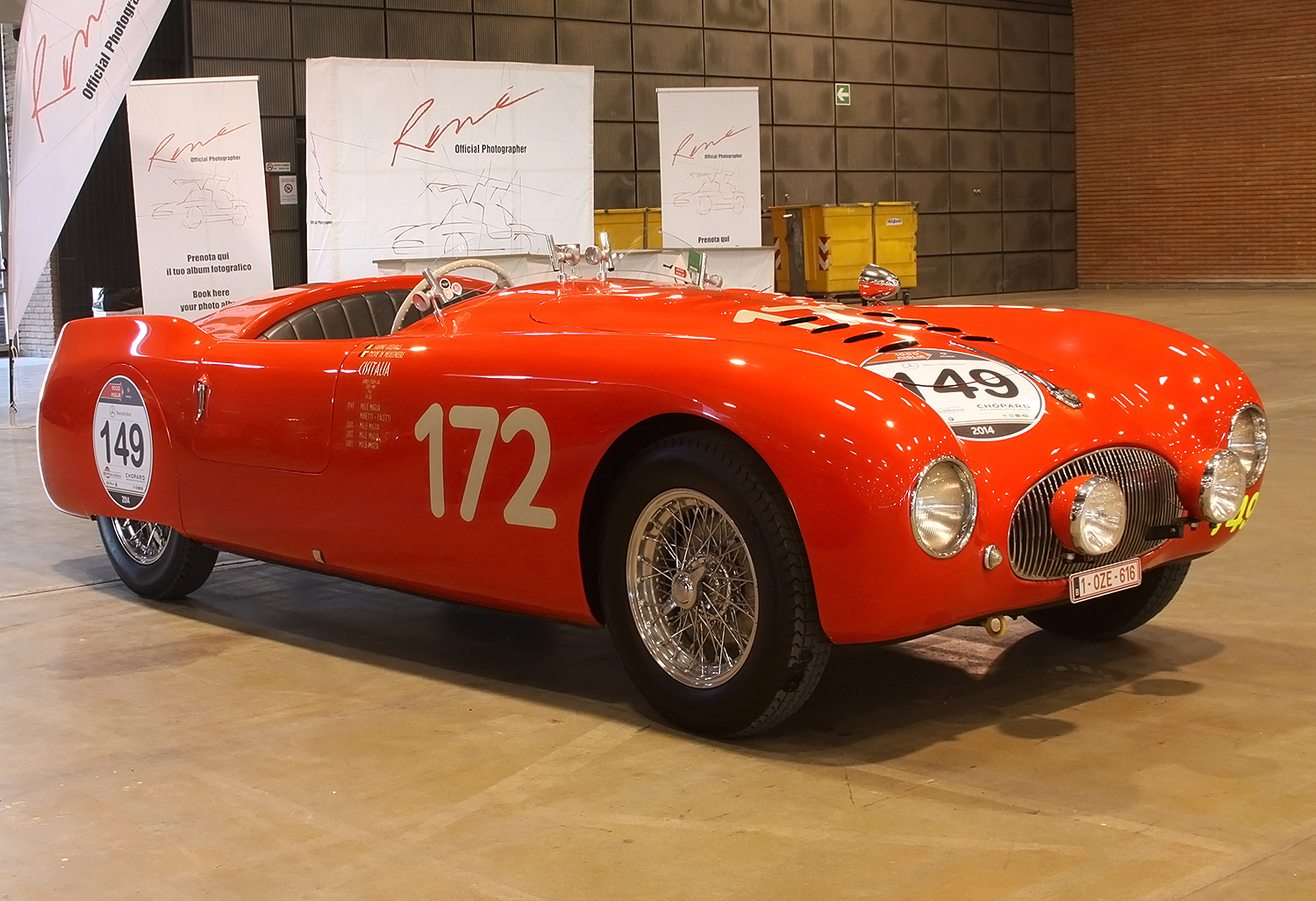
Cisitalia 202 SMM at the 2014 Mille Miglia

== Complete Formula One World Championship results ==
(key)

Year	Chassis	Engine	Tyres	Driver	1	2	3	4	5	6	7	8
1952	Cisitalia D46	BPM	?		SUI	500	BEL	FRA	GBR	GER	NED	ITA
1952	Cisitalia D46	BPM	?	(Italy) Piero Dusio								DNQ

== Full model range ==
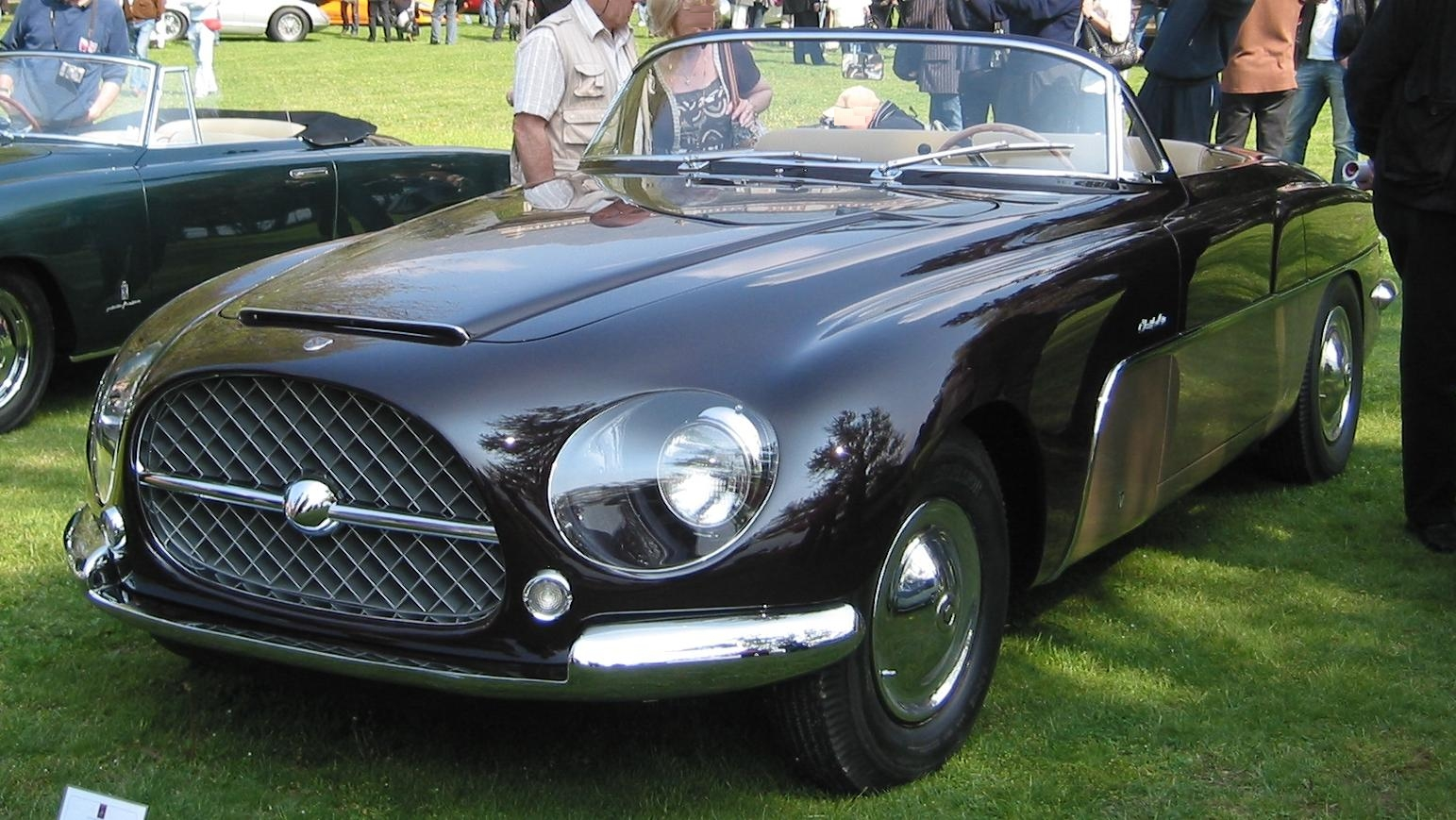
Cisitalia-Ford 808 XF Vignale

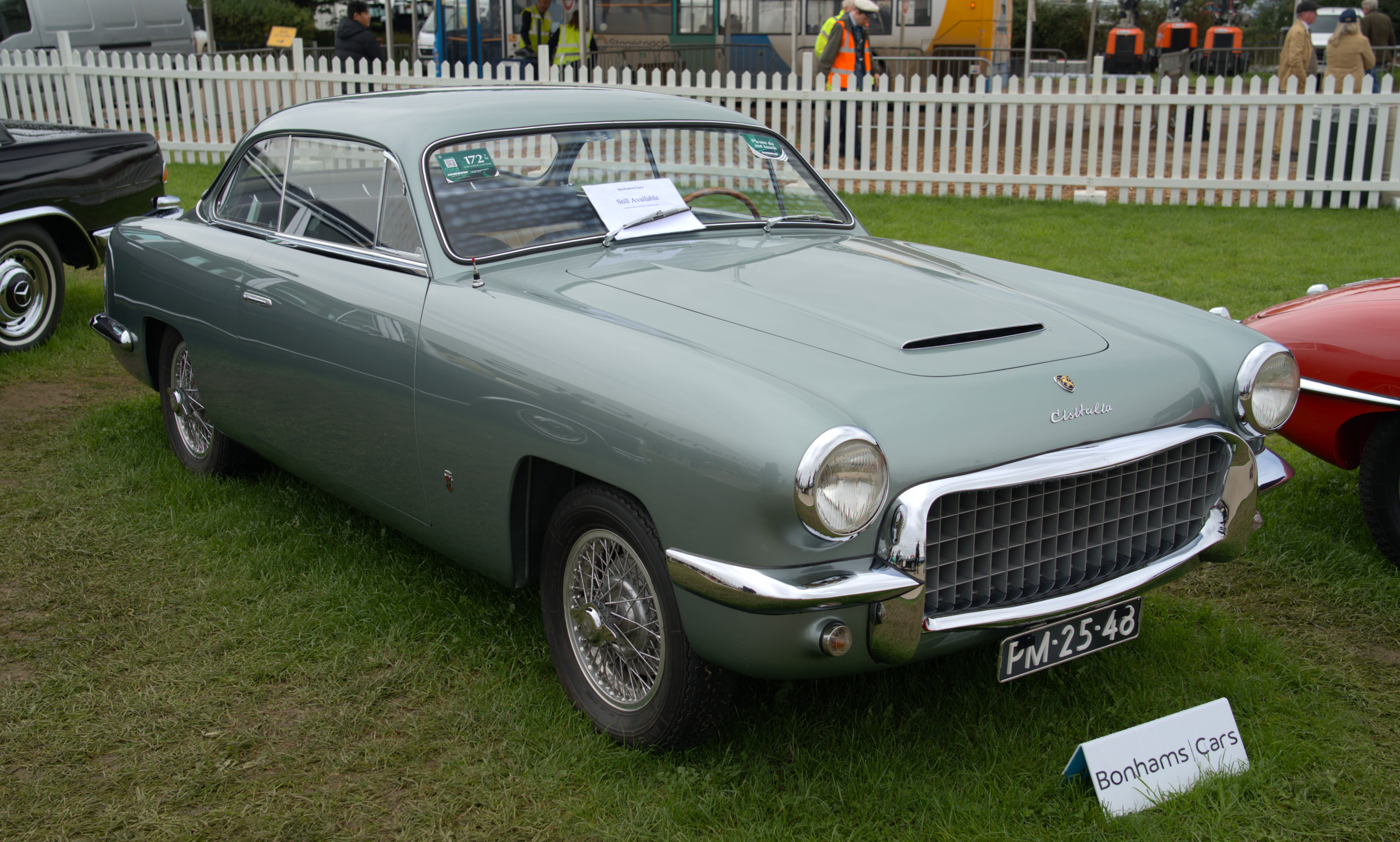
DF 505 by Ghia

- D46 Monoposto
- D47 Monoposto
- D48 Monoposto
- Grand Prix
- 202SMM Spyder Nuvolari
- 202SC
- 202C Coupé
- 202C Cabriolet
- 202 Streamliner
- 202 MM Razzo
- 202 Giacosa
- 202 Cassone
- 204 Spyder Sport
- 360 Grand Prix
- 808 XF coupé and roadster
- 202D Coupé and Spyder
- 303 DF Spyder
- 303 DF Coupé
- 33DF Voloradente
- DF85 Coupé
- 750GT
- 505 DF (by Ghia, 10 examples)
